= Zubeen Garg discography =

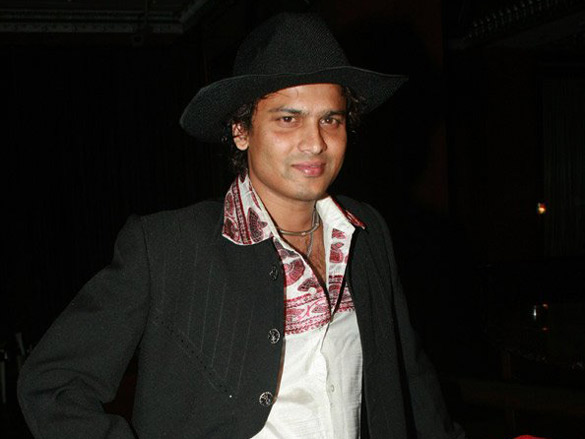
- Zubeen Garg at the audio release of Zindagi in 2007
- Studio albums: 30
- EPs: 2
- Demo albums: 1
- Soundtrack albums: 18
- Live albums: 6
- Compilation albums: 500
- Tribute albums: 4
- Singles: 700
- Music videos: 80
- Lyricist: 1600
- No. of Songs Composed: 2000 (Registered number in IPRS)
- No. of Folk Songs Recorded: 7000 (Including Bihu, Borgeet, Lokgeet, Bongeet etc)
- No. of Total Songs Recorded: 40000
- No. of Languages Recorded: 40
- No. of film songs recorded: 4000

Zubeen Garg (1972–2025) was an Indian singer-songwriter whose work was primarily in Assamese, Bengali and Hindi films and music. Over a career spanning 33 years, He sang more than 40,000 songs in an estimated 40 languages and dialects, including- Adi, Assamese, Barpetia (Goalpariya dialect), Bengali, Bhojpuri, Bishnupriya Manipuri, Bodo/Boro, Chakma, Chhattisgarhi, Deori, Dimasa, English, Goalpariya,Garo, Hindi, Kachari, Karbi, Kannada, Khamti, Khasi, Kokborok, Lalung (Tiwa), Magahi, Malayalam, Marathi, Mising (Miri), Mizo, Nepali, Nishi, Odia (Oriya), Punjabi, Rabha, Rongmei, Sadri (Nagpuri), Sambalpuri, Sanskrit, Sindhi, Tamil, Telugu, Urdu. He often recorded more than 800 songs in a single year and once recorded 36 songs in a single night.

== Assamese Songs ==
=== Assamese Film Songs ===
Years	Film	Song	Music director(s)	Lyricist(s)	Co-singer(s)	Ref.
1998	Joubone Amoni Kore	"Buku Duru Duru"	Bhupen Uzir	Hemanta Dutta	Solo	
1998	Bukur Majot Jole	"Tumiei Dilahi Mithakoi"	Jayanta Das	Charu Gohain	Mahalakshmi Iyer	
1999	Maharathi	"Xun Nelage Rup Nelage"	Manash Hazarika		Solo	
1999	Morom Nodir Gabharu Ghat	"Morom Nodir Gabhoru Ghat"	Zubeen Garg		Mahalakshmi Iyer	
1999	Morom Nodir Gabharu Ghat	"Bukure Bhakha Mor Nopowane"	Atul Medhi		Mahalakshmi Iyer	
1999	Morom Nodir Gabharu Ghat	"Ki Koru Ki Koru Nejano"	Atul Medhi		Solo	
1999	Priya O Priya	"Tumi Moromore"	Manas Robin	Diganta Bharati	Santa Uzir	
1999	Hiya Diya Niya	"Nohole Porisoy"	Zubeen Garg	Hemanta Dutta, Diganta Bharati, Jimoni Choudhury	Solo	
1999	Hiya Diya Niya	"Moloyar Dupakhit"	Zubeen Garg	Hemanta Dutta, Diganta Bharati, Jimoni Choudhury	Tarali Sarma	
1999	Hiya Diya Niya	"Kothati Bujilu"	Zubeen Garg	Hemanta Dutta, Diganta Bharati, Jimoni Choudhury	Tarali Sarma	
1999	Hiya Diya Niya	"Misate Misate"	Zubeen Garg	Hemanta Dutta, Diganta Bharati, Jimoni Choudhury	Diganta Bharati, Chetana Das, Hiranya Deka	
1999	Hiya Diya Niya	"Hiya Diya Niya (Theme)"	Zubeen Garg	Hemanta Dutta, Diganta Bharati, Jimoni Choudhury	Solo	
1999	Hiya Diya Niya	"Mitha Mitha"	Zubeen Garg	Hemanta Dutta, Diganta Bharati, Jimoni Choudhury	Debojit Chowdhury, Santa Uzir, Malobika Bora	
1999	Hiya Diya Niya	“Buku Bhora”	Zubeen Garg	Jimoni Choudhury	Malabika Bora	
1999	Tumi Mor Matho Mor	"Mayabi Ei Rati"	Zubeen Garg	Zubeen Garg	Unknown	
1999	Tumi Mor Matho Mor	"Gun Gun"	Zubeen Garg	Zubeen Garg	Luna Sonowal	
1999	Tumi Mor Matho Mor	"Puhorore Saki"	Zubeen Garg	Zubeen Garg	Luna Sonowal	
1999	Tumi Mor Matho Mor	"Ki Je Paalu Tumak"	Zubeen Garg	Diganta Bharati	Malobika Bora	
1999	Tumi Mor Matho Mor	"Etiya Hiya Mur"	Zubeen Garg	Zubeen Garg	Solo	
1999	Tumi Mor Matho Mor	"Kune Ringiyai"	Zubeen Garg	Zubeen Garg	Solo	
1999	Tumi Mor Matho Mor	"Soku Meli Saute"	Zubeen Garg	Zubeen Garg	Solo	
1999	Tumi Mor Matho Mor	"Rod Aji Keni Pau"	Zubeen Garg	Zubeen Garg	Solo	
2000	Asene Konoba Hiyaat	"Mouhona Kothare"	Manoj Sarma	Manoj Sarma	Unknown	
2000	Asene Konoba Hiyaat	"Jumi Jumi"	Manoj Sarma	Hemanta Dutta	Kalpana Patowary	
2000	Asene Konoba Hiyaat	"Soku Lutokere"	Manoj Sarma	Manoj Sarma	Kalpana Patowary	
2000	Asene Konoba Hiyaat	"Dip Lip Suwaliye"		Manoj Sarma		
2000	Bhumiputra	"Morome Bhora"	Jayanta Das	Rubul Bora	Solo	
2000	Jon Jole Kopalot	"Kua Sun Kuana"	Jayanta Das	Rubul Bora	Shaan, Babul Supriyo, Jayanta Das, Krishnamoni Nath, Anupam Saikia	
2000	Jon Jole Kopalot	"Rupahi Rongedoi"	Jayanta Das	Rubul Bora	Tarali Sarma	
2000	Morome Morom Jaane	"Tamul"	Zubeen Garg	Dr. Biren Gohain	Mili	
2000	Daag	"Mayabini Ratir Bukut"	Zubeen Garg	Zubeen Garg	Solo	
2000	Daag	"Botahe Botahe"	Zubeen Garg	Diganta Bharati		
2000	Daag	"Monole Ubhoti Ahe"	Zubeen Garg	Diganta Bharati	Diganta Bharati	
2000	Daag	"Bisarisu Kakhorote"	Zubeen Garg	Diganta Bharati	Mahalakshmi Iyer	
2000	Daag	"Daag Daag"	Zubeen Garg	Zubeen Garg	Solo	
2000	Daag	"Jeni Jaba Xun"	Zubeen Garg		Mahalaxmi Iyer	
2000	Daag	"Kino Bhaba Imankoi"	Zubeen Garg	Diganta bharati	Zubeen Garg,Utpal Sharma	
2000	Sesh Upahar	"Sesh Upahar"	Zubeen Garg		Solo	
2000	Sesh Upahar	"Hiyare Morom"	J.P. Das	Bijoy Bardoloi	Sangeeta Borthakur	
	Seuji Dharani Dhuniya	"O Gose Kobo Hudhile"	Zubeen Garg	Anandiram Das	Solo	
	Anya Ek Jatra	"Mone Mur Bisare"	Zubeen Garg	Zubeen Garg	Tarali Sarma	
	Anya Ek Jatra	"Dukhor Hagar"	Zubeen Garg	Zubeen Garg	Solo	
	Anya Ek Jatra	"Enekoi Nasa Tumi"	Rishi Raj Duarah	Unknown	Kalpana Patowary	
	Anya Ek Jatra	"Phagune Phulare Phool"	Rishi Raj Duarah	Unknown	Solo	
	Anya Ek Jatra	"Kaale Kaarhi Nile"	Rishi Raj Duarah	Unknown	Solo	
	Garam Botah	"Tenekoi Nasaba"	Jatin Sharma	Zubeen Garg	Sagarika Mukherjee	
	Garam Botah	"Phool Phule Bone Bone"	Manoj Sarma	Hemanta Dutta	Shanta Uzir	
	Garam Botah	"Mon Sohoror"	Jatin Sharma	Zubeen Garg, Garima Saikia Garg	Solo	
	Garam Botah	"Bohag Mahot Gosor Dalot"	Jatin Sharma	Manas Robin	Kumar Bhabesh, Dilip Fernandez, Shaan, Sagarika Mukherjee and many others.	
2001	Nayak	"Motoliya Botahe"	Zubeen Garg	Zubeen Garg, Hemanta Dutta, Diganta Kalita	Mahalaxmi Iyer	
2001	Nayak	"Lahe Lahe"	Zubeen Garg	Zubeen Garg, Hemanta Dutta, Diganta Kalita	Mahalaxmi Iyer	
2001	Nayak	"Monote Nu Aaji"	Zubeen Garg	Zubeen Garg, Hemanta Dutta, Diganta Kalita	Solo	
2001	Nayak	"Kinu Huriya"	Zubeen Garg	Zubeen Garg, Hemanta Dutta, Diganta Kalita	Mahalaxmi Iyer	
2001	Nayak	"Nayak Hobo"	Zubeen Garg	Zubeen Garg, Hemanta Dutta, Diganta Kalita	Solo	
2001	Nayak	"Mon Ghanot"	Zubeen Garg	Zubeen Garg, Hemanta Dutta, Diganta Kalita	Shaan, Mahalaxmi Iyer, Pamela Jain, Sagarika	
2001	Nayak	"Nayak- Theme Song"	Zubeen Garg	Zubeen Garg, Hemanta Dutta, Diganta Kalita	Solo	
2001	Zakham	"Zakham"	Bhupen Uzir		Solo	
2002	Iman Morom Kio Lage	"Nibir Morome"	Manoj Sarma		Mahalakshmi Iyer	
2002	Iman Morom Kio Lage	"Nai Buja Kionu"	Manoj Sarma		Mahalakshmi Iyer	
2002	Iman Morom Kio Lage	"Turei Sobi"	Manoj Sarma			
2002	Kanyadaan	"Ui Guthibo Jaanene"	Zubeen Garg	Manas Robin	Mahalakshmi Iyer, Shaswati Phukan	
2002	Kanyadaan	"Bandhoi Oi"	Zubeen Garg	Diganta Bharati	Solo	
2002	Kanyadaan	"Choua Choua"	Zubeen Garg	Zubeen Garg	Mitali Borkotoki	
2002	Kanyadaan	"Xun Rupere"	Zubeen Garg	Diganta Bharati	Manas Robin, Jonkey Borthakur	
2002	Kanyadaan	"Lohiale Ronga Beli"	Zubeen Garg	Manas Robin	Nirmali Das	
2002	Kanyadaan	"Neela Neela"	Zubeen Garg	Zubeen Garg	Kalpana Patowary	
2002	Jonaki Mon	"Phule Phule Aji Huoni"	Zubeen Garg	Zubeen Garg	Shaan, Sagarika Mukherjee, Arnab Bhattarcharya, Pamela Jain	
2002	Jibon Nadir Duti Par	"Kiyonu Joli Asa Mur Hun"	Zubeen Garg	Diganta Bharati	Solo	
2002	Jibon Nadir Duti Par	"Jibon Nodir Duti Paar"	Zubeen Garg	Zubeen Garg	Solo	
2002	Jibon Nadir Duti Par	"Bivaboriya"	Zubeen Garg	Diganta Bharati	Zubeen Garg, Kashmiri Saikia	
2002	Jibon Nadir Duti Par	"Ei Ghor Aamar "	Zubeen Garg		Zubeen Garg, Jonkey Barthakur	
2002	Jibon Nadir Duti Par	"Umi Umi Jolisa"	Zubeen Garg	Zubeen Garg	Zubeen Garg, Mahalakshmi Iyer	
2002	Jibon Nadir Duti Par	"Pritire jori"	Zubeen Garg	Diganta Bharati	Zubeen Garg, Papori Sharma	
2002	Jibon Nadir Duti Par	"Kokal Khamusia"	Zubeen Garg		Zubeen Garg, Mahalakshmi Iyer	
2002	Agnisakshi	"Om Prajapataye"				
2002	Agnisakshi	"Asati Pronoyor"				
2002	Agnisakshi	"Jibone Proti Khuje"	Zubeen Garg	Zubeen Garg	solo	
2002	Agnisakshi	"Karubar Sokuwe"	Zubeen Garg	Zubeen Garg		
2002	Agnisakshi	"Mahadev Keni Gol"	Zubeen Garg	Zubeen Garg, Manas Robin		
2002	Agnisakshi	"Tumi Xun Amare"	Zubeen Garg	Zubeen Garg		
2002	Agnisakshi	"Jibone Proti Pole"	Zubeen Garg	Zubeen Garg		
2002	Moromi Hobane Logori	"Atupi Dutupi Pore"	Manash Hazarika, Bhupen Uzir	Unknown	Solo	
2002	Premgeet	"Nila Nila Dusakute"	Manash Hazarika	Unknown	Sunidhi Chauhan	
2002	Koka Deutar Ghar Juwai	"Koka Deutar Ghar Juwai"	Prabhat Sharma, Manas Robin, Biju Prabha & Monti Baishya		Solo	
2002	Koka Deutar Ghar Juwai	"Mon Kio Nu Mur Abujon"	Prabhat Sharma, Manas Robin, Biju Prabha & Monti Baishya		Solo	
2002	Prem Aru Prem	"Sokuwe Sokuwe Sinaki"	Zubeen Garg	Zubeen Garg	Babita Sarma	
2002	Prem Aru Prem	"Biyopi Biyopi"	Zubeen Garg	Zubeen Garg	Jonkey Borthakur	
2002	Prem Aru Prem	"Prem Aru Prem"	Zubeen Garg			
2002	Prem Aru Prem	"Mukoli Mon"	Zubeen Garg		Arnab Chakrabarty, Shashwati Phukan & Sagarika	
2002	Prem Aru Prem	"Momor Sikati"	Zubeen Garg	Zubeen Garg		
2002	Prem Aru Prem	"Bor Moja Nohoi"	Zubeen Garg		Kashmiri Saikia Baruah	
2002	Prem Aru Prem	"Morom Edhani Morom"	Zubeen Garg	Diganta Bharati	Anindita Paul	
2002	Prem Aru Prem	"Morom Shikati Je Jole"	Zubeen Garg	Zubeen Garg		
2003	Piya Milan	"Sopunor Moromi"	Zubeen Garg	Zubeen Garg	Solo	
2003	Piya Milan	"Monore Priya Mur"	Zubeen Garg	Zubeen Garg	Saswati Phukan	
2003	Piya Milan	"Mora Soraye Pakhi Guji"	Zubeen Garg	Zubeen Garg	Kalpana Patowary	
2003	Bidhata	"Alphule Haboti"	Zubeen Garg	Zubeen Garg		
2003	Bidhata	"Atori Atori"	Zubeen Garg	Zubeen Garg	Saswati Phukan	
2003	Bidhata	"Akakhor Thikona"	Zubeen Garg	Manas Robin		
2003	Bidhata	"Ja ja Atori Ja"	Zubeen Garg	Diganta Bharati		
2003	Bidhata	"Mama O Mami O"	Zubeen Garg	Manas Robin		
2003	Bidhata	"Tetera Tetera"	Zubeen Garg	Diganta Bharati		
2003	Satyam Shivam Sundaram	"Ahise Kore Pora"	Bhupen Uzir		Solo	
2003	Satyam Shivam Sundaram	"Bone Bone"	Bhupen Uzir		Santa Uzir	
2003	Juman Suman	"Xapune Dithoke"	Zubeen Garg	Zubeen Garg	Solo	
2003	Juman Suman	"Nas Nasone"	Zubeen Garg	Zubeen Garg	Solo	
2003	Juman Suman	"Nai Eko Nai"	Zubeen Garg	Zubeen Garg	Solo	
2003	Juman Suman	"Kola Kola Hoi Andhare"	Zubeen Garg	Zubeen Garg	Solo	
2003	Juman Suman	"Tumi Janene"	Zubeen Garg	Zubeen Garg	Solo	
2004	Hridoy Kopowa Gaan	"Gun-Gun Gun-Gun Koi"	Jayanta Nath	Jeetban Baruah	Mahalakshmi Iyer	
2004	Hridoy Kopowa Gaan	Xarodhiya Phule Aaji	Jayanta Nath	Jeetban Baruah	Shashawati Phukan	
2004	Tumar Babe - Love, Passion, Obsession	(Score)	Manash Hazarika		Solo	
2004	Dinabandhu	"Kor Ejak Borokhun"	Zubeen Garg	Bhabendra Nath Saikia	Anindita Paul	
2004	Dinabandhu	"Diya Muk Diya"	Zubeen Garg	Bhabendra Nath Saikia	Anindita Paul	
2004	Kadambari	"Aaji Xanibar"	Manas Robin	Manas Robin	Solo	
2004	Rong	"Rong Tumi Huane"	Zubeen Garg	Zubeen Garg	Mahalakshmi Iyer	
2004	Rong	"Borokha Jetia Naame"	Zubeen Garg	Zubeen Garg		
2004	Rong	"Xeujiya Mon"	Zubeen Garg	Zubeen Garg		
2004	Rong	"Atiya Kakhot"	Zubeen Garg	Zubeen Garg		
2004	Rong	"Aaji Tumi Nohole"	Zubeen Garg	Zubeen Garg		
2004	Rong	"Tumi Dur Atitor"	Zubeen Garg	Zubeen Garg		
2004	Rong	"Muru Je Mone"	Zubeen Garg	Zubeen Garg		
2004	Rong	"Jun Beli Tora"	Zubeen Garg	Zubeen Garg		
2004	Rong	"Sayar Dore"	Zubeen Garg	Mrinal Kanti		
2005	Jonbai	"Jonbai Ae"	Manas Robin	Manas Robin	Bhitali Das	
2005	Jonbai	"Tumi Moi Edin Jana"	Manas Robin	Manas Robin	Subasana Dutta	
2005	Jonbai	"Boroiin Aspolin"	Manas Robin	Manas Robin	Various	
2005	Suren Suror Putek	"Ei Jaadur Nikha"	Hitesh Baruah	Hitesh Baruah	Solo	
2006	Adhinayak	"Asianki Duti Mone"	Zubeen Garg	Zubeen Garg	Navanita Sharma	
2006	Adhinayak	"Sopunar Pahe Pahe"	Zubeen Garg	Zubeen Garg	Anindita Paul	
2006	Adhinayak	"Posuwa Bolise"	Zubeen Garg	Zubeen Garg	Vitali Das	
2006	Adhinayak	"Aji Ene Ghotona"	Zubeen Garg	Diganta Bharati Zubeen Garg		
2006	Adhinayak	"Apon Buli Jakei"	Zubeen Garg	Diganta Bharati Zubeen Garg		
2006	Adhinayak	"Kinu Akhat"	Zubeen Garg	Diganta Bharati Zubeen Garg		
2006	Snehabandhan	"Rode Pore Sutalot" (Male Version)	Nanda Banerjee	Unknown	Solo	
2006	Tumar Moromere	"Moromere Matisu"	Bubul		Gayatri Iyer	
2006	Aami Axomiya	"Kar Babe"	Zubeen Garg	Zubeen Garg, Sasanka Samir	Solo	
2006	Dipali	"Du Paharor"	Biman Baruah	Biman Baruah	Vitali Das	
2007	Jonda Iman Gunda	"Xirote Hendur Loba"	Hitesh Baruah	Hitesh Baruah	Mousumi, Jinti, Zublee	
2007	Jonda Iman Gunda	"Gawore Horu Horu Paduli"	Hitesh Baruah	Hitesh Baruah	Jinti, Zublee, Neha, Gargi	
2008	Mon Jaai	''Mon Jaai"	Zubeen Garg	Diganta Bharati	Solo	
2008	Mon Jaai	"Dheere Dheere"	Zubeen Garg	Diganta Bharati	Solo	
2008	Mon Jaai	"Anurag Etiya"	Zubeen Garg	Diganta Bharati	Solo	
2008	Mon Jaai	"Hahi Heruwai"	Zubeen Garg	Diganta Bharati	Diganta Bharati	
2008	Mon Jaai	"Morom Dila Tumak"	Zubeen Garg	Zubeen Garg	Simanta Shekhar	
2008	Mon Jaai	"Bohag"	Zubeen Garg	Diganta Bharati	Solo	
2008	Mon Jaai	"Mon Jaai" (Extended Version)	Zubeen Garg	Diganta Bharati	Solo	
2009	Jibon Bator Logori	"Jibon Bator Logori"	Arup Dutta, Biman Baruah and Timothy Das Hanche	Timothy Das Hanse		
2009	Jibon Bator Logori	"Mur Mon Tulokhir Tolote"	Arup Dutta, Biman Baruah and Timothy Das Hanche	Timothy Das Hanse		
2009	Jibon Bator Logori	"Jodi Jibonor Rong"	Arup Dutta, Biman Baruah and Timothy Das Hanche	Timothy Das Hanse		
2009	Jibon Bator Logori	"Tumi Tu Nubuja"	Arup Dutta, Biman Baruah and Timothy Das Hanche	Timothy Das Hanse		
2009	Abhimani Mon (film)	"Naw Loi Aanim Goi"	Diganta Bharati	Dhruba Rajkhowa		
2009	Abhimani Mon (film)	"Dhin Dhin"	Diganta Bharati	Diganta Bharati		
2009	Abhimani Mon (film)	"Kolia Meghe"	Rekibul, Babu, Chandan	Diganta Bharati		
2009	Abhimani Mon (film)	"Lahe Doi"	Rekibul	Diganta Bharati		
2009	Abhimani Mon (film)	"Masare Bhale Paw"	Manas Robin	Manas Robin		
2009	Abhimani Mon (film)	"Pogola Pogola"	Babu, Rekibul	Diganta Bharati		
2009	Abhimani Mon (film)	"Sokulore Mala"	Diganta Bharati	Diganta Bharati		
2009	Abhimani Mon (film)	"Sui Sabo de"	Diganta Bharati	Diganta Bharati		
2009	Babul	"Babul"	Palash Surjya Gogoi	Palash Surjya Gogoi		https://instagram.com/p/Dd3CYsAMaA8/
2011	Raamdhenu	"Tupi Tupi"	Jatin Sharma	Ibson Lal Baruah	Sunidhi Chauhan	
2011	Raamdhenu	"Rang Diya Morom"	Jatin Sharma	Diganta Bharati	Shreya Ghoshal	
2011	Jetuka Pator Dore	"Puwar Hahit"	Palash Surya Gogoi	Diganta Bharati	Solo	
2011	Jetuka Pator Dore	"Puwar Hahit (Duet)"	Palash Surya Gogoi	Diganta Bharati	Santa Uzir	
2011	Jetuka Pator Dore	"Pokhila Porise"	Palash Surya Gogoi	Palash Surya Gogoi	Solo	
2011	Pole Pole Ure Mon	"Poita Bhaat"	Biman Baruah, Arup Dutta	Timothy Das Hanse	Solo	
2011	Pole Pole Ure Mon	"Proti Poley"	Biman Baruah, Arup Dutta	Biman Baruah	Subasana Dutta	
2012	Me And My Sister	"Thunuk Thanak"	Bapi	Diganta Bharati	Solo	
2012	Richang	"Deha Dhunia"				https://www.jiosaavn.com/album/rishang/4CcLwzYTfPU_
2012	Richang	"Joor Ejak"				https://www.jiosaavn.com/album/rishang/4CcLwzYTfPU_
2013	Tumi Jodi Kuwa	"Mon Akakhi"	Chandan Bezbarua		Nabanita	
2013	Shinyor	"Kaalor Aasur"	Anurag Saikia		Bornalee	
2014	Rodor Sithi	"Rodor Sithi"	Zubeen Garg	Sasanka Samir	Solo	
2014	Rodor Sithi	"Akakhe Diya"	Zubeen Garg	Sasanka Samir	Solo	
2014	Rodor Sithi	"Endhare"	Zubeen Garg	Hiren Bhattacharyya	Solo	
2014	Rodor Sithi	"Protidine"	Zubeen Garg	Diganta Bharati	Solo	
2014	The Face	"The Face Theme"				
2015	Ahetuk	"Ahetuk"	Poran Barkatoky	Ibson lal Baruah	Solo	
2015	Ahetuk	"Ahetuk" (Dub Mix)	Poran Barkatoky	Ibson lal Baruah	Solo	
2015	Ahetuk	"Lahe Lahe"	Poran Barkatoky	Bani das	Solo	
2015	Anuradha	"Esherenga Puhor"	Geet Priyam	Geet Priyam	Solo	
2016	Paglee	"Tumar Hiyat"	Arup Dutta, Anupam Saikia		Subasana Dutta	
2016	Paglee	"Lajuki Lajuki Khujote"	Arup Dutta, Anupam Saikia		Priyanka Bharali	
2016	Gaane Ki Aane	"Janu Janu"	Zubeen Garg		Parineeta Borthakur	
2016	Gaane Ki Aane	"Gaanore Potharote"	Zubeen Garg	Sasanka Samir		
2016	Gaane Ki Aane	"Dancing Tonight"	Zubeen Garg		Anindita Paul	
2016	Gaane Ki Aane	"Gaane Ki Aane"	Zubeen Garg	Hiren Bhattacharya	Parineeta Borthakur	
2016	Gaane Ki Aane	"Xaliki Puwar"	Zubeen Garg	Zubeen Garg	Mahalaxmi Iyer	
2016	Gaane Ki Aane	"Tumi rodali"	Zubeen Garg	Zubeen Garg	Zubeen Garg	
2016	Gaane Ki Aane	"Aaho Nahu"	Zubeen Garg	Zubeen Garg	Madhusmita Borthakur	
2016	Tumi a love story	"Jodi Tumi Aha"				
2017	Dur	"Xekh Hoi Kio"	Siddharth Hazarika and Rahul Dev Nath		Barnalee Deuri	
2017	Mission China	"Mission China"	Zubeen Garg	Zubeen Garg	Siddharth Hazarika, Rohit Sonar, Amit Paul	
2017	Mission China	"Din Jwole Raati Jwole"	Zubeen Garg	Zubeen Garg	Zublee Baruah	
2017	Mission China	"Every Morning Comes"	Zubeen Garg	Zubeen Garg	Joi Barua	
2017	Mission China	"Mero Mayalaai"	Zubeen Garg	Sasanka Samir	Satabdi Borah	
2017	Mission China	"Naino Se Nikalte (Reprise)"	Zubeen Garg	Sumit Acharya	Turi	
2017	Konwarpurar Konwar	"Kobita Kenekoi Likhe"	Partha Pratim	Ibson Lal Baruah	Subasana Dutta	
2017	Priyar Priyo	"Priyar Priyo"	Zubeen Garg	Diganta Bharati	Neel Akash, Kumar Bhabesh	
2017	Priyar Priyo	"O Priya"	Zubeen Garg	Zubeen Garg	Siddharth Hazarika, Bornali Kalita, Ritrisha Sarma	
2017	Priyar Priyo	"Akuli Bikuli"	Zubeen Garg	Zubeen Garg	Nahid Afrin	
2017	Priyar Priyo	"Priyar Bosono"	Zubeen Garg	Sasanka Samir	Mayurpankhi	
2018	Hosa Prem	"Hosa Prem-Disco song"	Babli Haque	Rekibul Hassan	Ananya Mukharjee	
2018	Dham Dhama Dham	"Dubu Dubu Koi"	Rideep Das	Sunit Gogoi		https://www.youtube.com/watch?v=i_vor2M0RvM
2018	Epaar Xipaar	"Xoto Jonomor"			Lata Bordoloi"	5.29 Minutes https://www.jiosaavn.com/song/xoto-jonomor/LwkvQxgFXwI
2018	Raktabeez	"Dhire Dhire"	Palash Surya Gogoi	Palash Surya Gogoi	Deeplina Deka	
2018	The Underworld	"The Underworld"	Zubeen Garg	Rahul Gautam Sharma	Rahul Gautam Sharma	
2018	The Underworld	"Ulahe Abore"	Zubeen Garg	Rahul Gautam Sharma	Goldie Sohel, Kaveri Singh, Parineeta Borthakur	
2018	The Underworld	"Jatonare"	Zubeen Garg	Sasanka Samir	Ananya Dutt	
2018	The Underworld	"Superman"	Zubeen Garg	Sasanka Samir	Solo	
2018	The Underworld	"Thora Sa Theher Ja"	Zubeen Garg	Goldie Sohel	Parineeta Borthakur	
2018	The Underworld	"Tupa Tupe"	Zubeen Garg	Mausam Gogoi	Mausam Gogoi, Satabdi Borah	
2018	Nijanor Gaan	"Nijanor Gaan"	Jatin Sharma	Sasanka Samir	Solo	
2018	Nijanor Gaan	Neelate Luka Bhaku	Jatin Sharma	Rajdweep	Rupjyoti	
2019	Kokaideu Bindaas	"Moina Bakhor"	Manas Robin		Solo	
2019	Ratnakar	"Ratnakar"	Zubeen Garg	Sasanka Samir	Joshua Queah, Synicah	
2019	Ratnakar	"Eta Kotha"	Zubeen Garg	Sasanka Samir	Harchita Bhattacharya	
2019	Ratnakar	"Bhal Puware"	Zubeen Garg	Rahul Gautam Sharma	Satabdi Borah	
2019	Ratnakar	"Koli meliley"	Zubeen Garg	Rahul Gautam Sharma	Navanita Sharma Bora	
2019	Ratnakar	"Rati Rati"	Zubeen Garg	Zubeen Garg	Gayatri Hazarika	
2019	Kanchanjangha	"Kanchanjangha"	Zubeen Garg	Jyoti Prasad Agarawala	Rahul Gautam, Aum S. Varenyam	
2019	Kanchanjangha	"Dhulikona"	Zubeen Garg	Sasanka Samir	Zublee Baruah, Panchana Rabha	
2019	Kanchanjangha	"Priti bhora"	Zubeen Garg	Sasanka Samir	Gayatri Hazarika	
2019	Kanchanjangha	"Priti bhora 2"	Zubeen Garg	Sasanka Samir	Mansi	
2019	Kanchanjangha	"Panchana"	Zubeen Garg	Sasanka Samir & tradational	Panchana Rabha	
2019	Kanchanjangha	"Rikto Xikto"	Zubeen Garg	Punam Nath	Rahul Gautam Sharma, Gauranga	
2019	Pratighaat	"Pratighaat"	Zubeen Garg	Sasanka Samir	Solo	
2019	Janaknandini	"Duru Duru"	Nanda Banerjee	Apurba Jyoti Bhuyan	Zublee	
2019	Bandhu	"Bandhu"	Partha	Ibson Lal Baruah	Solo	
2020	Raajneeti	"Inquilab"	Jayanta Kakati	Rahul Gautam Sharma, Miniminimi	Minmi	
2021	Chandrawali	"Aserenga Senehi (Title Track)"	Ajoy Phukan	Ajoy Phukan	Prakriti Sarma	
2021	Chandrawali	"Xopun Xopun"	Ajoy Phukan		Subasana Dutta	
2021	Lankakanda	"Vande"	Rahul Gautam Sharma	Rahul Gautam Sharma	Solo	
2021	Lankakanda	"Regez Gez"	Mrinal Baishnab	Mrinal Baishnab	Solo	
2022	Dada Tumi Dusta Bor	"Kuwana"	Alaap Dudul Saikia	Rahul Gautam Sharma	Gayatri Hazarika	
2022	Dr. Bezbaruah 2	"Jiliki Jilika"	Zubeen Garg	Brojen Barua	Synicha	
2022	Dr. Bezbaruah 2	"Ki Naam Di Maatim"	Zubeen Garg	Diganta Bharati	Bhaswati Bharati	
2022	Dr. Bezbaruah 2	"Phool Phool"	Zubeen Garg	Eli Ahmed	Zublee Baruah	
2022	Dr. Bezbaruah 2	"Moina Kun Bidhatai"	Zubeen Garg	Brojen Barua	Indrani Talukdar	
2022	Dr. Bezbaruah 2	"Dr. Bezbaruah (Title Track)"	Zubeen Garg	Rahul Gautam Sharma	Zublee Baruah	
2023	Joddha	"Ei Mayabi Raati"	Zubeen Garg	Rahul Gautam Sharma	Synicha	
2023	Sri Raghupati	"Tumi Aru Moi"	Pranoy Dutta	Diganta Bharati	Deeplina Deka	
2023	Raghav	"Maa"	Zubeen Garg	Diganta Bharati	Shanta Uzir	
2023	Raghav	"Silmil Tupanite"	Zubeen Garg	Zubeen Garg	Zubeen Garg, Mahalakshmi Iyer	
2023	Slam Book	"Jibone Ki Dile"	Zubeen Garg	Zubeen Garg		
2023	Slam Book	"Paltora"	Zubeen Garg	Sasanka Samir		
2023	Slam Book	"Anumoti Dilu"	Zubeen Garg	Diganta bharati		
2023	Slam Book	"Kinu Hepahe"	Zubeen Garg			
2024	Wide Angle	"Joi Aai Axom"		Jetabon Baruah		https://www.youtube.com/watch?v=EV1kSlOdswo
2024	Wide Angle	"Purbobharoti"		Mrigen Borkotoky		https://www.youtube.com/watch?v=b0DEPlnPCE8
2024	Sikaar	"Xaturongi "	Zubeen Garg	Sasanka Samir	Zubeen Garg & Parishmita Phukan	
2024	Sikaar	"Ekadoshi Ratiya"	Zubeen Garg		Zubeen Garg, Achurjya Borpatra	
2024	Sikaar	"Kia Bukute"	Zubeen Garg			
2024	Sikaar	"London Dreams"	Zubeen Garg		Apache Indian, Usha Uthup	
2024	Sikaar	"Sikaar"	Zubeen Garg		Zubeen Garg, Gitanjali Das	
2025	Bhaimon Da	"Era Eri"	Zubeen Garg	Diganta Bharati	Mahalakshmi Iyer	
2025	Homework	"Jantra"	Zubeen Garg	Zubeen Garg	—N/a	
2025	Roi Roi Binale	"Roi Roi Binale" (Title Track)	Zubeen Garg	Zubeen Garg	—N/a	
2025	Roi Roi Binale	"Mur Mon"	Zubeen Garg	Zubeen Garg	Sweety Das	
2025	Roi Roi Binale	"Xopun Xopun"	Zubeen Garg	Zubeen Garg	Moromi Sharma	
2025	Roi Roi Binale	"Mon Gole Mur Kakhole"	Zubeen Garg	Zubeen Garg		
2025	Roi Roi Binale	"Jun Jwoli"	Zubeen Garg	Zubeen Garg	—N/a	
2025	Roi Roi Binale	"Sokulure Roi Roi Binale"	Zubeen Garg	Zubeen Garg	Achurjya Borpatra	
2025	Roi Roi Binale	"Belipua"	Zubeen Garg	Zubeen Garg	Papon	
2025	Roi Roi Binale	"Tumar Nilim Kothar Dore"	Zubeen Garg	Zubeen Garg	—N/a	
2025	Roi Roi Binale	"Dusokur Kajolere"	Zubeen Garg, Dipkesh Borgohain	Zubeen Garg	Sabita Sharma Goswami, Arundhati Bhanu Priya	
2025	Roi Roi Binale	"Free bird"	Zubeen Garg	Sasanka Samir	Papon Joi Barua	
2026	Adishakti	"Ani Bani"	Zublee Baruah	Dr. Parthasarathi Mahanta	Zublee Baruah	https://www.youtube.com/watch?v=memRe2ci1C8
2026	Bihu Attack (Dubbed)	"Ronga Boga Gaal"	Biswajit Bhattacherjee	A M Rahman	Farheena Nasrin	https://www.youtube.com/watch?v=FA5uRoYEadk
2026	Mahabahu - The Brahmaputra	"Xaturongi"	Savvi Sabarwal	Sameer	Deeplina Deka	https://www.youtube.com/watch?v=-BD853z2WNU
2026	Dipholu	"Xorogi Xopon"	Jekiv	Nekib	Gayatri Hazarika	https://www.youtube.com/watch?v=u_ODTvRLjhQ
2026	Dipholu	"Prem Baru"	Jekiv	Gargee	Rupali kashyap	https://www.youtube.com/watch?v=iDQXaIYqbmw
2026	NRC (Nalparar Ram Chandra)	"Eghoriya Mon"	Arnab Bashista	Paplu Chetia	Priyakshi Pachani	https://www.youtube.com/watch?v=bnVhXbR7QuA
2026	Kokadeuta Nati Aru Hati 2	"Runjun"	Zubeen Garg	Kailash Nath Sharma		https://www.youtube.com/watch?v=ss0TWoDxp7s
TBA	Dhwaja					
TBA	Barood 2					
Unreleased	You're Not My Julie	"You're Not My Julie"	Zubeen Garg			https://www.youtube.com/shorts/vi-1Cfx7Hsg

=== Assamese Short Film ===
Year	Film	Song	Director	Music Director(s)	Lyricist(s)	Co-Singer(s)	Ref.
2009	Babul	Babul Title Song		Palash Surjya Gogoi	Polax Surjya Gogoi	Solo	https://gaana.com/album/babul-title-song
2015	42.8%						42.8% refers to the standard alcohol-by-volume percentage (v/v) found in many popular whiskey brands in India. https://www.youtube.com/watch?v=XQyljwm_l2A
2023	Kasioli Beli	Kasioli Beli		Palash Surjya Gogoi	Diganta Bharati	Solo	https://www.youtube.com/watch?v=D2NUVcU_vtQ
2023	Drug Menace		Kamal Lochan				https://www.youtube.com/watch?v=klBQBoHlyCM

=== Assamese Album songs ===
==== Modern Song ====
Year	Album	Song	Composer(s)	Writer(s)	Co-singer(s)	Ref.
1992	Anamika	"Hahile Tumi (Anamika)"	Zubeen Garg	Zubeen Garg	Solo	
1992	Anamika	"Hiya Dohe"	Zubeen Garg	Zubeen Garg	Solo	
1992	Anamika	"Pritir Hkhubakhe"	Zubeen Garg	Renu Sharma	Solo	
1992	Anamika	"Monor Nijanot"	Zubeen Garg	Zubeen Garg	Solo	
1992	Anamika	"Kio Janu Aaji"	Zubeen Garg	Zubeen Garg	Kavita Krishnamurti	
1992	Anamika	"Gaane Ki Aane"	Zubeen Garg	Hiren Bhattacharyya	Solo	
1992	Anamika	"Huna Huna"	Zubeen Garg	Zubeen Garg	Kavita Krishnamurti	
1992	Anamika	"Pothe Pothe"	Zubeen Garg	Sabita Sharma	Kavita Krishnamurthy	
1992	Sopunor Sur	"Nibir Junaki Rati"	Zubeen Garg		Solo	
1992	Sopunor Sur	"Mousumi"	Zubeen Garg	Gautom Hazarika	Solo	
1992	Sopunor Sur	"Sopunore Pokhi"	Zubeen Garg		Sabita Sharma	
1992	Sopunor Sur	"Aajir Pora"	Zubeen Garg, Nripen Sharma	Nripen Sharma	Koustav Shama	
1992	Sopunor Sur	"Bihure Boliya Mon"	Zubeen Garg	Zubeen Garg	Swaswati Phukan	
1992	Sopunor Sur	"Imaan Moromore Jonaki"	Koustav Shama	Zubeen Garg	Koustav Shama	
1992	Sopunor Sur	"Jetiya Torali Phule"	Zubeen Garg, Diganta Sarma	Zubeen Garg	Koustav Shama	
1992	Sopunor Sur	" Etiya Padulite Ase Roi Konoba"	Zubeen Garg	Zubeen Garg	Sabita Sarma and Zubeen Garg	
1992	Anuradha	"Mon Boi Jai "	Zubeen Garg	Zubeen Garg	Anuradha Paudwal	
1992	Anuradha	"Jun Gola"	Zubeen Garg	Zubeen Garg	Utpal Sharma & Anuradha Paudwal	
1992	Anuradha	"Jonome Jonome"	Zubeen Garg	Zubeen Garg	Utpal Sharma & Anuradha Paudwal	
1992	Anuradha	"kune Jane"	Zubeen Garg	Zubeen Garg	Utpal Sharma	
1992	Anuradha	"Tumi Diya Morome"	Zubeen Garg	Zubeen Garg	Utpal Sharma & Anuradha Paudwal	
1993	Mur Xuria Geet	"Alakananda" "Achina Dekhote"	Zubeen Garg	Zubeen Garg	Solo	
1993	Mur Xuria Geet	"Xomoyo Jen"	Zubeen Garg	Zubeen Garg		
1993	Mur Xuria Geet	"Jajabor Hoi"	Zubeen Garg	Amar Jyoti Choudhary		
1993	Mur Xuria Geet	"Tumi Xuriya"	Zubeen Garg	Zubeen Garg		
1993	Mur Xuria Geet	"Nilm Akash"	Zubeen Garg	Amar Jyoti Choudhary		
1993	Ritu	"Duroni Duroni"	Zubeen Garg	Zubeen Garg	Solo	
1993	Ritu	"Tumi Jonaki Xubakh"	Zubeen Garg	Zubeen Garg	Solo	
1993	Ritu	"Tumi Janu Pariba Xun"	Zubeen Garg	Zubeen Garg	Leena Bezbora	
1993	Ritu	"Mone Mur Kiyo Aji"	Zubeen Garg	Zubeen Garg	Leena Bezbora	
1993	Ritu	"Duru duru kopise "	Zubeen Garg	Utpal	Riba Das	
1993	Junaki Mon	"Junaki Mon"	Zubeen Garg	Zubeen Garg	Solo	
1993	Junaki Mon	"Sokulore Bhora"	Zubeen Garg	Zubeen Garg	solo	
1993	Junaki Mon	"Nisatiye Kinu"	Zubeen Garg	Zubeen Garg	solo	
1994	Maya	"Maya"	Zubeen Garg	Zubeen Garg	Solo	
1994	Maya	"Niribili Godhuli"	Zubeen Garg	Zubeen Garg	Kavita Krishnamurti	
1994	Maya	"Jonake"	Zubeen Garg	Zubeen Garg	Solo	
1994	Maya	"Dure Dure"	Zubeen Garg	Zubeen Garg,	Solo	
1994	Maya	"Ujagori"	Zubeen Garg	Zubeen Garg,	Kavita Krishnamurti	
1994	Maya	"Jonak Gola"	Zubeen Garg	Kapil Thakur,	Solo	
1994	Maya	"Unmmona"	Zubeen Garg	Zubeen Garg,	Solo	
1994	Maya	"Phulere Xojalu"	Zubeen Garg	Hiren Bhattacharya	Kavita Krishnamurti	
1995	Asha	"Asha"	Zubeen Garg	Zubeen Garg	Solo	
1995	Asha	"Tumi Jodi Kuwa"	Zubeen Garg	Zubeen Garg	Sabita Sharma	
1995	Asha	"Jolila Purila"	Zubeen Garg	Zubeen Garg	Solo	
1995	Asha	"Aami Jen"	Zubeen Garg	Zubeen Garg	Sabita Sharma	
1995	Asha	"Tumi Janane"	Zubeen Garg	Zubeen Garg	Solo	
1995	Asha	"Mor Mon"	Zubeen Garg	Zubeen Garg	Sabita Sharma	
1995	Asha	"Abhimani Mon"	Zubeen Garg	Zubeen Garg	Solo	
1995	Zubeenor Gaan	"Endhar Hobo Nuwaru"	Zubeen Garg	Zubeen Garg	Solo	
1995	Zubeenor Gaan	"Aetia Aase Mathu"	Zubeen Garg	Zubeen Garg	Solo	
1995	Zubeenor Gaan	"Laahe Laahe Osinaki"	Zubeen Garg	Zubeen Garg	Solo	
1995	Zubeenor Gaan	"Etiau Hkhaare Aasu"	Zubeen Garg	Zubeen Garg	Solo	
1995	Zubeenor Gaan	"Tumi Nidiya"	Zubeen Garg	Zubeen Garg	Solo	
1995	Zubeenor Gaan	"Umi Umi Jwole"	Zubeen Garg	Zubeen Garg	Mahalakshmi Iyer, Hema Sardesai	
1995	Zubeenor Gaan	"Ujagori Nikhaar"	Zubeen Garg	Bijay Duwarah	Mahalakshmi Iyer	
1995	Zubeenor Gaan	"Aakilu Sobikhon"	Zubeen Garg	Zubeen Garg	Solo	
1996	Rong	"Rong Tumi"	Zubeen Garg	Zubeen Garg	Mahalakshmi Iyer	
1996	Rong	"Aaji Tumi Nohole"	Zubeen Garg	Zubeen Garg	Mahalakshmi Iyer	
1996	Rong	"Atiya Kakhot"	Zubeen Garg	Zubeen Garg	Solo	
1996	Rong	"Tumi Dur"	Zubeen Garg	Zubeen Garg	Solo	
1996	Rong	"Joon Beli Xokolu"	Zubeen Garg	Zubeen Garg	Solo	
1996	Rong	"Borokha Jetiya Naame"	Zubeen Garg	Zubeen Garg	Solo	
1996	Rong	"Muru Je"	Zubeen Garg	Zubeen Garg	Solo	
1996	Rong	"Xeujiya Mon"	Zubeen Garg	Zubeen Garg	Solo	
1996	Jan Moni	"Jaanmoni O Posuwa"	Biman Baruah	Zubeen Garg	Santa Uzir	
1997	Mukti	"Mukti"	Zubeen Garg	Zubeen Garg	Solo	
1997	Mukti	"Phool Phulok"	Zubeen Garg	Dwijendra Mohan Sharma	Solo	
1997	Mukti	"Sokuwe Sokuwe"	Zubeen Garg	Zubeen Garg	Jonkey Borthakur	
1997	Mukti	"Hkhunere Hkhojuwa"	Zubeen Garg	Zubeen Garg	Solo	
1997	Mukti	"Meghor Boron"	Zubeen Garg	Zubeen Garg	Solo	
1997	Mukti	"Obaak Obaak"	Zubeen Garg	Zubeen Garg	Solo	
1997	Mukti	"Pratitu Prahar"	Zubeen Garg	Zubeen Garg	Solo	
1997	Mukti	"Ujalai Rakhisu"	Zubeen Garg	Zubeen Garg	Jonkey Borthakur	
1998	Snigdha Junak	"Nasaba Sokule"	Zubeen Garg	Zubeen Garg	Papon	
1998	Snigdha Junak	"Jolila Jetiya "	Zubeen Garg	Zubeen Garg	Solo	
1998	Snigdha Junak	"Mur Eyatu Rati"	Diganta Bharati, Zubeen Garg	Diganta Bharati	Solo	
1998	Pansoi	"Door Duronire Mon Junaki Mon"	Zubeen Garg	Zubeen Garg	Sagarika Mukherjee	
1998	Pansoi	"Nikhatiye Kinu Koi"	Zubeen Garg	Zubeen Garg	Solo	
1998	Xabda	"Xobdo"	Zubeen Garg	Zubben Garg	Solo	
1998	Xabda	"Roi Roi Binaale"	Zubeen Garg	Zubeen Garg	Solo	
1998	Xabda	"Atiya Jonake"	Zubeen Garg	Zubeen Garg	Mahalakshmi Iyer	
1998	Xabda	"Nokoba Nokoba"	Zubeen Garg	Zubeen Garg	Solo	
1998	Xabda	"Jogot Puhor Kori"	Zubeen Garg	Zubeen Garg	Solo	
1998	Xabda	"Kokaal Khamusiya"	Zubeen Garg	Zubeen Garg	Mahalakshmi Iyer	
1998	Xabda	"Kunubai Ringiyai"	Zubeen Garg	Zubeen Garg	Solo	
1998	Xabda	"Mon Herua"	Zubeen Garg	Zubeen Garg	Solo	
1999	Hunaru '99	"Aparajita"	Jayanta Patra	Jayanta Patra	Julika	
1999	Meghor Boron	"Jodihe Jun Tora" (Version 1)	Zubeen Garg	Zubeen Garg	Mahalakshmi Iyer	
1999	Meghor Boron	"Jodihe Jun Tora" (Version 2)	Zubeen Garg	Zubeen Garg	Sagarika	
1999	Meghor Boron	"Tumi Suwa Jetiya"	Zubeen Garg	Zubeen Garg	Solo	
1999	Meghor Boron	"Joluwa Hiya Mur"	Zubeen Garg	Zubeen Garg	Solo	
1999	Meghor Boron	"Jwoli Utha"	Zubeen Garg	Zubeen Garg	Solo	
1999	Meghor Boron	"Agoli Kolapat"	Zubeen Garg	Zubeen Garg	Mahalakshmi Iyer	
1999	Dilruba	"Hiya Diya Lowa"	Zubeen Garg	Zubeen Garg	Zubeen Garg	Solo
1999	Dilruba	"Sowa Jumi Sowa"	Zubeen Garg	Zubeen Garg	Zubeen Garg	Solo
1999	Dilruba	"Aaina Bhongadi"	Zubeen Garg	Zubeen Garg	Zubeen Garg	Solo
1999	Dilruba	"Bedardi Duniya"	Zubeen Garg	Zubeen Garg	Zubeen Garg	Solo
1999	Dilruba	"Dillagi Koru Edhani"	Zubeen Garg	Zubeen Garg	Zubeen Garg	Solo
1999	Dilruba	"Karbala"	Zubeen Garg	Zubeen Garg	Zubeen Garg	Solo
1999	Dilruba	"Tumi Mur Dilore"	Zubeen Garg	Zubeen Garg	Zubeen Garg	Solo
1999	Pakhi	"Pakhi Meli Diye"	Zubeen Garg	Diganta Bharati	Solo	
1999	Pakhi	"Bukute Gupute"	Zubeen Garg	Zubeen Garg	Solo	
1999	Pakhi	"Pakhi Pakhi Ai Mon"	Zubeen Garg	Zubeen Garg	Solo	
1999	Pakhi	"Ahe Ba Nahe"	Zubeen Garg	Diganta Bharati	Solo	
1999	Pakhi	"Xikjapalioli"	Zubeen Garg	Zubeen G		
1999	Pakhi	"Dugalote Jen"	Zubeen Garg	Zubeen G	Pranita Baishya Medhi	
1999	Pakhi	"Tumi Dinor"	Zubeen Garg	Zubeen G	Solo	
1999	Pakhi	"Anguli Katilu"	Zubeen Garg	Diganta Bharati	Solo	
1999	Remix 99	"Pub Akasher (Remix)"	Remixed by Jatin Sharma	Anupam Saikia	Anupam Saikia, Santa Uzir	
2000	Sapun	"Nilim Akash Tirbir"	Zubeen Garg	Amarjyoti Chaudhary	Solo	
2000	Sapun	"Kola Soku Juri"	Zubeen Garg	Zubeen Garg	Solo	
2000	Nahor	"Pahi Meli Ulale"	Manas Robin	Manas Robin	Solo	
2000	Bhoomi	"Khuno Khuno"	Salim-Sulaiman	Srimanta Sankardev	Solo	
2001	Borosha Bohu Asha	"Jutuli Putuli"	Jatin Sharma	Shantu Sharma	Upasana	
2001	Borosha Bohu Asha	"Jurimoni O Jurimoni"	Jatin Sharma	Debeswar Saikia	Mahalakshmi Iyer	
2001	Posuwa	"Di Goisu Mur Thikona"	Krishnamoni Chutia	Krishnamoni Chutia		
2001	Jaanmoni 2001	"Dora Basi Basi"	Biman Baruah	Zubeen Garg	Bhitali Das, Mili Baruah, Nirmali Das	
2001	Jaanmoni 2001	"Hoi Ne Dhulia"	Biman Baruah	Biman Baruah	Krishnamoni Nath	
2001	Rongamoni	"Tinisukia Tilinga Mandir"	Krishnamoni Chutia	Krishnamoni Chutia	Bhitali Das	
2001	Rongamoni	"Mati Kolohor"	Krishnamoni Chutia	Krishnamoni Chutia	Bhitali Das	
2001	Panchoi	"Fagunor Posuwa"	Zubeen Garg	Zubeen Garg	Barnali Das	
2001	Panchoi	"Dukhor Bahi"	Zubeen Garg	Zubeen Garg	Barnali Das	
2001	Panchoi	"Hemeka Ei"	Zubeen Garg	Zubeen Garg	Barnali Das	
2001	Hiyamon	"Keufale Gujor Gumori"	Zubeen Garg	Diganta Bharati	Solo	
2001	Hiyamon	"Bhal paune"	Zubeen Garg	Manas Rabin		
2001	Hiyamon	" O Mure Lorar Maak"	Zubeen Garg	Diganta Bharati	Solo	
2001	Hiyamon	"Nokola kothati"	Zubeen Garg	Anup Baruah	Solo	
2001	Hiyamon	"Kunenu Jane"	Zubeen Garg	Anup Baruah		
2001	Hiyamon	"Bisora Morom"	Zubeen Garg	Diganta Bharati		
2001	Hiyamon	"Owfuliya"	Zubeen Garg	Zubeen Garg		
2001	Hiyamon	"Bongohor Deu"	Zubeen Garg	Diganta Bharati		
2001	Hiyamon	"O Nobou O"	Zubeen Garg	Manas Robin		
2001	Hiyamon	"Monore Dapunote"	Zubeen Garg	Manas Robin		
2002	Shishu	"Mugdho Hiya Mor"	Zubeen Garg	Zubeen Garg	Jonkey	
2002	Shishu	"Diya Ghurai Diya"	Zubeen Garg	Zubeen Garg	Solo	
2002	Shishu	"Bhoba Kotha"	Zubeen Garg	Zubeen Garg	Solo	
2002	Shishu	"Kar Porosh"	Zubeen Garg	Zubeen Garg	Solo	
2002	Shishu	"Xanti Diya"	Zubeen Garg	Zubeen Garg	Solo	
2002	Shishu	"Awushire Jon Mur'	Zubeen Garg	Zubeen Garg	Jonkey	
2002	Shishu	"Kahi Bati'	Zubeen Garg	Zubeen Garg	Solo	
2002	Shishu	"Nidiya Nidiya"	Zubeen Garg	Manas Rabin	Solo	
2002	Indradhanu	"Mur Jibonor Akashote"	Bijoy Talukdar	Bishnu Prasad Rabha	Sagarika	
2002	Bihuwan	"Bare Kisim Bhabonai"	Zubeen Garg	Zubeen Garg	Bhitali Das	
2002	Sandhya	"Nital Nixar Aji"	Zubeen Garg	Ambikagiri Raichoudhary	Solo	
2002	Sandhya	"Baje Kar Kinu"	Zubeen Garg	Ambikagiri Raichoudhary	Solo	
2002	Sandhya	"Mur Kalpana Mondito"	Zubeen Garg	Ambikagiri Raichoudhary	Solo	
2002	Sandhya	"Pranor Madhuri"	Zubeen Garg	Ambikagiri Raichoudhary	Solo	
2002	Sandhya	"Ki Sukh Lobhisa"	Zubeen Garg	Ambikagiri Raichoudhary	Solo	
2002	Sandhya	"Riniki Rinniki"	Zubeen Garg	Ambikagiri Raichoudhary	Solo	
2002	Akou Hiyamon	"Sup Thak Sup Thak"	Zubeen Garg	Anup Baruah, Diganta Bharati,Manas Rabin		
2002	Akou Hiyamon	"Ni Nilikhu"	Zubeen Garg	Anup Baruah, Diganta Bharati,Manas Rabin		
2002	Akou Hiyamon	"Soklong Pale Aahi"	Zubeen Garg	Anup Baruah, Diganta Bharati,Manas Rabin		
2002	Akou Hiyamon	"Aghuna Bapur"	Zubeen Garg	Anup Baruah, Diganta Bharati,Manas Rabin		
2002	Akou Hiyamon	"Aage Pase Dekha Nai"	Zubeen Garg	Anup Baruah, Diganta Bharati,Manas Rabin		
2002	Akou Hiyamon	"Karbala"	Zubeen Garg	Anup Baruah, Diganta Bharati,Manas Rabin		
2002	Akou Hiyamon	"Kokaideo"	Zubeen Garg	Anup Baruah, Diganta Bharati,Manas Rabin		
2002	Akou Hiyamon	"Kunenu Jane"	Zubeen Garg	Anup Baruah, Diganta Bharati,Manas Rabin		
2002	Sinaki Mon	"Bhal Pau Ne"	Zubeen Garg, Biman Baruah, Arup Dutta	Zubeen Garg		
2002	Sinaki Mon	"Aijow Makoon"	Zubeen Garg, Biman Baruah, Arup Dutta	Zubeen Garg		
2002	Sinaki Mon	"Tir Kope"	Zubeen Garg, Biman Baruah, Arup Dutta	Manas Robin		
2002	Sinaki Mon	"Uki Mari"	Zubeen Garg, Biman Baruah, Arup Dutta	Diganta Bharati		
2002	Sinaki Mon	"Bogi Jamu Kore"	Zubeen Garg, Biman Baruah, Arup Dutta	Zubeen Garg		
2002	Sinaki Mon	"Debotaiu Nubujile"	Zubeen Garg, Biman Baruah, Arup Dutta	Zubeen Garg		
2002	Sinaki Mon	"Renu"	Zubeen Garg, Biman Baruah, Arup Dutta	Zubeen Garg		
2002	Sinaki Mon	"Moi Morim Jidina"	Zubeen Garg, Biman Baruah, Arup Dutta	Zubeen Garg		
2003	Keteki	"Sang Ghor Dhuniya"	Manas Robin	Manas Robin	Solo	
2003	Keteki	"Botah Borokhun"	Manas Robin	Manas Robin	Tarali Sarma	
2003	Keteki	"Pori Bisonate"	Manas Robin	Manas Robin	Tarali Sarma	
2003	Poka Dhane Ringiyai	"Poka Dhane Ringiyai" (Title Track)	Manas Robin	Anandiram Das	Solo	
2004	Jantra	"Jantra"	Zubeen Garg	Zubeen Garg,	Solo	
2004	Jantra	"Aei Mayar Dhorat"	Zubeen Garg	Zubeen Garg,	Solo	
2004	Jantra	"I Love You"	Zubeen Garg	Zubeen Garg,	Solo	
2004	Jantra	"Maina Maina"	Zubeen Garg	Zubeen Garg,	Solo	
2004	Jantra	"Majulir Aejoni"	Zubeen Garg	Manas Robin,	Rupa Mili	
2004	Jantra	"Nejanu Mon Dole"	Zubeen Garg	Prasanta Bordoloi,	Solo	
2004	Jantra	"O Mor Apunar Dekh"	Zubeen Garg	Lakshminath Bezbarua,	Solo	
2004	Jantra	"Tumar Mitha Ei Saoni"	Zubeen Garg	Pankaj Sarmah	Solo	
2004	Jantra	"Olop xanti diya"	Zubeen Garg	Zubeen Garg	Solo	
2004	Lajuki Mon	"Sip Sip Borokhunot"	Zubeen Garg	Manas Rabin		
2004	Lajuki Mon	"Dhinki Dhin Dao"	Zubeen Garg	Zubeen Garg		
2004	Lajuki Mon	"Janilu Bujilu"	Zubeen Garg	Diganta Sharma		
2004	Lajuki Mon	"Ejaru Nuphule"	Zubeen Garg, Manas Robin	Manas Robin		
2004	Lajuki Mon	"Gaa Bhora Boyokhor"	Zubeen Garg			
2004	Lajuki Mon	"Kali Rati"	Zubeen Garg, Manas Robin	Manas Robin		
2004	Lajuki Mon	"Nongola Mukhote"	Zubeen Garg, Manas Robin			
2004	Lajuki Mon	"Patoliya Morome"	Zubeen Garg, Manas Robin			
2004	Rongmon	"Mur morom"	Zubeen Garg , Arup Baruah, Diganta Bharati	Diganta Bharati		
2004	Rongmon	"Rongmon kokaye"	Zubeen Garg , Arup Baruah, Diganta Bharati	Diganta Bharati		
2004	Rongmon	"Monore bhitorot"	Zubeen Garg , Arup Baruah, Diganta Bharati	Diganta Bharati		
2004	Rongmon	"Toi rupohi"	Zubeen Garg , Arup Baruah, Diganta Bharati	Diganta Bharati		
2004	Rongmon	"Gagori kokalot"	Zubeen Garg , Arup Baruah, Diganta Bharati	Diganta Bharati		
2004	Rongmon	"Kinu bandhonore"	Zubeen Garg , Arup Baruah, Diganta Bharati	Diganta Bharati		
2004	Rongmon	"Dihingor gora"	Zubeen Garg , Arup Baruah, Diganta Bharati	Diganta Bharati		
2005	Bishnu	"Morilu Morilu"	Manas Robin	Manas Robin	Solo	
2005	Ringa Ringa Mon	"Pakhi Loga Mone"	Zubeen Garg, Arup Baruah	Arup Baruah, Diganta Bharati		
2005	Ringa Ringa Mon	"Bhulotu Nasaba Tumi"	Zubeen Garg, Arup Baruah	Arup Baruah, Diganta Bharati		
2005	Ringa Ringa Mon	"Mori Jam Mori Jam"	Zubeen Garg, Arup Baruah	Arup Baruah, Diganta Bharati		
2005	Ringa Ringa Mon	"Juwa Bosorei"	Zubeen Garg, Arup Baruah	Arup Baruah, Diganta Bharati		
2005	Ringa Ringa Mon	"Iman Morom"	Zubeen Garg, Arup Baruah	Arup Baruah, Diganta Bharati		
2005	Ringa Ringa Mon	"O Panoi Oi"	Zubeen Garg, Arup Baruah	Arup Baruah, Diganta Bharati		
2005	Ringa Ringa Mon	"Monore Majote"	Zubeen Garg, Arup Baruah	Arup Baruah, Diganta Bharati		
2005	Ringa Ringa Mon	"Nubuju Nubuju"	Zubeen Garg, Arup Baruah	Arup Baruah, Diganta Bharati		
2005	Ringa Ringa Mon	"Ringa Ringa Mon"	Zubeen Garg, Arup Baruah	Arup Baruah, Diganta Bharati		
2005	Ringa Ringa Mon	"Money Bagot Kunu Eijoni"	Zubeen Garg, Arup Baruah	Arup Baruah, Diganta Bharati		
2006	Mukha	"Mukha Mukha"	Zubeen Garg	Zubeen Garg,	Solo	
2006	Mukha	"Sweet Love"	Zubeen Garg	Zubeen Garg,	Solo	
2006	Mukha	"Paamne Moi Ghurai"	Zubeen Garg	Zubeen Garg,	Solo	
2006	Mukha	"Baby Buli"	Zubeen Garg	Diganta Bharati,	Solo	
2006	Mukha	"Niyorore Phool"	Zubeen Garg	Nabakanta Barua	Solo	
2006	Mukha	"Dusokure Nilare"	Zubeen Garg	Zubeen Garg,	Solo	
2006	Mukha	"Niyore"	Zubeen Garg	Zubeen Garg,	Solo	
2006	Mukha	"Bukute Bukukhon"	Zubeen Garg	Diganta Bharati,	Solo	
2006	Borokhun	"Kor Ejak"	Zubeen Garg	Bhabendra Nath Saikia	Anindita Paul	
2006	Borokhun	"Diya Muk"	Zubeen Garg	Bhabendra Nath Saikia	Anindita Paul	
2006	Borokhun	"Tupal Tupal "	Zubeen Garg	Nabakanta Baruah	Solo	
2006	Borokhun	"O Mur Ronor Teji Ghora"	Zubeen Garg	Hiren Bhattacharyyan	Solo	
2006	Borokhun	"Aepahi Bokule"	Zubeen Garg	Ananda Chandra Baruah	Solo	
2006	Borokhun	"Aane Jua Bate"	Zubeen Garg	Keshab Mahanta	Solo	
2006	Borokhun	"Beli Poru Poru"	Zubeen Garg	Ganesh Gogol	Solo	
2006	Borokhun	"Aji Punya"	Zubeen Garg		Solo	
2006	Unmona Mon	"Saal Singile"	Zubeen Garg	Arup Baruah, Diganta Bharati		
2006	Unmona Mon	"Jaboloi Khujute"	Zubeen Garg, Anup Baruah	Arup Baruah, Diganta Bharati		
2006	Unmona Mon	"Puwane Aabeli"	Zubeen Garg, Anup Baruah	Arup Baruah, Diganta Bharati		
2006	Unmona Mon	"Joli Joli Sai Hua"	Zubeen Garg, Anup Baruah	Arup Baruah, Diganta Bharati		
2006	Unmona Mon	"Bujiwu Nubujane"	Zubeen Garg	Arup Baruah, Diganta Bharati		
2006	Unmona Mon	"Kakhot Kolokhi"	Zubeen Garg, Diganta Bharati	Arup Baruah, Diganta Bharati		
2006	Unmona Mon	"Kumol Sawul"	Zubeen Garg	Arup Baruah, Diganta Bharati		
2006	Unmona Mon	"Ukhol Makhol"	Zubeen Garg	Arup Baruah, Diganta Bharati		
2006	Unmona Mon	"Naar Neiya Re"	Zubeen Garg	Arup Baruah, Diganta Bharati		
2007	Dakku Daddy	"My World"	Ishq Bector		Ishq Bector	
2007	Unmona Mon	"Saal Singile"	Zubeen Garg	Diganta Bharati		
2007	Unmona Mon	"Kakhot Kolosi"	Diganta Bharati,Zubeen Garg	Diganta Bharati	Solo	
2007	Unmona Mon	"Ujonire Rail Khoni"	Zubeen Garg, Prasenjit Lahon	Diganta Bharati		
2007	Theatre 2007	"Tumi Janane Xagor Gabhir Kiman "	Zubeen Garg	Anup Baruah		
2007	Theatre 2007	"Aji Mon Uru Uru "	Zubeen Garg	Anup Baruah		
2008	Rumaal	"Duporor Muhonat”	Zubeen Garg	Diganta Bharati,	Solo	
2008	Rumaal	"Rumaal Rumaal"	Zubeen Garg	Zubeen Garg,	Solo	
2008	Rumaal	"Aai Mur Oi"	Zubeen Garg	Zubeen Garg,	Solo	
2008	Rumaal	"Amanikha"	Zubeen Garg	Ibson Lal Baruah	Solo	
2008	Rumaal	"Tumi Hkhubakh"	Zubeen Garg	Zubeen Garg,	Solo	
2008	Rumaal	"Hai Hai Mari Dila"	Zubeen Garg	Zubeen Garg,	Solo	
2008	Rumaal	"Ki Dore"	Zubeen Garg	Diganta Bharati,	Solo	
2008	Rumaal	"Swargodeu Sukafa"	Zubeen Garg	Manas Robin,	Solo	
2008	Jonaki Mon	"Bogakoi Bogoli"	Zubeen Garg		Solo	
2008	Jonaki Mon	"Bogakoi Bogoli"	Zubeen Garg	Diganta Bharati		
2008	Jonaki Mon	"Bogakoi Bogoli"	Zubeen Garg	Diganta Bharati		
2008	Jonaki Mon	"Agoli Bahore "	Zubeen Garg	Diganta Bharati		
2008	Jonaki Mon	"Janilu Janilu"	Zubeen Garg	Diganta Bharati	Solo	
2008	Jonaki Mon	"Pakhite Pakhi Logai"	Zubeen Garg	Diganta Bharati		
2008	Jonaki Mon	"Ulomi Ulomi Thake"	Zubeen Garg, Diganta Bharati	Diganta Bharati		
2008	Jonaki Mon	"Aeri Najabi"	Zubeen Garg, Diganta Bharati	Diganta Bharati		
2008	Jonaki Mon	"Hur Hur Hur"	Zubeen Garg, Diganta Bharati	Diganta Bharati		
2008	Jonaki Mon	"Ghila Ghuradi"	Zubeen Garg, Diganta Bharati	Diganta Bharati		
2008	Aximot Heral Xima	"Aximot Heral Xima "	Zubeen Garg	Zubeen Garg		
2009	Aloxua mon	"Nao Loi Anim Goi"	Diganta Bharati, Zubeen Garg	Anup Baruah		
2009	Aloxua mon	"Sokulore Mala "	Diganta Bharati, Zubeen Garg	Diganta Bharati	Solo	
2009	Abhimani Mon	"Pogola Pogola"	Zubeen Garg, Diganta Bharati	Diganta Bharati		
2009	Abhimani Mon	"Lahe Dei"	Zubeen Garg, Diganta Bharati	Diganta Bharati		
2009	Abhimani Mon	"Kolia Meghe"	Zubeen Garg, Diganta Bharati	Diganta Bharati		
2009	Abhimani Mon	"Sui Sabo De"	Zubeen Garg, Diganta Bharati	Diganta Bharati		
2009	Abhimani Mon	"Sukolure Mela"	Zubeen Garg, Diganta Bharati	Diganta Bharati		
2009	Abhimani Mon	"Masor Bhale Paw"	Zubeen Garg, Diganta Bharati	Diganta Bharati		
2009	Abhimani Mon	"Nao Loi Aahim"	Zubeen Garg, Diganta Bharati	Diganta Bharati		
2009	Abhimani Mon	"Dhin Dhin Dhin"	Zubeen Garg, Diganta Bharati	Diganta Bharati		
2010	Abujon Mon	"Dhori Thuwa Abujon Mon "	Zubeen Garg	Diganta Bharati		
2010	Abujon Mon	"Phati Goli Phuti Gol"	Zubeen Garg	Diganta Bharati		
2010	Abujon Mon	"Gun Gun"	Zubeen Garg	Diganta Bharati		
2010	Abujon Mon	"Duti Uthe Ebar"	Zubeen Garg	Diganta Bharati		
2010	Abujon Mon	"Heshi Theli"	Zubeen Garg	Diganta Bharati		
2010	Abujon Mon	"Rimjhim"	Zubeen Garg	Diganta Bharati		
2010	Abujon Mon	"Dora Koina Khel"	Zubeen Garg	Diganta Bharati		
2010	Abujon Mon	"Puhoror Dhol"	Zubeen Garg	Diganta Bharati		
2011	Baahi	"Hkhopun Rongor"	Zubeen Garg	Zubeen Garg,	Solo	
2011	Baahi	"Loiya Hari Naam"	Zubeen Garg	Zubeen Garg,	Solo	
2011	Baahi	"Bahi(Mix)"	Zubeen Garg	Zubeen Garg,	Solo	
2011	Baahi	"Sloka"	Zubeen Garg	Zubeen Garg,	Solo	
2011	Baahi	"Dhuli Uruwai"	Zubeen Garg	Diganta Bharati,	Solo	
2011	Baahi	"Bahi Tumi"	Zubeen Garg	Zubeen Garg,	Solo	
2011	Baahi	"Anuradha"	Zubeen Garg	Zubeen Garg,	Solo	
2011	Baahi	"Tumi Kun"	Zubeen Garg	Zubeen Garg,	Solo	
2011	Baahi	"Ghuri Suwasun"	Zubeen Garg	Zubeen Garg,	Solo	
2011	Baahi	"Herou Baahi"	Zubeen Garg	Hiren Bhattacharyya	Solo	
2011	Brahmaputra Theater	"Diu Nidiu Koi"	Zubeen Garg	Zubeen Garg		
2012	Rock	"Rock Rock"	Zubeen Garg	Zubeen Garg	Solo	
2012	Rock	"Ejak Borokhune"	Zubeen Garg	Zubern Garg	Solo	
2012	Rock	"Bokul Phulor Dore"	Zubeen Garg	Hiren Bhattacharyya	Solo	
2012	Rock	"Kajol Kajol"	Zubeen Garg	Ajoy Phukan	Solo	
2012	Rock	"Tip Tip"	Zubeen Garg	Zubeen Garg	Solo	
2012	Rock	"Senorita"	Zubeen Garg	Zubeen Garg	Solo	
2012	Rock	"Gaan Diya"	Zubeen Garg	Zubeen Garg	Solo	
2012	Rock	"Jiu Tumi"	Zubeen Garg	Zubern Garg	Solo	
2012	Rock	"Bismillah"	Zubeen Garg	Zubeen Garg	Solo	
2012	Rock	"Dusokure Nilimate"	Zubeen Garg	Zubeen Garg	Zublee	
2012	Rock	"Guri Guri hom"	Zubeen Garg	Diganta Bharati	Solo	
2012	Rock	"Rajani Dhukhor"	Zubeen Garg	Zubeen Garg	Solo	
2012	Rock	"Swadhinataa"	Zubeen Garg	Zubeen Garg	Solo	
2012	Rock	"Tumi Prajaapati"	Zubeen Garg	Zubeen Garg	Solo	
2012	Runjun	"Runjun Nupure Mate"	Zubeen Garg	Kailash Nath Sharma	Solo	
2012	Runjun	"Polaxor Rang"	Zubeen Garg	Kailash Nath Sharma	Treen	
2012	Runjun	"Jibon Dinga"	Zubeen Garg	Kailash Nath Sharma	Solo	
2012	Runjun	"Uduli Muduli"	Zubeen Garg	Kailash Nath Sharma	Solo	
2012	Runjun	"Xubhra Bolakai"	Zubeen Garg	Kailash Nath Sharma	Anindita Paul	
2012	Runjun	"Xunil gagan Juri"	Zubeen Garg	Kailash Nath Sharma	Solo	
2012	Runjun	"Nikha Tuponi"	Zubeen Garg	Kailash Nath Sharma	Solo	
2012	Canvas	"Nupur Priya"	Zubeen Garg	Diganta Bharati		
2013	Xaratar Pratham Nixa	"Soku Meli Suwana"	Zubeen Garg	Zubeen Garg	Priyanka Bharali	
2013	Xaratar Pratham Nixa	"More Priya "	Zubeen Garg	Zubeen Garg	Priyanka Bharali	
2014	Nahor	"Nahor"	Zubeen Garg	Manas Rabin		
2015	Junuka	"Junuka"	Zubeen Garg	Zubeen Garg	Ritrisha	
2019	Maa	"Mur Monore Kalpanat"	Zubeen Garg	Zubeen Garg	Solo	
2019	Maa	"Ketiyaba"	Zubeen Garg	Zubeen Garg	Solo	
2019	Maa	"Nisukoni Geet"	Zubeen Garg	Zubeen Garg	Solo	
2019	Maa	"Popiya Tora"	Zubeen Garg	Rahul Gautam Sharma	Solo	
2019	Maa	"Hkheuji Pakhire"	Zubeen Garg	Sasanka Samir	Solo	
2019	Maa	"Aakhore"	Zubeen Garg	Rahul Gautam Sharma	Solo	
2019	Maa	"Mur Maa"	Zubeen Garg	Sasanka Samir	Solo	
2019	Maa	"Politics Nokoriba Bondhu"	Zubeen Garg	Zubeen Garg	Solo	
2020 - 23	Silaa	"Silaa"	Zubeen Garg	Zubeen Garg	Solo	
2020 - 23	Silaa	"Ubhoti Suwa"	Zubeen Garg	Rahul Gautam Sharma	Solo	
2020 - 23	Silaa	"Agnibinar Taan"	Zubeen Garg	Ambikagiri Raichoudhury	Solo	
2020 - 23	Silaa	"Eku Je Nai"	Zubeen Garg	Zubeen Garg	Solo	
2020 - 23	Silaa	"Monore Koina"	Zubeen Garg	Zubeen Garg, Rahul Gautam Sharma	Solo	
2020 - 23	Silaa	"Bihogi Kobitar Raati"	Zubeen Garg	Garima Saikia Garg	Solo	

=== Assamese Theatre Songs ===
Year	Theatre	Drama	Song	Music Director	Lyricist(s)	Co-signer (s)	Ref
2008-09	Hengool Theatre	Soku	"Tumi Dusokute"	Palash Surya Gogoi	Palash Surya Gogoi	Solo	
2009-10	Hengool Theatre	Jonakor Boroxun	"Sokule Sai"	Palash Surya Gogoi	Palash Surya Gogoi	Chayanika Bhuyan	
2010-11	Kohinoor Theatre	Rumaal	"Aasu Xutare Epahi"	Biman Bora	Biman Bora	Solo	
2011-12	Theatre Bhagyadevi	Malabika Mur Bandhobi	"Kolija Kolija"	Palash Surya Gogoi	Palash Surya Gogoi	Solo	
2011-12	Hengool Theatre	Somok	"Dum Dum"	Papu	Palash Surya Gogoi	Solo	
2011-12	Srimanta Shankardev Theatre	Luka Bhaku	"Luka Bhaku"	Arup Dutta	Mausam Gogoi	Solo	
2012-13	Kohinoor Theatre	Hiyat Epahi Gulap	"Hiyat Epahi Gulap"	Diganta Bharati	Diganta Bharati	Priyanka Bharali	
2013-14	Itihash Theatre	Dokait	"Rongin Rongin"	Ajoy Phukan	Ajoy Phukan	Solo	
2017–18	Theatre Bhagyadevi	Jonbailoi Sithi	"Jonbailoi Sithi"	Ajoy Phukan	Ajoy Phukan	Ritrisha Sharma	
2017–18	Abahan Theatre	Moi Maar Suwali	"Gaan Ati Guwa Nah"	Ajoy Phukan	Ajoy Phukan	Solo	
2017–18	Abahan Theatre	Moi Maar Suwali	"Nilim Nilim Morom"	Ajoy Phukan	Ajoy Phukan	Solo	
2018–19	Rajtilak Theatre	Mayabi Xontan	"O Maya"	Ajoy Phukan	Abhijit Bhattacharya, Ajoy Phukan	Rakesh Riyan, Chayanika Bhuyan	
2018–19	Bordoisila Theatre	Priyotoma	"Priyotoma"	Ajoy Phukan	Abhijit Bhattacharya, Ajoy Phukan	Gayatri Mahanta	
2018–19	Abahan Theatre	Madhuri Mor Naam	"Meghali Meghali"	Ajoy Phukan	Ajoy Phukan	Gitali	
2018–19	Abahan Theatre	Madhuri Mor Naam	"Kot Mur Maa"	Ajoy Phukan, (Original 100 Miles song)	Abhijit Bhattacharya, Ajoy Phukan (Ref. by 100 Miles song)	Papori Gogoi	
2018–19	Chiranjib Theatre	Rajkumarir Biya	"O Deuta"	Ajoy Phukan	Abhijit Bhattacharya	Solo	
2018–19	Hengool Theatre	Mahabir	"Ki Hobo Ei Jibon"	Sibabrat Sharma	Parikshit Kalita	Nabanita Sharma	
2018–19	Itihash Theatre	Dokaitor Tez	"Hello Majoni"	Ajoy Phukan	Abhijit Bhattacharya	Solo	
2018–19	Theatre Bhagyadevi	Ajir Chanakya	"Rodali Tumi"	Palash Gogoi	Hrituv Hazarika	Rajshri Kalita	
2019-20	Abahan Theatre	Memsahab	"Dekhibole Moi Dhuniya"	Ajoy Phukan	Abhijit Bhattacharya	Solo	
2019-20	Abahan Theatre	Memsahab	"Jodihe Jibon Noi Parote"	Ajoy Phukan	Abhijit Bhattacharya	Solo	
2019-20	Bordoisila Theatre	Mahiyokhi	"Koina Oi"	Ajoy Phukan	Abhijit Bhattacharya	Solo	
2019-20	Bordoisila Theatre	Moromor Bandhobi Bidai Diya	"Moromor Bandhobi Bidai Diya"	Ajoy Phukan	Abhijit Bhattacharya, Ajoy Phukan	Parveen Hussain	
2019-20	Theatre Surya	Iman Morom Kio Lage	"Iman Morom Kio Lage"	Ajoy Phukan	Abhijit Bhattacharya	Papori Gogoi	
2019-20	Kohinoor Theatre	Boroxa Jetiya Name	"Boroxa Jetiya Name"	Paran Borkotoky	Rajdweep	Solo	
2019-20	Kohinoor Theatre	Mur Tezot Tumare Naam	"Mur Tezot Tumare Naam"	Ajoy Phukon	Ajoy Phukon	Solo	
2019-20	Hengool Theatre	Bahadur	"Bahadur"	Arupjyoti Baruah	Rajdweep	Solo	
2021-22	Udayan Theater	Sitar Agnipariksha	"Satoboroniya"	Jekib	Nekib	Rupali Kashyap	
2021-22	Abahan Theatre	Joymoti	"Joya Nai"	Ajoy Phukan	Abhijit Bhattacharjya	Solo	
2022-23	Brindaban Theater	Rajkannya	"Boroxun"	Jayanta Kakati	Sasanka Samir	Solo	
2022-23	Brindaban Theater	Bohag	"Duronire Puhor"		Rahul Gautam	Sanskrita	https://www.youtube.com/watch?v=9NWMyzI_v6c
2022-23	Itihash Theatre	Morom Bisari Jau Bola	"Morom Bisari Jau Bola"	Ajoy Phukan	Ajoy Phukan, Abhijit Bhattacharjya	Papori Gogoi	
2023-24	Hengool Theatre	Soku	"Tumi Dusokute"	Palash Surya Gogoi	Palash Surya Gogoi		https://www.youtube.com/watch?v=TojUyd1oqgs
2023-24	Itihash Theatre	Captain Abinash	"Morom Morom"	Ajoy Phukan	Ajoy Phukan	Papori Gogoi	
2024-25	Hengool Theatre	Drama not mentioned	"Nila Khamor Sithi"	Arupjyoti Baruah	Arupjyoti Baruah, Dr. Jharna Choudhury		https://www.youtube.com/watch?v=F_C3Qb1E6Bs
2024-25	Itihash Theatre	Maharaj	"Alenge Alenge"	Ajoy Phukan	Abhijit Bhattacharya		https://www.youtube.com/watch?v=sixwykLD2ng
2025-26	Itihash Theatre	Dorajatri	"Eti Gaan"	Ajoy Phukan	Ajay Phukan, Abhijit Bhattacharja	Solo	https://www.youtube.com/watch?v=PoXpnx-LplQ
2025-26	Rajdhani Theatre	Bixorjan	"Batore Hekhote"	Jayanta Kakati	Bijit	Solo	
2025-26	Bordoisila Theatre	Ravan	"Boturuwa"	Rajdweep	Rajdweep	Aasthajitaa Nanda	
2025-26	Theatre Surjya	Mur Sokulure Ekap Sah	"Tick Tock Tick Tock"	Ajoy Phukan	Abhijit Bhattacharjya	Papori Gogoi	
2025-26	Theatre Kalaguru	Moi Bastab Phukanor Preyaxi	"Dusoku Tuli"	Jayanta Kakati	Bijit	Arundhati Bhanupriya	
2025-26	Theatre Kalaguru	Moi Bastab Phukanor Preyaxi	"Kothati Kuwa"	Ajoy Phukan	Ajoy Phukan	Sarodee Borah	
2026-27	Hengool Theatre	Drama not mentioned	"Sokule Sai"			Solo	https://www.youtube.com/watch?v=c5P6RL7c-ag
2026-27	Kohinoor Theatre	Bivatswa	"Dusokure Kajolote"	Ajoy Phukan	Ajoy Phukan	Chayanika Bhuyan	https://www.youtube.com/watch?v=urP61P55330
2026-27	Brindaban Theater	Rono Hoonkaar	"Jonak"	Bijit	Jayanta Kakati	Solo	https://www.youtube.com/watch?v=upefnaPQuEA

=== Assamese Television songs ===
Year	Serial/show	Song	Composer(s)	Writer(s)	Co-singer(s)	Ref.
2011	Anuradha	"Anuradha"	Zubeen Garg	Zubeen Garg	Trin Sarma	
2012	Meghranjani	"Meghranjani"	Porikshit Kalita	Porikshit Kalita	Solo	
2012	Junakor Borokhun	"Junakor Borokhun"	Fourplay	Zubeen Garg	Solo	
2019	Kanchan	"Mone Ki Bisare O Kanchan"	Porikshit Kalita	Porikshit Kalita	Solo	
2022	Hridoyor Gaan	"Hridoyor Gaan"	Dikshu Sharma	Bijiyeta Patgiri	Solo	
2022	Mayur Pankhi	"Mayur Pankhi"	Poran Borkotoky	Sasanka Samir	Solo	
2022	Mayabini Ratir Bukut	"Mayabini Ratir Bukut"		Garima Saikia Garg		https://www.youtube.com/watch?v=nFqP0SyfVsA

=== Assamese Singles ===
==== Pop Song ====
Year	Song	Composer(s)	Writer(s)	Co-singer(s)	Notes/Ref.
1997	"Phool Phulok Rodore Phool"	Zubeen Garg	Dwijendra Mohan Sharma	Solo	His first Assamese single dedicated in memory of Boikuntha Nath Gogoi While this single aired in All India Radio in April 1997, the music video does not exist. Later, it was released as a part of his album Mukti.
2021	"Maa"	Jayanta Kakati	Jayanta Kakati	Solo	
2021	"Runjun"	Kritiman Red	Kritiman Red	Kashmiri deka	
2022	"Loi Jaa"	Debesh Roy	Debesh Roy	Dorothy Bordoloi	
2022	"Tuk Sai Thakile"	Dr. Lohit Rohit	Dr. Lohit Rohit	Solo	
2022	"Emuthi Aabir"	Jayanta Kakati	Sasanka Samir	Rituraani Mousumi	
2022	"Saati"	Rahul Gautam Sharma	Rahul Gautam Sharma	Zublee Baruah	
2022	"Mur Boxonto"	Mrinmoy Sarmah & Ashwin Sarmah	Kukil Pratim	Solo	
2022	"Ebar Jodi Kuwa"	Ikram H Juwel	Ikram H Juwel	Shatabdi Borah	
2022	"Rode Boroxune"	Prasenjit Lahon	Dhrubajyoti Rajkhowa	Dr Anjali Chutia Saikia	
2022	"Kothiyadora"	Abhi Saikia	Prasanta Das	Solo	
2022		Rupam Raaz Pathak	Rupam Raaz Pathak	Solo	
2022	"Kajoli"	Rekibul	Rekibul	Solo	
2022	"Dada"	Kumaresh Kaushik	Kumaresh Kaushik	Nirbhita Borah	
2022	"Prem Lipir Aakhor"	Sumon Kashyap, Shibananda Baruah	Bikas Bora	Manashee Devi	
2022	"Asune Kuxole"	Sumit Gogoi, Bijoy Sankar	Sumit Gogoi	Priyanka Bharali	
2022	"Boroxare Sesa Tupal"	Kritiman Red	Chayanika Nath & Arindam Das	Rimzim Kalita	
2023	"Balimahi"	Bozropat Music	Maitrayee Patar	Solo	[281]
2023	"Jaan Buli Nematiba"	Keshab Nayan	Keshab Nayan	Dibya Das	
2023	"Lahi Lahi"	Sibabrata Sharma	Zubeen Garg	Dr. Aditi Das	
2023	Jai Bhole	Swarup Kakati	Swarup Kakati	Solo	
2023	Bihogi Kobita	Zubeen Garg	Garima Saikia Garg	Solo	
2023	Nishigandha	Aarxslan	Rajib Bhuyan	Sanidhya Bhuyan	
2024	"Tupa Tupe"	Atonu Gautam	Sasanka Samir	Solo	
2025	"Osinaki Kun Tumi"	Pradyut Baruah	Pradyut Baruah	Solo	
2025	"Batore Hekhote"	Jayanta Kakoti	Bijit	Solo	
2026	RONG | The Humming King	Zubeen Garg, Dorxon	Danish	Sanjib Bora	Premiered on 22 February 2026 https://www.youtube.com/watch?v=roHan2AmLMU

==== Theme Song ====
Year	Song	Composer(s)	Writer(s)	Co-Singer(s)	Notes/Ref.
2017	Aji Sadiyar				Theme Song of Sadiya Festival
2010	Abhi Bhi			Arya Acharya	75th Azadi Ka Amrit Mahotsav Independence Day Special
2022	Alive India in Concert Theme Song	Supratiek Shyamal Ghosh	Supratiek Shyamal Ghosh, Lalpi Ghosh		https://www.youtube.com/watch?v=HxICjIoGPsg
2018	Amar Asom			Joi Borua, Neel Akashm Bornali	
2024	Ami Navodaya	Lakhyajit Konwar	Lakhyajit Konwar	Raja bhuyan	JNV Dibrugarh Silver Jubilee Alumni Song https://www.youtube.com/watch?v=g1dDbmXVOAM
2019	Anamika Theme Song Season 4			Babu Baruah	
2023	Assam Vidyapith HS School Theme Song	Ajoy Phukan		Babu Baruah, Rakesh Reeyan, Nekib Hussain, Pompi Gogoi, Ajoy Phukan	https://www.youtube.com/watch?v=R81DoDu953c
2016	BJP Theme Song	Poran Borkataky			
2023	Borthakur's IAS Academy				
2021	Brindaban Supermarket	Shekhar Goswami	Rahul Gautam Sharma		https://www.youtube.com/watch?v=f3M0ybwFjQA
2020	Chabua Idol Theme Song	Ajoy Phukan	Ajoy Phukan, Mridupaban	Babu, Diksu, Rakesh Reeyan, Ajoy Phukan	https://www.youtube.com/watch?v=czVc9ZjmgHQ
2022	Chandubi Festival				
2021	COVID-19 Vaccine				
2017	Diganta's Physiotherapy & Rehabilitation Centre Theme Song	Arupjyoti Baruah	Rahul Gautam Sarma		https://www.youtube.com/watch?v=1Dk4m1EY_-w
2020	Durdinor Bukut	Diganta Bharati	Diganta Bharati	Dimpi Sonowal, Diganta Bharati, Bhaswati Bharati, Skd, Chandan Das, Meenakshi, Arupjyoti Baruah	https://www.youtube.com/watch?v=XbDk-MhFvaY
2014	Election Theme Song				
2018	Fire & Emergency Service, Assam			Dr. Mausumi Saharia	
2018	Football Theme Song				
2023	GMC Hostel 4 Theme Song			Dr. Hitesh Baruah	
2021	GMC Theme Song	Shekhar Goswami	Sasanka Samir	Deashish Sharma, Joydeep Paul	
	Zubeen Garg Festival Song			Ajoy Phukan, Swaraj Das	
	HS and HSLC Theme Song			Rakesj Reeyan, Babu	
	Jai Jawan Jai Kisan			Supratiek Shyamal Ghosh, Ankita Kundu	
2011	Jeevan Kite Festival Theme Song				
	Kaziranga			Pallavi Bhargav	World Environment Day
2023	Khel Maharan				
2015	Micromax Unite Cricket Anthem				
2021	Mur Dekh	Hiren Bhattacharyya			Republic Day
	Namami Barak			Debojit Saha	
	Namami Brahmaputra			Papon	
2022	Jilikabo Dapun				ND24
2019	NE Star Studo Theme			Kumar Bhabesh	
	NRC Theme Song				
2023	Nuclear Academy			Sekher Jyoti, Dhurba jyoti	
	Ooo La La 91.9 Fm Title Song				
2021	Otut Axom				Assam Day
	Parg Cine Awards Theme Song				
2025	Sainik School Goalpara Golden Jublee Theme Song			Zublee Baruah	
	Startup Assam				
	Sur Sangam Theme Song			Sabika Jsan	
	Zubeen Artist Eleven			Ajoy Phukan, Babu Baruah	
2022	Ami jujim, Ami Jikim				National Games Gujarat
2022	Bir Lachit Borphukan				
2026	Census of India 2027 Theme Song		Pankaj Chakraborty		Composed in 2013 Release on 6th August 2026

==== Bihu Song ====
Year	Song	Composer(s)	Writer(s)	Co Singer(s)	Notes/Ref.
1999	"Brahmaputra Khoni"	Biman Baruah	Biman Baruah, Khagen Gogoi	Bhitali Das, Julika	First Assamese Bihu single. Originally supposed to appear as a part of Assamese bihu album Mamoni '99, it went unreleased.
2001	"Morom Dilu Sithi Dilu"	Biman Baruah	Biman Baruah	Bhitali Das	
2022	"Bihure Boliya"	Abhinob Borah	Traditional Folk	Nistha Priya	[293]
2023	"Tulung Vutung Naau"	Swarup Kakati	Swarup Kakati	Krishnaa Devi	[294]

== Hindi Songs ==
=== Hindi film songs ===
Year	Film	Song	Music director(s)	Writer(s)	Co-singer(s)		Notes/Ref.
1995	Gaddaar	"Beta Apni Maa Se"	Nadeem–Shravan	Sameer Anjaan	Solo		
1996	Rakshak	(Score)	Anand-Milind		Solo		
1997	Purani Kabar	"Kuch To Kahon"	Isfaquel	Vishu Raj	Solo		
1997	Purani Kabar	"Dil Mera Churaya Ek Hasina"	Isfaquel	Vishu Raj			
1998	Dil Se	"Pokhi Pokhi Bidekhi" (Score)	A. R. Rahman	Zubeen Garg	Solo		
1998	Doli Saja Ke Rakhna	(Score)	A. R. Rahman		Solo		
1999	Vaastav	(Score)	Sandeep Chowta		Solo		
2000	Fiza	"Mere Watan : Amaan's Fury"	Ranjit Barot	Gulzar	Solo		
2001	Mujhe Kucch Kehna Hai	"Guncha Hai Gul Hai"	Anu Malik	Sameer	Sonu Nigam, Raageshwari Loomba		Background vocal only; Not featured in the theatrical film Uncredited role
2001	Asoka	"Roshni Se"	Anu Malik	Gulzar	Abhijeet Bhattacharya, Alka Yagnik		
2002	Yeh Hai Jalwa	"Dhire Dhire"	Himesh Reshammiya	Sudhakar Sharma	Udit Narayan, Alka Yagnik		
2002	Yeh Hai Jalwa	"Carbon Copy - Part 1"	Himesh Reshammiya				
2002	Yeh Hai Jalwa	"Aankhen Pyari Hain"	Himesh Reshammiya				
2002	Yeh Hai Jalwa	"Carbon Copy - Part 2"	Himesh Reshammiya				
2002	Kaante	"Rama Re"	Anand Raaj Anand	Dev Kohli	Sanjay Dutt, Shaan, Anand Raaj Anand, Sudesh Bhosale		
2002	Kaante	"Socha Nahin Tha"	Anand Raaj Anand	Dev Kohli	Shaan		
2002	Kaante	"Rama Re (Thums Up Remix)"	Anand Raaj Anand	Dev Kohli	Sanjay Dutt, Shaan, Anand Raaj Anand, Sudesh Bhosale		
2002	Kaante	"Maahi Ve"	Anand Raaj Anand	Dev Kohli	Sukhwinder Singh, Richa Sharma		
2002	Jaal	"Jo Pyar Tumne"	Anand Raaj Anand	Sameer	Chithra, Anand Raj Anand		
2002	Sandhya	"Sandhya"	Anand Raaj Anand	Shaheen Iqbal	Solo		
2002	Hathyar	"Sanjay Dutt's Theme" (score)	Anand Raaj Anand		Solo		
2003	Valentine Days	"Jeena Jeena - English"	Jayanta Pathak	Roop Johari	KK, Mehnaaz		
2003	Valentine Days	"Jeena Jeena - Hindi"	Jayanta Pathak	Roop Johari	Leslie Lewis, Sanjeevani		
2003	Valentine Days	"Chahte Hain Pyaar"	Jayanta Pathak	Roop Johari	Swastika		
2003	Mumbai Se Aaya Mera Dost	"Koi Bheega He Rang Se"	Anu Malik	Sameer	Sonu Nigam, Alka Yagnik		
2003	Main Prem Ki Diwani Hoon	"Bani Bani"	Anu Malik	Dev Kohli	Chithra		
2003	Chupke Se	"Dildara"	Ranjit Barot	Abbas Tyrewala	Gayatri Ganjawala		
2003	Mudda	"Sapne Saare"	Jeet-Pritam	Saurabh Shukla	Solo		
2003	Mudda	"Khwabon Ki (Male Version)"	Jeet-Pritam	Saurabh Shukla	Hariharan		
2003	Mudda	"Khwabon Ki (Female Version)"	Jeet-Pritam	Saurabh Shukla	Kavita Krishnamurti		
2003	Plan	"Aane Wala Pal (2nd Version)"	Anand Raj Anand	Dev Kohli	Udit Narayan, Anand Raj Anand, Abhijeet Bhattacharya, Babul Supriyo		
2003	Plan	"Aane Wala Pal"	Anand Raj Anand	Dev Kohli	Udit Narayan, Anand Raj Anand, Abhijeet Bhattacharya, Babul Supriyo		
2004	Agnipankh	"Ishq Ishq Mein"	Pritam	Ravi Basnet	Kailash Kher, Jaspinder Narula, Salim Merchant		
2004	Agnipankh	"Rabba"	Pritam	Ravi Basnet	Kailash Kher, Jaspinder Narula		
2004	Aan	"Jugnu Ki Payal"	Anu Malik	Tejpal Kaur	Shashwati Phukan		
2004	Garv	"Marhaba"	Anu Malik	Dev Kohli	Sunidhi Chauhan		
2004	Ek Hasina Thi	"Ek Hasina Thi"	Amar Mohile		Dominique		
2004	Gayab	"Ek Hasina Thi (Remix)"	Amar Mohile		Dominique		
2004	Musafir	"Rama Re (The Boys Are Back Mix)"	Anand Raj Anand	Dev Kohli	Sanjay Dutt, Shaan		
2005	Fareb	"Jaaoon Kahan"	Anu Malik	Sayeed Quadri	Udit Narayan, Shraddha Pandit		
2005	Brides Wanted	"Payal Ki Cham Cham"	Ranjit Barot	Dev Kohli	Shibani Kashyap		Unreleased film
2006	Gangster	"Ya Ali"	Pritam	Sayeed Quadri	Solo		
2006	Gangster	"Ya Ali (Remix)"	Pritam	Sayeed Quadri	Solo		
2006	Strings	"Piya Milan Ko Jaana"	Zubeen Garg	Deepak Sneh	Solo		
2006	Strings	"Kaise Kahoon"	Zubeen Garg	Ajay Jhingran, Zubeen Garg	Shashwati Phukan		
2006	Strings	"Ishq Namazi"	Zubeen Garg	Minu Singh	Solo		
2006	Strings	"Ramo Ramo"	Zubeen Garg	Ajay Jhingran	Solo		
2006	Strings	"Rimjhim Rimjhim"	Zubeen Garg	Sumeet Acharya	Anindita Paul, Brishti Saikia		
2006	Strings	"Mantra (Om)"	Zubeen Garg	Baba Nagarjuna	Papon, Sourain Roy Choudhuri		
2006	Bas Ek Pal	"Zindagi Hosh Mein"	Vivek Philip	Amitabh Verma	KK		
2006	Bas Ek Pal	"Zindagi Hosh Mein (Remix)"	Vivek Philip	Amitabh Verma	Solo		
2006	Pyaar Ke Side Effects	"Jaane Kya"	Pritam	Mayur Puri	Solo		
2006	Zindaggi Rocks	"Rabbi"	Anu Malik	Mudassar Aziz	Sunidhi Chauhan, Krishna Beura		
2006	Zindaggi Rocks	"Rabbi (Remix)"	Anu Malik	Mudassar Aziz	Sunidhi Chauhan, Krishna Beura		
2006	I See You	"Subah Subah"	Vishal–Shekhar	Vishal Dadlani	Solo		
2006	I See You	"Subah Subah (Remix)"	Vishal–Shekhar	Vishal Dadlani	Solo		
2007	Nehlle Pe Dehlla	"Hoga Hoga Khuda Gawa"	Anand Raj Anand	Sameer	Solo		
2007	Kya Love Story Hai	"Jeena Kya Tere Bina"	Pritam		Solo		
2007	Kya Love Story Hai	"Jeena Kya Tere Bina (Remix)"	Pritam		Solo		
2007	Namastey London	"Dilruba"	Himesh Reshammiya	Javed Akhtar	Alisha Chinai		
2007	Namastey London	"Dilruba (Remix)"	Himesh Reshammiya	Javed Akhtar	Alisha Chinai		
2007	Big Brother	"Jag Lal Lal Lal"	Sandesh Shandilya	Anil Pandey	Solo		
2007	Big Brother	"Jag Lal Lal Lal (Version 3)"	Sandesh Shandilya	Anil Pandey	Ustad Sultan Khan		
2007	Life Mein Kabhie Kabhiee	"Hum Khushi Ki Chah Mein"	Lalit Pandit	Sameer	Solo		
2007	Life Mein Kabhie Kabhiee	"Hum Khushi Ki Chah Mein (Duet)"	Lalit Pandit	Sameer	Alka Yagnik		
2007	Good Boy, Bad Boy	"Dard-E-Dil"	Himesh Reshammiya	Sameer			
2007	Raqeeb	"Tum Ho"	Pritam	Sameer	Tulsi Kumar		
2007	Apne	"Ankh Vich" (Film Version)	Himesh Reshammiya	Sameer	Shaan, Kunal Ganjawala, Amrita Kak, Himesh Reshammiya		
2007	The Train	"Teri Tamanna"	Mithoon	Sayeed Quadri	Shilpa Rao, KK		
2007	The Train	"Teri Tamanna (Euro Mix)"	Mithoon	Sayeed Quadri	Shilpa Rao, KK		
2007	The Train	"Teri Tamanna (Club Mix)"	Mithoon	Sayeed Quadri	Shilpa Rao, KK		
2007	Jhoom Barabar Jhoom	"J-B-J"	Shankar–Ehsaan–Loy	Gulzar	Shankar Mahadevan, Sunidhi Chauhan		
2007	Bombay to Goa	"Let's Enjoy"	Nitin Shankar	Shabbir Ahmed	Solo		
2007	My Friend Ganesha	"Shael Sutta Ki Aankhon"	P. Shankar, Ahsan Ahmed, Nirmal-Shekar, R. Roy, Laxmi-Vasant	Ravi Verma			
2007	Naqaab	"Ek Din Teri Rahoon (Remix)"	Pritam	Sameer			
2007	Victoria No. 203	"Zindagi Aa Gayi"	Viju Shah	Verma Malik	Solo		
2007	Kaisay Kahein	"Kee Kasoor"	Pritam	Kunwar Juneja			
2007		"Woh Bheege Pal"	Jayesh Gandhi	Surendra Mishra, Jayesh Gandhi	Solo		
2008	Deshdrohi	"Tu Jaan Se Pyara"	Nikhil-Vinay	Kamal Rashid Khan	Shweta Pandit		
2008	Deshdrohi	"Tu Jaan Se Pyara" (Remix)	Nikhil-Vinay	Kamal Rashid Khan	Shweta Pandit		
2008	Deshdrohi	"Mere Halaat Yeh"	Nikhil-Vinay	Kamal Rashid Khan	Solo		
2008	Deshdrohi	"Mere Halaat Yeh (Version 2)"	Nikhil-Vinay	Kamal Rashid Khan	Solo		
2008	Tera Naam	"Chashme baddoor"	Vishnu Narayan	Rishi Azad	Solo		
2008	Hello	"Rab Ka Banda"	Sajid–Wajid	Jalees Sherwani	Sonu Nigam, Sunidhi Chauhan		
2008	Mission Istaanbul	"Dildara"	Anu Malik	Sameer	Sunidhi Chauhan		
2008	Hastey Hastey	"Almaada Sere Khuda"	Anu Malik	Sameer	Solo		
2008	Bombay to Bangkok	"Dheere Dheere"	Salim–Sulaiman	Mir Ali Husain	Solo		
2008	Bombay to Bangkok	"Dheere Dheere" (Remix)	Salim–Sulaiman	Mir Ali Husain	Solo		
2008	Bombay to Bangkok	"Chahe Juda Ho" (Movie Version)	Salim–Sulaiman	Mir Ali Husain	Solo		
2009	Key Club	"Ek Pal Tere Bina"	Sagar Desai		Solo		Solo
2009	Y.M.I. Yeh Mera India	"Bansuri"	Suhas, Siddharth, Kavita Seth	Kavita Seth, Aasrif Dehlvi, N. Chandra	Solo		
2009	Fast Forward	"Dil Mein Junoon Hai"	Dj Akbar Sami	Irshad Kamil, Shabbir Ahmed	Solo		
2009	London Dreams	"Shola Shola"	Shankar–Ehsaan–Loy	Prasoon Joshi	Solo		
2010	Daayen Ya Baayen	"Bhor Ka Saaj"	Vivek Philip		Solo		Solo
2010	Musaa-The Most Wanted	"Waqt Bada Baimaan"	Illyas, Jaideep, Santosh Sharma	Ibrahim Ashiq			Solo
2010	Musaa-The Most Wanted	"Dil Ne Jise Apna Kaha"	Illyas, Jaideep, Santosh Sharma	Ibrahim Ashiq			Solo
2010	Aashayein	"Ab Mujhko Jeena"	Salim–Sulaiman	Mir Ali Husain	Samishka Chandra		
2010	Aashayein	"Ab Mujhko Jeena" (Remix)	Salim–Sulaiman	Mir Ali Husain	Samishka Chandra		
2010	Kuchh Kariye	"Wajood Ki Talash Hai"	Onkar, Sumitra Iyyer	Salim Bijnori	Mahalakshmi Iyer, Navraj		
2010	Aakhari Decision	"Maula Mere Maula"	Hanif Sheikh		Solo		
2010	Aakhari Decision	"Maula Mere Maula" (Remix)	Hanif Sheikh		Solo		
2010	Mission 11 july	"Maula Reham Kar"	Afsar – Sajid	Shahab Allahabadi	Solo		
2011	Pal Pal Doley Mann	"Dil Doley"	Timothi Hanche Das, Biman Baruah, Arup Dutta	Pawan Mishra	Mahalakshmi Iyer		
2011	Pal Pal Doley Mann	"Poitha Bhat"	Timothi Hanche Das, Biman Baruah, Arup Dutta	Pawan Mishra	Mahalakshmi Iyer		
2011	Dum Maaro Dum	"Jaana Hai"	Pritam	Jaideep Sahni	Solo		
2012	Its Rocking Dard-e-Disco	"Mohabbat"	Bappi Lahiri	Virag Mishra	Alka Yagnik		
2012	OMG – Oh My God!	"Oh My God (Soundtrack)"	Himesh Reshammiya	Shabbir Ahmed			
2012	Raaz 3D	"Kya Raaz Hai"	Jeet Ganguly	Kumaar	Shreya Ghoshal		
2012	Umang	"Akela Hoon Mein"	Jagdish Lalwani	Shadab Akhtar	Solo		
2012	Umang	"Akela Hoon Mein" (Remix)	Jagdish Lalwani	Shadab Akhtar	Solo		
2013	Mahabharat	"Kaal Kyon"	Rajendra Shiv	Asad Ajmeri	Solo	Animated	
2013	Krrish 3	"Dil Tu Hi Bataa"	Rajesh Roshan	Sameer	Alisha Chinai		
2013	Krrish 3	"Dil Tu Hi Bataa" (Remix)	Rajesh Roshan	Sameer	Alisha Chinai		
2013	Bloody Isshq	"Kill Me"	Ashok Bhadra	Kumaar	Usha Uthup		
2014	Mumbai 125 KM 3D	"Tere Bina"	Mani Sharma	Harshit Tomar	Solo		
2015	Hamari Adhuri Kahani	"Yeh Kaisi Jagah"	Jeet Gannguli	Rashmi Virag	Deepali Sathe		
2015	Chinar Daastaan-E-Ishq	"Alvida"	Salim Sen, Siddique Sen	Jamil Ahmed	Solo		
2015	Meeruthiya Gangsters	"Title Song"	Vivek Kar	Kumaar	Dev Negi		
2015	One Last Question	"Chalte Chalte"	Anurag Saikia	Rohit Nikam	Solo		
2016	Dil Toh Deewana Hai	"Dil Toh Deewana Hai (Title Track)"	Zubeen Garg, Anand Raj Anand	Kumar Vishwas	Solo		
2016	Dil Toh Deewana Hai	"Dhoop Khile Jab Tum Muskarao"	Zubeen Garg, Anand Raj Anand	Kumar Vishwas	Solo		
2016	Ishq Forever	"Farog Zindagi Hai"	Amit Shard trivedi	Nadeem Ahmed			https://www.youtube.com/watch?v=cNBvBkVd6ks&list=RDcNBvBkVd6ks&start_radio=1
2017	Galti Sirf Tumhari	"Tera Chehara"	Sahil Rayyan	Salim Ashfee	Salim Ashfee		Solo
2017	Gangs Of North East	"Dhire Dhire"	Zubeen Garg	Benjamin			Solo
2017	Mission China	"Naino Se Nikalte"	Zubeen Garg	Sumit Acharjya	Tori		
2017	Love You Family	"Tune Chhua – Baras Jaa"	Naresh Karwala	Naresh Karwala	Megna Yagnik		
2021	Murder At Teesri Manzil 302	"Ishq Nayo Karna"	Sajid-Wajid	Jalees Sherwani	Solo		
2022	Shadow Assassins	"Kabhi Dhoop Kabhi Chaon"	Ashu Chakraborty	Raajhorshee De	Solo		
2024	Woh Bhi Din The	"Roothoon"	Joi Barua	Irshad Kamil	Monali Thakur		

Year	Name	Director(s)	Song	Composer	Writers(s)	Co-Singer(s)	Ref.
2015		Prathamesh Krisang	"Chalte Chalte"		Rohit Nikam	Solo	

=== Hindi Web Series songs ===
Webseries	Year	Song	Composer(s)	Writer(s)	Co-singer(s)	Ref.
TVF Tripling:(Season 2)	2019	"Tu Kahaan Hai"	Nilotpal Bora	Hussain Haidry	Solo	

=== Hindi album songs ===
Year	Album	Song	Composer(s)	Writer(s)	Co-singer(s)	Notes	Ref.
Indipop album songs
1995	Chandni Raat	"Chandni Raat Hai Sanam"	Zubeen Garg	Zubeen Garg	Solo	Hindi version of "Hahaile Tumi".	
1995	Chandni Raat	"Asha Meri Asha"	Zubeen Garg	Zubeen Garg	Solo	Hindi Version of "Asha Mur Asha".	
1995	Chandni Raat	"Maya Kaisi Hai Yeh Maya"	Zubeen Garg	Zubeen Garg	Solo	Hindi version of "Maya Mathu Maya".	
1995	Chandni Raat	"Akhiyan Hain Ya Koi"	Zubeen Garg	Zubeen Garg	Solo		
1995	Chandni Raat	"Come On Sweet Girl"	Zubeen Garg	Zubeen Garg	Solo	Hindi version of "Tumi Janane".	
1995	Chandni Raat	"Kaise Kahon Kab Se Mein"	Zubeen Garg	Zubeen Garg	Kavita Krishnamurthy		
1995	Chandni Raat	"Mehbooba O Mehbooba"	Zubeen Garg	Zubeen Garg	Solo		
1995	Chandni Raat	"Anjana O Neelanjana"	Zubeen Garg	Zubeen Garg	Kavita Krishnamurthy		
1996	Chanda	"Chanda"	Zubeen Garg	Zubeen Garg	Jonkey Borthakur		
1996	Chanda	"Pyar Se"	Zubeen Garg	Zubeen Garg	Jonkey Borthakur		
1996	Chanda	"Kal Ko"	Zubeen Garg	Zubeen Garg	Solo		
1996	Chanda	"Jeevan Hai"	Zubeen Garg	Zubeen Garg	Solo		
1996	Chanda	"Geet Gane"	Zubeen Garg	Zubeen Garg	Solo		
1996	Chanda	"Ye Sach Hai"	Zubeen Garg	Zubeen Garg	Solo		
1996	Chanda	"Jeena"	Zubeen Garg	Zubeen Garg	Solo		
1996	Chanda	"Door"	Zubeen Garg	Zubeen Garg	Solo	Hindi version of "Dur Duronire Mon Jonaki Mon".	
1998	Yuhi Kabhi	"Yuhi Kabhi"	Miko	Anant Joshi	Solo		
1998	Yuhi Kabhi	"Tum Aur Tumhara Khayal"	Miko	Miko	Solo		
1998	Yuhi Kabhi	"Kya Yeh Pyar Hein"	Miko	Miko	Solo		
1998	Yuhi Kabhi	"I Need Your Love Today"	Zubeen Garg	Sumeet Achariya	Solo	Hindi version of "Tumi Nidiya".	
2000	Sparsh	"Iss Duniya Ki Raahon Mein"	Zubeen Garg	Zubeen Garg	Solo		
2000	Sparsh	"Naam Apna"	Zubeen Garg	Zubeen Garg	Solo		
2000	Sparsh	"Sunoh Yeh Aasman"	Zubeen Garg	Zubeen Garg	Solo		
2000	Syndrome Of Love	"Yeh Leheren"	Saba	Saba	Padmini		
2000	Syndrome Of Love	"Kuch Lamhe"	Saba	Saba	Solo		
2007	Ustad Sultan Khan & Friends	"Chand Taare"	Suhel Rais Khan				
2007	Rasiya Saajan	"Rasiya Saajan"	Ismail Darbar		Solo		
2007	Rasiya Saajan	"Ranaiya"	Ismail Darbar		Solo		
2007	Rasiya Saajan	"Rasiya Saajan (Dance Mix)"	Ismail Darbar		Solo		
2007	Indian Brothers	"Maula"	Hanif Shaikh		Solo		
2007	Zindagi	"Jia Lage Na"	Alaap Dudul		Solo		
2007	Zindagi	"Jia Re Jia"	Alaap Dudul		Solo		
2007	Zindagi	"Nazaren Karam Ho"	Alaap Dudul		Solo		
2007	Zindagi	"Pal Pal Bekal"	Alaap Dudul		Chithra		
2007	Zindagi	"Shaam Dhal Jaye"	Alaap Dudul		Chithra		
2007	Zindagi	"Tu Hi Tu Hai"	Alaap Dudul		Shafqat Amanat Ali		
2007	Zindagi	"Udte Parindon Ke"	Alaap Dudul		Solo		
2007	Zindagi	"Udte Parindon Ke (House Mix)"	Alaap Dudul		Solo		
2007	Zindagi	"Zindagi Kahin Gum Hai"	Alaap Dudul		Solo		
2007	Zindagi	"Zindagi Kahin Gum Hai (Remix)"	Alaap Dudul		Solo		
2008	Deewangi Bole Log	"Allah Allah Mere Maula"	Nayab Raja		Rubina		
2008	Deewangi Bole Log	"Tera Sayan Nahin"	Nayab Raja		Solo		
2008	Deewangi Bole Log	"Ishq Hua"	Nayab Raja		Solo		
2008	Deewangi Bole Log	"Qurbaan Meri Zindagi"	Nayab Raja		Solo		
2008	Aye! Hip Hopper – IshQ Bector	"My World- O June Junali"	Ishq Bector		Solo		
2008	Phir Aaya Bihu Jhum ke 1	"Dil Mein Tu Hai"			Sumedha		
2008	Phir Aaya Bihu Jhum ke 1	"Neend Uri Mera Chain"			Sumedha		
2009	Phir Aaya Bihu Jhum Ke 2	"Dil Diwana"			Solo		
2009	Phir Aaya Bihu Jhum Ke 2	"Dilruba"			Sumadha		
2009	Phir Aaya Bihu Jhum Ke 2	"Gori Jara"			Sumadha		
2009	Phir Aaya Bihu Jhum Ke 2	"Bihu – Alop Morom"			Jonki		
2009	Humm – Towards Nirvana	"Titliyon Jaisa Mann"	Kamlesh Shaamaniya		Solo		
2009	A.R. Rahman – Signature Collection (CD 3)	"Main Ramta Jogi"	A.R. Rahman		Tulsi Kumar		
2010	Azadi – Voice of the People (Sampler)	"Abhi Abhi"					
2010	Azadi – Voice of the People (Sampler)	"Azadi"					
2010	ARRK	"Sunle Rahi"			Solo		
2011	Teri Aankhein	"Ya Khuda"	Raaj Ashoo	Murli Agarwal	Solo		
2013	Pakeeza	"Pakeeza"	Zubeen Garg	Zubeen Garg	Solo	First album composed, sung, and written solely by him.	
2013	Pakeeza	"Piya"	Zubeen Garg	Zubeen Garg	Solo	First album composed, sung, and written solely by him.	
2013	Pakeeza	"Kehkasha"	Zubeen Garg	Zubeen Garg	Solo	First album composed, sung, and written solely by him.	
2013	Pakeeza	"Piya More"	Zubeen Garg	Zubeen Garg	Solo	First album composed, sung, and written solely by him.	
2013	Pakeeza	"Chalte Chalo Re"	Zubeen Garg	Zubeen Garg	Solo	First album composed, sung, and written solely by him.	
2013	Pakeeza	"Rama Rama"	Zubeen Garg	Zubeen Garg	Solo	First album composed, sung, and written solely by him.	
2013	Pakeeza	"I Can Live For You"	Zubeen Garg	Zubeen Garg	Solo	First album composed, sung, and written solely by him.	
2013	Pakeeza	"Kafur"	Zubeen Garg	Zubeen Garg	Solo	First album composed, sung, and written solely by him.	
2013	Bahon Mein	"Hai Badtameez"				Recorded the song in 2009.	
2013	Dil Ki Zubaan	"Karam Kar Aie Elahi"	Yasin Darbar				
2013	Dil Ki Zubaan	"Naina To Naina"	Yasin Darbar				
2013	Ishq Forever	"Farog Zindgi Main"	Amit Sharad Trivedi		Solo		
2013	Ishq Forever	"Mera Yaar Mila De Rabba"	Amit Sharad Trivedi		Solo		
2013	Ishq Forever	"Teri Talash"	Amit Sharad Trivedi		Solo		
2013	Ishq Forever	"Teri Talash (Remix)"	Amit Sharad Trivedi		Solo		
2017	Sufi Ishq	"Ishq Hua"	Nayab Raja		Solo		
2017	Sufi Ishq	"Allah Allah"	Nayab Raja		Shabina, Rubina		
2017	Sufi Ishq	"Qurban Meri Zindagi"	Nayab Raja		Solo		
2017	Sufi Ishq	"Tu Hi Tu"	Nayab Raja		Solo		
2017	Sufi Ishq	"Tu Meri Aashiqui"	Nayab Raja		Shabina		
Cover/Tribute Album Songs
1996	Shraddhanjali Vol-1	"Hume Tum Se Pyar"					
1996	Shraddhanjali Vol-1	"Roop Tera Mastana"					
1996	Shraddhanjali Vol-1	"Karvate Badalte"					
1996	Shraddhanjali Vol-1	"Dil Kya Kare"			Solo		
1996	Shraddhanjali Vol-1	"Pal Pal Dil Ke"					
1996	Shraddhanjali Vol-1	"Chandni Raat Mein"					
1996	Shraddhanjali Vol-1	"O Mere Dil Ke"					
1996	Shraddhanjali Vol-1	"Ghungroo"					
1996	Shraddhanjali Vol-1	"Kora Kagaz"					
1996	Shraddhanjali Vol-1	"O Majhi Re"					
1996	Shraddhanjali Vol-1	"Hum Dono"					
1996	Shraddhanjali Vol-1	"Chalte "Chalte"					
1997	Shraddanjali Vol-2	"Main Hoon"					
1997	Shraddanjali Vol-2	"Din Mahine"					
1997	Shraddanjali Vol-2	"O Sathi Re"			Anupama Deshpande		
1997	Shraddanjali Vol-2	"Kitne Khoob"					
1997	Shraddanjali Vol-2	"Chingaree"					
1997	Shraddanjali Vol-2	"Pardeshi"					
1997	Shraddanjali Vol-2	"Tujh Sang"					
1997	Shraddanjali Vol-2	"Gum Hai"					
1997	Shraddanjali Vol-2	"Mere Naina"					
1997	Shraddanjali Vol-2	"Yeh Jeevan"					
1997	Shraddanjali Vol-2	"Musafir Hoon"					
1997	Shraddanjali Vol-2	"Tere Bina"					
1997	Shraddanjali Vol-3	"Ankhon Mein Humne Aapke"					
1997	Shraddanjali Vol-3	"Meet Na Mila"			Saswati		
1997	Shraddanjali Vol-3	"Gore Rang Pe Na"					
1997	Shraddanjali Vol-3	"Aakhon Mein Kajal Hai"					
1997	Shraddanjali Vol-3	"Phoolon Ka Taaron Ka"					
2000	Bhoomi	"Xuno Xuno Re Xuro" (Assamese song)	Sankardev	Sankardev	Solo		
2002	Mur Sapunare Katha	"Hindustan Hindustan"	Jyoti Prasad Agarwala	Jyoti Prasad Agarwala	Solo		
2003	Desh	"Bande Shubhu"			Ranju, Basanta, Shibani Kashyap, Bandana, Amrina		
2006	Bollywood Unplugged	"Lakhoon Hain Nighan Mein (Unplugged)"			Solo		
2006	Bollywood Unplugged	"Ruk Jaana Nahin (Unplugged)"			Solo		
Remix Album Songs
1998	Jalwa	"Hum Kisi Se Kam Nahin (Tribal Medley Mix)"					
1999	Jadoo	"Saara Zamana (Savage lovers mix)"			Solo		
1999	Jadoo	"Ek Ladki Ko Dekha" (Plugs out mix)"			Solo		
1999	Jadoo	"The Jadoo Medley"			Kunal Ganjawala		
2000	Jalwa 2	"Raat Baaki (A Mood For Love)"					
2000	Jalwa 2	"Dil Lena Khel Hai (Play It Again Baby)"					
2001	Desivoice.com	"Shola Jo Bhadke"			Padmini Iyer		
2001	Desivoice.com	"Chingadi Koi Bhadke			Solo		
2001	Desivoice.com	"Yeh Ladka Hai Allah"			Mahalakshmi Iyer		
2001	Desivoice.com	"Rote Hue"			Solo		
2001	Desivoice.com	"Yeh Jo Mohabbat Hai"			Solo		
2001	Smash Hits (Vol 1)						
2001	Dance Dhamaka (Vol 1)	"Roop Tera Mastana"			Solo	Reused from "Shraddhanjali Vol 1".	
2002	Dance Masti Again	"Gum Hai Kisi Ke Pyar Mein - The 'Lost Inside Your Love' Mix"	R. D. Burman (Remix by Instant Karma)		Mahalakshmi Iyer, Caralisa Monteiro		
2002	Dance Masti Again	"Pardesia - The 'Euro' Mix"	Rajesh Roshan (Remix by Instant Karma)		Mahalakshmi Iyer		
2003	Aur Ek Haseena Thi	"Chadhti Jawaani"			Shaswati Phukan		
2003	Jaa Re Jaa	"Pal Pal Dil Ke Paas"			Solo		
2003	Jaa Re Jaa	"Zindagi Ka Safar"			Solo		
2003	Jaa Re Jaa	"Ek Haseena Thi"			Solo		
2004	AK-47 & other hits	"Jhooth Bole Kauwa Kante"			Shashwati		
2004	Yeh Parda Hata Do	"Yeh Teri Aankhen Jhuki Jhuki - Remix"			Solo		
2004	Yeh Parda Hata Do	"Naino Mein Sapna - Remix"			Deepali Joshi		
2005	Power Play Version 1.0	"Ishq Mera Bandagi"	(Remix by DJ Aqeel)		Solo		
2005	Dance Attack	"Bachna Ae Hasinon"					
2005	Dance Attack	"Janu Meri Jaan"					
2005	Dance Attack	"Lekar Hum Deewana Dil"			Pamela Jain		
2006	Dance Masti Forever	"Raat Kali - The 'Midnight Lady' Mix"	R. D. Burman (Remix by Instant Karma)		Pervez Quadir, Caralisa Monteiro		
2006	Dance Masti Forever	"Mere Dil Mein Aaj Kya Hai - The 'Amorous Lover' Mix"	Laxmikant-Pyarelal (Remix by Instant Karma)		Solo		
2006	Sanober & The Masti Express	"Dil Nahi Lagda"			Sanober		
2006	Sanober & The Masti Express	"Chadhti Jawaani" (Aur Ek Haseena Thi-2003)			Shaswati Phukan		
2007	Audiograph	"Madhoshiyan"	DJ Vkey		Rupjyoti		
2008	Jalwa Returns	"Om Shanti Om"	(Remix by DJ Akbar Sami)		Solo		

=== Hindi Singles ===
Year	Song	Composer(s)	Writer(s)	Co-singer(s)	Ref.
2017	"Tere Bina"	Nanda Banerjee	Chitra Dudhoria	Solo	
2017	"Chalte Chalte"	Nanda Banerjee	Chitra Dudhoria	Solo	
2018	"Rang De Chunariya"	Tabun	Meerabai	Solo	
2019	"Ek Nazar"	Abhinov borah	Rita Rai	Angel Rai	
2019	"Sajna"	Angel Borthakur	Angel Borthakur, Abhinav Majumdar	Solo	
2019	"Aane Wala Pal"	Abhinov Borah	Rita Rai	Angel Rai	
2019	"Ranjhana"	Abhinov Borah	Rita Rai	Angel Rai	
2020	"Vande Mataram"	Jadunath Bhattacharya (Recreated by Shekharjyoti Goswami)	Bankim Chandra Chatterjee	Solo	
2021	"Aye Khuda"	Arbind / Lyton	Moied Elhaam	Angel Rai	
2021	"Kangan"	Angel Borthakur	Abhinav Majumdar, Angel Borthakur	Ritrisha Sharma	
2022	"Aya Eid Ka Din"	Ritu Zeid	Bilkis Inam, Babul	Bilkis Inam	
2022	"Yeh Dil"	Priyanku Bordoloi	Anupam Nath	Nitumoni Kalita	
2025	"Bajti Guitar Pe Raatain"	Pulak Das	Chitra Dudhoria	Solo	
2025	"Beetein Saare Pal"	Bishwajeet Chauhan	Bishwajeet Chauhan	Solo	

=== Hindi replaced songs ===
Year	Film	Song	Replaced By	Composer(s)	Co-singer	Ref.
1998	Doli Saja Ke Rakhna	"Taram Pum"	Babul Supriyo	A. R. Rahman	Srinivas	
1999	Taal	"Nahin Samne Tu"	Hariharan	A. R. Rahman	Sukhwinder Singh	
2006	Gangster	"Tu Hi Meri Shab Hai"	KK	Pritam		
2006	Woh Lamhe	"Kya Mujhe Pyar Hai"	KK	Pritam		
2013	Yeh Jawaani Hai Deewani	"Ilahi"	Arijt Singh			https://www.instagram.com/p/DRyX082kpsC/
2016	Raaz: Reboot	"Lo Maan Liya"	Arijit Singh	Jeet Gannguli		
2016	Kaabil	"Kaabil Hoon - Title Track"	Jubin Nautiyal	Rajesh Roshan		
2019	Milan Talkies	"Shart"	Sonu Nigam	Rana Mazumder		

== Bengali Songs ==
=== Bengali film songs ===
Year	Movie	Song	Composer(s)	Writer(s)	Co- singer(s)	Ref.
2003	Mon (Dubbed)	"Mon Pakhi Hoye"	Manash Hazarika & Dilip Nath	Goutam Kumar Chakraborty	Queen Hazarika	
2003	Mon (Dubbed)	"O Mon Bolaka"	Manash Hazarika & Dilip Nath	Goutam Kumar Chakraborty	Solo	
2004	Shudhu Tumi	"Ektuku Chhoan Lage"	Zubeen Garg	Sumit Acharya	Solo	
2004	Shudhu Tumi	"Bheja Bheja Smritir Pathor"	Zubeen Garg	Sumit Acharya	Solo	
2004	Shudhu Tumi	"Piriti Kathaler Agatha"	Zubeen Garg	Sumit Acharya	Pritha Mazumdar	
2004	Premi	"O Bondhu Re (Tor Khushi Te)"	Jeet Gannguli	Gautam Susmit	Solo	
2008	Golmaal	"Akashe Batashe"	Ashok Bhadra		Solo	
2008	Chirodini Tumi Je Amar	"Piya Re Piya Re"	Jeet Gannguli	Priyo Chattopadhyay	Solo	
2008	Hello Kolkata	"Alo Ar Adharer"	Abhijeet Bose		Solo	
2008	Love Story	"Mon Jete Chay"	Jolly Mukherjee	Saran Dutta	Janiva Roy	
2008	Mon Mane Na	"Mon Mane Na"	Jeet Gannguli	Priyo Chattopadhyay	June Banerjee	
2008	Mon Mane Na	"Subho Mangalam"	Jeet Gannguli	Priyo Chattopadhyay	Solo	
2009	Paran Jai Jaliya Re	Aami Tomari Thakbo	Jeet Gannguli	Priyo Chattopadhyay		
2009	Chaowa Pawa	"Bondhu Aaj Theke"	Ashok Bhadra		Abhijeet Bhattacharya	
2009	Friend	"Tomar Chobi"	Akassh			
2009	Friend	"Tomay Bhebey"	Akassh			
2009	Friend	"Deshi Murgi"	Akassh			
2009	Prem Aamar	"Bojhena Se Bojhena"	Jeet Gannguli	Gautam Sushmit	Solo	
2009	Krodh	"Bhule Thaka Chilo Bhalo"	Babul Bose		Solo	
2009	Keno Kichhu Kotha Bolo Na	"Dooba Dooba"	Jeet Gannguli		Pamela Jain	
2009	Keno Kichhu Kotha Bolo Na	"Maula Re Maula"	Jeet Gannguli		Solo	
2009	Dujone	"Kar Chokhe"	Jeet Gannguli		Monali Thakur	
2009	Dujone	"Badhua"	Jeet Gannguli		Monali Thakur	
2009	Dujone	"Badhua (Sad)"	Jeet Gannguli		Solo	
2009	Bolo Na Tumi Aamar	"Bolo Na Tumi Aamar" (Reprise)	Jeet Gannguli	Gautam Sushmit	Monali Thakur	
2009	Bolo Na Tumi Aamar	"Aaina Mon Bhanga"	Jeet Gannguli	Priyo Chattopadhyay	Solo	
2009	Amar Sangee	"Je Premete"	Babul Bose	Goutam Susmit	Solo	
2010	Mon Je Kore Uru Uru	"Na Jene Mon"	Jeet Gannguli		Solo	
2010	Mon Je Kore Uru Uru	"Tor Pirite"	Jeet Gannguli		Solo	
2010	Love Circus	"Love Circus"	Ashok Bhadra			
2010	Mon Niye	"Mon Niye"	Zubeen Garg			
2010	Mon Niye	"Ki Je Holo"	Zubeen Garg			
2010	Mon Niye	"Chena Chena"	Zubeen Garg		Anindita Paul	
2010	Mon Niye	"Jonaki Mon"	Zubeen Garg	Diganta Bharati	Anindita Paul, Soham Chakraborty	
2010	Mon Aamar Shudhu Tomar	"Bho Katta"	Shubhayu		Solo	
2010	Mon Aamar Shudhu Tomar	"Janina Ami Kichu"	Shubhayu			
2010	Mon Aamar Shudhu Tomar	"Lage Na Lage Na Mon"	Shubhayu			
2010	Kachhe Achho Tumi	"Chokhe Chokhe"	Zubeen Garg		Anindita Paul	
2010	Kachhe Achho Tumi	"Ei Rangeen"	Zubeen Garg		June Banerjee	
2010	Kachhe Achho Tumi	"Chupi Chupi"	Zubeen Garg		Shaan, Zublee	
2010	Kachhe Achho Tumi	"Kachhe Acho Tumi"	Zubeen Garg		Solo	
2010	Kachhe Achho Tumi	"Prem Agune"	Zubeen Garg		Shaan, June Barerjee	
2010	Kachhe Achho Tumi	"Keno Je"	Zubeen Garg		Kumar Sanu	
2010	Kachhe Achho Tumi	"Kachhe Achho-Remix"	Zubeen Garg		Solo	
2010	Jor Jar Muluk Tar	"Bondhu Tin Din"	Ashok Raaj		Solo	
2010	Hangover	"Made in India"	Bappi Lahiri		Sunidhi Chauhan	
2011	100% Love	"Ek Mutho Swapno (Sad)"	Jeet Gannguli		Solo	
2011	Khokababu	"Tore Niye Jai"	Rishi Chanda	Gautam Sushmit	Mahalakshmi Iyer	
2011	Khokababu	"Soniye Tu Janiye Tu"	Rishi Chanda	Gautam Sushmit	June Banerjee	
2011	Baaz	"Du Chokhe"	Debojit		Solo	
2011	Bhalo Meye Mondo Meye	"Bhalobasha"	Ashok Bhadra		Solo	
2011	Best Friend	"Bhool Bojhatai Ei Jiboner"	Ashok Bhadra		Solo	
2011	Paglu	"Prem Ki Bujhini"	Jeet Gannguli	Prasenjit Mukherjee	Akriti Kakkar	
2011	Ogo Bideshini	"Du Chokher Oi Neel Aakashe"	Ashok Bhadra		Solo	
2011	Love Me	"Firbena Firbena Ei Mon"			Solo	
2011	Superstar – A Love Story	"Keu Jane Na"	Ashok Raaj		Anweshaa	
2011	Unish Kurir Galpo	"Swapno Bhanga"	Arup Pranay		Solo	
2011	Romeo	"Mon Toke Dilam"	Jeet Gannguli	Priyo Chattopadhyay	Solo	
2011	Piya Tumi	"Mahiya (Male)"	Ashok Bhadra		Solo	
2011	Piya Tumi	"Mahiya Keno Mon"	Ashok Bhadra		Nirupama Roy	
2012	Tor Naam	"O Bondhu Re"	Akaash		Solo	
2012	Tor Naam	"Hare Hare Rama"	Mickey J. Meyer		Neelakshi	
2012	Idiot	"Pagli Toke Rakhbo"	Shree Pritam		Akriti Kakkar	
2012	Idiot	"Jhor Othe Mone"	Shree Pritam		Mahalakshmi Iyer	
2012	Idiot	"Hori Din To Gelo"	Shree Pritam		Solo	
2012	Idiot	"Heavy Lagchhe"	Shree Pritam		Solo	
2012	Paglu 2	"Khuda Jaane"	Jeet Gannguli	Prasen	Shreya Ghoshal, Shyam Bhatt	
2012	Paglu 2	"Habudubu Habudubu"	Jeet Gannguli	Prasen	Akriti Kakkar	
2012	Phire Esho Tumi	"Kichu Chupi Chupi Kotha"	Ashok Bhadra		June Banerjee	
2012	Phire Esho Tumi	"Kichhu Kichhu Kotha"	Ashok Bhadra		Solo	
2012	Jaaneman	"Tomar Amar Prem"	Jeet Gannguli	Priyo Chattopadhyay	Solo	
2013	Majnu	"Lonely Very Lonely"	Savvy Gupta	Prasen	Solo	
2013	Rangbaaz	"Love You Soniyo"	Jeet Gannguli	Prasen	Monali Thakur	
2013	Khiladi	"Pagol Ami Already"	Shree Pritam	Shree Pritam	Mahalakshmi Iyer	
2013	Khiladi	"Ki Diya Banaise"	Shree Pritam	Shree Pritam	Solo	
2013	Khoka 420	"Bin Tere Tere Bin"	Shree Pritam	Smarajit Bandyopadhyay	Solo	
2013	Latto	"Bhabnaar Tuli Diye"	Bappi Lahiri		Solo	
2013	Kanamachi	"Dil Dorodiay"	Rishi Chanda	Prasen	June Banerjee	
2013	Deewana	"De Signal"	Dev Sen	Prasenjit Mallick	June Banerjee, Dev Sen	
2013	Megh Roddur	"Aaj Abar Ami Eka"	Rishi Chanda		Solo	
2013	Nishwartha Bhalobasa	"Dhakar Pola"	Akassh	Akassh	Solo	
2013	Nishwartha Bhalobasa	"Dhakar Pola" (Remix Version)	Akassh	Akassh	Solo	
2013	Ak Tukro Tara	"Kande Re"	Akassh	Debangshu	Solo	
2014	Action	"Main Aashiq Hoon"	Akassh	Priyo Chattopadhyay	Solo	
2014	Bindaas	"Ajke Ei Khushir Dine"	Devi Sri Prasad	Priyo Chattopadhay	Solo	
2014	Mangrove	"Majhi Re Majhi Re"	Barun & Subrata		Solo	
2014	Rater Rajanigandha	"Jibon Re"	Devjit Roy		Solo	
2014	Chirodini Tumi Je Amar 2	"Maula"	Jeet Gannguli		Solo	
2014	Taan	"Dure Kache Aar Kache Dure"	Indradeep Dasgupta		Solo	
2014	Taan	"Fagun" (Male)	Indradeep Dasgupta		Solo	
2014	Sare Chuattar Ghoshpara	"Bara Bare Ar Asa Hobena"	Ashok Bhadra		Solo	
2014	Sare Chuattar Ghoshpara	"Chol Jai Tor Hath Dhore"	Ashok Bhadra		June Banerjee	
2015	Romeo vs Juliet	"Saiyaan"	Savvy	Prasen	Akriti Kakkar	
2015	Miss Butterfly	"Sathiyaa"	Shree Pritam		Sirshaa Rakshit	
2015	Miss Butterfly	"Legeche Agun"	Shree Pritam		Poornima Shrestha	
2015	Grohon	"O Priya"			Sreeja Sengupta	
2015	Gurukripa	"E Kemon Prithibi"	Ashok Bhadra		Solo	
2015	Fakebook	"Mon"	Dolaan Mainnakk		Solo	
2016	Don No 1	"Tor Thonte Lovely Smile"	Ashok Bhadra		June Banerjee	
2016	Prem Ki Bujhini	"Rang Dilo"	Savvy	Soumyadeb	Solo	
2016	Sesh Sangbad	"Mahi Ve"	Amit Sur		Solo	
2016	Tui Je Amar	"Ektu Chowate"	Ashok Bhadra		Anwesha Datta Gupta	
2016	Tui Je Amar	"Swapno Sotti Holo"	Ashok Bhadra		Mahalakshmi Iyer	
2017	Premi O Premi	"Onek Kotha Chilo"	Akassh	Robiul Islam Jibon	Solo	
2017	Golir Messi	"E Parate Ekta Messi"	Manas Kd. Madhyam	Ran Samiran	Solo	
2017	Golir Messi	"Ebuker Agoone"	Manas Kd. Madhyam	Ran Samiran	Solo	
2017	Golir Messi	"Ekta Bhul Kije Jantrana"	Manas Kd. Madhyam	Ran Samiran	Solo	
2018	Tobuo Basanta	"Chena Chena Pather Kuasa Soriye"	Soumitra Chattopadhyay (Ramji)	Priyo Chattopadhyay	Solo	
2018	Tui Sudhu Amar	"Shanai Er Sur"	Dolaan Mainnakk		Mahalakshmi Iyer	
2018	Wrong Route	"Bony Bony Bony"	Dev Sen		Vicky A Khan, Dev Sen	
2018	Ami Toke Valobasi	"Ami Valo Nei"	Kundan Saha		Solo	
2019	The Nagarik	"Samayer Kotha Ar"	Debanshu Chakraborty		Moumita Ghosh	
2019	Samsara	"Shomoy Er Mayajal"	Zubeen Garg	Sumit Acharya	Bornali Kalita	
2019	O Bandhu Amar	"O Bandhu Amar (Title Track)"	Joy - Anjan	Bethun Bera	Solo	
2021	Kisalay	"Bhalo Thake Mon"	Amit Mitra	Sannoy Mitra	Indrani Banerjee	
2022	Reality Show	"Ichhe Manei Toh Swapno Dekha"	Ashok Bhadra		Solo	
2026	Shey Toh Aajo Bojhena	"Eto Alo Thekeo Andhakar"	Jeet Ganguli	Prasen	Solo	https://www.youtube.com/watch?v=duiQvVgMg8A

=== Bengali album songs ===
Year	Album	Song	Composer(s)	Writer(s)	Co- singer(s)	Notes	Ref.
1997	Surer Upahar	"Ken Je Tumi"	Sudeep-Sumit	Sumeet Acharya	Mousumi Sahariya	Debut Bengali album	
1997	Surer Upahar	"Je Kothati"	Sudeep-Sumit	Sumeet Acharya	Mousumi Sahariya	Debut Bengali album	
1997	Surer Upahar	"Ek Din Nibire"	Sudeep-Sumit	Sumeet Acharya	Mousumi Sahariya	Debut Bengali album	
1997	Surer Upahar	"Aaji Mon Shute"	Sudeep-Sumit	Sumeet Acharya	Mousumi Sahariya	Debut Bengali album	
1997	Surer Upahar	"Ronge Howa Swapno"	Sudeep-Sumit	Sumeet Acharya	Mousumi Alifa	Debut Bengali album	
1997	Surer Upahar	"O Amar Nilanjana"	Sudeep-Sumit	Sumeet Acharya	Mousumi Sahariya	Debut Bengali album	
1997	Surer Upahar	"Tomar Premre Poresi"	Sudeep-Sumit	Sumeet Acharya	Mousumi Alifa, Mousumi Sahariya	Debut Bengali album	
1997	Surer Upahar	"Romeo Bole Majno"	Sudeep-Sumit	Sumeet Acharya	Mousumi Sahariya	Debut Bengali album	
1999		"Jhiri Jhiri Ei Borosha"	Unknown	Unknown	Sagarika	Although these songs were initially recorded in 1999, originally as part of Zubeen's second Bengali album, they were never made available to the public. This was his only Bengali album featuring Sagarika, where they performed only duet song titled "Jhiri Jhiri Ei Borosha", and it stands as one of the few Zubeen songs that went unreleased. Subsequently, it has occasionally appeared in bootleg or demo tapes.	
1999		"Maas Kinte Jamu"	Unknown	Unknown	Solo	Although these songs were initially recorded in 1999, originally as part of Zubeen's second Bengali album, they were never made available to the public. This was his only Bengali album featuring Sagarika, where they performed only duet song titled "Jhiri Jhiri Ei Borosha", and it stands as one of the few Zubeen songs that went unreleased. Subsequently, it has occasionally appeared in bootleg or demo tapes.	
1999		"Chanderi Josona"	Unknown	Unknown	Solo	Although these songs were initially recorded in 1999, originally as part of Zubeen's second Bengali album, they were never made available to the public. This was his only Bengali album featuring Sagarika, where they performed only duet song titled "Jhiri Jhiri Ei Borosha", and it stands as one of the few Zubeen songs that went unreleased. Subsequently, it has occasionally appeared in bootleg or demo tapes.	
2007	Tumi	"Aase Ki Na Aase"	Zubeen Garg	Sumit Acharya	Solo		
2007	Tumi	"Mayabini"	Zubeen Garg	Sumit Acharya	Kalpana		
2007	Tumi	"Pakhi"	Zubeen Garg	Sumit Acharya	Solo		
2007	Tumi	"Naar Neiya Re"	Zubeen Garg	Sumit Acharya	Solo		
2007	Tumi	"Tumi"	Zubeen Garg	Sumit Acharya	Solo		
2007	Tumi	"Maya"	Zubeen Garg	Sumit Acharya	Solo		
2007	Tumi	"Ke Sukhi Dharay"	Zubeen Garg	Sumit Acharya	Kalpana		
2007	Tumi	"Chokheri Tarate"	Zubeen Garg	Sumit Acharya	Kalpana		
2011	Prem	"Amar Gaaner Kothay"	Raju Saha		Solo		
2011	Prem	"Majhi Re"	Raju Saha		Solo		
2011	Prem	"Swapno Gulo"	Raju Saha		Manisha		
2011	Prem	"Akash Neele"	Raju Saha		Solo		
2011	Prem	"Tumi Keno Amake"	Raju Saha		Solo		
2011	Prem	"Bujhi Ni Ami"	Raju Saha		Solo		
2011	Prem	"Jare Jare Mon"	Raju Saha		Solo		
2012	More Priya	"More Priya"	Priyam Saha		Solo		
2012	More Priya	"Dil Dil"	Priyam Saha		Solo		
2012	More Priya	"Hiya Jole"	Priyam Saha		Solo		
2012	More Priya	"Ei Pagol Mon"	Priyam Saha		Solo		
2013	Bondhu Jodi	"Bondu Jodi (Title Track)"	Abhijit Bhattacharjee	Sumit Acharya	Solo		
2015	Bondhu Aamar	"Bondhu Aamar"	Samrat Bose	Barnali	Somchanda Bhattacharya		
2015	Bondhu Aamar	"Toke Chhara"	Samrat Bose	Barnali	Solo		
2016	Firbona Ar Bari (Bangladeshi Album)	"Firbona Bari (Title Track)"	Palash Choudhury	Palash Choudhury	Solo		
2016	O Kanye	"Konna Re Tui"	Ashok Bhadra	Ashok Bhadra	Chhanda, Gargi		
2019	Bristi	"Jham Jhama Jham"	Tapas Bhadury	Priyo Chattopadhyay	Solo		
2019	Bristi	"Mon Jaa Chay"	Tapas Bhadury	Priyo Chattopadhyay	Solo		
2021	Ehsaas	"Tor Jonye Swapno Dekhechi"	Lincon Roy Chowdhury		Solo		
2021	Aaj Baaja Tui Dhaak	"Aaj Baaja Tui Dhaak"	Bickram Ghosh	Sugata Guha	Amit Kumar, Hariharan, Shaan, Sona Mohapatra, Mahalakshmi Iyer, Kaushiki Chakraborty	His Last Bengali Pujo song recorded	

=== Bengali singles ===
Year	Song	Composer(s)	Writer(s)	Co-singer(s)	Ref.
2019	"O Mon"	NeeL		Solo	
2021	"O Baby"	Prasun Das	Riddhi Barua	Raisha	
2021	"Kurban"	Prasun Das	Riddhi Barua	Raisha	
2021	"Paroto Hath Bariye Dao"	Prasun Das	Prasen	Raisha	
2022	"Yarra Ve"	Lincon Roy Chowdhury		Solo	
2022	"Maa - Zubeen"	Juty Daimari	Kandarpa Roy	Solo	
2022	"Kolongko Tomar Naame"	Palash Chowdhury	Ondho Gopal Goshai	Solo	
2022	"Tumar Kothai Bole"	Purav Sinha	Muhammad Shahidur Rahman	Solo	
2023	"Bajlo Madol"	Bickram Ghosh	Sugato Guha	Various	
2023	"Tomari Achi"	Mandeep Kumar	Sahin Khan	Solo	

== Telugu songs ==
Year	Film	Song	Composer	Lyricist	Co-singer	Ref.
1996	Ninne Pelladata	(Score)	Sandeep Chowta		Solo	
1998	Premato	"Pokhi Pokhi Bidekhi"	A. R. Rahman		Solo	
2004	Club Mix	"Sannajaji Padaka"			Smita	
2007	Takkari	"Yele Yele"	Chakri	Kandikonda	Solo	
2008	Victory	"O Bachelor"	Chakri	Chandrabose	Sunidhi Chauhan	
2009	Maska	"Gunde Godarila"	Chakri	Kandikonda	Kousalya	

== Kannada songs ==
Year	Film	Song	Composer	Lyricist	Co-singer(s)	Ref.
2007	Hudugaata	"Ommomme Heego"	Jassie Gift	Kaviraj	Alisha Chinai	
2009	Parichaya	"Holihadu"	Jassie Gift	Jayanth Kaikini	H.G.Chaitra, Jassie Gift	
2022	Maha Roudram	"Amma Neene Thane"	Aditya Aashish Singh		Aditya Aashish Singh	

== Tamil songs ==
Year	Film/Album	Song	Composer	Lyricist	Co-singer	Ref.
1998	Uyire	"Pokhi Pokhi Bidekhi"	A. R. Rahman		Solo	
2004	Kalakkal	"Inji iduppazhagi"	Ilaiyaraaja	Vaali	Smita	
2004	Kuthu	"Asaanaa Asaanaa"	Srikanth Deva	Snehan	Mahalakshmi Iyer	
2007	Urchagam	"Kangal Enkangalo"	Ranjit Barot	Kabilan	Solo	

== Sindhi songs ==
Year	Album	Song	Composer	Lyricist(s)	Co-singer	Ref.
2013	Sindhi Rocks	"Jiye Sindhi Jiye"	Nitin Gupta and Bhushan Gogad		Solo	

== Malayalam songs ==
Year	Film	Song	Composer(s)	Lyricist(s)	Co-singer(s)	Ref.
1998	Uyire	"Pokhi Pokhi Bidekhi"	A. R. Rahman		Solo	

== Odia songs ==
Year	Film/Album	Song	Composer	Lyricist	Co-singer	Ref.
	Angna	"Moli Fulow Kaharo"	Sajan Nayak		Solo	
2022						

== Punjabi songs ==
Year	Film/Album	Song	Composer(s)	Lyricist(s)	Co-singer(s)	Ref.

== Bhojpuri Songs ==
Year	Film/Album	Song	Composer	Lyricist	Co-singer	Ref.
2008		"Jabse Sayan Bhailu"	Zubeen Garg		Solo	
2008	Sab Gol Maal Ha (film)	"Ho Jekara Ke Dil Chahe"	Nikhil	Phanindar Rav	Priya Bhattacharya	

== Marathi songs ==
Year	Film/Album	Song	Composer(s)	Lyricist(s)	Co-singer(s)	Ref.
2004	Yeh Parda Hata Do	"Aushi Cha Gho"	Paresh N Shah		Shashwati Phukan	

== Bodo songs ==
Year	Film/Album	Song	Composer	Lyricist	Co-singer(s)	Ref.
2004	Chiri Chiri Mwthw Mwthw	"Chiri Chiri Mwthw Mwthw"	Mushukha		Solo	
2004	Chiri Chiri Mwthw Mwthw	"Monalisha"	Kanu & Prabhu		Sulekha Basumatary	
2005	Chiri Chiri Sikhaway	"Onnai Ang"	Laney		Solo	
2005	Chiri Chiri Sikhaway	"Barfunai"	Laney		Solo	
2007	Siri Siri Laswe Laswe	"Siri Siri Laswe Laswe"	Zubeen Garg	Phylaw Basumatory	Solo	
2007	Siri Siri Laswe Laswe	"Rail Dabakhen"	Zubeen Garg	Phylaw Basumatory	Solo	
2007	Siri Siri Laswe Laswe	"Bara Khwlw Khwlw"	Zubeen Garg	Phylaw Basumatory	Solo	
2007	Siri Siri Laswe Laswe	"Nong Aang"	Zubeen Garg	Phylaw Basumatory	Solo	
2007	Chonathi Rufathi	"Jaharu Sorni Surmai Rijhamai"			Solo	
2007	Chonathi Rufathi	"O Chana No Aani Julia"			Solo	
2007	Chonathi Rufathi	"Diwana Anjli Chana"			Solo	
2007	Chonathi Rufathi	"Ani Maithayau Gajnaindanblau"			Solo	
2007	Chonathi Rufathi	"Chana Habbai Poroje"			Solo	
2007	Chonathi Rufathi	"Kham Jotha Gom Khanbai"			Solo	
2007	Chonathi Rufathi	"Aayo Monmaarbai"			Solo	
2007	Chonathi Rufathi	"Mini Naai Megan Jora"			Solo	
2007	Chonathi Rufathi	"Chonathi Rufathi"			Solo	
2010	Khalao Khasao	"Khalao Khasao"	Zubeen Garg		Solo	
2010	Khalao Khasao	"Dini Nwng Gwiyaba"	Zubeen Garg			
2010	Khalao Khasao	"Khamgli Khamgli"	Zubeen Garg	Zubeen Garg		
2010	Khalao Khasao	" Be Maya Songsar"	Zubeen Garg		Solo	
2010	Khalao Khasao	"Arwbao Da Naiswi Sona"	Zubeen Garg		Solo	
2010	Khalao Khasao	"Basai Onnay"	Zubeen Garg		Solo	
2010	Jaro Pungni Sanao	"Jaro Pungni Sanao"	Zubeen Garg	Zubeen Garg		
2010	Mijing	"Besaybagwbawni"	Prakash		Solo	
2016	Khwina	"Khwina Nwng Angni"			Gitashree Ramchiary	

== Karbi songs ==
Year	Album	Song	Composer	Music	Lyricist	Co-singer(s)	Ref.
1997	Manai	"Manai"	Zubeen Garg	Zubeen Garg	Joysing Rongpi	Solo	
1997	Manai	"Li Chetong Chot Pachu"		Zubeen Garg	Joysing Rongpi	Solo	
1997	Manai	"Joi Joi Penle"		Zubeen Garg		Pokhila Lekthepi	
1997	Kimo	"Piching Acharnam"	Joyram Tisso	Zubeen Garg	Longsing Teron	Solo	
1997	Kimo	"Monit Monit"		Zubeen Garg		Solo	

== Tiwa songs ==
Year	Film/Album	Song	Composer	Lyricist	Co-singer(s)	Ref.
2001	Khumjil Kuwori	"Khumjil Kuwori" (Title Track)		Dipen Madar Pator	Solo	
2001	Khumjil Kuwori	"Khumjil Kuwori (Duet)"		Dipen Madar Pator		

== Nepali songs ==
Year	Film/Album/Single	Song	Composer	Lyricist(s)	Co-singer	Ref.
	Pachhauri	"Makhmali			Solo	
	Pachhauri	"Farer Pari Pachhauri"			Solo	
2011	Jhajhalko (VCD film)	"Jhajhalko timro maya ko"	Manas Hazarika		Solo	
2011	Baduli (album)	"Siraima Sirbandi"	Arjun Kaushal		Solo	
	Saugat (album)	"Mere Nimto"	Dharmaraj Upadhyay	Dharmaraj Upadhyay	Solo	
	Meri Sannani (album)	"Hijo Aaja"	Dharmaraj Upadhyay	Dharmaraj Upadhyay	Solo	
	Sparsh (album)	"Chhodera Jadei Chheu"	Dharmaraj Upadhyay	Dharmaraj Upadhyay	Solo	
2017		"Manma Kura Khelaudai"	Bijoy Kattel	Guru Bhotia	Junu Rijal	
2018		"Nadi Badyo Hai"	Zubeen Garg	Krishna KC, Akhil Sharma	Anju Panta	

== Bishnupriya Manipuri songs ==
Year	Film/Album	Song	Composer(s)	Lyricist	Co-singer	Ref.
2013	Lakhan (film)	"Jibone Morone"	Parimal Sinha & Tarun Tonmoy	Parimal Sinha	Solo	
2013	Lakhan (film)	"Jibone Morone" (Duet)	Parimal Sinha & Tarun Tonmoy	Parimal Sinha	Bithi Sinha	
2018	Coffee Ela Baaro Yaari (album)	"Nirole Khaani"	Dilip Sinha	Padmaja Sinha	Doll Sinhaa	

== Adi songs ==
Year	Album	Song	Composer(s)	Lyricist(s)	Co-singer(s)	Ref.
		"Kapena Piaang Koisi"	Zubeen Garg		Solo	
		"Tena Polo Kardungku"	Zubeen Garg		Solo	

== Nyishi songs ==
Year	Album	Song	Composer(s)	Lyricist(s)	Co-singer(s)	Ref.
2005		"Tudi Yami"	zubeen Garg		Solo	

== Galo songs ==
Year	Album	Song	Composer(s)	Lyricist(s)	Co-singer(s)	Ref.
		"Yar na mana gamo goda"	Zubeen Garg		Solo	
2002		"Silo Mopin Aduku"	Zubeen Garg		Solo	

== As a composer ==
=== Assamese songs ===
Year	Album	Song	Singer(s)	Ref.
1992	Anamika	"Anamika"	Zubeen Garg	
1992	Anamika	"Pothe Pothe"	Kavita Krishnamurti	
1992	Anamika	"Hiya Dohe"	Zubeen Garg	
1992	Anamika	"Pritir Hubakhe"	Zubeen Garg	
1992	Anamika	"Monor Nijanot"	Zubeen Garg	
1992	Anamika	"Kio Janu Aji"	Zubeen Garg, Kavita Krishnamurti	
1992	Anamika	"Gaane Ki Aane"	Zubeen Garg	
1992	Anamika	"Huna Huna"	Zubeen Garg, Kavita Krishnamurti	
1992	Sapunor Sur	"Nibir Junaki Rati"	Zubeen Garg	
1992	Sapunor Sur	"Mousumi"	Zubeen Garg	
1992	Sapunor Sur	"Sopunore Pokhi"	Sabita Sharma and Zubeen Garg	
1992	Sapunor Sur	"Aajir Pora"	Koustav Shama and Zubeen Garg	
1992	Sapunor Sur	"Bihure Boliya Mon"	Swaswati Phukan and Zubeen Garg	
1992	Sapunor Sur	"Jetiya Torali Phule"	Koustav Shama and Zubeen Garg	
1992	Sapunor Sur	" Etiya Padulite Ase Roi Konoba"	Sabita Sarma and Zubeen Garg	
1992	Anuradha	"Mon Boi Jai "	Anuradha Paudwal and Zubeen Garg	
1992	Anuradha	"Jun Gola"	Utpal Sharma & Anuradha Paudwal and Zubeen Garg	
1992	Anuradha	"Jonome Jonome"	Utpal Sharma & Anuradha Paudwal and Zubeen Garg	
1992	Anuradha	"kune Jane"	Utpal Sharma	
1992	Anuradha	"Tumi Diya Morome"	Utpal Sharma & Anuradha Paudwal and Zubeen Garg	
1993	Rodali	"Janane Ajiu Tumak"	Kavita Krishnamurty	
1993	Rodali	"Rupahi Bijuli"	Kumar Sanu	
1993	Ritu	"Duroni Duroni"	Zubeen Garg	
1993	Ritu	"Tumi Jonaki Xubakh"	Zubeen Garg	
1993	Ritu	"Tumi Janu Pariba Xun"	Leena Bezbora and Zubeen Garg	
1993	Ritu	"Mone Mur Kiyo Aji"	Leena Bezbora and Zubeen Garg	
1993	Ritu	"Duru duru kopise "	Riba Das and zubeen Garg	
1993	Junaki Mon	"Dur Duronire"	Zubeen Garg	
1993	Junaki Mon	"Junaki Mon"	Zubeen Garg	
1993	Junaki Mon	"Sokulore Bhora"	Zubeen Garg	
1993	Junaki Mon	"Nisatiye Kinu"	Zubeen Garg	
1993	Mur Xuria Geet	"Achina Dekhote"	Zubeen Garg	
1993	Mur Xuria Geet	"Alakananda"	Zubeen Garg	
1993	Mur Xuria Geet	"Xomoyo Jen"		
1993	Mur Xuria Geet	"Jajabor Hoi"		
1993	Mur Xuria Geet	"Tumi Xuriya"		
1993	Mur Xuria Geet	"Nilm Akash"		
1994	Puberun	"Xopunor Kothabur"	Jayanta Nath, Bristi Dutta	
1994	Maya	"Maya Mathu Maya"	Zubeen Garg	
1994	Maya	"Niribili Godhuli"	Zubeen Garg, Kavita Krishnamurthy	
1994	Maya	"Ujagori Bukute"	Zubeen Garg, Kavita Krishnamurthy	
1994	Maya	"Dure Dure"	Zubeen Garg	
1994	Maya	"Jonak Gola"	Zubeen Garg	
1994	Maya	"Unmona"	Zubeen Garg	
1994	Maya	"Jonake Kane Kane"	Zubeen Garg	
1994	Maya	"Phulere Xojalu"	Kavita Krishnamurthy	
1995	Asha	"Asha Mur Asha"	Zubeen Garg	
1995	Asha	"Tumi Jodi Kuwa"	Zubeen Garg, Sabita Sharma	
1995	Asha	"Jolila Puria"	Zubeen Garg	
1995	Asha	"Mur Mon"	Zubeen Garg, Sabita Sharma	
1995	Asha	"Aami Jen"	Zubeen Garg, Sabita Sharma	
1995	Asha	"Abhimani Mon"	Zubeen Garg	
1995	Asha	"Tumi Janane"	Zubeen Garg	
1995	Zubeenor Gaan	"Endhar Hobo Nuwaru"	Zubeen Garg	
1995	Zubeenor Gaan	"Aetia Aase Mathu"	Zubeen Garg	
1995	Zubeenor Gaan	"Laahe Laahe Osinaki"	Zubeen Garg	
1995	Zubeenor Gaan	"Etiau Hkhaare Aasu"	Zubeen Garg	
1995	Zubeenor Gaan	"Tumi Nidiya"	Zubeen Garg	
1995	Zubeenor Gaan	"Umi Umi Jwole"	Mahalakshmi Iyer, Hema Sardesai, Zubeen Garg	
1995	Zubeenor Gaan	"Ujagori Nikhaar"	Mahalakshmi Iyer , Zubeen Garg	
1995	Zubeenor Gaan	"Aakilu Sobikhon"	Zubeen Garg	
1996	Rong	"Rong Tumi Hobane"	Zubeen Garg, Mahalakshmi Iyer	
1996	Rong	"Tumi Dur Otitor"	Zubeen Garg	
1996	Rong	"Etiya Kakhot"	Zubeen Garg	
1996	Rong	"Seujiya Mon"	Zubeen Garg	
1996	Rong	"Jon Beli"	Zubeen Garg	
1996	Rong	"Aji Tumi Nohole"	Zubeen Garg, Mahalakshmi Iyer	
1996	Rong	"Borokha Jetiya Naame"	Zubeen Garg	
1996	Rong	"Muro Je"	Zubeen Garg	
1997	Mukti	"Phool Phulok"	Zubeen Garg	
1997	Mukti	"Sokuwe Sokuwe"	Zubeen Garg, Jonkey Borthakur	
1997	Mukti	"Sunere Sojuwa"	Zubeen Garg	
1997	Mukti	"Meghor Boron"	Zubeen Garg	
1997	Mukti	"Obak Obak"	Zubeen Garg	
1997	Mukti	"Pratitu Prahar"	Zubeen Garg	
1997	Mukti	"Ujolai Rakhisu"	Zubeen Garg, Jonkey Borthakur	
1997	Mukti	"Mukti"	Zubeen Garg, Jonkey Borthakur	
1998	Snigdha Jonak	"Nasaba Sokule"	Zubeen Garg, Papon	
1998	Snigdha Jonak	"Ei Kinu Hoi Jai"	Udit Narayan	
1998	Snigdha Jonak	"Collegiya"	Udit Narayan	
1998	Snigdha Jonak	"Fagun Ahile"	Mahalakshmi Iyer	
1998	Hobdo	"Kokal Khamusiya"	Zubeen Garg, Mahalakshmi Iyer	
1998	Hobdo	"Etiya Junake"	Zubeen Garg, Mahalakshmi Iyer	
1998	Hobdo	"Kunuba Ringiyai"	Zubeen Garg	
1998	Hobdo	"Nokoba Nokoba"	Zubeen Garg	
1998	Hobdo	"Mon Herua"	Zubeen Garg	
1998	Hobdo	"Jogot Puhor Kori"	Zubeen Garg	
1998	Hobdo	"Roi Roi Binale"	Zubeen Garg	
1998	Hobdo	"Hobdo"	Zubeen Garg	
1998	Pansoi	"Door Duronire Mon Junaki Mon"	Zubeen Garg	
1998	Pansoi	"Nikhatiye Kinu Koi"	Zubeen Garg	
1999	Meghor Boron	"Jodihe Jun Tora"	Zubeen Garg, Mahalakshmi Iyer	
1999	Meghor Boron	"Tumi Suwa Jetiya"	Zubeen Garg	
1999	Meghor Boron	"Joli Utha"	Zubeen Garg	
1999	Meghor Boron	"Joluwa Hiya Mur"	Zubeen Garg	
1999	Meghor Boron	"Pahari Gabhoru"	Udit Narayan	
1999	Meghor Boron	"Agoli Kolapat"	Mahalakshmi Iyer	
1999	Meghor Boron	"Purnima Jun Tumi"	Zubeen Garg, Udit Narayan, Mahalakshmi Iyer, Sagarika	
1999	Meghor Boron	"Bukure Bhitorot"	Udit Narayan	
1999	Hunaru '99	"Joonma Mur Moromi"	Zubeen Garg, Santa Uzir	
1999	Pakhi	"Pakhi Pakhi"	Zubeen Garg	
1999	Pakhi	"Aahe Ba Nahe"	Zubeen Garg	
1999	Pakhi	"Tumi Dinor"	Zubeen Garg	
1999	Pakhi	"Pakhi Meli Diye"	Zubeen Garg	
1999	Pakhi	"Soku Mela"	Zubeen Garg	
1999	Pakhi	"Aanguli Katilu"	Zubeen Garg	
1999	Pakhi	"Dugalote Jen"	Zubeen Garg, Pranita	
1999	Pakhi	"Hikoli"	Zubeen Garg, Mandakini	
2000	Sapun	"Nilim Akash Tirbir"	Zubeen Garg	
2000	Sapun	"Kola Soku Juri"	Zubeen Garg	
2001	Panchoi	"Borokhunot Kotha"	Diganta Bharati	
2001	Panchoi	"Hun Rodor Ahe Ahe"	Diganta Bharati	
2001	Panchoi	"Hosa Morome"	Diganta Bharati, Barnali Das	
2001	Panchoi	"Fagunor Posuwa"	Barnali Das	
2001	Panchoi	"Phul Phula Botorote"	Barnali Das	
2001	Panchoi	"Dukhor Bahi"	Barnali Das	
2001	Panchoi	"Hemeka Ei"	Barnali Das	
2001	Panchoi	"Botahot Hunilu"	Barnali Das	
2002	Shishu	"Bhoba Kotha"	Zubeen Garg	
2002	Shishu	"Mughdo Hiya Mur"	Zubeen Garg and Jonkey Borthakur	
2002	Shishu	"Kaar Porokh"	Zubeen Garg	
2002	Shishu	"Nidiya Nidiya"	Zubeen Garg	
2002	Shishu	"Diya Ghurai Diya"	Zubeen Garg	
2002	Shishu	"Aaukhir Jun Mur"	Jonkey Borthakur	
2002	Shishu	"Shanti Diya"	Zubeen Garg	
2002	Shishu	"Kahi Bati"	Zubeen Garg, Suzanne D'Mello	
2002	Bihuwan	"Bare Kisim Bhabonai"	Zubeen Garg	
2002	Sandhya	"Nital Nixar Aji"	Zubeen Garg	
2003	Sinaki Mon	"Bhal Pau Ne"	Zubeen Garg	
2004	Lajuki Mon	"Dhiniki Dhin Dau"	Zubeen Garg	
2004	Jantra	"Maina Maina"	Zubeen Garg	
2004	Jantra	"Jantra"	Zubeen Garg	
2004	Jantra	"Aei Maya Dhorat"	Zubeen Garg	
2004	Jantra	"Nejanu Mon Dole"	Zubeen Garg	
2004	Jantra	"Aalop Hanti Diya"	Zubeen Garg	
2004	Jantra	"I Love You"	Zubeen Garg	
2004	Jantra	"Tumar Mitha Ei Sawoni"	Zubeen Garg	
2004	Jantra	"Majuli Eijoni"	Zubeen Garg	
2004	Jantra	"O Mur Aponar Desh"	Zubeen Garg	
2006	Borokhun	"Kor Ejak"	Anindita Paul	
2006	Borokhun	"Diya Muk Diya"	Zubeen Garg, Anindita Paul	
2006	Borokhun	"Tupal Tupal"	Zubeen Garg	
2006	Borokhun	"O Mur Ronor Tejighura"	Zubeen Garg	
2006	Borokhun	"Aepahi Bukute"	Zubeen Garg	
2006	Borokhun	"Aane Jua Baate"	Zubeen Garg	
2006	Borokhun	"Aaji Punya"	Zubeen Garg	
2006	Borokhun	"Beli Poru Poru Hol"	Zubeen Garg	
2006	Mukha	"Mukha"	Zubeen Garg	
2006	Mukha	"Sweet Love"	Zubeen Garg	
2006	Mukha	"Pamne Moi Ghurai"	Zubeen Garg	
2006	Mukha	"Niyorore Phool"	Zubeen Garg	
2006	Mukha	"Dusakure Nilare"	Zubeen Garg, Arunima Bhattacharya	
2006	Mukha	"Niyore"	Zubeen Garg	
2006	Mukha	"Bukute Bukukhon"	Zubeen Garg	
2006	Mukha	"Baby Buli Lahekoi"	Zubeen Garg	
2006	Unmona Mon	"Saal Singile"	Zubeen Garg	
2006	Unmona Mon	"Jaboloi Khujute"	Zubeen Garg	
2006	Unmona Mon	"Bujiwu Nubujane"	Zubeen Garg	
2006	Unmona Mon	"Kumol Sawul"	Zubeen Garg	
2006	Unmona Mon	"Ukhol Makhol"	Zubeen Garg	
2006	Unmona Mon	"Naar Neiya Re"	Zubeen Garg	
2007	Antara	All songs	Zubeen Garg	
2007	Unmona Mon	"Saal Singile"	Zubeen Garg	
2007	Thetatre 2007	"Tumi Janane Xagor Gabhir Kiman "	Zubeen Garg	
2007	Thetatre 2007	"Aji Mon Uru Uru "	Zubeen Garg	
2008	Mur Priyo Geet	All songs	Zubeen Garg	
2008	Rumaal	All songs	Zubeen Garg	
2008	Jonaki Mon	"Bogakoi Bogoli"	Zubeen Garg	
2008	Jonaki Mon	"Agoli Bahore "	Zubeen Garg	
2008	Jonaki Mon	"Janilu Janilu"	Zubeen Garg	
2008	Jonaki Mon	"Pakhite Pakhi Logai"	Zubeen Garg	
2008	Aximot Heral Xima	"Aximot Heral Xima "	Zubeen Garg	
2010	Abujon Mon	All songs	Zubeen Garg	
2011	Baahi	All songs	Zubeen Garg	
2011	Brahmaputra Theater	"Diu Nidiu Koi"	Zubeen Garg	
2012	Runjun	All songs	Zubeen Garg	
2012	Rock	All songs	Zubeen Garg	
2012	Canvas	"Nupur Priya"	Zubeen Garg	
2013	Xaratar Pratham Nixa	"Soku Meli Suwana"	Zubeen Garg	
2013	Xaratar Pratham Nixa	"More Priya"	Zubeen Garg	
2014	Path	All songs	Zubeen Garg	
2014	Nahor	"Nahor"	Zubeen Garg	
2015	Junuka	"Junuka"	Ritirsha Sarma	
2019	Maa	All songs	Zubeen Garg	
2020	Silaa	All songs	Zubeen Garg	

=== Hindi songs ===
Year	Album	Song	Singer(s)	Ref.
1995	Chandni Raat	"Chandni Raat Hai Sanam"	Zubeen Garg	
1995	Chandni Raat	"Asha Meri Asha"	Zubeen Garg	
1995	Chandni Raat	"Maya Kaisi Hai Yeh Maya"	Zubeen Garg	
1995	Chandni Raat	"Akhiyan Hain Ya Koi"	Zubeen Garg	
1995	Chandni Raat	"Come On Sweet Girl"	Zubeen Garg	
1995	Chandni Raat	"Kaise Kahon Kab Se Mein"	Zubeen Garg, Kavita Krishnamurthy	
1995	Chandni Raat	"Mehbooba O Mehboiba"	Zubeen Garg	
1995	Chandni Raat	"Anjana O Neelanjana"	Zubeen Garg, Kavita Krishnamurthy	
1998	Chanda	"Chanda"	Zubeen Garg, Jonkey Borthakur	
1998	Chanda	"Pyar Se"	Zubeen Garg, Jonkey Borthakur	
1998	Chanda	"Kal Ko"	Zubeen Garg	
1998	Chanda	"Jeevan Hai"	Zubeen Garg	
1998	Chanda	"Geet Gane"	Zubeen Garg	
1998	Chanda	"Ye Sach Hai"	Zubeen Garg	
1998	Chanda	"Jeena"	Zubeen Garg	
1998	Chanda	"Door"	Zubeen Garg	
1998	Yuhi Kabhi	"I Need Your Love Today"	Zubeen Garg	
2000	Sparsh	"Is Duniya Ki"	Zubeen Garg	
2000	Sparsh	"Naam Apna"	Zubeen Garg	
2000	Sparsh	"Suno Yeh Asmaan"	Zubeen Garg	
2002	Channel V Jammin	"Mujhe Pyaar Ho Gaya"	KK, Suneeta Rao	
2007	Dhanyavad	"Chain Aur Sukoon"	Prashant Tamang	
2013	Pakeeza	"Pakeeza"	Zubeen Garg	
2013	Pakeeza	"Kafur"	Zubeen Garg	
2013	Pakeeza	"Piya More"	Zubeen Garg	
2013	Pakeeza	"I Can Live For You"	Zubeen Garg	
2013	Pakeeza	"Chalte Chalo Re"	Zubeen Garg	
2013	Pakeeza	"Rama Rama"	Zubeen Garg	
2013	Pakeeza	"Piya"	Zubeen Garg	
2013	Pakeeza	"Kehkasha"	Zubeen Garg	

== As a music director ==
Year	Album	Song	Singer(s)	Ref.
2000	Tumi Mur Mathu Mur	"Puhorore Saki"	Zubeen Garg, Luna Sonowal	
2000	Tumi Mur Mathu Mur	"Etiya Hiya Mur"	Zubeen Garg	
2000	Tumi Mur Mathu Mur	"Kije Palu"	Zubeen Garg	
2000	Tumi Mur Mathu Mur	"Kune Ringiyai"	Zubeen Garg	
2000	Tumi Mur Mathu Mur	"Soku Meli Saute"	Zubeen Garg	
2000	Tumi Mur Mathu Mur	"Mayabi Ei Raati"	Zubeen Garg	
2000	Tumi Mur Mathu Mur	"Gun Gun"	Zubeen Garg	
2000	Tumi Mur Mathu Mur	"Rod Aji Keni Pau"	Zubeen Garg	
2000	Hiya Diya Niya	"Nohole Porisoy"	Zubeen Garg	
2000	Hiya Diya Niya	"Buku Bhora"	Malabika Bora	
2000	Hiya Diya Niya	"Moloyar Dupakhit"	Zubeen Garg, Tarali Sarma	
2000	Hiya Diya Niya	"Kothati Bujilu"	Zubeen Garg, Tarali Sarma	
2000	Hiya Diya Niya	"Misate Misate"	Zubeen Garg, Diganta Kalita, Hiranya Deka, Chetana Das	
2000	Hiya Diya Niya	"Mitha Mitha"	Zubeen Garg, Debajit Chaudhary, Shanta Uzir	
2000	Morome Morom Jane	"Morome Morom Jane" (Title Song)	Abhijeet, Anuradha Paudwal	
2000	Morome Morom Jane	"College Class Hole"	Jojo, Mitali Choudhary	
2000	Morome Morom Jane	"Maa Kali Suwali Soku Meli"	Shanta Uzir	
2000	Morome Morom Jane	"Tamul"	Zubeen Garg, Mili	
2000	Morome Morom Jane	"Karma Amar Dharma"	Vinod Rathod, Mitali Chaudhary	
2000	Daag	All Songs	Zubeen Garg, Diganta Bharati, Utpal Sharma, Rupjyoti Devi, Jonkey Borthakur, Shashwati Phukan, Mahalakshmi Iyer	
2001	Sesh Upahar	"Porisoy Bihin"	Jinti Das	
2001	Sesh Upahar	"Amar Dusakute"	Zubeen Garg	
2001	Sesh Upahar	"Pahare Ximona"	Sangeeta Hazarika	
2001	Sesh Upahar	"Mitha Mitha"	Samson, Shibani Kashyap	
2001	Anya Ek Jatra	Dukhor Hagar	Zubeen Garg	
2001	Nayak	Monote Nu Aaji	Zubeen Garg, Arnab	
2001	Nayak	Lahe Lahe Barhise	Zubeen Garg, Shashwati Phukan	
2001	Nayak	Kinu Suriya	Zubeen Garg, Pamela	
2001	Nayak	Mon Gohonot	Zubeen Garg, Shaan, Pamela Jain, Sagarika	
2001	Nayak	Nayak Hobo	Zubeen Garg	
2001	Nayak	Motoliya Botahe	Zubeen Garg, Mahalakshmi Iyer	
2002	Prem Aru Prem	"Sokuwe Sokuwe"	Zubeen Garg, Bobita Sharma	
2002	Prem Aru Prem	"Mukuta Mukuta"	Shrutjay Das, Nirmali Das	
2002	Prem Aru Prem	"Prem Aru Prem"	Zubeen Garg	
2002	Prem Aru Prem	"Biyopi Biyopi"	Zubeen Garg, Bristi	
2002	Prem Aru Prem	"Momor Sikati"	Zubeen Garg	
2002	Prem Aru Prem	"Mukuli Mon"	Zubeen Garg and chorus	
2002	Prem Aru Prem	"Bor Moja Nohoi"	Zubeen Garg, Kashmiri Saikia Baruah	
2002	Prem Aru Prem	"Morom Edhani Morom"	Zubeen Garg, Anindita Paul	
2002	Kanyadaan	"Uth Gutibo Janane"	Zubeen Garg, Mahalakshmi Iyer, Shashwati Phukan	
2002	Kanyadaan	"Bandhoi Oi"	Zubeen Garg	
2002	Kanyadaan	"Choua Choua"	Zubeen Garg	
2002	Kanyadaan	"Hun Rupereu"	Zubeen Garg, Manas Robin, Jonkey Bothakur	
2002	Kanyadaan	"Lahiyale Ronga Beli"	Zubeen Garg, Shashwati Phukan	
2002	Kanyadaan	"Neela Neela"	Zubeen Garg, Kalpana Patowary	
2002	Jonaki Mon	"Osina Dekhot"	Zubeen Garg	
2002	Jonaki Mon	"Boge Dhoke Dhoki"	Zubeen Garg, Shashwati Phukan	
2002	Jonaki Mon	"Tumi Suriya"	Zubeen Garg, Kashmiri Saikia Baruah	
2002	Jonaki Mon	"Phule Phule"	Zubeen Garg, Arnab, Pamela Jain, Shaan, Sagarika	
2002	Jonaki Mon	"Tumi Janane"	Pamela Jain and chorus	
2002	Jonaki Mon	"Junake Junake"	Pamela Jain and chorus	
2002	Jonaki Mon	"Anguli Bulale"	Zubeen Garg, Bobita Sharma	
2002	Jibon Nadir Duti Paar	"Ei Ghar Amar"	Zubeen Garg, Jonkey, Prem, Arnab	
2002	Jibon Nadir Duti Paar	"Kokal Khamusiya"	Zubeen Garg, Mahalakshmi Iyer	
2002	Jibon Nadir Duti Paar	"Pritire Juri"	Zubeen Garg, Rupankita Papori	
2002	Jibon Nadir Duti Paar	"Jibon Nadir Duti Paar"	Zubeen Garg	
2002	Jibon Nadir Duti Paar	"Bibabhoria Amare"	Zubeen Garg, Kashmiri Saikia	
2002	Jibon Nadir Duti Paar	"Umi Umi"	Zubeen Garg, Mahalakshmi Iyer	
2002	Jibon Nadir Duti Paar	"Kiyonu Joli"	Zubeen Garg	
2003	Agnisakshi	"Mahadev Keni Gol"	Zubeen Garg, Manas Robin, Mousumi Chahriya, Deepak	
2003	Agnisakshi	"Asati Pronoyor"	Zubeen Garg, Mitali Chaudhary	
2003	Agnisakshi	"Jibone Proti Pole"	Zubeen Garg	
2003	Agnisakshi	"Tumi Xun Amare"	Zubeen Garg, Mousumi Chahariya	
2003	Agnisakshi	"Karubar Sokuwe"	Zubeen Garg	
2003	Agnisakshi	"Tumi Xun Amare" (Sad Version)	Utpal Sharma	
2003	Agnisakshi	"Jibone Proti Khuje"	Zubeen Garg	
2003	Agnisakshi	"Om Prajapataye"	Zubeen Garg	
2003	Priya Milon	"Bhal Pau Buli"	Zubeen Garg, Mahalakshmi Iyer	
2003	Priya Milon	"Sapunor Moromi"	Zubeen Garg, Shashwati Phukan	
2003	Priya Milon	"Morai Sorai"	Zubeen Garg, Shashwati Phukan	
2003	Priya Milon	"Come Come"	Zubeen Garg, Nivedita	
2003	Priya Milon	"Phule Phule Koto Rang"	Zubeen Garg, Shashwati Phukan	
2003	Priya Milon	"Nai Eko Nai"	Zubeen Garg, Nirmali Das	
2003	Priya Milon	"Monore Priya Mur"	Zubeen Garg	
2003	Bidhata	"Dhuniya Dhuniya"	Zubeen Garg, Parineeta Borthakur, Sourin, Shashwati Phukan	
2003	Bidhata	"Atori Atori"	Zubeen Garg, Shashwati Phukan	
2003	Bidhata	"Tetera Tetera"	Zubeen Garg	
2003	Bidhata	"Alfule Haboti"	Zubeen Garg	
2003	Bidhata	"Bidhata" (Theme Song)	Zubeen Garg	
2003	Bidhata	"Ja Ja Atori Ja"	Zubeen Garg	
2003	Bidhata	"Haribol"	Zubeen Garg	
2003	Bidhata	"Shyamkanu"	Shashwati Phukan	
2003	Juman Suman	"Hopune Dithoke"	Zubeen Garg, Shashwati Phukan	
2003	Juman Suman	"Tumi Janene"	Zubeen Garg, Bhitali Das	
2003	Juman Suman	"Ei Duniya"	Zubeen Garg	
2003	Juman Suman	"Nas Nasone"	Zubeen Garg	
2003	Juman Suman	"Hahi Hahi"	Zubeen Garg, Kallol	
2003	Juman Suman	"Moriye Ja"	Zubeen Garg	
2003	Juman Suman	"Halodhi Mahere"	Zubeen Garg	
2003	Juman Suman	"Kola Kola"	Zubeen Garg	
2004	Barood	"Dekh Khon"	Zubeen Garg	
2004	Barood	"Khomajoke"	Zubeen Garg	
2004	Barood	"Dekho Je Sapno"	Zubeen Garg, Shashwati Phukan	
2004	Barood	"Monore"	Zubeen Garg, Pamela	
2004	Barood	"Puju Aaha"	Zubeen Garg	
2004	Barood	"Ghomoke Pora"	Padmini Kohlapure	
2004	Rong	"Ethengiya Bogoli"	Zubeen Garg, Subasana Dutta	
2004	Rong	"Sayar Dore"	Zubeen Garg	
2004	Rong	"Rong Tumi"	Zubeen Garg, Mahalakshmi Iyer	
2004	Rong	"Ghar Amar"	Shashwati Phukan, Mahalakshmi Iyer, Padmini Kolhapure	
2004	Rong	"Morubhou Tumi"	Zubeen Garg, Shashwati Phukan	
2004	Dinabandhu	"Kor Ejak"	Anindita Paul	
2004	Dinabandhu	"Diya Muk Diya"	Zubeen Garg, Anindita Paul	
2006	Adhinayak	"Aji Ene Ghotona Hol"	Zubeen Garg, Manas Robin	
2006	Adhinayak	"Osinaki Duti"	Zubeen Garg, Navanita Bora	
2006	Adhinayak	"Sapunor Pahe Pahe"	Zubeen Garg, Anindita Paul	
2006	Adhinayak	"Posuwa Bolise"	Zubeen Garg, Bhitali Das	
2006	Adhinayak	"Apun Buli Jakei"	Zubeen Garg	
2006	Adhinayak	"Kinu Akhat Kinu Bhabi O"	Zubeen Garg	
2008	Mon Jaai	"Mon Jaai"	Zubeen Garg	
2008	Mon Jaai	"Dhire Dhire Herai Jaai"	Zubeen Garg	
2008	Mon Jaai	"Anurag Etiya"	Zubeen Garg	
2008	Mon Jaai	"Hahi Heruwai"	Diganta Bharati	
2014	Rodor Sithi	"Pratidine"	Zubeen Garg	
2014	Rodor Sithi	"Rodor Sithi"	Zubeen Garg	
2014	Rodor Sithi	"Endhare" (Version 1)	Papon	
2014	Rodor Sithi	"Akashe Diya"	Zubeen Garg	
2014	Rodor Sithi	"Protidine" (Version 2)	Papon	
2014	Rodor Sithi	"Endhare" (Version 2)	Zubeen Garg	
2016	Gaane Ki Aane	"Janu Janu"	Zubeen Garg, Parineeta Borthakur	
2016	Gaane Ki Aane	"Gaanore Potharote"	Zubeen Garg	
2016	Gaane Ki Aane	"Xaliki Puwar"	Mahalakshmi Iyer	
2016	Gaane Ki Aane	"Dancing Tonight"	Zubeen Garg, Anindita Paul	
2016	Gaane Ki Aane	"Aahu Nahu"	Madhusmita Borthakur	
2016	Gaane Ki Aane	"Tumi Rodali"	Mahalakshmi Iyer	
2016	Gaane Ki Aane	"Gaane Ki Aane"	Zubeen Garg, Parineeta Borthakur	
2017	Mission China	"Din Jwole Raati Jwole"	Zubeen Garg, Zublee	
2017	Mission China	"Mero Mayalaai"	Zubeen Garg, Satabdi Borah	
2017	Mission China	"Nano Se Nikhalte"	Nachiketa Choudhary, Turi	
2017	Mission China	"Raat Jwole"	Mrinmoyee Goswami	
2017	Mission China	"Every Morning Comes"	Joi Barua, Zubeen Garg	
2017	Mission China	"Mission China" (Theme Song)	Zubeen Garg, Siddharth Hazarika, Rohit Sonar, Amit Paul	
2017	Mission China	"Naino Se Nikhalte"	Zubeen Garg, Turi	
2017	Priyaar Priyo	"O Priya"	Zubeen Garg, Bornali Kalita, Ritrisha Sarma	
2017	Priyaar Priyo	"Akuli Bikuli"	Zubeen Garg, Nahid Afrin	
2017	Priyaar Priyo	"Priyar Priyo"	Zubeen Garg, Neel Akash, Kumar Bhabesh	
2017	Priyaar Priyo	"Priyaro Priyaro Bosono"	Zubeen Garg, Mayurpankhi	
2018	The Underworld	"Jaatonare"	Ananya Dutta, Zubeen Garg	
2018	The Underworld	"Supeman"	Zubeen Garg	
2018	The Underworld	"Thoda Sa Therer Ja"	Parineeta Borthakur	
2018	The Underworld	"Ulahe Abore"	Goldie Sohel, Kaveri Singh, Parineeta Borthakur, Zubeen Garg	
2018	The Underworld	"The Underworld Theme"	Rahul Gautam Sharma, Zubeen Garg	
2018	The Underworld	"Tupa Tupe"	Mousam Gogoi, Satabdi Borah	
2019	Kanchanjangha	"Dhulikona"	Zubeen Garg, Zublee Baruah, Panchana Rabha	
2019	Kanchanjangha	"Priti Bhora"	Zubeen Garg, Gayatri Hazarika	
2019	Kanchanjangha	"Rikto Xikto"	Zubeen Garg, Rahul Gautam Sharma, Gauranga	
2019	Kanchanjangha	"Panchana"	Zubeen Garg, Panchana Rabha	
2019	Kanchanjangha	"Kanchanjangha"	Zubeen Garg, Rahul Gautam Sharma, Aum S Varenyam	
2019	Kanchanjangha	"Priti Bhora" (Version 2)	Zubeen Garg, Mansi	
2019	Ratnakar	"Eta Kotha"	Zubeen Garg, Harchita Bhattacharya	
2019	Ratnakar	"Bhal Poware"	Zubeen Garg, Satabdi Bora	
2019	Ratnakar	"Koli Meliley"	Zubeen Garg, Navanita Sharma Bora	
2019	Ratnakar	"Rati Rati"	Zubeen Garg, Gayatri Hazarika	
2019	Ratnakar	"Ratnakar" (Theme Music)	Joshua Queah, Synicah	
2019	Pratighaat	"Pratighaat" (Title Track)	Zubeen Garg	
2022	Dr. Bezbaruah 2	"Jiliki Jilika"	Zubeen Garg, Synicha	
2022	Dr. Bezbaruah 2	"Ki Naam Di Maatim"	Zubeen Garg,	
2022	Dr. Bezbaruah 2	"Phool Phool"	Zubeen Garg, Zublee	
2022	Dr. Bezbaruah 2	"Moina Kun Bidhatai"	Zubeen Garg,	
2022	Dr. Bezbaruah 2	"Title Track"	Zubeen Garg,	
2023	Joddha	"Ei Mayabi Rati"	Zubeen Garg, Synicah	
2023	Raghav	"Maa"	Zubeen Garg	
2023	Raghav	"Sari Soka"	Zubeen Garg	
2023	Raghav	"Silmil Tuponite"	Zubeen Garg, Mahalaxmi Iyer	
2023	Raghav	"Sari Soka" (Film Version)	Zubeen Garg, Prabin Bora	
2024	Sikaar	"Ekadosi Ratiya"	Zubeen Garg, Achurjya Borpatra	
2024	Sikaar	"Xaturangi"	Zubeen Garg, Parishmita Phukan	
2024	Sikaar	"London Dreams"	Apache Indian, Usha Uthup	
2024	Sikaar	"Ekadosi Ratiya" (Remix)	Zubeen Garg, Achurjya Borpatra	
2024	Sikaar	"Sikaar"	Zubeen Garg, Gitanjali Das	
2025	Bhaimon Da	"Era Eri"	Zubeen Garg, Mahalakshmi Iyer	
2025	Bhaimon Da	"Era Eri" (Acoustic)	Zubeen Garg, Amritprava Mahanta	
2025	Bhaimon Da	"Beer Brandy Whiskey"	Prabin Borah	
2025	Bhaimon Da	"Hiya Diya Niya" (BGM)	Debo Geetz	
2025	Joddha: The Warrior of Life	"Esati Xopune"	Zubeen Garg, Meghna Borpuzari	
2025	Joddha: The Warrior of Life	"Misikiya Dusakure"	Zubeen Garg, Sangita Hazarika	
2025	Joddha: The Warrior of Life	"Neelimoy Neela Hoy"	Zubeen Garg, Synciah	
2025	Homework	"Jantra"	Zubeen Garg	
2025	Roi Roi Binale	"Roi Roi Binale" (Title Track)	Zubeen Garg	
2025	Roi Roi Binale	"Mur Mon"	Zubeen Garg, Sweety Das	
2025	Roi Roi Binale	"Xopun Xopun"	Zubeen Garg, Moromi Sharma	
2025	Roi Roi Binale	"Free Bird"	Joi Barua, Papon	
2025	Roi Roi Binale	"Dusokur Kajolere"	Sabita Sharma Goswami, Anurdhati Bhanupriya	
2025	Roi Roi Binale	"Tumar Nilim Kothar Dore"	Zubeen Garg	
2025	Roi Roi Binale	"Sokulure Roi Roi Binale"	Zubeen Garg, Achurjya Borpatra	
2025	Roi Roi Binale	"Mon Gole"	Zubeen Garg, Fency Rajkumari, Achurjya Borpatra	
2025	Roi Roi Binale	"Jun Jwoli"	Zubeen Garg	
2025	Roi Roi Binale	"Kore Pora Aahi"	Neel Akash	
2025	Roi Roi Binale	"Mukuta Mukuta"	Zubeen Garg, Students of Abhinaya	
2026	Koka Deutar Nati Aaru Hati 2	"Runjun Nupure Mate"	Zubeen Garg	

== As a lyricist ==
Year	Album	Songs
1992	Anamika	"Hahile Tumi" (Anamika)
1992	Anamika	"Hiya Dohe"
1992	Anamika	"Monor Nijanot"
1992	Anamika	"Kio Janu Aaji"
1992	Anamika	"Huna Huna"
1992	Sapunor Sur	"Nibir Junaki Rati"
1992	Sapunor Sur	"Sopunore Pokhi"
1992	Sapunor Sur	"Bihure Boliya Mon"
1992	Sapunor Sur	"Imaan Moromore Jonaki"
1992	Sapunor Sur	"Jetiya Torali Phule"
1992	Sapunor Sur	"Etiya Padulite Ase Roi Konoba"
1992	Kar Babe	"Buku Bhora Rati"
1993	Junaki Mon	"Dur Duronire Mon Jonaki Mon"
1993	Junaki Mon	"Sokulore Bhora"
1993	Junaki Mon	"Nisatiye Kinu"
1993	Ritu	"Duroni Duroni"
1993	Ritu	"Tumi Jonaki Xubakh"
1993	Ritu	"Tumi Janu Pariba Xun"
1993	Ritu	"Mone Mur Kiyo Aji"
1993	Anuradha	"Mon Boi Jai"
1993	Anuradha	"Jun Gola Rati"
1993	Anuradha	"Kune Jane"
1993	Anuradha	"Jonome Jonome"
1993	Anuradha	"Tumi Diya Morome"
1994	Puberun	"Xopunor Kothabur"
1994	Maya	"Maya"
1994	Maya	"Dure Dure"
1994	Maya	"Unmona Mone"
1994	Maya	"Niribili Godhuli"
1994	Maya	"Junake Kane Kane"
1995	Asha	"Asha"
1995	Asha	"Jolila Puria"
1995	Asha	"Abhimani Mon"
1995	Asha	"Tumi Jodi Kuwa"
1995	Asha	"Tumi Janane"
1995	Asha	"Aami Jen"
1995	Asha	"Mur Mon"
1995	Zubeenor Gaan	"Atiya Ase Mathu"
1995	Zubeenor Gaan	"Umi Umi"
1995	Zubeenor Gaan	"Tumi Nidiya"
1995	Zubeenor Gaan	"Akilu Sobikhoni"
1995	Zubeenor Gaan	"Etiyaru Hare Aasu"
1995	Zubeenor Gaan	"Lahe Lahe"
1995	Zubeenor Gaan	"Endhare Hobo Nuwaru"
1996	Rong	All songs
1996	Jan Moni	"Jaanmoni O Posuwa"
1997	Mukti	"Sokuwe Sokuwe"
1997	Mukti	"Sunere Sojuwa"
1997	Mukti	"Meghor Boron"
1997	Mukti	"Obak Obak"
1997	Mukti	"Pratitu Prahar"
1997	Mukti	"Ujolai Rakhisu"
1997	Mukti	"Mukti"
1998	Snigdha Jonak	"Nasaba Sokule"
1998	Snigdha Jonak	"Fagun Ahile Boi"
1998	Sabda	All songs
1998	Pansoi	"Door Duronire Mon Junaki Mon"
1998	Pansoi	"Nikhatiye Kinu Koi"
1999	Megha	
1999	Meghor Boron	All songs
1999	Bhor Dhuporiya	
1999	Rangdhali	
1999	Pakhi	All songs
1999	Hopun	"Xomoy Jen"
1999	Mann	"Jetuka Jetuka"
2000	Sparsh	
2000	Sapun	"Kola Soku Juri"
2001	Mere Liye	
2001	Nupur	
2001	Panchoi	"Fagunor Posuwa"
2001	Panchoi	"Dukhor Bahi"
2001	Panchoi	"Hemeka Ei"
2001	Hiyamon	"Owfuliya"
2002	Shishu	"Bhoba Kotha"
2002	Shishu	"Mugdho Hiya Mur"
2002	Shishu	"Kaar Porokh"
2002	Shishu	"Diya Ghurai Diya"
2002	Shishu	"Aaukhir Jun Mur"
2002	Shishu	"Shanti Diya"
2002	Shishu	"Kaahi Baati"
2002	Bihuwan	"Bare Kisim Bhabonai"
2002	Bandhoi	
2002	Sandhya - A Tribute to Ambikagiri Rai Choudhry	"Nital Nikha"
2003	Sinaki Mon	"Bhal Pau Ne"
2003	Mur Xuria Geet	"Achina Dekhote"
2003	Mur Xuria Geet	"Alakananda"
2003	Mur Xuria Geet	"Xomoyo Jen"
2003	Mur Xuria Geet	"Tumi Xuriya"
2004	Jantra	"Maina Maina"
2004	Jantra	"Jantra"
2004	Jantra	"Aei Maya Dhorat"
2004	Jantra	"Alop Hanti Diya"
2004	Jantra	"I Love You Buli Kolu Moi"
2004	Lajuki Mon	"Dhinki Dhin Dao"
2004	Tomar Akash	
2006	Mukha	"Mukha Mukha"
2006	Mukha	"Sweet Love"
2006	Mukha	"Pamne Moi Ghurai"
2006	Mukha	"Baby Buli Lahekoi"
2006	Mukha	"Dusakure Nilare"
2006	Mukha	"Bukute Bukukhon"
2007	Tumi	
2008	Jonaki Mon	"Bogakoi Bogoli"
2008	Rumaal	"Rumaal Rumaal"
2008	Rumaal	"Aai Mur Oi"
2008	Rumaal	"Tumi Hkhubakh"
2008	Rumaal	"Hai Hai Mari Dila"
2008	Aximot Heral Xima	"Aximot Heral Xima"
2011	Baahi	"Baahi Tumi"
2011	Baahi	"Ghuri Suasun Ebar"
2011	Baahi	"Anuradha"
2011	Baahi	"Tumi Kun Kun"
2011	Baahi	"Sapun Rongor"
2011	Baahi	"Lora Hori Naam"
2011	Baahi	"Nodi Nodi"
2011	Baahi	"Heiro Baahi"
2011	Brahmaputra Theater	"Diu Nidiu Koi"
2012	Runjun	"Runjun Nupur Mate"
2012	Runjun	"Polakhor Rong"
2012	Runjun	"Jibon Dinga"
2012	Runjun	"Subhra Bolakar"
2012	Runjun	"Xunil Gagan Juri"
2012	Sonali Mon	"Junakor Borokhun"
2012	Rock	"Ejak Borokhune"
2012	Rock	"Gaan Diya"
2012	Rock	"Tumi Prajapati"
2012	Rock	"Senorita"
2012	Rock	"Jiu Tumi"
2012	Rock	"Dusakure Nilimate"
2012	Rock	"Rajani Dhuhkhor"
2012	Rock	"Swadhinataa"
2012	Rock	"Bismillah"
2012	Rock	"Tip Tip"
2012	Rock	"Rock Rock Rock"
2013	Pakeeza	All songs
2013	Xaratar Pratham Nixa	"Soku Meli Suwana"
2013	Xaratar Pratham Nixa	"More Priya"
2014	Path	"Siki Miki"
2014	Path	"Mahadev"
2015	Junuka	"Junuka"
2019	Maa	"Politics Nokoriba Bondhu"
2019	Maa	"Mur Monore Kolpona"
2019	Maa	"Tumi Jen Popiya Tora"
2019	Maa	"Ketiyaba"
2019	Maa	"Nisukoni Geet"
2020	Silaa	"Silaa"
2020	Silaa	"Eku Je Nai"

List of uncredited works by Zubeen Garg.

Year	Song/Score	Movie/Album	Lead Singer	Music Director	Ref

== Unpublished Works ==
List of unpublished works by Zubeen Garg

Song/Score	Movie/Album	Lead Singer	Music Director

== As a musical instrumentalist ==
While most albums did not credit the names of many musicians, a selected few songs featured, which he remained uncredited. The following were provided below:

Year	Album	Song	Guitar	Tabla	Mandolin	Keyboard	Flute	Others	Singer
1997	Duniya	"Maine Dekhe Hain Sabhi Rang Duniya Ke"	Yes	No	No	No	No	No	Raageshwari
1997	Mukti	"Pratitu Prahar"	Yes	No	No	No	No	No	Himself
1998	Sobdo	"Jogot Puhor Kori"	No	No	No	Yes	No	No	Himself
1999	Pakhi	"Bukute Gupute"	No	Yes	No	No	No	No	Himself
2001	Only U	"Tum Ho Mere"	Yes	No	No	No	No	No	Shikha
2002	Kuwoli	"Kinu Botah Khai Gabhoru Holi"	Yes	No	No	No	No	No	Shaan
2002	Shishu	"Bhoba Kotha"	No	No	Yes	No	No	No	Himself
2002	Mahalakshmi	"Judaa Ho"	Yes	No	No	No	Yes	No	Mahalakshmi Iyer
2005	Astro Premor	"Tur Ronga Ronga"	No	No	No	Yes	No	No	Kollol Borthakur
2006	Mukha	"Pamne Moi Ghurai"	Yes	No	No	No	No	No	Himself
2007	Zindagi	"Jia Re Jia Re"	Yes	No	No	No	No	No	Himself
2019	Maa	"Politics Nokoriba Bondhu"	No	No	No	No	No	Yes	Himself
