= Adhinayak =

- Film poster
- Directed by: Jatin Bora
- Written by: Munin Barua
- Produced by: Likhon Chamua
- Starring: Jatin Bora; Arup Bora; Nishita Goswami; Hiranya Deka; Chetana Das
- Cinematography: Suman Duarah
- Music by: Zubeen Garg
- Release date: 17 February 2006
- Running time: 160 minutes
- Country: India
- Language: Assamese

Adhinayak (English: Captain) is a 2006 Indian Assamese language drama film directed by Jatin Bora. The film is the directorial debut of Jatin Bora who himself plays the protagonist. The film was released on 17 February 2006 simultaneously at Tezpur, Nagaon and Dhemaji.

== Synopsis ==
The story revolves around a mechanic named Raja and his relationships with the other characters.

== Cast ==
- Jatin Bora as Raja
- Nishita Goswami as Shanti
- Rimpi Das
- Arup Bora as Nayan
- Nikumoni Barua
- Guna Mahanta
- Dilip Barua
- Basabi Bhuyan
- Arun Hazarika
- Bhabesh Das
- Jowan Dutta
- Suren Bora
- Child artist Jishnu Kakati
- Chetana Das
- Prastuti Parashar
- Jayanta Das
- Upakul Bordoloi
- Hiranya Das
- Debajit Mazumdar
- Avatosh Bhuyan

== Soundtrack ==
Adhinayak

Soundtrack album by Zubeen Garg
- Released: 6 November 2005
- Recorded: 2005
- Genre: Feature film soundtrack
- Length: 31:26
- Language: Assamese
- Label: NK Production; Universal Music India

Zubeen Garg chronology
Dinabandhoo (2004)	Adhinayak (2005)	Aami Axomiya (2006)

The music of Adhinayak is composed by Zubeen Garg.

Lyrics were written by Zubeen Garg, Hemanta Dutta, Manas Robin, Diganta Bharati and Mousam Gogoi.

The Song "Apun Buli Jakei" was reused from one of Garg's earlier compositions in the Bengali film Shudhu Tumi (2004), where he sang "Bheja Bheja Smiritir Pathor".

Track listing
No.	Title	Lyrics	Singer(s)	Length
1.	"Osinaki Duti Mone"	Diganta Bharati	Zubeen Garg, Nabanita Sarma	5:12
2.	"Xopunor Pahe Pahe"	Hemanta Dutta	Zubeen Garg, Anindita Paul	4:32
3.	"Posuwa Bolise"	Mousam Gogoi	Zubeen Garg, Bhitali Das	4:43
4.	"Apun Buli Jakei"	Diganta Bharati	Zubeen Garg	5:00
5.	"Aji Ene Ghotona Hol"	Manas Robin, Diganta Bharati	Zubeen Garg, Diganta Bharati	4:55
6.	"Kinu Akhat Kinu Bhabi O"	Zubeen Garg, Hemanta Dutta	Zubeen Garg	4:55
Total length:				31:26

== See also ==
- Assamese cinema
