= Nishita Goswami =

Indian actress

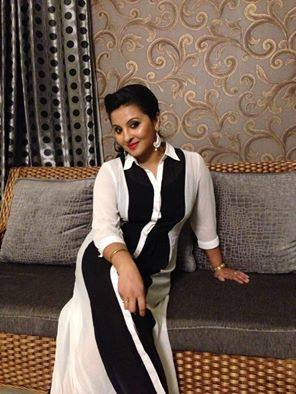
- Goswami in 2014
- Occupation: Actress
- Years active: 2002–present
- Spouse: Sayan Chakravarty (m. 2011)
- Mother: Moloya Goswami
- Relatives: Arnab Chakrabarty (brother-in-law)

Nishita Goswami is an Indian actress who works in Assamese language films. Her notable Assamese films are Rong, Ratnakar, Hold My Hand, Mon, etc. She has also acted in a number of stage dramas.

== Personal life ==
Goswami is Assamese and is the daughter of actress Moloya Goswami and Pradip Goswami. She hails from Guwahati. She married Sayan Chakravarty, a Bengali computer engineer and businessman from Shillong, Meghalaya in 2011.

== Career ==
Goswami debuted as a child artist with her first film Prem Rati Phula Phool and as a lead role in the film Mon in Assamese in 2002 and in Bengali in 2003 (opposite Ravi Sarma and Kopil Bora), which was considered to be as her first Bengali film. She then went on making films with Munin Baruah (Rong and Raamdhenu), Prerana Barbarooah (Hold My Hand and Jonaki Ali) and Jatin Bora (Ratnakar and Raghav).

After Mon, she acted several theatre films as well as VCD films like Rong, Kadambari, Collie, Suren Suror Putek, Adhinayak, Monjai, Dhan Kuberor Dhan etc.

== Filmography ==
Film acted
Year	Title	Director	Notes
1988	Rati Phula Phool	Sangor Sarkar	Child artist
2002	Mon	Bani Das	Dubbed in Bengali film. Best Debut Actress, 2003 by Moonlight Media Awards, Jyoti Rupa Awards, and Prag Cine Awards
2004	Rong	Munin Barua	
2004	Kadambari	Bani Das	Best Actress Award - Prag Cine Awards
2004	Coolie	Swapan Saha	Bengali film
2004	Dinabandhoo	Munin Barua	Best Actress Award - North East People's Choice Awards
2005	Astaraag	Siva Prasad Thakur	
2006	Suren Suror Putek	Chandra Mudoi	Best Actress Award by North East Sports and Cultural Organization
2006	Adhinayak	Jatin Bora	
2007	Hridoy Jetia Sagor Hoi	Sanjay Sarkar	
2008	Hold My Hand	Prerana Barbarooah	She played a character whose mother was played by her mother, Actress Moloya Goswami.
2008	Dhon Kuberor Dhon	Dhiraj Kashyap	
2008	Mon Jaai	M. Maniram	
2011	Raamdhenu	Munin Barua	
2011	Samiran Barua Ahi Ase	Prodyut Kumar Deka	
2012	Rishang	Manas Barua	
2013	Mone Mur Koina Bisare	Sada Nanda Gogoi	
2013	Aparajita	Mustaq Ahmed	
2014	Jonaki Ali	Prerana Barbarooah	An amazing representation of the role.
2014	Jilmil Jonak	Sibanan Baruah	
2015	Khobh	Hiren Saikia	
2016	Sohra Bridge	Bappaditya Bandopadhyay	
2016	Lokabandhoo	Dhiraj Kashyap	
2019	Ratnakar	Jatin Bora	

Films directed
Year	Title	Notes
2007	Manas	Documentary film based on Manas National Park
2006	The Search	Short digital film based on gay rights
2009	Saath Jon Saki Ek Joni Rakhoshi	Children's play on behalf of Arahan (Dr BhabendraNath Saikia Welfare Trust)
2011	Xantosixto Hristopusto Mohadusto	Talent show for children aired on DY365 channel
2015	Temples and Monuments of Assam	Documentary film for Assam Tourism

Television acted
Year	Title	Director	Notes
2019	Beharbari Outpost	Monoj Saikia	as DSP

== Awards and nominations ==
=== Filmfare awards (Assamese) ===
Year	Nominated work	Category	Result	Ref.
2014	Mone Mur Koina Bisare	Best actor (female)	Nominated	
