= Jonaki Mon =

- Directed by: Jibanraj Barman
- Produced by: Hiranya Kumar Rajkhowa
- Starring: Bibhash Chakraborty; Tanvi Sharma; Nipon Goswami; Mridula Baruah; Chetana Das; Tina Barla
- Edited by: A. Sreekar Prasad
- Music by: Zubeen Garg
- Release date: 22 March 2002
- Running time: 175 min
- Country: India
- Language: Assamese

Jonaki Mon (Assamese: জোনাকী মন) is a 2002 Indian Assamese drama film directed by Jibanraj Barman and produced by Dinesh Kumar Rajkhowa.

== Cast ==
- Bibhash Chakraborty
- Tanvi Sharma
- Nipon Goswami
- Mridula Baruah
- Chetana Das
- Tina Barla
- Jatin Bora (Guest appearance)
- Prastuti Parashar (Guest appearance)
- Barsha Rani Bishaya (Guest appearance)

== Soundtrack ==
Jonaki Mon

Soundtrack album by Zubeen Garg
- Released: October 2001
- Recorded: 2001
- Genre: Feature film soundtrack
- Language: Assamese
- Label: N.K. Production
- Producer: Zubeen Garg

Zubeen Garg chronology
Kanyadaan (2002)	Jonaki Mon (2001)	Jibon Nadir Duti Paar (2002)

The music soundtrack of the film was composed by Zubeen Garg except where noted. The songs were sung by Zubeen Garg, Mahalakshmi Iyer, Arnab Chakrabarty, Krishnamani Nath, Jonkey Borthakur, Papori Sharma, Babita Sharma, Shashwati Phukan, Bhitali Das, Kashmiri Saikia Baruah as well as leading Bollywood playback singers Pamela Jain, Shaan and Sagarika Mukherjee.

Tracklists
No.	Title	Singer(s)	Length
1.	"Anguli Bulale"	Zubeen Garg, Babita Sharma
2.	"Tumi Suriya Sapunor"	Zubeen Garg, Kashmiri Saikia Baruah
3.	"Boge Dhake Dhoki"	Zubeen Garg, Shashwati Phukan, Papori Sharma
4.	"Phule Phule Aji Huoni"	Zubeen Garg, Shaan, Arnab Chakrabarty, Pamela Jain, Sagarika
5.	"Junaki Junor" (Bihu Version)	Krishnamoni Nath, Bhitali Das
6.	"Junake Junake"	Pamela Jain
7.	"Tumi Janane Tumi Bujane"	Pamela Jain, Sagarika, Jonkey Borthakur
8.	"Door Duronire Mon Jonaki Mon"	Zubeen Garg, Sagarika
