= Kanyadaan (2002 film) =

- Directed by: Munin Barua
- Written by: Munin Barua
- Screenplay by: Munin Barua
- Produced by: C.S. Narayan; Swaraj Das (Baba)
- Starring: Jatin Bora; Mridula Baruah; Rituparna Borkotoki
- Cinematography: Suman Dowerah
- Edited by: A. Sreekar Prasad
- Music by: Zubeen Garg
- Release date: 19 March 2002
- Running time: 169 mins
- Country: India
- Language: Assamese

Kanyadaan (lit. 'Kanyadan') is a 2002 Indian Assamese-language family drama film directed by Munin Barua.

== Story ==
The story is based on a joint family of a place called Bokulpur. The protagonist of the movie (Jatin Bora) is the youngest son of the family who falls in love with a girl from a wealthy background of the town. He has three brothers and three sisters in law. The sisters in law knows about his fascination towards the girl but the brothers are not aware of it. It is social movie projecting a simple family of the middle-class background.

== Cast ==
- Jatin Bora as Utpal Baruah
- Rituparna Kataki as Reema
- Arun Nath as Vijoy Baruah
- Mridula Baruah as Joya
- Dr Hadi Alam Borah as Reema's father
- Jayanta Das as Vinanda Baruah
- Madhurima Chaudhury as Neera
- Bhaskar Bora as Vinoy Boruah
- Purabi Sarma as Rubi
- Chetana Das
- Hiranya Deka as Phonidhor
- Tapan Das as Ronjit Phukan
- Manjula Baruah
- Jagadish Bhuyan
- Rashami Desai (cameo)

== Soundtrack ==
Kanyadaan

Soundtrack album by Zubeen Garg
- Released: November 2001
- Genre: Film soundtrack
- Labels: Pooja Motion Pictures; Sangam Pictures; NK Production; HK Music
- Producer: Zubeen Garg

Zubeen Garg chronology
Prem Aru Prem (2001)	Kanyadaan (2001)	Jonaki Mon (2002)

The soundtrack album of the film Kanyadaan was composed by Zubeen Garg. The album contains 7 tracks (6 original songs + 1 title track). The track "Ul Guthibo Jaanene" was reused later in Bengali Song as "Gun Gun Gun Gunjare" sung by Shreya Ghoshal and Sagarika in the film Shudhu Tumi (2004).

Track list
No.	Title	Lyrics	Artist(s)	Length
1.	"Ul Guthibo Janene"	Manas Robin	Shashwati Phukan, Mahalakshmi Iyer, Zubeen Garg	4:40
2.	"Bandhoi Oi"	Diganta Bharati	Zubeen Garg	4:27
3.	"Sowa Sowa"	Zubeen Garg	Zubeen Garg, Mitali Borkotoki	5:26
4.	"Hun Rupereu"	Diganta Bharati	Zubeen Garg, Manas Robin, Jonkey Borthakur, JP Das	5:42
5.	"Lohiyale Ronga Beli"	Manas Robin	Zubeen Garg, Nirmali Das	5:25
6.	"Neela Neela"	Zubeen Garg	Zubeen Garg, Kalpana Patowary	5:00
7.	"Kanyadaan" (Theme Music)		Zubeen Garg	3:00
