= Kaal Sandhya =

- Poster of the film
- Directed by: Bhabendra Nath Saikia
- Written by: Bhabendra Nath Saikia
- Starring: Debashree Roy; Ashish Vidyarthi; Jatin Bora; Nipon Goswami; Pranjal Saikia; Hemen Barman; Munin Barua; Mridula Baruah
- Cinematography: Raju Misra
- Edited by: Ujjal Nandi
- Music by: Gautam Mukherjee
- Release date: 1997
- Running time: 124 minutes
- Country: India
- Language: Hindi

Kaal Sandhya is a 1997 Indian Hindi crime drama film dwelling on militancy in Assam, directed by Bhabendra Nath Saikia. The film deals with the theme of the impact of the insurgency on common people. It stars Jatin Bora, Ashish Vidyarthi, Debashree Roy, Nipon Goswami, Pranjal Saikia, Hemen Barman, Munin Barua and Mridula Baruah in the lead roles.

The film was screened at the International Film Festival of India in New Delhi that year and also as part of the Indian section at the Cairo International Film festival.

== Plot summary ==
Ranjit, an educated and unemployed young man, is drawn into militancy. As armed insurgents indulge in targeted killings he too is involved in the killing of Anuradha's husband. A few days later, a professor of the local college, Banajit Dutta too is shot dead. Ranjit grows close to the family of the professor as time goes by and is tortured by guilt and remorse.

== Cast ==
- Debashree Roy
- Ashish Vidyarthi
- Jatin Bora
- Nipon Goswami
- Hemen Barman
- Munin Barua
- Mridula Baruah
- Nikumoni Baruah
- Rajeeb Bhattacharyya
- Upakul Bordoloi
- Chetana Das
- Jayanta Das
- Sangeeta Goswami
- Arjun Guha-Thakurta
- Sanjeev Hazarika
- Baharul Islam
- Towfiq Rahman
