= Universal Music India =

Indian record label; imprint of Universal Music

Universal Music India Pvt. Ltd.
- Parent company: Universal Music Group
- Founded: November 16, 1999; 27 years ago
- Country of origin: India
- Location: Mumbai, Maharashtra

Universal Music India Pvt. Ltd. (UMI) was launched in 1999; it is a part of the Universal Music Group, an American-based, Dutch-listed multinational music corporation. Universal Music India is registered with the Indian Music Industry, a trust that represents the recording industry distributors in India. UMI appointed Devraj Sanyal as its managing director in 2011, succeeding Rajat Kakar, managing director of Universal Music India for the previous eight years. It is the successor to the music label Music India, which in turn was the successor to Polydor India Pvt. Ltd.; all albums released under both labels are currently under license of Universal Music India.

== Notable artists ==
- A. R. Rahman
- Anaida
- Arijit Singh
- Abhijeet Sawant
- Adnan Sami
- Alka Yagnik
- Ali Zafar
- Atif Aslam
- Amit Kumar
- Anindita Paul
- Anmoll Mallik
- Anup Jalota
- Asha Bhosle
- Asim Azhar
- Babul Supriyo
- Badshah, in partnership for the label 0075 Pentertainment
- Bally Sagoo
- Bhitali Das
- Bhupen Hazarika
- Bombay Rockers
- Bhupinder Singh
- Bohemia
- Boomarang
- Coshish
- Divine
- Euphoria
- Falguni Pathak
- Farhan Saeed
- Faakhir Mehmood
- Ghulam Ali
- Girish and The Chronicles
- Haroon
- Ikka Singh
- Indus Creed
- Jagjit Singh
- Jal The Band
- Jaz Dhami
- K.S. Chithra
- Kavita Krishnamurthy
- Kavita Seth
- Kishore Kumar
- Kumar Sanu
- Lata Mangeshkar
- Lesle Lewis
- Lost Stories
- Lucky Ali
- Mehnaz Hoosein
- Mohammed Rafi
- Nahid Afrin
- Nishtha Sharma
- Pandit Hariprasad Chaurasia
- Pandit Ram Narayan
- Pandit Ravi Shankar
- Pandit Shivkumar Sharma
- Pankaj Udhas
- Papon
- Parthiv Gohil
- Poorvi Koutish
- Rabbi Shergill
- Rahat Fateh Ali Khan
- Raja Kumari
- Sagarika
- Samved
- Shaan
- Shreya Ghoshal
- Sonu Nigam
- Tarali Sarma
- Udit Narayan
- Ustad Amjad Ali Khan
- Ustad Zakir Hussain
- Vipul Mehta
- Yasser Desai
- Yo Yo Honey Singh
- Zubeen Garg
- Zoe Viccaji

== Labels ==
=== Current ===
Label	Ref.
Def Jam India	
VYRL Originals	
VYRL South	
VYRL Punjabi	
VYRL Haryanvi	
VYRL Bhojpuri	
Indiea Records	
Oriental Star Agencies	
Zee Music Company	
Desi Melodies	
Five Star Audio	
Mad For Mussic	
Vedam Records	
Albuquerque Records

=== Defunct or absorbed ===
label	Notes
Music India	Absorbed To Universal Music India
Polygram	Absorbed To Universal Music India
Polydor	Absorbed To Universal Music India
EMI Records India	Changed The Name into VYRL Originals with Mohit Suri, due to long time agreement of HMV for Saregama
Virgin Records India	Absorbed to EMI Records India & changed The Name into VYRL Originals
Mass Appeal India	Became under The Orchard India By Sony Music India
Vishesh Films	Now under exclusive licence of Sony Music India

== Hindi films ==
Year	Film
1970s
1970	Bachpan
1970	Johnny Mera Naam
1970	Sachaa Jhutha
1970	The Train
1971	Badnam Farishte
1971	Balidaan
1971	Ek Bar Mooskura Do
1971	Gambler
1971	Johar Mehmood In Hong Kong
1971	Mera Gaon Mera Desh
1971	Nanhi Kaliyan
1971	Pasand Apni Apni
1971	Tere Mere Sapne
1972	Bhai Ho To Aisa
1972	Bijli
1972	Do Yaar
1972	Ek Nazar
1972	Farz Aur Pyar
1972	Ganga
1972	Jawani Diwani
1972	Lalkar
1972	Maanavata
1972	Parchhaiyan
1972	Pocket Maar
1972	Savera
1972	Tu Meri Main Tera
1973	Aa Gale Lag Jaa
1973	Andhi Jawani
1973	Archana
1973	Banarasi Babu
1973	Bindiya Aur Bandook
1973	Blackmail
1973	Do Shikari
1973	Gaddaar
1973	Geeta Mera Naam
1973	Heera
1973	Joshila
1973	Jurm Aur Sazaa
1973	Nafrat
1973	Suraj Aur Chanda
1975	Deewaar
1975	Julie
1975	Sholay
1979	Qurbani
1980s
1980	Commander
1980	Shaan
1980	Yaarana
1981	Ahista Ahista
1981	Apna Bana Lo
1981	Baseraa
1981	Desh Premee
1981	Ghungroo Ki Awaaz
1981	Hamari Bahu Alka
1981	Kaalia
1981	Kalyug
1981	Khara Khota
1981	Khush Naseeb
1981	Naseeb
1981	Partner
1981	Prem Geet
1981	Sanam Teri Kasam
1981	Satte Pe Satta
1981	Videsh
1981	Zamane Ko Dikhana Hai
1982	Subah
1982	Yeh Vaada Raha
1983	Dil Tujhko Diya
1983	Galiyon Kaa Badshah
1984	Jawaani
1985	Joshilaay
1985	Saagar
1986	Apne Apne
1986	Itihaas
1986	Janbaaz
1986	Muqaddar Ka Faisla
1986	Sadak Chhap
1986	Sutradhar
1990s
1994	Bombay
1994	Talaashi
1995	Ram Jaane
1995	Top Hero
1996	Ajay
1996	Khamoshi: The Musical
1997	Chirag
1998	Jhooth Bole Kauwa Kaate
1998	Maharaja
1998	Mother
1999	Kohram
1999	Pyaar Koi Khel Nahin
2000s
2000	Hey Ram
2000	Jis Desh Mein Ganga Rehta Hain
2000	Jungle
2001	Abhay
2001	Bas Itna Sa Khwaab Hai
2001	Chori Chori Chupke Chupke
2001	Indian
2001	Lajja
2002	Aankhen
2002	Aap Mujhe Achche Lagne Lage
2002	Devdas
2002	Sur
2003	Munna Bhai M.B.B.S.
2003	Chori Chori
2025	Param Sundari
2025	Uff Yeh Siyapaa
2025	Thamma
2026	Toaster
2026	I.I.Z - Indian Institute of Zombies
2026	Cocktail 2
2026	Pooja Meri Jaan
2026	Eetha

== Hindi non-films ==
Year	Album(s)	Artists(s)
1990s
1999	Aankhon Mein Tera Hi Chehra	Aryans
1999	Maine Payal Hai Chhankhai	Falguni Pathak
1999	Dil Chahe	Shiamak Davar
2000s
2000	Tanha Dil...	Shaan
2000	Yeh Hawa Kehti Hai Kya	Aryans
2000	Hey Ji Re	Bina Mistry
2000	Meri Chunnar Udd Udd Jaye	Falguni Pathak
2000	The Complete Bhupen Hazarika	Bhupen Hazarika
2000	UMI-10	Various Artists
2001	Dekha Hai Teri Aankhon Kho	Aryans
2001	Ek Hassina Thi	Various Artists
2001	Saawariya Teri Yaad Mein	Falguni Pathak
2001	Sunidhi C.	Sunidhi Chauhan
2002	UMI-10 Vol. 2	Various Artists
2002	Yeh Kisne Jaadu Kiya	Falguni Pathak

== Marathi films ==
Year	Film
2025	Devmanus

== Bengali films ==
Year	Film
2004	Shudhu Tumi

== Assamese films ==
Year	Film
2006	Adhinayak
2014	Mahapurush

== Location ==
Its head office in Bandra East, Mumbai, oversees the company's interests in Bangladesh, Sri Lanka and Pakistan, in addition to India.

== See also ==
- List of record labels
- List of Universal Music Group artists
