= Nayak (2001 Assamese film) =

- Directed by: Munin Barua
- Screenplay by: Munin Barua
- Produced by: Merry Laskar (Pooja Motion Pictures)
- Starring: Jatin Bora; Zerifa Wahid; Ravi Sarma; Parineeta Borthakur
- Cinematography: Mrinal Kanti Das
- Edited by: A. Sreekar Prasad
- Music by: Zubeen Garg
- Release date: 30 November 2001
- Running time: 185 mins (Extended Uncut release); 183 mins (Theatrical release); 170 min (DVD release)
- Country: India
- Language: Assamese

Nayak is a 2001 Indian Assamese romantic drama movie directed by Munin Barua and produced under the banner of Pooja Motion Pictures. Music was composed by Zubeen Garg. The film was released on 30 November 2001.

== Cast ==
- Jatin Bora as Abinash Choudhary
- Ravi Sarma as Anupam
- Zerifa Wahid as Borosha
- Parineeta Borthakur as Jonali
- Hiranya Das as Hemanta Saikia
- Purabi Sarma
- Jayanta Das
- Rina Bora
- Rajib Goswami
- Arun Hazarika
- Indra Bania (guest appearance)

== Soundtrack ==
Nayak

Soundtrack album by Zubeen Garg
- Released: 21 June 2001
- Genre: Feature film soundtrack
- Language: Assamese
- Labels: Pooja Motion Pictures; NK Production; Wave Music
- Producer: Merry Laskar

Zubeen Garg chronology
Sesh Upahar (2000)	Nayak (2001)	Prem Aru Prem (2001)

The music of Nayak was composed by Zubeen Garg. Lyrics were penned by Hemanta Dutta, Zubeen Garg and Diganta Kalita. The singers who lent their voices in this film are Zubeen Garg, Mahalakshmi Iyer, Shashwati Phukan, Arnab Chakrabarty, Shaan and Pamela Jain. The album contains 7 tracks and all were superhit. The song "Lahe Lahe" was later reused as "Shure Shure Gaan Holo" in Shudhu Tumi (2004).

Tracklist
No.	Title	Lyrics	Artist(s)	Length
1.	"Motoliya Botahe"	Hemanta Dutta	Zubeen Garg, Mahalakshmi Iyer	5:14
2.	"Lahe Lahe"	Diganta Bharati	Zubeen Garg, Shashwati Phukan	5:00
3.	"Monote Nu Aaji"	Zubeen Garg	Zubeen Garg, Arnab Chakrabarty	4:34
4.	"Kinu Khuria"	Hemanta Dutta	Zubeen Garg, Pamela Jain	4:50
5.	"Nayak Hobo Khuji"	Hemanta Dutta	Zubeen Garg	5:44
6.	"Mon Gahanat"	Zubeen Garg	Shaan, Pamela Jain, Zubeen Garg	5:39
7.	"(Theme) Nayak"	Zubeen Garg	Zubeen Garg	2:55
