= Raghav (2023 film) =

- Theatrical release poster
- Directed by: Jatin Bora
- Written by: Abhijit Bhattacharya
- Screenplay by: Abhijit Bhattacharya
- Produced by: Jatin Bora; Navanita Sharma Bora
- Starring: Jatin Bora; Mridula Baruah; Nishita Goswami; Hiranya Deka; Sumi Borah
- Cinematography: Pradip Daimary
- Music by: Zubeen Garg
- Release date: 27 October 2023
- Running time: 118 mins
- Country: India
- Language: Assamese
- Budget: 2.5 Crore
- Box office: 3 Crore

Raghav is an Indian Assamese-language action film produced by JB Production and directed by Jatin Bora. The film's cast includes Jatin Bora, Nishita Goswami, Mridula Boruah, Hiranya Deka and Sumi Borah. It was released on 27 October 2023. However, It flopped in the box office.

== Plot ==
Raghav, a taxi driver by profession, is a complex and tragic figure. He is a man who loves and cares deeply for his mother and younger brother, even though they hate him for reasons unknown to him. Despite their rejection, Raghav never fails to provide for them, sacrificing everything he has for their well-being. His unwavering devotion to his family, despite their hatred, keeps him committed rarely pursuing the answers he craves for.

== Cast ==
- Jatin Bora as Raghav
- Mridula Baruah
- Hiranya Deka
- Nishita Goswami
- Bibhuti Bhushan Hazarika
- Chinmoy Kataki
- Jivittesh Mazumdar
- Sumi Borah
- Rajiv Rajneesh

== Production ==
Raghav was made under the banner of JB Production and directed by Jatin Bora.

== Release ==
The film was released on 27 October 2023.

== Soundtracks ==
Raghav

Soundtrack album by Zubeen Garg
- Recorded: 2022–2023
- Genre: Feature film soundtrack
- Length: 8:18
- Label: Dhwani Records

Zubeen Garg chronology
The Slambook (2023)	Raghav (2023)	Sikaar (2024)

All songs of this film were composed by Zubeen Garg.

Lyrics were written by Diganta Bharati, Rahul Gautam, and Zubeen Garg.

Bollywood singer Mahalakshmi Iyer returned to the Assamese film industry after a gap of eight years.

It marked their final collaboration between Zubeen Garg and Jatin Bora before Garg died 2 years later on 19 September 2025.

Tracklists
No.	Title	Singer(s)	Length
1.	"Maa"	Zubeen Garg, Shanta Uzir	4:20
2.	"Sari Soka"	Zubeen Garg	3:58
3.	"Silmil Tupanite"	Zubeen Garg, Mahalakshmi Iyer	4:45
4.	"Sari Soka" (Film Version)	Zubeen Garg, Prabin Borah	3:58

== See also ==
- List of Assamese films
