= Scam 2019 =

Indian Assamese webseries

- Screenplay by: Bhaskar Deka
- Story by: Aabhijeet Sharma
- Directed by: RK
- Starring: Jatin Bora; Bibhuti Bhushan Hazarika; Maytrayee Goswami; Manik Roy; Yankee Parasar; RK
- Music by: Rideep Das
- Country of origin: India
- Original language: Assamese

Production
- Producer: Aabhijeet Sharma
- Cinematography: Bitul Das
- Editor: Jhulan Krishna Mahanta
- Production company: Red Cinemas

Original release
- Release: 27 June 2025

Scam 2019 is an Indian Assamese webseries streaming on Red Cinemas OTT App. The series stars Jatin Bora in the lead role, is directed by RK and produced by Aabhijeet Sharma.

It stars Jatin Bora as the protagonist Aabhijeet Sharma, with Bibhuti Bhushan Hazarika appearing in a negative role. The series also features Maytrayee Goswami, Manik Roy, Yankee Parasar and RK in pivotal roles. The series is based on a senior government official, who was accused of fraudulently including the names of illegal immigrants in the updated NRC.

== Cast ==
- Jatin Bora as Aabhijeet Sharma
- Bibhuti Bhushan Hazarika as Director
- Maytrayee Goswami as Kalpana
- Manik Roy as Niloy Seal
- Yankee Parasar as Sukanya Baruah
- RK as Ranjeev Kakati
- Hiemakshi Borah as Pranjana Kashyap
- Sidharth Roy as Sheikh
- Bhabesh Das as Mr Bhuyan
- Arsana Pujari as Mrs Bhuyan
- Mobidul Islam as Mr Borthakur
- Parnali Sharma as Mrs Borthakur
- Naba Jyoti Mahanta as Rahmat
- Diganta Bhattacharya as Nilotpal Hazarika
- Mridul Sharma as Bacardi Sharma
- Spandan Barthakur as Samujjal Bhattacharya
- Nipu as Abhay
- Betal as Ajay
- Mirza Arif Hazarika as Arif
- Babu Das as Chotu

== Episodes ==
=== Episode 1 - Hukum ke Ghulam ===
Director joins his new office. Sharma sees a ray of hope after years of battle.

=== Episode 2 - The Transition Time ===
As Sharma digs deeper, he unveils new truths about the Director.

=== Episode 3 - Dilli Dil se Dur Nahi ===
Sharma goes to Delhi to apologize in front of the magistrate as he is termed as a political agent by the Director.

=== Episode 4 - The War is Always On ===
While the Director has fled, Sharma is left all alone in this battle of truth and deception.

== Production and release ==
The principal shoot of the series kickstarted in January 2024, soon after the announcement of the series. The teaser of the series was unveiled on 29 October 2024, and the official trailer on 6 June 2025, through the YouTube channel of Red Cinemas 18+. Although the makers claimed the series to be based on a fictional story, The Hindu stated that "the trailer indicates it is closer to reality than fiction".

On 6 June 2025, the makers launched a new OTT App and announced that the series would premiere directly through the streaming platform on 27 June 2025. The official release through its OTT platform Red Cinemas, consists of four episodes, being released in Assamese with English subtitles.
