= Bhaimon Da =

Indian Assamese biographical film

- Official poster
- ভাইমন দা
- Directed by: Sasanka Samir
- Written by: Sasanka Samir
- Screenplay by: Sasanka Samir
- Produced by: Shyamantak Gautam; Anupam Sarma
- Starring: Bondip Sharma; Yashshree Bhuyan; Partha Pratim Hazarika; Arghadeep Baruah; Nirupam Saikia; Nilim Dutta; Kaushik Bhardwaj
- Cinematography: Vanchinathan Murugesan
- Edited by: Protim Khaound
- Music by: Zubeen Garg; Poran Borkatoky
- Production company: Zeal Creations
- Release date: 23 May 2025 (India)
- Country: India
- Language: Assamese
- Budget: ₹6 crore
- Box office: 14.31 crore

Bhaimon Da is an Assamese biographical film directed and written by Sasanka Samir. The film was released in 2025, starring Bondip Sarma, Yashshree Bhuyan, Partha Pratim Hazarika, Nirupam Saikia, Nilim Dutta and Arghadeep Barua in prominent roles. Produced by Shyamantak Gautam and Anupam Sarmah under the banner of Zeal Creations, the story is based on the life of noted Assamese filmmaker Munin Barua.

== Story ==
Bhaimon Da narrates the life and works of Assamese filmmaker, script-writer Munin Barua. The film explores his life from his youth to the final days, simultaneously presenting some of the real challenges faced by Assamese cinema industry during his time.

== Cast ==
- Bondip Sarma as Munin Barua (Bhaimon da)
  - Anurag Bora as young Munin Barua
- Yashshree Bhuyan as Manjula Barua
- Gitratha Sharma as Manas Baruah (Rijjo)
- Arghadeep Baruah as Manjyoti Barua
- Nirupam Saikia as Tapobrat Barua (Vekuda)
- Nilim Dutta as Biju Phukan
- Kaushik Bhardwaj as Jatin Bora
- Gunakar Deb Goswami as Hemendra Nath Barua
- Pakiza Begum as Latika Barua
- Boibhabi Goswami as Mridula Baruah
- Deepjyoti Keot as Suman Dowarah
- Partha Pratim Hazarika as Zubeen Garg
- Ashish Vidyarthi as N.P.N Nayar
- Harpal Saikia
- Raju Roy as Jayanta Hazarika
- Rajdeep Hazarika
- Ujjal Kumar
- Kalpana Kalita as Vidya Rao
- Samudragupta Dutta as Shiva Prasad Thakur
- Jay Saikia as Ravi Sarma
- Sanjeev Buragohain
- Himani Kalita
- Shilpi Sikha Bora as Moromi

== Production ==
A poster launch event and music release ceremony was held on 7 October 2024 at the Rudra Barua Hall, Jyotichitraban, Guwahati. Along with it, a live painting session was also organized to pay tribute to Munin Barua as part of the inauguration ceremony.

== Marketing and promotion ==
The official trailer for Bhaimon Da was released on YouTube by Zeal Creations, announcing that the film would hit theaters on 23 May 2025.

== Release ==
The film was released in theaters on 23 May 2025 and received favorable reviews from critics and audiences.
