= MZQ =

MZQ, MzQ or mzq may refer to:

- MzQ Digital, a company co-founded by Adithya Srinivasan
- Majgaon railway station, Majgaon, Assam, India (station code: MZQ)
- Mori Atas language, an Austronesian language spoken in Sulawesi, Indonesia (ISO-639-3: mzq)
- Mkuze Airport, Mkuze, South Africa (IATA: MZQ)
