= Mahalakshmi Iyer =

Indian singer (born 1976)

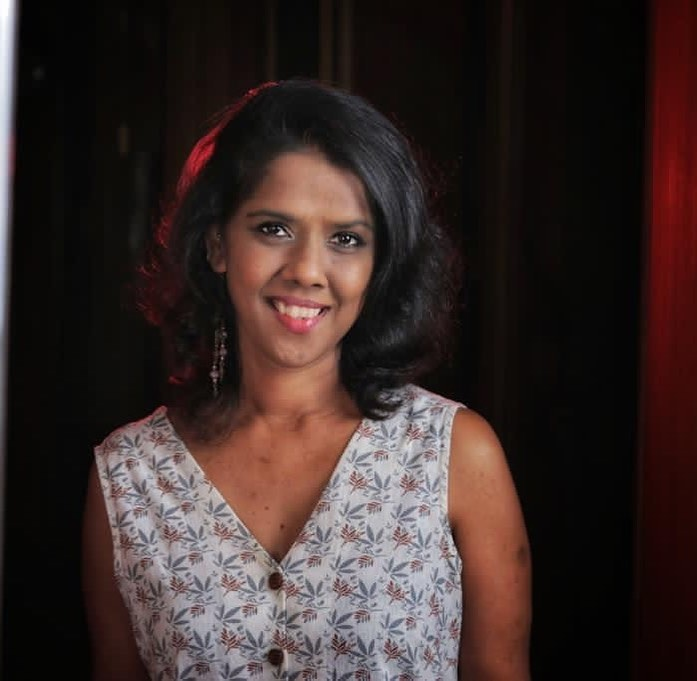
- Born: 11 July 1976 (age 50); Bombay, Maharashtra, India
- Education: Ramniranjan Anandilal Podar College of Commerce and Economics; St. Xavier's College, Mumbai
- Occupation: Singer
- Musical career
- Genres: Playback singing, Indian classical music, folk, Indipop
- Instrument: Vocalist
- Years active: 1996–present

Mahalakshmi Iyer (born 11 July 1976) is an Indian playback singer known for her contributions to Hindi, Assamese and Tamil film music. She has also recorded songs in several other Indian languages, including Telugu, Marathi, Bengali, Odia, Gujarati and Kannada. Shortly after completing her graduation, she began her professional career by lending her voice to advertising jingles. Although she recorded her first song in 1997 for the unreleased film Dus with the composer trio Shankar–Ehsaan–Loy, her first officially released film song came in 1998 with A. R. Rahman in Dil Se... Over the years, she has recorded approximately 5,000 songs, working with many leading composers across the Indian film industry.

Mahalakshmi was one of the lead vocalists in the song “Jai Ho” from the film Slumdog Millionaire (2008). For this track, she shared the Grammy Award for Best Song Written for a Motion Picture at the 52nd Grammy Awards held on 31 January 2010. The same song also received the Academy Award for Best Original Song at the 81st Academy Awards. Throughout her career, she has received several accolades, including the Maharashtra State Film Award for Best Female Playback Singer, the Orissa State Film Award for Best Singer, the Gujarat State Film Award for Best Playback Singer, the Gujarati Iconic Film Award (GIFA) for Best Playback Singer, and the Filmfare Award Assamese for Best Playback Singer in 2024.

In addition to her work in film music, she has collaborated with international artists such as Michel Sanchez and Éric Mouquet on the project, Deep Forest. She has also released Indie singles and continues to perform extensively in live concerts worldwide, frequently touring with prominent composers such as A. R. Rahman, Shankar–Ehsaan–Loy, Vishal-Shekhar, Jatin–Lalit and Zubeen Garg.

== Early life ==
Mahalakshmi Iyer was born on July 11, 1976, in Mumbai, Maharashtra, into a Tamil-speaking Iyer family. Her mother is a Carnatic classical singer, which greatly influenced Mahalakshmi’s early musical upbringing. She began her formal training in Hindustani classical music at a young age, alongside her two sisters. Much of her childhood was spent in the Chembur neighborhood of Mumbai. She completed her undergraduate studies in Economics at RA Podar College of Arts and Commerce and later attended St. Xavier’s College, both located in Mumbai.

Mahalakshmi began her professional career in music with her first jingle assignment for Optex Sarees. She subsequently established herself in the advertising industry, lending her voice to numerous campaigns for major brands such as Close-up, Nescafé, Johnson's Baby Soap, Uncle Chipps, Amul, Pepsi, Cadbury Dairy Milk, among many others.

== Career ==
Mahalakshmi made her playback debut with the film Dus in 1997, but the film was never completed and remained unreleased due to the sudden passing of the film's director Mukul S. Anand. The album however was released in 1999 as a tribute. She sang the track Ae Ajnabee with Udit Narayan for A. R. Rahman in Mani Ratnam's Dil Se.. which was her first release as a playback singer and considered to be her debut. Mahalakshmi continued singing for Shankar–Ehsaan–Loy and A.R. Rahman in many films which followed.

Since then she has also sung many serials, jingles, and original albums. She was part of several successful soundtracks such as Mission Kashmir, Yaadein and Saathiya and worked with some of the biggest music composers like A. R. Rahman, Shankar–Ehsaan–Loy, Vishal–Shekhar, Nadeem–Shravan, Jatin–Lalit and more.

She has sung for many Yash Raj Films' biggest hits like Dhoom 2, Bunty Aur Babli, Salaam Namaste, Fanaa, Ta Ra Rum Pum and Jhoom Barabar Jhoom.

She was known for her performances in songs like "Kabhi Sham Dhale" from Sur – The Melody of Life (2002), "Har Taraf" from Rishtey (2002) and for hit songs like "Chup Chup Ke" from Bunty Aur Babli (2005), "Aaj Ki Raat" from Don: The Chase Begins Again (2006) and "Bol Na Halke Halke" from Jhoom Barabar Jhoom.

She sang on the Academy Award-winning song "Jai Ho" for A. R. Rahman in the film Slumdog Millionaire (2008). Specifically, she sang the Hindi words between the short "Jai Ho" chants, as well as portions of the verses (most of which were sung by Sukhwinder Singh).

In the past, she rendered background vocal to the very famous Ghazal of Pankaj Udhas named Aur Ahistaa. She has also rendered her voice to many private album remixes notably Aaja Piya Tohe Pyar and Baahon Mein Chali Aao, which was originally rendered by the legendary Lata Mangeshkar.

== Discography ==
=== Film songs ===
==== Hindi ====
Year	Song	Film	Music director	Co-singer(s)
1997	"Suno Gaur Se Duniya Walo (Hindustani)"	Dus	Shankar–Ehsaan–Loy	Udit Narayan, Shankar Mahadevan, Dominique Cerejo
1998	"Ae Ajnabee"	Dil Se..	A. R. Rahman	Udit Narayan
1999	"Tumne Na Humse"	Pyaar Mein Kabhi Kabhi	Vishal–Shekhar	Solo
1999	"Dil Se Mere"	Pyaar Mein Kabhi Kabhi	Vishal–Shekhar	Shekhar Ravjiani
1999	"Dillagi Dillagi"	Dillagi	Shankar–Ehsaan–Loy	Kavita Krishnamurthy, Alka Yagnik, Abhijeet, Udit Narayan, Sonu Nigam, Sukhwinder Singh, Shankar Mahadevan, Shaan, Jaspinder Narula
1999	"Kya Yeh Sach Hai"	Dillagi	Shankar–Ehsaan–Loy	Shankar Mahadevan
2000	"So Jaa Chandaa"	Mission Kashmir	Loy Mendonsa	Solo
2001	"Chalti Hai Purvaai"	Rahul	Anu Malik	Alka Yagnik
2001	"Hasde Hasde"	Abhay	Shankar–Ehsaan–Loy	Kamal Haasan
2001	"Naani Maa" (Lori)	Moksha	Rajesh Roshan	Solo
2001	"Yaar Teri Bewafai"	Love You Hamesha	A. R. Rahman	Solo
2001	"Yaadein Yaad Aati Hai"	Yaadein	Anu Malik	Sunidhi Chauhan
2002	"Har Taraf Tu Hai"	Rishtey	Sanjeev Darshan	Shaan
2002	"Chalka Chalka Re"	Saathiya	A. R. Rahman	Richa Sharma, Vaishali Samant
2002	"Yeh Taazgi Yeh Saadgi"	Deewangee	Ismail Darbar	KK
2002	"Kabhie Sham Dhale"	Sur – The Melody of Life	M. M. Kreem	Solo
2002	"Oohh Yeah"	Yeh Kya Ho Raha Hai?	Shankar–Ehsaan–Loy	KK
2003	"Aao Milke Gaayen Aisa Gaana"	Armaan	Shankar–Ehsaan–Loy	Shankar Mahadevan, Udit Narayan, Amitabh Bachchan
2003	"Main Gaaon"	Armaan	Shankar–Ehsaan–Loy	Udit Narayan, Shaan
2003	"Tere Ishq Mein"	Supari	Vishal–Shekhar	Vishal Dadlani
2003	"Jab Kabhi"	Jhankaar Beats	Vishal–Shekhar	KK
2003	"Mera Mann"	Nayee Padosan	Shankar-Ehsaan-Loy	Solo
2003	"Chori Nahi Kee"	Nayee Padosan	Shankar-Ehsaan-Loy	Shankar Mahadevan
2003	"Rang De Rang De"	Nayee Padosan	Shankar-Ehsaan-Loy	Babul Supriyo, Shaan
2003	"Mujhe Tumse Muhabbat Hai"	Qayamat: City Under Threat	Nadeem Shravan	Kumar Sanu
2003	"Mera Dil Dil Toh Lele"	Qayamat: City Under Threat	Nadeem Shravan	Shaan
2003	"ABBG"	Kuch Naa Kaho	Shankar–Ehsaan–Loy	Udit Narayan
2003	"Baat Meri Suniye"	Kuch Naa Kaho	Shankar–Ehsaan–Loy	Shankar Mahadevan
2004	"Yeh Dhuaan"	Charas	Raju Singh	Solo
2004	"Kuchh To Ho Raha Hai"	Shaadi Ka Laddoo	Vishal–Shekhar	Shaan
2004	"Tum Kaho To"	Shaadi Ka Laddoo	Vishal–Shekhar	Udit Narayan
2004	"Pyar Mein Sau Uljhane Hai"	Kyun! Ho Gaya Na...	Shankar–Ehsaan–Loy	Shankar Mahadevan, Vijay Prakash, Sneha Pant
2004	"Ishq Khudai"	Rudraksh	Shankar–Ehsaan–Loy	Krishna, Shankar Mahadevan, Shweta Pandit
2004	"Abhi Nahi Aur Kabhi"	Stop!	Vishal–Shekhar	Shaan, Sunidhi Chauhan, Sowmya Raoh
2005	"Chup Chup Ke"	Bunty Aur Babli	Shankar–Ehsaan–Loy	Sonu Nigam
2005	"Miraksam"	Waqt: The Race Against Time	Anu Malik	Sudesh Bhosle, Sonu Nigam, Sunidhi Chauhan
2005	"Koi Aisa Alam"	Karam	Vishal–Shekhar	Sonu Nigam
2005	"Tu Jahaan"	Salaam Namaste	Vishal–Shekhar	Sonu Nigam
2005	"Jaaniya Ve"	Dus	Vishal–Shekhar	Hariharan
2005	"Dil Ke Arma Tarse"	Aanch	Sanjeev Darshan	Sonu Nigam
2005	"Koi Aisa Alam"	Karam	Vishal–Shekhar	Sonu Nigam
2006	"I'm in Love"	Neal 'n' Nikki	Salim–Sulaiman	Sonu Nigam
2006	"Dil Laga Na"	Dhoom 2	Pritam	Jolly Mukherjee, Suzanne D'Mello, Sukhbir
2006	"Aaj Ki Raat"	Don: The Chase Begins Again	Shankar–Ehsaan–Loy	Alisha Chinai, Sonu Nigam
2006	"Des Rangila"	Fanaa	Jatin–Lalit	Solo
2006	"Chanda Chamke"	Fanaa	Jatin–Lalit	Babul Supriyo
2006	"Rock N' Roll Soniye"	Kabhi Alvida Naa Kehna	Shankar–Ehsaan–Loy	Shaan, Shankar Mahadevan
2007	"Bol Na Halke Halke"	Jhoom Barabar Jhoom	Shankar–Ehsaan–Loy	Rahat Fateh Ali Khan
2007	"Jhoom Barabar Jhoom"	Jhoom Barabar Jhoom	Shankar–Ehsaan–Loy	Shankar Mahadevan, KK, Sukhwinder Singh
2007	"Baat Pakki"	Just Married	Pritam	Shaan, Sukhwinder Singh
2007	"Jab Chhaye"	Hattrick	Pritam	Solo
2007	"Zara Gungunalein"	Laaga Chunari Mein Daag	Shantanu Moitra	Babul Supriyo
2007	"Tenu Leke"	Salaam-e-Ishq: A Tribute to Love	Shankar–Ehsaan–Loy	Sonu Nigam
2007	"Ta Ra Rum Pum"	Ta Ra Rum Pum	Vishal–Shekhar	Shaan
2007	"Teri Yaadein"	Kaisay Kahein...	Pritam	Sukhwinder Singh
2008	"Jai Ho"	Slumdog Millionaire	A. R. Rahman	Sukhwinder Singh, Vijay Prakash, Tanvi Shah
2008	"Gup Chup"	One Two Three	Raghav Sachar	Raghav Sachar
2008	"Jo Gumshuda"	Mission Istaanbul	Anu Malik	Shaan, Ege
2008	"Oh Ho Sanam"	Dasavathaaram (D)	Himesh Reshammiya	Shaan
2008	"Falak Tak Chal"	Tashan	Vishal–Shekhar	Udit Narayan
2008	"Mera Vaada Raha"	Deshdrohi	Nikhil-Vinay	Udit Narayan
2008	"Pyar Ki Dastan"	Luck by Chance	Shankar–Ehsaan–Loy	Amit Paul
2009	"Mujh Jaisa Hero"	Love Khichdi	Pritam	Gopal Rao
2009	"Maza Aa Gaya"	Victory	Anu Malik	Sonu Nigam, Suresh Wadkar, Sudesh Bhosle, Sumitra Iyer, Altaf Raja
2010	"Sadka Kiya"	I Hate Luv Storys	Vishal–Shekhar	Suraj Jagan
2010	"Chal Chal Bhosle Market"	Khichdi: The Movie	Raju Singh	Shaan
2010	"Tera Mera Pyar"	Action Replayy	Pritam	Karthik
2010	"Charha De Rang"	Yamla Pagla Deewana	Nouman Javaid	Ali Pervez Mehdi, Shweta Pandit, Rahul Seth
2011	"Laung da Lashkara" (orig&remix)	Patiala House	Shankar–Ehsaan–Loy	Hard Kaur, Jassi Sidhu
2011	"Rola Pe Gaya" (orig & remix)	Patiala House	Shankar–Ehsaan–Loy	Shankar Mahadevan, Hard Kaur, Earl
2011	"Mauka" (orig & remix)	Aarakshan	Shankar–Ehsaan–Loy	Raman Mahadevan, Tarun Sagar, Gaurav Gupta, Rehan Khan
2012	"Bechayan Sapne"	Chittagong	Shankar–Ehsaan–Loy	Abhijeet Sawant, Gulraj Singh, Sameer Khan, Shankar Mahadevan
2012	"Khud Ko Tere"	1920: Evil Returns	Chirantan Bhatt	Solo
2012	"Meri Duniya Terey Dam Se"	Delhi Safari	Shankar–Ehsaan–Loy	Shekhar Ravjiani, Shivam Mahadevan
2014	"Concert Song"	2 States	Shankar–Ehsaan–Loy	Solo
2014	"Do Akhiyyan"	Badlapur Boys	Sachin Gupta	Shaan
2014	"Nakhriley"	Kill Dil	Shankar–Ehsaan–Loy	Ali Zafar, Shankar Mahadevan, Gulzar
2015	"Dooriyan"	I Love Desi	Sham Balkar	Javed Ali, Sonu Kakkar
2018	"Heer"	Baa Baaa Black Sheep	Gourav-Roshin-Shaan	Mika Singh
2019	"Beimani Se"	Gone Kesh	Bishakh Jyoti	Solo

==== Assamese ====
Year	Song	Film(s)	Composer	Lyricist	Co-singer(s)	Ref.
1999	"Morome Bisare Aaji"	Bukur Majot Jole	Monoj Kashyap	Monoj Kashyap	Solo	
1999	"Morom Nodir Gabharu Ghat"	Morom Nodir Gabharu Ghat	Atul Medhi	Zubeen Garg	Zubeen Garg	
1999	"Bukure Bhakha Mor Buji Nopowane"	Morom Nodir Gabharu Ghat	Atul Medhi	Zubeen Garg	Zubeen Garg	
2001	"Motoliya Botahe"	Nayak	Zubeen Garg	Zubeen Garg	Solo	
2001	"Lahe Lahe"	Nayak	Zubeen Garg	Zubeen Garg	Zubeen Garg, Shashwati Phukan	
2001	"Kinu Xuria"	Nayak	Zubeen Garg	Zubeen Garg	Zubeen Garg, Pamela Jain	
2001	"Mon Gahanot"	Nayak	Zubeen Garg	Zubeen Garg	Zubeen Garg, Shaan, Pamela Jain, Sagarika	
2002	"Sokuwe Sokuwe Sinaki"	Prem Aru Prem	Zubeen Garg	Zubeen Garg	Bobita Sharma, Zubeen Garg, Jonkey Borthakur, Sagarika	
2002	"Ui Guthibo Jaanene"	Kanyadaan	Zubeen Garg	Manas Robin	Zubeen Garg, Shaswati Phukan	
2002	"Phul Golapore"	Priya O' Priya	Manas Robin	Manas Robin	Jitul Sonowal, Dilip Das	
2002	"Ei Ghar Amar"	Jibon Nodir Duti Paar	Zubeen Garg	Zubeen Garg	Zubeen Garg, Shaan, Sagarika, Arnab Chakrabarty, Jonkey Borthakur	
2002	"Kokal Khamusiya"	Jibon Nodir Duti Paar	Zubeen Garg	Zubeen Garg	Zubeen Garg	
2004	"Rong Tumi Huane"	Rong	Zubeen Garg	Zubeen Garg	Solo	
2004	"Gun Gun Gun Koi"	Hridoy Kopowa Gaan	Jayanta Nath	Zubeen Garg	Solo	
2011	"Poita Bhaat"	Poley Poley Urey Mon	Timothy Das Hanse, Biman Baruah		Zubeen Garg, Chayanika Bhuyan	
2012	"Xamayor Lagote"	Ekhon Nedekha Nodir Xhipare	Zubeen Garg	Bidyut Kotoky	Solo	
2015	"Xapun Namise Suwa"	Khel - The Game	Dhruba Jyoti Phukon	Zubeen Garg	Solo	
2016	"Xaliki Puwar"	Gaane Ki Aane	Zubeen Garg	Zubeen Garg	Solo	
2017	"Dure Dure Tumi"	Nijaanor Gaan	Jatin Sharma	Rajdweep	Siddharth Hazarika	
2023	"Silmil Tuponite"	Raghav	Zubeen Garg		Zubeen Garg	
2025	"Era Eri"	Bhaimon Da	Zubeen Garg		Zubeen Garg, Amritprava Mahanta	

==== Tamil ====
Year	Film	Song	Composer(s)	Co-artist(s)
1998	Poonthottam	"Meethaatha Oru Veenai"	Ilaiyaraaja	Hariharan
1999	Jodi	"Velli Malarae"	A. R. Rahman	S. P. Balasubrahmanyam
1999	Jodi	"Vanna Poongavai"	A. R. Rahman	Srinivas
1999	Mudhalvan	"Kurukku Siruthhavale"	A. R. Rahman	Hariharan
2000	Alai Payuthey	"Yaaro Yaarodi"	A. R. Rahman	Vaishali Samant, Richa Sharma
2000	Hey Ram	"Pollatha Madhana"	Ilaiyaraaja	Anupama Deshpande
2000	Kandukondain Kandukondain	"Kandukonden Kandukonden"	A. R. Rahman	Hariharan
2000	Priyamaanavale	"Ennavo Ennavo"	S. A. Rajkumar	Hariharan
2000	Priyamaanavale	"Enakoru Snegidhi"	S. A. Rajkumar	Hariharan
2001	Dheena	"Nee Illai Endraal"	Yuvan Shankar Raja	Bhavatharini
2001	Aalavandhan	"Siri Siri"	Shankar–Ehsaan–Loy	Kamal Haasan
2001	12B	"Poove Vai Pesum"	Harris Jayaraj	Harish Raghavendra
2001	12B	"Mutham Mutham"	Harris Jayaraj	KK
2001	Narasimha	"Kadhal Aararo"	Mani Sharma	Saisivan
2001	Vedham	"Malai Kattru Vandhu"	Vidhyasagar	Hariharan
2001	Chocklet	"Dhuryodhana Dhuryodhana"	Deva	Shankar Mahadevan
2001	Chocklet	"Kappaleh Kappaleh"	Deva	Hariharan
2002	Aasai Aasaiyai	"Kannam Sivakka"	Mani Sharma	Ranjith
2002	King	"Achuvellam Pacharisi"	Dhina	Shankar Mahadevan
2002	Ragasiyam (D)	"Paarvaiyal Paavaiye"	Nadeem-Shravan	
2002	Ragasiyam (D)	"Anbin Uruvam"	Nadeem-Shravan	Balram
2002	Ragasiyam (D)	"Onnu Pola"	Nadeem-Shravan	Balram
2002	Ragasiyam (D)	"Shanti Shanti Than"	Nadeem-Shravan	Jolly Mukherjee
2002	Ragasiyam (D)	"En Mugam"	Nadeem-Shravan	Vijay Prakash
2002	Pammal K. Sambandam	"Gadothkaja"	Deva	Srinivas
2002	Pammal K. Sambandam	"Dindukallu Poota"	Deva	Shankar Mahadevan
2002	Raja	"Chinna Chinna"	S. A. Rajkumar	
2002	Raja	"Oru Pouranami"	S. A. Rajkumar	Hariharan
2002	Red	"November Madham"	Deva	Hariharan
2003	Alaudin	"Goyyaka"	Mani Sharma	Karthik
2003	Dum	"Polladha Padava"	Deva	KK
2003	Jay Jay	"Pengal Nenjai"	Bharadwaj	KK
2003	Priyamaana Thozhi	"Rojakkale"	S. A. Rajkumar	
2003	Success	"Marathi Kutti"	Deva	KK
2003	Thennavan	"Vinodhane Vinodhane"	Yuvan Shankar Raja	Srinivas
2003	Vaseegara	"Nenjam Oru Murai"	S. A. Rajkumar	Srinivas
2003	Winner	"Mudhal Murai"	Yuvan Shankar Raja	Srinivas
2004	Jai	"Kanna Simittina"	Mani Sharma	Karthik
2004	Kuthu	"Assana Assana"	Srikanth Deva	Zubeen Garg
2005	Daas	"Vaa Vaa"	Yuvan Shankar Raja	Shankar Mahadevan
2005	Kanda Naal Mudhal	"Koo Koovena"	Yuvan Shankar Raja	Karthik, Harish Raghavendra
2006	Madrasi	"Vidamatten Vidamatten"	D. Imman	
2006	Vettaiyaadu Vilaiyaadu	"Uyirilae Enadhu"	Harris Jayaraj	Srinivas
2006	Dhoom 2 (D)	"Kadal Kadal Thedi"	Pritam	Gopal Rao, Jolly Mukherjee, Suzanne D'Mello, Vijay Prakash
2007	Agaram	"Unnai Naan Paarthen"	Yuvan Shankar Raja	
2007	Kanna	"Thullum"	Ranjit Barot	Balaraman
2007	Machakaaran	"Vayasu Ponnukku"	Yuvan Shankar Raja	
2007	Mirugam	"Vaargona Vaargona"	Sabesh–Murali	
2007	Thavam	"Kannadasa Kannadasa"	D. Imman	
2007	Thavam	"Kannadasa"(Reprsie)	D. Imman	Sudha Ragunathan
2007	Unnale Unnale	"Mudhal Naal Indru"	Harris Jayaraj	KK
2008	Dasavathaaram	"Oh Ho Sanam"	Himesh Reshammiya	Kamal Haasan
2008	Dasavathaaram	"Oh Ho Sanam - remix"	Himesh Reshammiya	Himesh Reshammiya
2010	Bale Pandiya	"Aaradha Kobamillai"	Devan Ekambaram	Raman Mahadevan
2012	Maattrraan	"Kaal Mulaitha Poove"	Harris Jayaraj	Javed Ali
2013	Dhoom 3 (D)	"Mayanga (Malang)"	Pritam	Abhishek Nailwal
2015	Rajinimurugan	"Un Maele Oru Kannu"	D. Imman	Jithin Raj
2016	Thirunaal	"Ore Oru Vaanam"	Srikanth Deva	Shakthisree Gopalan
2019	Manikarnika: The Queen of Jhansi (D)	"Koamaanae"	Shankar–Ehsaan–Loy	Shriram Iyer
2019	Manikarnika: The Queen of Jhansi (D)	"Nanjukku"	Shankar–Ehsaan–Loy	Hamsika Iyer, Siddharth Mahadevan

==== Telugu ====
Year	Movie	Song	Composer(s)	Writer(s)	Co-artist(s)
1999	Oke Okkadu (D)	"Nelluri Nerajana"	A. R. Rahman		
2000	Ammo! Okato Tareekhu	"Nee Aakupacha"	Vandemataram Srinivas		
2000	Azad	"Kala Anuko Kaladanuko"	Mani Sharma		
2000	Choosoddaam Randi	"Anda Linda Brahmanda"	M. M. Keeravani		
2000	Choosoddaam Randi	"Dumuvulu"	M. M. Keeravani		
2000	Priyuralu Pilichindi (D)	"Thongi Choose"	A. R. Rahman		
2000	Sakutumba Saparivaara Sametam	"Pachi Venna Thechi"	S. V. Krishna Reddy		
2000	Sardukupodaam Randi	"Kothimeera Puvvulanti"	S. V. Krishna Reddy		
2001	Chocklet (D)	"Suyodhana Duryodhana"	Deva		
2001	Chocklet (D)	"Oh Priya Oh Pirya"	Deva		
2001	Deevinchandi	"Chilakamma Chilakamma"	S. A. Rajkumar		
2001	Deevinchandi	"Ammammo Chaligavundi"	S. A. Rajkumar		
2001	Jabili	"Achamaina Telugu"	S. V. Krishna Reddy		
2001	Manasantha Nuvve	"Dhin Dhin Dhinak"	R. P. Patnaik		
2001	Muthyam	"Nooziveedu Mamidi"	Vandemataram Srinivas		
2001	Ninnu Choodalani	"Ye Chota Nenunna"	S. A. Rajkumar		
2002	Bharatasimha Reddy	"Malli Malli"	S. A. Rajkumar		
2002	Indhra	"Dhaayi Dhaayi Dhamma"	Mani Sharma		
2002	Kalalu Kandham Raa	"Siri Siri Muvvala"	Ramesh Erra		
2002	Premaku Swagatam	"Andhaka Yuvarani"	S. V. Krishna Reddy		
2002	Rahashyam (D)	"Ee Nagarame"	Nadeem–Shravan		
2002	Rahashyam (D)	"Jillumantondhi"	Nadeem–Shravan		
2002	Rahashyam (D)	"Kantiki Edhuruga"	Nadeem–Shravan		
2002	Rahashyam (D)	"Needu Premenule"	Nadeem–Shravan		
2002	Rahashyam (D)	"Evevo Baashalu"	Nadeem–Shravan		
2002	Rahashyam (D)	"Neelanti Jodu"	Nadeem–Shravan		
2003	Chantigadu	"Okkasari Pilichavante"	Vandemataram Srinivas		
2003	Neetho Vastha	"Kalasina Tholakari"	M. M. Srilekha		
2003	Praanam	"Nindu Noorella"	Kamalakar		
2003	Tagore	"Manmadha Manmadha"	Mani Sharma		
2004	Adavi Ramudu	"Aakasham Sakshiga"	Mani Sharma		
2004	Anji	"Gumma Gulabi Komma"	Mani Sharma		
2004	Lakshmi Narasimha	"Pappesuko Charesuko"	Mani Sharma		
2004	Lakshmi Narasimha	"Naathothi Neeku"	Mani Sharma		
2004	Mee Intikoste Em Istaaru Maa Intkoste Em Testaaru	"Chammaku Chakkera"	Ghantadi Krishna		
2004	Samba	"Luxemburg Lux Sundari"	Mani Sharma		
2004	Vidyardhi	"Andhra Khiladi"	Mani Sharma		
2005	Allari Pidugu	"Ongolu Githaro"	Mani Sharma		
2005	Athadu	"Chandamama"	Mani Sharma		
2005	Balu	"Athi Methani"	Mani Sharma		
2005	Jai Chiranjeeva	"Thumsup Thunder"	Mani Sharma		
2005	Narasimhudu	"Mudhoche Kopalu"	Mani Sharma		
2005	Orey Pandu	"Aakasha Veedhilo"	Anand Raaj Anand		
2005	Orey Pandu	"Come Come"	Anand Raaj Anand		
2005	Subash Chandra Bose	"Neredu Pallu"	Mani Sharma		
2006	Dhoom 2 (D)	"Raajukunna Segalalona"	Pritam		
2006	Pokiri	"Choododdu Antunna"	Mani Sharma		
2006	Raghavan (D)	"Hrudayame"	Harris Jayaraj		
2006	Ramalayam Veedhilo Madhumathi	"Churukanti"	Kishan		
2006	Ranam	"Varevva"	Mani Sharma		
2006	Stalin	"Go Go Gova Maguva"	Mani Sharma		
2006	Style	"Thadava Thadavaku"	Mani Sharma		
2006	Veerabhadra	"Jujibeelallo"	Mani Sharma		
2007	Munna	"Manasa Nuvvunde"(Film)	Harris Jayaraj		
2007	Munna	"Manasa Nuvvunde"(Humming)	Harris Jayaraj		
2007	Ta Ra Rum Pum (D)	"Ta Ra Ram Pum"	Vishal–Shekhar		
2007	Ta Ra Rum Pum (D)	"Hey Shonaa Hey Shonaa"	Vishal–Shekhar		
2008	Chintakayala Ravi	"Shava Shava Bhalle"	Vishal–Shekhar		
2008	Chintakayala Ravi	"Endhuko Tholi"	Vishal–Shekhar		
2008	Dasavathaaram (D)	"Oh Sanama Ho Sanam"	Himesh Reshammiya		
2008	Dasavathaaram (D)	"Oh Sanam Ho Sanam"(Remix)	Himesh Reshammiya		
2008	Krishna	"Dil Maange More"	Chakri		
2008	Salute	"Endammaya"	Harris Jayaraj		
2009	Konchem Ishtam Konchem Kashtam	"Abbacha"	Shankar–Ehsaan–Loy		
2012	Brothers (D)	"Kommalanni Poovai"	Harris Jayaraj		Javed Ali
2019	Manikarnika: The Queen of Jhansi (D)	"Naa Raja"	Shankar–Ehsaan–Loy		
2019	Manikarnika: The Queen of Jhansi (D)	"Rae Raelae Re"	Shankar–Ehsaan–Loy		

==== Bengali ====
Year	Song	Film	Music director	Co-singer(s)
2006	"Mon Dole"	Ghatak	Jeet Gannguli	Shaan
2009	"Bolo Piya"	Saat Paake Bandha	Jeet Gannguli	Sonu Nigam
2012	"Tore Niye Jai"	Khokababu	Rishi Chanda	Zubeen Garg
2012	"Guti Guti Paye"	Bikram Singha	Shree Pritam	Shaan
2012	"Dhuan Dhuan"	Bikram Singha	Shree Pritam	Shaan
2012	"Sajna Paas Aa Tu Jara"	Idiot	Shree Pritam	Shaan
2012	"Jhor Othe Mone"	Idiot	Shree Pritam	Zubeen Garg
2013	"O Bondhu Amar"	Khoka 420	Shree Pritam	Shaan
2013	"Govinda Jay Jay"	Khoka 420	Shree Pritam	Abhijeet Bhattacharya
2013	"Pagal Ami Already"	Khiladi	Shree Pritam	Zubeen Garg
2018	"Mon E Kemon"	Wrong Route	Dev Sen	Imran Mahmudul
2018	"Ja Hobe Dekha"	Raja Rani Raji	Lincon	Shaan

==== Marathi ====
Marathi Film Songs
Year	Song	Film	Music director	Co-singer(s)
2006	"Naach Gaanyacha Rang"	Nana Mama	Sachin Sanghvi	Solo
2011	"Mala Sang Na"	Sharyat	Chinar - Mahesh	Solo
2014	"Daatale Reshami"	Timepass	Chinar - Mahesh	Chinar Kharkar
2015	"Angat Rangat"	Kaay Raav Tumhi	Kanak Raj	Solo
2015	"Praju"	Timepass 2	Chinar - Mahesh	Rishikesh Kamerkar
2015	"Sune Sune"	Welcome Zindagi	Soumil Shringarpure-Siddharth Mahadevan	Solo
2015	"Abhas Ha"	3:56 Killari	Chinar - Mahesh	Solo
2018	"Runa Zuna"	Memory Card	Mitesh-Pritesh	Javed Ali
2018	"Halwa Halwa"	Jaga Vegli Antyatra	Rohan Pradhan & Rohan Gokhale	Siddharth Mahadevan

==== Kannada ====
Kannada Film Songs
Year	Song	Film	Music director	Co-singer(s)
2003	"Ee Nanna Kannaane"	Abhi	Gurukiran	Udit Narayan
2004	"Ninna Mareyalare"	Kanchana Ganga	S. A. Rajkumar	Udit Narayan
2007	"Yeko Yeno"	Arasu	Joshua Sridhar	Solo
2008	"Dheem Dheem"	Accident	V. Harikrishna	Sonu Nigam
2013	"Yarigu Kanada Kamana Billina"	Mandahasa	Veer Samarth	Karthik
2018	"Nee Yaaro Nanage"	Amma I Love You	Gurukiran	Santhosh Venky
2018	"Minugo Putta Taregale"	Saahasa Makkalu	Sharath Bilinele	

=== Non-film songs ===
Year	Album	Song	Composer	Lyricist	Co-singer(s)	Language	Notes	Ref.
1996	Zubeenor Gaan	"Ujagori Nikhaar"	Zubeen Garg	Zubeen Garg	Zubeen Garg	Assamese		
1996	Rong	"Rong Tumi Huwane"	Zubeen Garg	Zubeen Garg	Zubeen Garg	Assamese		
1998	Sach Ka Saath	"Sach Ka Saath"	Trilok Singh Loomba			Hindi	Background vocal/Chorus only (Uncredited)	
1998	Nazar Nazar		Mandar Agashe			Hindi	Background vocal only	
1998	Meghor Boron	"Aagoli Kolapat"	Zubeen Garg	Zubeen Garg	Solo	Assamese		
1998	Meghor Boron	"Jodihe Jun Tora" (Version 1)	Zubeen Garg	Zubeen Garg	Zubeen Garg	Assamese		
1998	Meghor Boron	"Purnima Jun Tumi"	Zubeen Garg	Zubeen Garg	Zubeen Garg, Udit Narayan, Sagarika Mukherjee Da Costa	Assamese		
1998	Sabda	"Kokal Khamusiya"	Zubeen Garg	Zubeen Garg	Zubeen Garg	Assamese		
1998	Snigdha Junak	"Fagun Ahile Boi"	Diganta Bharati	Zubeen Garg	Solo	Assamese		
1999	Stolen Moments	"Aur Ahistha"	Pankaj Udhas			Hindi	Background vocal only (Uncredited)	
2000	Sparsh	"Kya Hone Laga Mujhe"	Zubeen Garg	Zubeen Garg	Zubeen Garg, Sagarika Mukherjee Da Costa	Hindi		
2001	Pranayam	"Thengum Nin Ullam"	Thej Mervin	M.A. Babji		Malayalam		
2002	Dance Masti Again	"Aaja Piya"	Shankar–Ehsaan–Loy		Instant Karma	Hindi		

== Awards and nominations ==
Year	Award	Category	Song	Film	Result	Ref(s)
2008	Zee Cine Awards	Best Female Playback Singer	"Bolna Halke Halke" "Tenu Leke"	Jhoom Barabar Jhoom; Salaam-e-Ishq	Nominated	
2010	Grammy Awards	Best Song for Visual Media (As a performer)	"Jai Ho"	Slumdog Millionaire	Won	
2013	Maharashtra State Film Awards	Best Female Playback Singer	"Daatale Reshmi Dhuke"	Timepass	Won	
2016	Filmfare Awards South	Best Female Playback Singer – Tamil	"Un Maela Oru Kannu"	Rajinimurugan	Nominated	
2016	IIFA Utsavam	Best Playback Singer Female – Tamil	"Un Maela Oru Kannu"	Rajinimurugan	Nominated	
2017	Odisha State Film Awards	Best Female Playback Singer	"Dheu Kere Kule"	Mimamsa	Won	
2021	Gujarati Iconic Film Awards (GIFA)	Best Playback Singer (Female)	"Raah Jue Shangar Adhuro"	21mu Tiffin	Won	
2024	Filmfare Awards Assamese	Best Female Playback Singer – Assamese	"Silmil Tupanite"	Raghav	Won	

Apart from the above awards, Mahalakshmi has also been conferred upon by the following:

- Alpha award for Best Playback for Adhar
- Maharashtra Kala Niketan Award for Suna Yeti Ghaara
