= Jatin Bora =

Indian actor (born 1970)

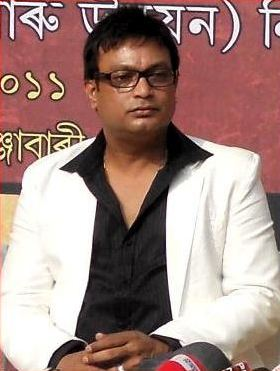
- Jatin on the muhurat of Jahnu Barua's film Baandhon on 11 December 2011
- Born: 25 April 1970 (age 56); Nagaon, Assam, India
- Other name: Bubu
- Occupations: Actor, Film Director, Producer
- Years active: 1989 - present
- Spouse: Navanita Sharma (m. 2002)
- Children: 2 (Astha Bora, Drishan Bora)
- Parents: Gakul Chandra Bora (father); Premalota Bora (mother)

Jatin Bora (born 25 April 1970) is an Indian actor and director who has appeared in Assamese language films since 1989. He is also an actor and director in some mobile theatre (Bhramyaman) groups of Assam, including Aabahan, Hengool, Ashirbaad, Bhagyadevi, Kohinoor, Itihas and Surjya.He lost his stardom and faced criticism after taking hypocritical steps in the CAA protests.

== Early life ==
Jatin Bora was born to Sri Gakul Chandra Bora and Premolata Bora, in Kacholukhowa village, Nagaon, Assam. He did his primary schooling in Marikalang Prathamik Vidyalaya and secondary schooling at Dawson Higher Secondary and Multipurpose School. As a child he used to take part in Navajyoti Sangha Maina Parijat, a weekly children's cultural meet, near his village. He was taught the nuances of Bhaona, the traditional Assamese drama, as a child. He has a diploma in Fine Arts from the Kallol Art School in Nagaon and is a Visharad in tabla.

== Career ==
=== Films ===
Although he had a minor role in Kolahal, his first professional film officially debuted in Uttarkaal (1989) (opposite Moloya Goswami). The movie was successful, and Jatin became a star of the Assamese cinema.

After Uttarkal, Bora acted in several plays for Doordarshan. He featured in the teleserials like Biju Phukan’s Deuta, Chandra Talukdar’s Namgharia, Birina Paator Anguthee, Jones Mahalia's Pratighat, Surangor Majere, and Ghat-Pratighat. In 1993 he had a role in the film I Killed Him Sir.

He was commercially successful in Munin Barua's romantic drama film Hiya Diya Niya in 2000, opposite debutante Luna Lahkar and Ravi Sarma. The best known songs of the movie were "Nohole porichoy" and "Mitha Mitha Aji Xopunote" by Assamese singer Zubeen Garg.

In the same year, he also appeared in a negative role in Zubeen Garg debut directed film Tumi Mur Mathu Mur.

After that he appeared in back to back many films of Munin Barua, like Nayak, Kanyadaan, Daag, Bidhata etc. 2001 romance film Nayak (with co-stars Zerifa Wahid and Ravi Sarma) was one of the biggest hits in his career. In Kanyadaan, he acted along with Mridula Baruah and Chetana Das. He also had performances in the films like, Agnisakhi, Kadambari, Suren Suror Putek etc.

In 2003, he appeared in Munin Barua's highly acclaimed film Bidhata, which was said to be an Assamese adaptation of the Bollywood movie Anand.

He began his directorial career in 2006 with a film called Adhinayak. This film was extensively shot in Barapani, Cherrapunji and in and around Guwahati.

Later in 2019 he directed and acted as the lead in the movie Ratnakar.

=== Mobile theatre ===
He joined Hengool Theatre in 1994. In the following year he got an offer from Abahon Theatre, then for the 1995-96 season. He continues to be actively involved in Assamese moving theatre industry. He acted in their plays written for Abahon. In 1997, Dr Bhabedranath Saikia cast him for his first and only Hindi film Kaal Sandhya.

In 2000s and 2010s, he was associated with Ashirbad Theatre (2004-05/2010-11), Kohinoor Theatre (2007-08/2008-09/2009-10), Theatre Bhagyadevi (2006-07/2011-12/2012-13), Itihas Theatre (2013–14), Brindabon Theatre (2014–15), Rajtilak Theatre (2015–16). In 2016–17 and 2017–18, he was with Theatre Surjya.

=== Awards ===
Bora won the Jyotirupa Joint Media Award for Excellence in Film Television & Music (for Hiya Diya Niya, Nayak, Bidhata, Maa tumi Ananya, Suren Suror Putek), Natasurya Phani Sarma Award (a government of Assam award for Juwe Pura Xun), NE TV people's choice for Kadambari and Maa tumi Ananya, Prag Cine award "Best Actor" for Kadambari in 2005, Moonlight media award for Hiya Diya Niya, Nayak, Kanyadaan and Bidhata.

== Filmography ==
| Year | Film | Director |
|---|---|---|
| 1989 | Uttarkal | Abdul Majid |
| 1995 | I killed him, Sir | Pradip Gogoi |
| 1997 | Kaal Sandhya | Bhabendra Nath Saikia |
| 2000 | Hiya Diya Niya | Munin Barua |
| 2000 | Ahankar | Pradip Hazarika |
| 2000 | Tumi Mur Mathu Mur | Zubeen Garg |
| 2001 | Sesh Upahar | Gopal Borthakur |
| 2001 | Daag | Munin Barua |
| 2001 | Anya Ek Jatra | Manju Bora |
| 2001 | Ei Morom Tumar Babe | Taufique Rahman |
| 2001 | Nayak | Munin Barua |
| 2001 | Koina Mur Dhuniya | Suman Haripriya |
| 2002 | Prem Aru Prem | Sambhu Gupta |
| 2002 | Jibon Nodir Duti Paar | Munna Ahmed |
| 2002 | Tyag | Narayan Seal |
| 2002 | Jonaki Mon | Jibanraj Barman |
| 2002 | Premgeet | Ashish Saikia |
| 2002 | Priya O Priya | Anjan Kalita |
| 2002 | Kanyadaan | Munin Barua |
| 2002 | Mitha Mitha Logonot | Achyut Kumar Bhagawati; Sushanta Majindar Baruah |
| 2003 | Agnisakhi | Jadumani Dutta |
| 2003 | Priya Milon | Munna Ahmed |
| 2003 | Bidhata | Munin Barua |
| 2003 | Jumon Sumon | Mohibul Haque |
| 2003 | Ujonir Dujoni Gabhoru | Chandra Mudoi |
| 2003 | Eyei Junak Bihin Jivan | Munna Ahmed |
| 2003 | Hepaah | Shankar Borua |
| 2004 | Maa Tumi Ananya | Munna Ahmed |
| 2004 | Hridoy Kapowa Gaan | Jayanta Nath |
| 2004 | Barood | Munin Barua |
| 2004 | Juye Poora Xoon | Sanjib Sabhapandit |
| 2004 | Rong | Munin Barua |
| 2004 | Dinabandhu | Munin Barua |
| 2004 | Kadambari | Bani Das |
| 2003 | Borolar Sansar (Not Released) | |
| 2005 | Senai Mur Dhuliya | Chandra Mudoi |
| 2005 | Suren Suror Putek | Chandra Mudoi |
| 2006 | Aghari Aatma | Munna Ahmed |
| 2006 | Adhinayak | Jatin Bora |
| 2006 | Deuta Diya Bidai | Ramesh Modi |
| 2007 | Unmona Mon | Rajesh Bhuyan |
| 2008 | Anjana 2009 | Rajesh Bhuyan |
| 2009 | Dhunia Tirutabur | Prodyut Kumar Deka |
| 2011 | Raamdhenu | Munin Barua |
| 2011 | Janmoni | Rajesh Bhuyan |
| 2012 | Baandhon | Jahnu Barua |
| 2014 | Hiya Diba Kak | Rajiv Bora |
| 2014 | Jilmil Jonak | Sibanan Boruah |
| 2016 | Doordarshan Eti Jantra | Rajesh Bhuyan |
| 2016 | Bahniman | Biswajeet Bora |
| 2018 | Nijanor Gaan | Munna Ahmed |
| 2019 | Ratnakar | Jatin Bora |
| 2020 | Chiyahir Rong | Prodyut Kumar Deka |
| 2023 | Raghav | Jatin Bora |
| 2026 | Agnibaan | Mrinmoy Arun Saikia |
