= Jilmil Jonak =

- Directed by: Sibanan Boruah
- Written by: Horen Chandra Rajkhowa
- Screenplay by: Sibanan Boruah
- Produced by: Daijee Gogoi
- Starring: Jatin Bora; Nishita Goswami; Raag Oinitom; Shyamontika Sharma
- Music by: Manas Robin
- Production company: Daijee Cine Productions
- Release date: 30 May 2014
- Country: India
- Language: Assamese
- Budget: ₹1 crore (US$110,000)

Jilmil Jonak (English: Glittering Moonlight) is a 2014 Indian Assamese language drama film starring Jatin Bora and Nishita Goswami in the lead roles. The film was directed by Sibanan Boruah and produced under the banner of Daijee Cine Productions by Daijee Gogoi and written by Horen Chandra Rajkhowa, released on 30 May 2014.

== Plot ==
Jilmil Jonak traces the life of a successful businessman based in Thailand. Aloof from his family for years, the story takes a twist when his past and family comes back to him.

== Cast ==
- Jatin Bora
- Nishita Goswami
- Nipon Goswami
- Raag Oinitam
- Ronin Gogoi
- Shyamontika Sharma
- Podmarag Goswami
- Akashdeep Deka
- Indraneil Sengupta
- Bikramaditya Gogoi
- Anamika Gogoi

== Production ==
Jilmil Jonak is the second Assamese feature film directed by Sibanan Boruah. Earlier Boruah directed Hiyar Dapunot Tumarei Chobi. The mahurut of the film was held on 30 May 2013 at Panjabari, Guwahati. Filming started at Guwahati, and later moved to Thailand. A couple of songs and dramatic sequences were filmed in Bangkok and Pattaya. This is the second Assamese film, after Ahir Bhairav, for which shooting took place outside of India. The budget of the film was approximated to be ₹1 crore (US$110,000).
