= Kohinoor Theatre =

Mobile theatre group in Assam, India

- Promotional image of 2015-2016 Kohinoor Theatre.
- Address: Pathsala, Assam; India
- Owner: Ratan Lahkar
- Type: Mobile theatre

Construction
- Opened: 1976
- Years active: 1976 - present

The Kohinoor Theatre (Assamese: কহিনুৰ থিয়েটাৰ) is a mobile theatre group of the North-Eastern Indian state of Assam, founded by Sri Ratan Lahkar in 1976. Kohinoor Theatre has performed dramas based on Indian, Assamese culture and some works of Shakespeare. The theatre also brought the Atlantic Ocean on stage by performing the movie Titanic.

Kohinoor Theatre is the only Assamese mobile theatre group that has performed at New Delhi, Assam. The National School of Drama (NSD) invited the troupe to perform in New Delhi in the year 2010 for 3 days from 25 to 29 April.

== List of plays ==
List of Plays from 35th season (2010-11) is listed below

Season	Play	Playwright	Starring	
2010-11	Eta Nasta Lorar Galpa	Hemanta Dutta	Nayan Nilim, Rimpi Das, Hiren Medhi, Dulumoni Deka etc.	
2010-11	Kohinoor, Nohoi Mathu Eti heera	Abhijeet Bhattacharya	Nayan Nilim, Rimpi Das, Hiren Medhi, Dulumoni Deka etc.	
2010-11	Rumal	Abhijeet Bhattacharya	Nayan Nilim, Rimpi Das, Hiren Medhi, Dulumoni Deka etc.	
2011-12	Bhal Pau Buli Nokoba	Abhijeet Bhattacharya	Barsha Rani Bishaya, Dibyajyoti Das, Franky, Hiren Medhi, Dulumoni Deka etc.	
2011-12	Kopouphul	Abhijeet Bhattacharya	Barsha Rani Bishaya, Dibyajyoti Das, Franky, Hiren Medhi, Dulumoni Deka etc.	
2011-12	Path	Hemanta Dutta	Barsha Rani Bishaya, Dibyajyoti Das, Franky, Hiren Medhi, Dulumoni Deka etc.	
2011-12	Titanic	Hemanta Dutta	Barsha Rani Bishaya, Dibyajyoti Das, Franky, Hiren Medhi, Dulumoni Deka etc.	
2012-13	Erabator Sur	Abhijeet Bhattacharya	Tapan Das, Angoorlata, Tushar Pritam, Hiren Medhi, Dulumoni Deka etc.	
2012-13	Jed	Abhijeet Bhattacharya	Tapan Das, Angoorlata, Tushar Pritam, Hiren Medhi, Dulumoni Deka etc.	
2012-13	Hiyar Epahi Gulap	Abhijeet Bhattacharya	Tapan Das, Angoorlata, Tushar Pritam, Hiren Medhi, Dulumoni Deka etc.	
2012-13	Hendur	Hemanta Dutta	Tapan Das, Angoorlata, Tushar Pritam, Hiren Medhi, Dulumoni Deka etc.	
2013-14	Devdas	Abhijeet Bhattacharya	Tapan Das, Moonmi Phukan etc.	
2013-14	Edin Tumi Ahibay	Abhijeet Bhattacharya	Tapan Das, Moonmi Phukan etc.	
2013-14	Akakhor Dore Mon	Hemanta Dutta	Tapan Das, Moonmi Phukan etc.	
2014-15	Moromor Jui	Abhijeet Bhattacharya	Rajkumar, Moonmi Phukan, Chinmoy Kotoky etc.	
2014-15	Footpathor Romeo	Abhijeet Bhattacharya	Rajkumar, Moonmi Phukan, Chinmoy Kotoky etc.	
2014-15	Mukti	Hemanta Dutta	Rajkumar, Moonmi Phukan, Chinmoy Kotoky etc.	
2015-16	DSP Durga	Abhijeet Bhattacharya	Moytreyee Priyadarshini, Dibyajyoti Das, Mahesh Bora etc.	
2015-16	Chakrabehu	Hemanta Dutta	Moytreyee Priyadarshini, Dibyajyoti Das, Mahesh Bora etc.	
2015-16	Gupute Gupute	Bhaskar Barman	Moytreyee Priyadarshini, Dibyajyoti Das, Mahesh Bora etc.	
2016-17	Radha Ebar Hahi De	Abhijeet Bhattacharya	Barsha Rani Bishaya, Kamal Reboti etc.	
2016-17	Breaking News	Rajdweep	Barsha Rani Bishaya, Kamal Reboti etc.	
2017-18	Siyor	Hemanta Dutta	Tehsin Akhtar, Arup Bora etc.	
2017-18	Best of luck	Rajdweep	Tehsin Akhtar, Arup Bora etc.	
2017-18	Relpothot Ejoni Suali	Abhijeet Bhattacharya	Tehsin Akhtar, Arup Bora etc.	
2018-19	Radhai Namane Badha	Champak Sharma	Arup Bora	
2018-19	Beporua Prem	Rajdweep	Arup Bora	
2018-19	Gurudakshina	Abhijit Bhattacharya	Arup Bora	
2019-20	Droupadir Bastra Haran	Champak Sharma	Debojit Mazumdar, Arup Baishya etc.	
2019-20	Mor Tejot Tomar Naam	Abhijeet Bhattacharya	Debojit Mazumdar, Arup Baishya etc.	
2019-20	Boroxa Jetia Naame	Rajdweep	Debojit Mazumdar, Arup Baishya etc.	
2022-23	Bishnupriya	Rajdweep		
2022-23	Naginir Amrit Dongkhon	Kishore Tahbildar		
2022-23	Ardhanaari	Champak Sarma		
2023-24	ABCD	Mridul Chutiya		
2023-24	Dipawoli	Champak Sharma		
2023-24	I Love You	Manjit Sharma		2024-25
