= Hiya Diya Niya =

- Directed by: Munin Barua
- Screenplay by: Munin Barua
- Produced by: Merry Laskar (Pooja Motion Pictures)
- Starring: Jatin Bora; Luna Lahkar; Ravi Sarma; Geetawali Rajkumari
- Cinematography: Mrinal Kanti Das
- Edited by: A. Sreekar Prasad
- Music by: Zubeen Garg
- Release date: 25 February 2000
- Running time: 165 min
- Country: India
- Language: Assamese
- Budget: 10 lakhs
- Box office: 1.1 crore

Hiya Diya Niya is a 2000 Indian Assamese romantic drama movie directed by Munin Barua and produced under Pooja Motion Pictures. The music was composed by Zubeen Garg. It was released on 25 February 2000. This film marked Assamese's first film to be shot outside India.

Hiya Diya Niya by Munin Barua was a blockbuster that became almost every household's choice to watch on the big screen and gave a fresh wave to revive the Assamese film industry with its commercial success. It became the highest grossing Assamese film of 2000 and is currently the 14th highest grossing Assamese film.

== Synopsis ==
A rich family searches for a husband for their daughter. The father wants his daughter to marry his friend's son who lives in a village, but the mother and daughter prefer an NRI boy.

== Cast ==
- Jatin Bora as Dipu/Dulal
- Luna Lahkar as Momi
- Ravi Sarma as Abinash
- Geetawali Rajkumari as Sunita
- Pranjal Saikia as Niren
- Mridula Baruah as Runu
- Hiranya Das as Sunny
- Chetana Das
- Nipon Goswami
- Rina Bora
- Jayanta Bhagawati

== Production ==
The cinematography was the work of Mrinal Kanti Das. (not to be confused with the Bengali politician of the same name) The film production started on 7 September 1999 and wrapped up on 14 October 1999.

== Soundtrack ==
Hiya Diya Niya

Soundtrack album by Zubeen Garg
- Released: 25 October 1999 (Audio Cassette); January 2000 (Audio CD)
- Recorded: 1999
- Genre: Feature film soundtrack
- Length: 35:28 (Audio Cassette); 41:29 (Audio CD)
- Language: Assamese
- Label: Pooja Motion Pictures; NK Production; Vee Gee Audio (Wave Music); Music Makers; Venus; JG Cassette; RDC Media Pvt. Ltd
- Producer: Merry Laskar

Zubeen Garg chronology
Hiya Diya Niya (1999)	Tumi Mor Matho Mor (1999)

The music of Hiya Diya Niya was composed by Zubeen Garg. It was his first film as a music director along with his other movie Tumi Mur Mathu Mur. The soundtrack was released in 25 October 1999 on Audio Cassette format and in January 2000 on Audio CD format. It became one of the first Assamese soundtrack album to be released in Audio CD format. Lyrics were written by Hemanta Dutta, Diganta Bharati and Jimoni Choudhury. The singers who lent their voices in this film are Zubeen Garg, Queen Hazarika, Malobika Bora, Tarali Sarma, Shanta Uzir, Chetana Das, Hiranya Deka, Diganta Bharati and Debojit Choudhury. The album contains 8 total tracks on Audio Cassette and 9 total tracks (8 main tracks + 1 hidden track) on Audio CD. All the songs were very much popular among the masses.

Tracklist
No.	Title	Lyrics	Singer(s)	Length
1.	"Nohole Porisoi" (Male)	Hemanta Dutta	Zubeen Garg	4:22
2.	"Buku Bhora"	Jimoni Choudhury	Malobika Bora	4:00
3.	"Moloyar Dupakhit"	Diganta Bharati	Tarali Sarma, Zubeen Garg	5:38
4.	"Kothati Bujilu"	Diganta Bharati	Tarali Sarma, Zubeen Garg	6:17
5.	"Nohole Porisoi" (Female)	Hemanta Dutta	Shanta Uzir	4:19
6.	"Misate Misate"	Diganta Bharati	Zubeen Garg, Diganta Bharati, Chetana Das, Hiranya Deka	3:51
7.	"Hiya Diya Niya - Theme"	Zubeen Garg	Zubeen Garg	3:41
8.	"Mitha Mitha"	Jimoni Choudhury	Zubeen Garg, Debojit Choudhury, Shanta Uzir, Malobika Bora	4:40
9.	"Untitled Background Score" (Hidden Track)		Zubeen Garg, Shaan, Sagarika	1:00

Notes

- After the final listed track (i.e., Track 8 or "Mitha Mitha"), there are approximately 5 minutes of silence, then the Untitled Background Score (Hidden Track) appears which was sung by Zubeen Garg, Shaan and Sagarika.
