= Shudhu Tumi =

2004 film

- Theatrical release poster
- Directed by: Abhijit Guha; Sudeshna Roy
- Written by: Abhijit Guha; Sudeshna Roy
- Produced by: Sagar Bhora; Siddhartha Bhora
- Starring: Prosenjit; Koel
- Edited by: Sujay Dutta Ray
- Music by: Zubeen Garg
- Release date: 15 October 2004
- Country: India
- Language: Bengali

Shudhu Tumi (transl. Only you) is a 2004 Bengali romantic action drama film directed by Abhijit Guha and Sudeshna Roy, produced by Sagar Bhora and Siddhartha Bhora, and starring Prosenjit and Koel in the lead roles. Zubeen Garg composed the music.

== Cast ==
- Prosenjit as Rohit
- Koel as Nandini
- Gargi Roychowdhury as Rani
- Payel Sarkar as Anjana, Rohit's sister
- Kalyani Mondal as Rohit's Mother
- Arijit Chowdhury
- Debnath Chattopadhyay
- Dwijen Bandyopadhyay Rohit's Uncle
- Joyjit Banerjee as Rohit's Brother Rahul
- Parthasarathi Deb

== Soundtrack ==
Shudhu Tumi

Soundtrack album by Zubeen Garg
- Released: 10 February 2004
- Genre: Feature film soundtrack
- Length: 36:52
- Label: Fontana India; Universal Music Group

Zubeen Garg chronology
Rong (2004)	Shudhu Tumi (2004)	Dinabandhu (2004)

The music of the Shudhu Tumi was composed by Zubeen Garg with lyrics written by Sumit Acharya. The soundtrack contains eight total tracks with four original Bengali tracks and the other four Bengali tracks, which were reused from Garg's earlier compositions for Assamese films. "Gun Gun Gun Gunjare" reused "Ul Guthibo Janene" from 2002 Assamese film Kanyadaan, "Shure Shure Gaan Holo" reused "Lahe Lahe Barhise" from 2001 Assamese film Nayak, "E Choker Kachhete" reused "Monore Poduli Dolisa" from 2004 Assamese film Barood, and "Sajbe Ebar Koner" reused "Mahadev Keni Gol" from 2003 Assamese film Agnisakshi. The song "Bheja Bheja Smiritir Pathor" was later reused as "Apon Buli Jakei" in the Assamese film Adhinayak in 2006.

=== Track listing ===
No.	Title	Singer(s)	Length
1.	"Gun Gun Gun Gunjare, Antare"	Shreya Ghoshal, Sagarika	4:32
2.	"Shure Shure Gaan Holo"	Shaan, Shaswati	4:06
3.	"Piriti Kathaler Aatha"	Joy, Zubeen Garg, Shaswati	4:56
4.	"E Chokher Kachhete"	Shaan, Hilsa, Pritha Majumder	5:27
5.	"Ektuku Chhoan Lage" (Version 1)	Babul Supriyo, Shreya Ghoshal	4:28
6.	"Bheja Bheja Smritir Pathor"	Zubeen Garg	4:35
7.	"Sajbe Ebar Koner Saaje"	Udit Narayan, Pamela Jain, Ritika Sahni	4:17
8.	"Ektuku Chhoan Lage" (Version 2)	Zubeen Garg	4:31
Total length:			36:52
