= Sagarika =

Indian singer and actress

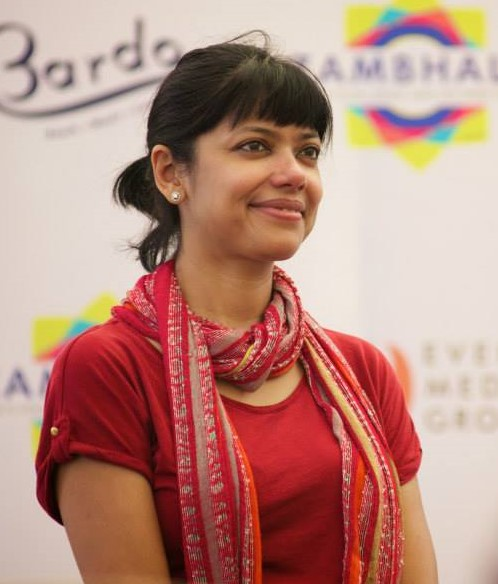
- Sagarika in 2013
- Born: Sagarika Mukherjee; Mumbai, Maharashtra, India
- Other names: Saag (Nickname); Sagarika Mukherjee Da Costa; Sagarika Da Costa
- Education: Jai Hind College, Mumbai
- Occupations: Singer; composer; actress; restaurateur
- Years active: 1979–present
- Spouse: Martin Da Costa (m. 2002)
- Children: 2
- Parents: Manas Mukherjee (father); Sonali Mukherjee (mother)
- Relatives: Shaan (brother)
- Musical career
- Genres: Blues; Filmi; Pop; Indipop
- Instruments: Vocals, guitar
- Labels: Polygram; Magnasound Records; Sony Music; Sony BMG; Bertelsmann Music Group; Universal Music Group; Warner Music Group; Virgin Records; EMI Records; Saregama

Sagarika Mukherjee, professionally known as Sagarika or simply Saag, is an Indian singer and actress. She sings mainly Hindi, Assamese, and Bengali language songs, but has also sung in the Tamil and Telugu languages. She is the daughter of singer and composer Manas Mukherjee, sister of singer and actor Shaan, granddaughter of lyricist Jahar Mukherjee, and close friend of actress and singer Suchitra Krishnamoorthi, Suchitra Pillai and Raageshwari Loomba.

Before going solo, she was half of a popular Indian duo with her brother with whom she released albums such as Q-Funk, Roop Inka Mastana and Naujawan. Apart from singing and acting in movies and albums, she is also a restaurateur.

== Early life ==
Sagarika Mukherjee was born in Mumbai, Maharashtra, India, but originally comes from a Bengali family. Her father died in 1986. Then, her mother became a singer and took charge of the entire family.

== Career ==
=== Early singing ===
Sagarika made her debut as a child playback singer in the Bollywood film Shaayad in 1979 and in the Bengali film Agnishuddi in 1984. Later, she sang several Bollywood film songs.

In 1998, she released her first album Maa after going solo. Then in 2001, her second album Mere Liye was released along with her brother Shaan and co-singers Zubeen Garg and Suchitra Pillai and also was her first music composer of all songs in the album. Later in 2006, her third album It's All About Love was released by Universal Distribution. She collaborated with Pakistani band Strings on the song "Pal". It is featured in the band's fourth album Dhaani.

In 1998, Sagarika debuted in the Assamese Music Industry as an adult playback singer with her first Assamese Song in the film Joubone Amoni Kore. However, the film did not feature her song and it was only used as a bonus track in the original soundtrack for the film. A year later, the Assamese film Morom Nodir Gabhoru Gaat featured two songs sung by Sagarika, thus leading to her official debut in an Assamese film. Sagarika contributed to several Assamese albums and original soundtracks like Pansoi, Megha, Meghor Boron, Maharathi, Jon Jwole Kopalot, Bishforan, Garam Botaah, Aei Morom Tumar Babe, Nayak, Jonaki Mon etc.

=== Actin ===
Along with singing, Sagarika acted her first Bengali-language film "Shyam Saheb" in 1986. Later, she acted few Bollywood and regional films as well as guest appearances in regional films such as Biyer Phool (1996), Prem Aru Prem (2002), Jonaki Mon (2002), two Assamese film and Inteqam: The Perfect Game (2004). She did not appear in any film in 2005 or 2006. Her only film in 2007 was Kalishankar (2007), a Bengali film (opposite Prosenjit Chatterjee and Swastika Mukherjee). In the same year, she initially made a supporting role in the Bollywood film Life in a Metro, however, her scene was cut during the editing process.

== Personal life ==
Sagarika married Portugal born event manager Martin Da Costa on 4 February 2002.

She is a close friend of actress and singer Raageshwari Loomba, Suchitra Krishnamoorthi, Suchitra Pillai, and make-up artist Pallavi Symons.

== Discography ==
=== Studio albums ===
Year	Album details	Language
1998	Maa	Hindi
2001	Mere Liye	Hindi
2004	Tumar Akash	Bengali
2006	It's All About Love	Hindi

=== Remix albums ===
Year	Album details	Language
1995	Oorja	Hindi
1995	Roop Inka Mastana	Hindi
1997	Club Class	Hindi

=== Compilation albums ===
Year	Album details	Language
1996	Channel Hits	Hindi
1997	Party Zone	Hindi
1998	The Ultimate Party Album	Hindi
2000	Best of Zubeen Vol 6	Assamese
2001	32 Smash Hits	Hindi
2001	Santiago Fiesta Latina: Bollywood Goes Latino (Vol I, II and III)	Hindi
2002	Hitz Unlimited	Hindi

=== Other albums ===
Year	Album(s)	Role	Language	Note(s)
1994	Jonaki Mon	As a backing vocalist	Assamese	
1996	Oohalu	As a backing vocalist	Telugu	
1997	Surer Upahar	As a backing vocalist	Bengali	Her first Bengali album, only as a backing vocalist.
1998	Boliya Mon 98 (Bihu album)	As a backing vocalist	Assamese	This was her only Assamese bihu album to date.
1998	Pansoi	As a singer	Assamese	
1999	Megha	As a singer	Assamese	
1999	Meghor Boron	As a singer	Assamese	
2000	Sparsh	As a singer and songwriter	Hindi	
2001	Mayabini	As a singer	Assamese	
2001	Nupur	As a singer and lyricist.	Hindi	
2002	Bhool Ja And Other Hits	As a guest backing vocalist	Hindi	

=== Film songs ===
Year	Film	Song	Languages	Music Director(s)	Writer(s)	Co-singer(s)	Ref.
1979	Shaayad	"Khushboo Hoon Main"	Hindi	Manas Mukherjee	Unknown	Mohammed Rafi	
1998	Joubone Amoni Kore	"Ulomi Thakute" (Version 2)	Assamese	Bhupen Uzir	Hemanta Dutta	Solo	
1999	Morom Nadir Gabhoru Gaat	"Tumar Gaon Khoni Dhuniya"	Assamese	Atul Medhi	Unknown	Solo	
1999	Morom Nadir Gabhoru Gaat	"Bukure Bhaxa Mur" (Version 2)	Assamese	Atul Medhi	Unknown	Shaan	
1999	Maharathi	"Oi Mur Axomor Prothom"	Assamese	Manash Hazarika	Unknown	Zubeen Garg, Zublee Baruah	
1999	Maharathi	"Hun Nalage Rup Nalage" (Female Version)	Assamese	Manash Hazarika	Unknown	Solo	
1999	Bhopal Express	"Hum Kaise Log Hai"	Hindi	Shankar–Ehsaan–Loy	Sagarika	Solo	
2000	Hiya Diya Niya	Assamese	Untitled Hidden Track (Background Score)	Zubeen Garg	Zubeen Garg	Shaan, Zubeen Garg	
2000	Tarkieb	"Dil Mera Tarse"	Hindi	Aadesh Shrivastava	Unknown	Shaan	
2000	Nidaan	"Waqt Ki Keemat"	Hindi	Rahul Ranande	Gautam Joglekar	Nandu Bhenade	
2000	Nidaan	"Aaja Re Chanda" (Female)	Hindi	Rahul Ranande	Gautam Joglekar	Solo	
2000	Jon Jole Kopalot	"Hojao Geetare Godhuli"	Assamese	Jayanta Das	Zubeen Garg, Mrinalkanti Medhi	Shaan, Babul Supriyo, Mahalakshmi Iyer	
2000	Jon Jole Kopalot	"Duru Duru Kope"	Assamese	Jayanta Das	Rubul Bora	Shaan	
2000	Bhumiputra	"Nikha Nahe Tupane"	Assamese	Jayanta Das	Rubul Bora	Nirmali Das	
2000	Jogantoror Tezal Pua	"Bujilu Nubujila Urvashi"	Assamese	Debajit Chaudhary	Unknown	Ritu Bikash, Debajit Chaudhary, Aparna Dutta Chaudhary, Shanta Uzir	
2001	Anya Ek Jatra	"Kaale Karhi Nile Sonali Sapun" (Female Version)	Assamese	Rishi Raj Duarah	Dilip Bora	Shaan, Zubeen Garg	
2001	Garam Botah	"Tenekoi Nesaba"	Assamese	Jatin Sharma	Zubeen Garg	Zubeen Garg, Bhitali Das	
2001	Aei Morom Tumar Babe	"Nijanote Bukur Tote" (Female Version)	Assamese	Bhupen Uzir	Unknown	Solo	
2001	Aei Morom Tumar Babe	"Jonake Uposa"	Assamese	Bhupen Uzir	Hemanta Dutta	Shaan	
2001	Aei Morom Tumar Babe	"Rati Ene Rati"	Assamese	Bhupen Uzir	Zubeen Garg	Solo	
2001	Aei Morom Tumar Babe	Untitled Song (Background Score)	Assamese	Bhupen Uzir	Unknown	Shaan	
2001	Nayak	"Mon Ghonot"	Assamese	Zubeen Garg	Zubeen Garg	Shaan, Zubeen Garg, Mahalakshmi Iyer, Pamela Jain	
2002	Eman Morom Kiyo Lage	"Ture Sobi"	Assamese	Manoj Sharma	Zubeen Garg	Zubeen Garg, Shaan	
2002	Danger	"Na Koi Rah Hai"	Hindi	Prasad Sashte	Shailendra Kumar	Nisha, Caralisa Monteiro	
2002	Danger	"Main Hoon Danger"	Hindi	Prasad Sashte	Shailendra Kumar	Whosane	
2002	Danger	"Danger Ek Kharatnak Khel"	Hindi	Prasad Sashte	Shailendra Kumar	Whosane	
2002	Prem Aru Prem	"Sokuwe Sokuwe Sinaki"	Assamese	Zubeen Garg	Zubeen Garg	Zubeen Garg, Jonkey Borthakur, Mahalakshmi Iyer	
2002	Jonaki Mon	"Phule Phule Aji Huoni"	Assamese	Zubeen Garg	Zubeen Garg	Shaan, Zubeen Garg, Arnab, Pamela Jain	
2002	Priya O Priya	"Bohag Mahot Gosor Dalot"	Assamese	Manas Robin	Manas Robin	Zubeen Garg, Kumar Bhabesh, Dilip Fernandez	
2004	Ishq Hai Tumse	"Humko Chahiye"	Hindi	Himesh Reshammiya	Sameer	Shaan	
2004	Shudhu Tumi	"Gun Gun Gunjare"	Bengali	Zubeen Garg	Zubeen Garg	Shreya Ghoshal	
2005	Page 3	"Yahaan Zindagi"	Hindi	Samir Tandon	Sandeep Nath	Shaan, Shabab Samir	
2006	Priyotoma	"Ek Kemon Chhelebela"	Bengali	Jeet Ganguly	Unknown	Solo	
2006	Priyotoma	"Ei Pathe Saath Chalo Na"	Bengali	Jeet Ganguly	Unknown	Shaan, Shreya Ghoshal	
2006	Snehabandhan	"Rod Pore Sutalot" (Female Version)	Assamese	Nanda Banerjee	Unknown	Solo	
2006	Snehabandhan	Untitled Assamese Hidden Song (Background Score)	Assamese	Nanda Banerjee	Unknown	Shaan	
2006	Aami Asomiya	"Oi Moke Nai Lage Re" (Version 2)	Assamese	Zubeen Garg	Zubeen Garg	Shaan	
2011	Hayi Haayiga	"Vollantha Okate"	Telugu	John Christopher	Unknown	Solo	

=== Non-film songs ===
Year	Album	Song	Languages	Composer(s)	Writer(s)	Co-singer(s)	Notes	Ref.
1995	Oorja	Q-Funk	Hindi	Phill and Jerry	Shweta Shetty, Stylebhai, Shaan, Babul Supriyo, Alisha Chinai, Shweta Mohan	Solo		
1995	Oorja	Swing B	Hindi	Phill and Jerry	Shweta Shetty, Pradeep Roy	Solo		
1995	Oorja	Memory Lane	Hindi	Phill and Jerry	Sujatha Mohan	Solo		
1995	Roop Inka Mastana	Roop Tera Mastana	Hindi	Unknown	Unknown	Shaan, Stylebhai		
1995	Roop Inka Mastana	Pholoon Ka Taroon Ka	Hindi	Unknown	Unknown	Solo		
1995	Roop Inka Mastana	Naina Barse	Hindi	Unknown	Unknown	Solo		
1996	Naujawan	Aisa Hota Hai	Hindi	Biddu	Raajesh Johri	Shaan	Reused in Tamil Song called "Paarthal Kanngal".	
1996	Naujawan	Disco Deewane	Hindi	Biddu	Anwar Khalid	Solo	Remastered version which was originally sung by Pakistani singer Nazia Hasan. Also reused in Tamil song called "Paara Ushar".	
1996	Naujawan	Naujawan (Title Song)	Hindi	Biddu	Raajesh Johri	Shaan		
1996	Naujawan	Jhoomi Jani	Hindi	Biddu	Raajesh Johri	Solo		
1996	Naujawan	Armaan Dil Ke	Hindi	Biddu	Raajesh Johri	Solo		
1996	Naujawan	Jaane Kahan Hai	Hindi	Biddu	Raajesh Johri	Solo	Bonus Track only	
1997	Love-Ology	Love-Ology	Hindi	Ram Sampath	Unknown	Shaan		
1997	Love-Ology	"Just baby with Just Good Friend"	Hindi	Ram Sampath	Manohar Iyer	Shaan, Hema Sardesai		
1997	A Reason To Smile	Fifty Fifty	Hindi	Raju Singh	Arun Raj	Shaan		
1998	Pansoi	"Door Duronire Mon Junaki Mon"	Assamese	Zubeen Garg	Zubeen Garg	Zubeen Garg	Background Humming; Also appears in 2002 Assamese film "Jonaki Mon"; Also used in Hindi Version called "Door Yaha Se Door".	
1998	Pansoi	"Sokulore Bhora Nikhati"	Assamese	Zubeen Garg	Zubeen Garg	Zubeen Garg		
1998	Pansoi	"Duru Duru Kope, Mon Bur Kope"	Assamese	Zubeen Garg	Zubeen Garg	Solo		
1998	Maa	"Dhup Mein Chaya Jaise"	Hindi	Salim–Sulaiman	Unknown	Solo	First Solo Album Released	
1998	Maa	Other 5 Unknown Hindi Songs (not currently available on YouTube, JioSaavn, Spotify etc.)	Hindi	Salim–Sulaiman	Unknown	Solo	First Solo Album Released	
1999	Megha	"Mon Uroniya"	Assamese	Dhrubajyoti Phukan	Zubeen Garg	Solo		
1999	Meghor Boron	"Jodihe Jun Tora Nethake" (Version 2)	Assamese	Zubeen Garg	Zubeen Garg	Zubeen Garg		
1999	Meghor Boron	"Purnima Jun Tumi"	Assamese	Zubeen Garg	Zubeen Garg	Zubeen Garg, Udit Narayan, Mahalakshmi Iyer		
2000	Sparsh	"Naam Apna Likh Gaya Hai"	Hindi	Zubeen Garg	Zubeen Garg	Zubeen Garg	Background Humming	
2000	Sparsh	"Kya Hone Laga Mujhe"	Hindi	Zubeen Garg	Zubeen Garg	Zubeen Garg, Mahalaxmi Iyer	Also appears in her album Mere Liye and Zubeen's album Nupur.	
2001	Mere Liye	"Mere Liye" (Title Song)	Hindi	Sagarika	Sagarika	Solo		
2001	Nupur	"Kaisa Dhuan Uth Raha Hai"	Hindi	Zubeen Garg	Zubeen Garg	Zubeen Garg, Anindita Paul		
2001	Gori Teri Aankhen...	"Chali Chali Man Chali"	Hindi	Lucky Ali	Aslam	Lucky Ali, Binjo	Background Humming	
2002	Indradhanu	"Mur Jibonor Akashote"	Assamese	Bijoy Talukdar	Bishnu Prasad Rabha	Zubeen Garg	Background Humming; Original Version Only	
2002	Bhool Ja and Other Hits	Untitled Hidden Song	Hindi	Sagarika	Shaan	Solo		
2003	Dhaani	"Pal"	Urdu	Bilal Maqsood	Anwar Maqsood	Strings		
2004	Tumar Akash	"Kopal Thakay"	Bengali	Shaan	Manas Mukherjee	Solo		
2004	Tumar Akash	"Bujhi Sob"	Bengali	Sagarika	Manas Mukherjee	Solo		

== Filmography ==
=== Films ===
Key
Denotes films that have not yet been released

Year	Films	Language	Role	Note(s)
1986	Shyam Saheb	Bengali		Debut film as a child artist
1988	Sankellu	Telugu		
1996	Biyer Phool	Bengali		Debut film as adult role
1999	Morom Nodir Gabhoru Gaat	Assamese	Chorus	Unseen footage
2000	Tarkieb	Hindi	Special appearances in the song "Dil Mera Tarse".	
2001	Mone Bisare Tumak	Assamese		Unreleased film
2002	Prem Aru Prem	Assamese	Cameo	
2002	Jonaki Mon	Assamese	Cameo	
2004	Inteqam: The Perfect Game	Hindi		
2005	Page 3	Hindi	Special appearances	Unseen footage
2007	Kalishankar	Bengali	Tithi	
2007	Life in a Metro	Hindi	Supporting role	Unseen footage

=== Televisions ===
Year	TV Channel	Show(s)	Role	Language	Notes
1996	Channel V	Channel V Music Awards	Guest Host	English, Mandarin Chinese, Hindi	Her first on-screen television appearances
1998	MTV India	MTV Most Wanted	Special guest	English, Hindi	Her second television on-screen appearance occurred during interview with then MTV VJ Raageshwari.
1998	Zee TV	Antakshari	Mentor	Hindi	
2002	SET India	Kuch Kehti Hai Ye Dhun	Guest performer	Hindi	Indian musical gaming show
2002	Zee TV	Sa Re Ga Ma Pa	Guest judge	Hindi	
2004	Zee TV	Sa Re Ga Ma Pa	Guest judge	Hindi	
2004	Zee TV	Antakshari	Co-Host	Hindi	

=== Music videos ===
Year	Song(s)	Role	Singer(s)	Album	Notes	Ref
1998	"Yuhi Kabhi Mila Karo"		Zubeen Garg	Yuhi Kabhi		
1999	"Tanha Dil Tanha Safar"	Herself	Shaan	Tanha Dil	Special appearance Also appears in the film 99.9FM	
2001	"Kaisa Dhuan Uth Raha Hai"	Herself	Anindita Paul	Nupur		

== As a composer ==
Year	Album	Language	Notes
2000	Sparsh	Hindi	First Music Composer debuts with 2 songs but rest of all songs were composed by Zubeen Garg
2001	Mere Liye	Hindi	
2004	Tumar Akash	Bengali	
2006	It's All About Love	Hindi	

== As a songwriter ==
Year	Album	Notes
1996	Channel Hits	
1997	Party Zone	
1997	A reason to smile	
1998	The Ultimate Party Album	
2000	Sparsh	
2001	Mere Liye	
2001	Nupur	
2002	Hitz Unlimited	
2006	It's All About Love	

== Awards and nominations ==
Following are the list of awards and nominations in different categories.

Year	Category	Song	Result
Screen Awards
1996	Best Music Video	"Q-Funk"	Nominated
1997	Best Indian Pop Artists	"Aisa Hota Hai"	Won
Channel V Asia Music Awards
1996	Best Indian Pop Songs	"Q-Funk"	Nominated
1997	Best Female Pop Artist	"Disco Deewane"	Nominated
1999	Best Female Pop Artist	"Dhoop Mein Chaya Jaise"	Nominated
MTV Awards
1996	Best Remix Song	"Q-Funk"	Won
MTV Asia Music Awards
2002	Best Favorite Artist in India		Nominated
Aparjita Awards
2019	You Shine Ingenuity		Won
