= Bharaghar =

- ভাড়াঘৰ
- Genre: Sitcom
- Directed by: Mridul Bhuyan (2012 - 2014), Rajesh Bhuyan (2014 - 2015), Inu Barua (2016 - 2018), Rajiv Borthakur (2019)
- Starring: Jayanta Das, Dulal Bezbarua
- Opening theme: Bharaghar
- Country of origin: India
- Original language: Assamese
- No. of seasons: 3
- No. of episodes: 1446

Production
- Production locations: Guwahati, Assam
- Running time: 21 minutes
- Production company: Pride East Entertainment Pvt. Ltd.

Original release
- Network: Rang
- Release: 26 November 2012 – 16 November 2019

Bharaghar (Assamese for 'rent house') is an Assamese-language Indian television sitcom. It is the first Assamese series to adapt season system of run instead of continuous run. It is one of the three longest running comedy series in Rang, the others being Borola Kai and Oi Khapla.

== Premise ==
The story of the serial revolves around a family (The Kakotis) who have given rent to various people in their housing complex in Guwahati and the events that happen with them or families of various tenants, the plot of Bharaghar is mainly comic and also encompasses the lives of a few neighbours. The different plots are actually a broader reflection of the urban Assamese society.

== Seasons ==
| Season | No. of episodes | Originally broadcast (India) | |
| Season | No. of episodes | First aired | Last aired |
|---|---|---|---|
| 1 | 500 | 26 November 2012 | 2015 |
| 2 | 700 | 13 July 2015 | 21 January 2018 |
| 3 | 246 | 4 February 2019 | 16 November 2019 |

== Characters ==
=== Main ===
- Hemanta Kakoti, played by Jayanta Das, is the owner of the house. He works in government job and is a kind-hearted person but also jokes very much.
- Kamala Houkadhara Kakoti, played by Sagarika Goswami, is wife of Hemanta Kakoti. She was a former dancer and a member of Kanaklata Mahila Samiti. She is the heaviest member of the family.
- Moon Kakoti, played by Debashish Borthakur, is the son of Hemanta and Kamala Kakoti. He was unemployed earlier, but later gets a job in the state government.
- Juri Kakoti, played by Tehsin Akhtar, is the daughter of Kamala and Hemanta and Kakoti younger sister of Moon Kakoti. She is shortest in the family in height and is married and lives in Mumbai.
- Sandhya, is Moon's wife. She is the daughter of a Hemanta's childhood friend.
- Brajen Keout, played by Dulal Bezbaruah, is a friend of Hemanta. He is a cunning person and tries to do something bad for the Kakotis. He now lives Sadiya after transfer.
- Mr. Bora, is also a friend of Hemanta. He is also a kind-hearted man and a good friend of the Kakotis.
- Ms. Bora or Borani (in Assamese) is wife of Mr. Bora and also a friend of Kamala. Mr. Bora is always afraid of her and he do all the household chores in fear.
- Ms. Brahma or Brahmani (in Assamese), played by Mina Ingti, is a friend of Kamala and Borani. She is a kind-hearted lady and seen laughing loudly on jokes with Borani. She speaks in Bodo ascent.
- Kalita Police, played by Manmath Barua, is a traffic police is a tenant of the Kakotis. He is the longest living tenant in the house. He speaks in Dhekri ascent.
- Deepak, is a tenant of the Kakotis. He is younger than Moon and claims to be a Cotton College student. He calls Kamala as 'Ba' (Assamese for elder sister) and calls Kalita Police as 'LG Da' (LG means local guardian).
- Mr. Nath, is a friend of Hemanta. He is a bad minded person and always thinks bad of others and also spread rumours.
- Ms. Sharma or Sharmani (in Assamese), is a friend of Kamala. She is a cunning lady and always jealous of Kamala.
- Kakoti's Father, played by Jayanta Das (Double Role) is father of Hemanta. He lives in the village and sometimes visit Guwahati.
- Borobabu (or Patrobabu), a head clerk in Moon's office.
- Hemanta's office friend. He is Hemanta's colleague.
- Moon's office friend. He is a peon in Moon's office and always seen roaming and chatting with Moon during breaktime.
- A. Dutta, is Moon's boss and officer in his office. He is very kind and good and treats Moon like his brother.
- Archana, is Moon and Juri's cousin sister. She is seen busy in her phone.
- Paban, is Sandhya's step-brother. He is of Moon's age and good with Kalita Police.
- Moon's friends

=== Other characters ===
Other characters include Kamala's father, Kakoti's elder brothers and a sister, Hatimuriya, Chandini, Deepak's brother, etc. They have appeared in some episodes.

In Rang TV's special anniversary episode in 2016, the main characters of the other running serials (Borola Kai, Oi Khapla and Abelir Raamdhenu) came to Guwahati and then circumstances made them to visit the Kakotis. It was just like other episodes but not related to the previous episode.

Other notable characters who have appeared as cameo include notable late actor Biju Phukan, musician Jyoti Prakash Das (J P Das), and popular actress Borsha Rani Bishoya.

== Filming locations ==
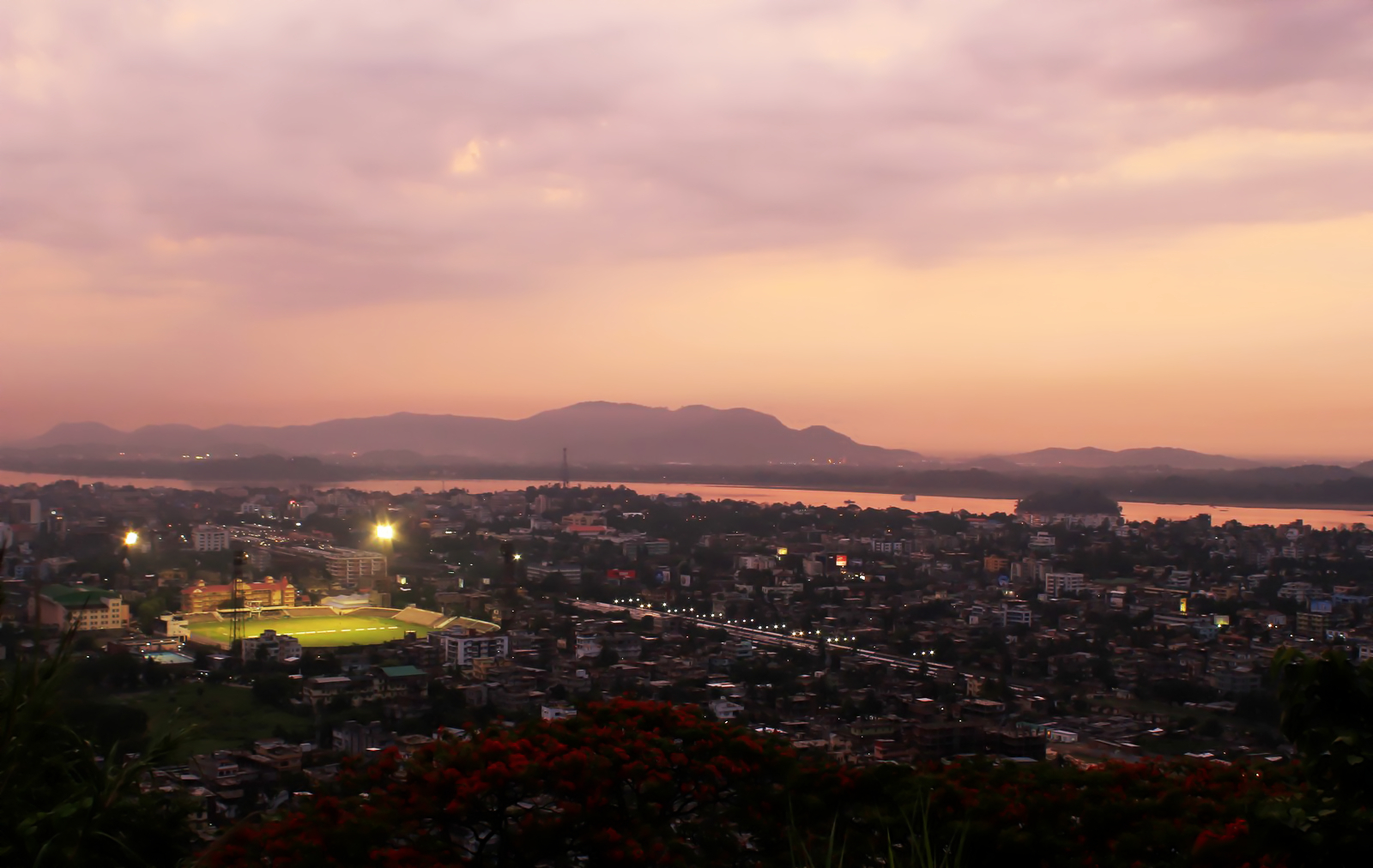
Guwahati, where Bharaghar is shot

The episodes are mainly shot in Guwahati, Dispur and outskirts of Guwahati.

=== Locations referred ===
This includes the locations which were referred in Bharaghar. These locations are fictional. It includes:

- Kakotis' village.
- Alengmora, home village/town of Sandhya situated somewhere near Charaideo district.
- Madhya Gorumara, Deepak's village/town situated somewhere in Jorhat district.
- Various locations referred by other characters.

== Facts ==
- The first part of Bharaghar started in somewhere between 2012 and 2013. It has more than 500 episodes.
- The second part was started after a gap of almost one year. It has more than 700 episodes making the total no. of episodes exceeding 1200.
- The first tenant in Bharaghar were two young boys.
- The housing complex has 5 rent houses (bharaghars).
- Kakotis earlier lived in the smaller house (in first part) present on the left side of their current house.
- Bharagar was the first serial in Northeast India to cross 400 episodes.
- Beharbari Outpost of Rengoni can be said as Bharaghar's rival comedy serial.
- Tara, daughter of her village head was the last tenant in Bharghar.
- The housing complex, where Bharaghar is shot is used by Rang TV and its sister news channel News Live for Bihu-special programs.

== Series end ==
Second season of Bharaghar came to an end with its last episode (Episode 777) airing on 20 January 2018. The serial is succeeded by a new comedy serial Bah Amarabati Bah, which will start from the following week. Following are some circumstances which happened in last few episodes:

- Deepak returning to Madhya Gorumara to see his ailing father.
- Moon's transfer to newly formed district Charaideo. He and his wife are going to live there.
- Kalita Police's promotion and transfer.
- Mr. Bora going to his in-laws' house to meet his wife, who was living there from last few months.
- Kakoti's father returning to his village.

== Bharaghar Returns ==
Bharaghar is again scheduled to run from 4 February 2019 with new episodes with new stories.

== See also ==
- Ardhangini (2017 TV series)
