= Raamdhenu =

- Promotional poster of Raamdhenu
- Directed by: Munin Barua
- Produced by: Pride East Entertainments Pvt. Ltd.
- Starring: Jatin Bora; Prastuti Porasor; Utpal Das; Nishita Goswami; Bishnu Kharghoria; Tapan Das; Bidyut Chakrabarty
- Cinematography: Suman Duwarah
- Edited by: A. Sreekar Prasad
- Music by: Jatin Sharma
- Production company: Pride East Entertainments Pvt. Ltd.
- Release date: 4 February 2011
- Country: India
- Language: Assamese

Raamdhenu (English: Rainbow) is a 2011 Indian Assamese romantic drama film directed by veteran Munin Barua and produced by Pride East Entertainments Private Limited. It stars an ensemble cast of Jatin Bora, Prastuti Porasor, Tapan Das, Utpal Das and Nishita Goswami in the lead roles. The film was released in 24 cinema halls across Assam on 4 February 2011. The music is composed by Jatin Sharma.

Raamdhenu was commercially hit in the box office. The songs in this film are sung by popular singers like Zubeen Garg, Angaraag Mahanta, Dikshu, Zublee, Shreya Ghoshal, Raaj J Konwar, Rupjyoti and Sunidhi Chauhan.

== Synopsis ==
It is a story of few characters who suffered many challenges in their life. Difficult circumstances and adversities invade the lives of the characters in the film who deal with the circumstances bravely and endeavour to establish stability in their lives. The story revolves around the lives of 7 individuals, whose lives and it's adversities intersect with each other. 7 individuals, 7 different stories also mean the 7 colours, which come together into becoming Raamdhenu (Rainbow).

== Cast ==
- Jatin Bora as Arjun
- Prastuti Porasor as Mandira Kakoti
- Jayanta Das as Nooruddin Ali Ahmed Hazarika
- Utpal Das as Rajiv
- Nishita Goswami as Pooja
- Bishnu Kharghoria as Landlord
- Tapan Das as Ajoy Shankar Baruah
- Bidyut Chakrabarty as Sanjeev Dutta
- Pakeeza Begum
- Pabitra Baruah

== Soundtrack ==
Raamdhenu

Soundtrack album by Jatin Sharma
- Released: January 2011
- Recorded: 2011
- Genre: Feature film soundtrack
- Length: 42:28
- Language: Assamese
- Producer: NK Production; Pride East Entertainments Pvt. Ltd.

The music of Raamdhenu is composed by Jatin Sharma. The songs of Raamdhenu were huge hit. Singers from Bollywood like Shreya Ghoshal and Sunidhi Chauhan lent their voices in this film.

Tracklist
No.	Title	Lyrics	Music	Artist(s)	Length
1.	"Tupi Tupi"	Ibson Lal Baruah	Jatin Sharma	Sunidhi Chauhan, Zubeen Garg	5:06
2.	"Rang Diya Morom"	Diganta Bharati	Jatin Sharma	Zubeen Garg, Shreya Ghoshal	5:28
3.	"Tumi Diya"	Ibson Lal Baruah	Jatin Sharma	Dikshu, Zublee	5:27
4.	"Ujai Jai Noi"	Ibson Lal Baruah	Jatin Sharma	Angaraag Mahanta	5:30
5.	"Asta Aakaxote"	Ibson Lal Baruah	Jatin Sharma	Raaj J Konwar	4:54
6.	"Raamdhenu"	Ibson Lal Baruah	Jatin Sharma	Angaraag Mahanta	5:43
7.	"Aahori Hobone"	Diganta Bharati	Jatin Sharma	Dikshu	4:55
8.	"Uposi Pore"	Ibson Lal Baruah	Jatin Sharma	Rupjyoti, Sharat	5:25
Total length:					42:28
