= Jayanta Das =

Indian actor and director (1960–2023)

- Born: 8 June 1969; Guwahati, Assam, India
- Died: 16 December 2023 (aged 54); Guwahati, Assam, India
- Occupations: Actor, director

Jayanta Das (8 June 1969 – 16 December 2023) was an Indian actor and director, best known for his role in Raamdhenu.

== Early life ==
Jayant Das was born on 8 June 1969 in Guwahati, India to father Pulin Chandra Das and mother Tamal Kusum Das, a school teacher. He attended Latasil Primary School, and later earned a degree from Cotton College. Although not interested in acting as a child, he appeared in his first play at a young age at the behest of actor and writer Amulya Kakati.

== Career ==
Das' first role was in Pulak Gogoi's film Xendur, followed by Xakuntala. While most of his early roles were that of villains, he was later cast in comedic parts. From 2012 to 2019, Das appeared as the main character in the television sitcom Bharaghar.

== Death ==
Das died after suffering from liver problems in Guwahati, on 16 December 2023, at the age of 54.

== Filmography ==
=== Films ===
Year	Film(s)	Role	Notes	Ref
1999	Bukur Majot Jole			
2000	Jon Jole Kopalot			
2000	Bhumiputra			
2001	Nayak			
2002	Kanyadaan			
2002	Jonaki Mon			
2002	Mon			
2004	Kadambari			
2006	Moina Sorai Moina Maat			
2008	Jonaki Mon			
2010	Udaan			
2011	Raamdhenu			
2012	Gattu	Principal		
2013	Madras Cafe			
2014	Adomya			
2015	KHEL:The Game			

=== Television Serial ===
Year	TV Serial(s)	Role	Notes	Channel	Ref
2013	Bharaghar	Hemanta Kakoty		Rang	
