= Hepaah =

- Soundtrack cassette cover
- Directed by: Shankar Borua
- Starring: Biju Phukan; Jatin Bora; Geetawali Rajkumari
- Music by: Jitul Sonowal
- Production company: Mothiasiga Pictures
- Release date: 19 December 2003
- Running time: 130 minutes
- Country: India
- Language: Assamese

Hepaah (All those longings…, lit. Yearning) is a 2003 Assamese musical drama film directed by Shankar Borua and produced by Mothiasiga Pictures. The story of the film revolves round the rise of a ragtag band, Hepaah, of small-town musicians and tells the story of hope and frustration of the young generation against the "politically turbulent backdrop" of Assam. The film stars Biju Phukan, Jatin Bora, Geetawali Rajkumari in the lead roles and was released on 19 December 2003.

== Plot ==
The story of Hepaah revolves round the rise of a ragtag band of five young small-town musicians against the backdrop of "politically turbulent" Assam. The five musicians plan to launch their band at a concert. A middle-aged man, Kakati (Biju Phukan), who owns a furniture shop, comes to help them out. With his help and patronage, the boys hold successful shows and eventually Kakati becomes the mentor of the band and named it "Hepaah".

The band succeeds to gain popularity and accolades among masses. But before things can take concrete shape, there comes a rich man, with the proposal of producing an audio album of them. The huge commercial success of the album brings money and means to the group, alleviating their day-to-day hardship.

They begin to lose their commitment to music. Kakati, disillusioned by their attitude, decides to leave them to their fate. But before everything goes out of control, the troupe members make a last effort to hold on to their ideals. But it is already too late. Nothing materializes in the end, only their aspirations, desires remained unfulfilled.

== Cast ==
- Biju Phukan as Kakati
- Jatin Bora
- Geetawali Rajkumari
- Gaurav Bania
- Joy Kashyap
- Sanjeev Hazarika

== Production ==
Hepaah is the first fictional feature directed by Shankar Borua, who previously directed several critically acclaimed documentaries. According to Barua, he is trying to give a "fresh new look to Assamese filmmaking" with Hepaah. He used to hero-worship Biju Phukan since childhood and wrote the script of the film with the veteran actor in mind. Phukan was also impressed by the very bold and different subject matter of Hepaah and immediately accepted the offer.

Work on the music of the film started in March 2003, while filming began in May 2003. Filming completed just in 24 days.

== Music ==
The music of the film was composed by Jitul Sonowal. The lyrics were penned by Nirmal Prabha Bordoloi and Nalini Mahanta Dutta, and features vocal of Jitul Sonowal, Tarali Sarma and Rishiraj Sharma. The soundtrack album was released on 9 June 2003 at Pandit Tirthanath Sarma Sabhaghar in Chandmari, Guwahati.

== Release and reception ==
Hepaah was released in Assam on 19 December 2003. The film mostly got positive review, however it was not a commercial success. Barua was praised for unusual content selection, cinematography and lighting, but the disjointed script was criticized. Music of the film was also highly praised.
