= Ravi Sarma =

Indian film actor (born 1972)

- Born: 19 September 1972; Guwahati, Assam, India
- Occupations: Actor, Script Writer, Bodybuilder, Model (person)
- Years active: 2000–present
- Spouse: Maitreyee Priyadarshini

Ravi Sarma is an Indian actor who works in Assamese cinema. He hasstarred in films like Hiya Diya Niya, Tumi Aahibaane, Nayak, Sri Raghupati etc.

== Career ==
Ravi Sarma's debut Assamese film was Hiya Diya Niya (2000) directed by Munin Barua. He then went on acting in Tumi Aahibaane (2017) directed by Prerana Barbarooah, Poley Poley Urey Mon (2011) directed by Timothy Das, Sri Raghupati (2023) directed by Suvrat Kakoti etc. He has also acted in many mobile theatres of Assam. At present, he is associated with Hengool Theatre.

== Filmography ==
=== Film ===
Year	Film	Director
2000	Hiya Diya Niya	Munin Barua
2001	Anya Ek Jatra	Monju Baruah
2001	Nayak	Munin Barua
2002	Kokadeutar Gharjonwai	Suman Haripriya
2002	Mon	Boni Das
2002	Iman Morom Kiyo Lage	Alak Nath
2003	Soru Bowari	Sokradhar Deka
2003	Ujonir Dujoni Gabhoru	Chondro Moodoi
2004	Bukuwe Bisare	Deepankor Kashyop
2004	Anuraag	Beedyut Chokrovarty
2004	Barood	Munin Barua
2004	Maa Tumi Ananya	Muna Ahmed
2005	Hiyar Dapunot Tumare Sobi	Chibanan Baroah
2005	Jeevan Trishna	Arup Mana
2006	Aami Asomiya	Rajib Bhattacharya
2006	Deuta Diya Bidai	Ramesh
2011	Poley Poley Urey Mon	Timothi Das
2013	Rananggan	Pronob Jyoti Bhorali
2017	Tumi Aahibane	Prerana Barbarooah
2020	Pepper Chicken	Roton Sarma
2023	Black N White	Dhonjit Das
2023	Sri Raghupati	Suvrat Kakoti
2025	Rudra	Roopak Gogoi
2025	Moksh	Mirza Arif Hazarika
2026	Agnibaan	Mrinmoy Arjun Saikia
2026	Oii Police	Suvrat Kakoti
TBA	Dhwaja	Shahnawaz Rahman

=== Short film/web series ===
Year	Title	Role	Network	Note
2020	Illegal		Niri9	
2020	Hope			
2021	Sorry	Ravi		

=== Portrayal in films ===
Year	Film Title	Language	Portrayal by	Notes
2025	Bhaimon Da	Assamese	Jay Saikia	Biographical film about Munin Barua

== Political life ==
Ravi Sarma has joined Bharatiya Janata Party on 2 August 2019. He resigned from Bharatiya Janata Party to protest against the Centre’s move immediately after the Citizenship (Amendment) Bill, 2019, was tabled in the Lok Sabha on 9 December 2019.
