= Mridula Baruah =

Indian actresses

- Born: 14 April; Sotia, Sonitpur district, Assam,
- Occupation: Acting
- Years active: 1978–present
- Organization: Assamese film industry
- Parent: Jogendranath Baruah
- Awards: Lifetime Achievement Award; Veerangana Mulagabharu Award; Assam State Film Award

Mridula Baruah is an actress in the Assamese film industry. Besides films, Mridula Baruah has acted in more than 30 VCD films, several Hindi and Assamese television series, and telefilms. In 2000, she debuted as a producer, producing a couple of serials for Doordarshan. She also produced several documentaries for the Government of Assam.

For her valuable contributions to the Assamese film industry, Mridula Baruah was awarded the Lifetime Achievement Award in 2021 by the socio-cultural organization Asom Star.

== Early life ==
Mridula Baruah was born in Assam, in the Sonitpur district's Sotia. Her father, Jogendranath Baruah, worked as the Outdoor In-Charge of the Pratapgarh Tea Estate. Later, her parents moved to Biswanath Chariali with their six children.

== Entry into acting ==
While studying in 10th grade at Sotia's school, Mridula Baruah participated in a school drama competition for the first time, winning third prize. During her college days, she participated in the All-Assam Surya Bora Memorial One-Act Play competition, where she won first prize for acting. Her talent was discovered by film director and actor Abdul Majid, opening the door to her career in Assamese cinema.

== Film career ==
Mridula Baruah’s acting career began with the film Upapath, directed by Hemanta Dutta and produced by Pramod Baruah. Around the same time, director Dwijendra Narayan Dev was searching for a new actress for his film Moromi. Actor Hiren Choudhury introduced him to Mridula Baruah, who was eventually cast in the lead role. Thus, while still in college, she got the opportunity to act in lead roles in two films. Although Upapath (1980) was her first acting project, Moromi (1978) was released earlier, making it her debut film.

In 1979, her film Megh Mukti was released, where she played dual roles as twin sisters. It was the first Assamese film featuring dual roles. Subsequently, she delivered hits like Bowari (1982) and Kokadeuta Nati aru Hati (1983), establishing herself as a versatile actress. Later, films like Maa (1986) and Pratima (1987), where she portrayed older female characters, added to her acclaim.

Throughout her acting career, she played a wide range of roles, from innocent rural girls to negative characters like in Hiya Diya Niya (2000). She also appeared in Bhupen Hazarika's Hindi film Kalsandhya (1997) as a guest artist with a slightly negative role. Her performances in films like Aawaran (1993), Itihas (1996), and Gun Gun Gane Gane (2002) received critical acclaim.

Besides films, Mridula Baruah has acted in more than 30 VCD films, several Hindi and Assamese television serials, and telefilms.

== Production ==
In 2000, she debuted as a producer, producing two serials for Doordarshan. She also produced around ten documentaries for the Government of Assam.

== Awards and recognitions ==
- Best Actress, 1984 (By Assam Artist Association), Film: Kokadeuta Nati aru Hati
- Best Supporting Actress, 1987 (By Eastern India Motion Pictures), Film: Maa
- Best Supporting Actress, 2005 (Assam State Film Award)
- Lifetime Achievement Award, 2021 (By Asom Star)

== Filmography ==
- Kadambari
- Hepah (2003)
- Kanyadan (2002)
- Tumi Mor Matho Mor (2000)
- Hiya Diya Niya (2000)
- Itihas (1996)
- Sarathi (1992)
- Drishti (1990)
- Bhai-Bhai (1989)
- Arati (1986)
- Moromi (1978)
