= Majgaon =

- Town
- Location in Assam, India Majgaon (India)
- Coordinates: 26.630043°N 92.079849°E
- Country: India
- State: Assam
- District: Sonitpur

Population (2001)
  - Total: 6,820

Languages
  - Official: Assamese
- Time zone: UTC+5:30 (IST)
- Vehicle registration: AS

Majgaon is a census town in Sonitpur district in the Indian state of Assam.

== Demographics ==
As of 2001 India census, Majgaon had a population of 6820. Males constitute 52% of the population and females 48%. Majgaon has an average literacy rate of 83%, higher than the national average of 59.5%: male literacy is 83%, and female literacy is 83%. In Majgaon, 9% of the population is under 6 years of age.
