= Bhitali Das =

Indian singer (1969–2021)

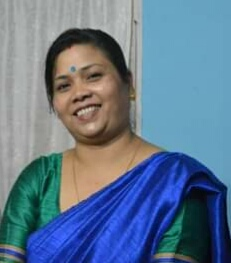

Background information
- Born: 6 June 1969; Majgaon, Assam, India
- Died: 21 April 2021 (aged 51) Guwahati, India
- Genres: Folk; Pop
- Occupation: Singer
- Instrument: Vocals
- Years active: 1992–2021
- Labels: NK Production; Magnasound Records; Regional Music Centre

Bhitali Das (6 June 1969 – 21 April 2021) was an Indian singer.

She sang over 5,000 Bihu songs with various artists including Zubeen Garg, Anindita Paul, Tarali Sarma etc. She made several Bihusuriya albums.

== Early life ==
Bhitali Das was born at Majgaon, Tezpur, Sonitpur. She studied in the Senairam Higher Secondary and Multipurpose School.

== Career ==
Bhitali Das sung more than 3000 Assamese songs with singer Zubeen Garg. Bhitali Das's popular album include Jonbai, Rangdhali, Bogitora, and Enajori.

== Death ==
On 14 April 2020, Bhitali Das was infected with COVID-19 and was admitted to Guwahati's Kalapahar COVID care centre. On 21 April, she was in a critical condition from complications of COVID-19 and shifted to the Intensive Care Unit (ICU).

Bhitali Das died aged 51 on 21 April at the Kalapahar COVID care centre.
