= Arnab Chakrabarty =

- Born: 19 September 1980 (age 46)
- Origin: Bombay, Maharashtra, India
- Genre: Indian classical music
- Occupations: Sarod player, teacher
- Instrument: Sarod
- Website: sarod.ca

Arnab Chakrabarty (born 19 September 1980) is a Hindustani classical musician and sarod player based in Toronto, Canada.

== Early life and education ==
Arnab Chakrabarty grew up in Mumbai, where his father was a professor of chemistry at the Indian Institute of Technology. His tutelage commenced under the sarod exponent Brij Narayan, disciple of his father the sarangi Pandit Ram Narayan and also Ustad Ali Akbar Khan of the Seniya Maihar Gharana. Arnab subsequently trained under Pandit Buddhadev Das Gupta of the Shahjahanpur Gharana.

Arnab studied ethnomusicology and international relations at Hampshire College as a scholarship student, graduating in 2002. This experience exposed him to other traditions of music, and led him to experiment with new ideas in sarod construction and design, as well as musical idioms.

== Subsequent tutelage and influences ==
Arnab's early training followed the Maihar and Shahjahanpur schools, which both derived from the Senia idiom founded by the legendary Mian Tansen. However, he has long been influenced by the vocalism-inspired style of the Etawah Gharana, which was taken to new heights by Ustad Vilayat Khan. Chakrabarty continues an extended period of part-tutelage part-collaboration with Vinayak Chittar of this Gharana. He has also studied with a number of vocalists of the Agra and Gwalior Gharanas, notably Yeshwantbua Joshi.

Chakrabarty had reverted to training under a master of the Shahjahanpur Gharana, Kalyan Mukherjea, until Mukherjea's death in March 2010. He has received several dozen traditional sarod compositions from the Lucknow-Shahjahanpur Gharana master, Ustad Irfan Muhammad Khan.

== Performative career ==
Arnab has had several significant concerts. He made his solo debut in 1994, and won the National Collegiate Competition for Music and Dance three years in a row between 1995 and 1997. In 1999 he performed before Dr Kofi Annan, then the United Nations Secretary General, a memorial programme for the Pakistani peace activist Eqbal Ahmed. Notable performances at home include recitals at the Saptak Festival in Ahmedabad; the Uttarpara Music Conference, Kolkata; and concerts at the Nehru Centre and the National Centre for the Performing Arts.
