= Hemanta Dutta =

Indian Assamese dramatist, actor and director (1941–2025)

- Born: Hemanta Dutta; 24 September 1941; Kharupetia, Mangaldai, Dist Darrang, Assam Province, British India
- Died: 11 August 2025 (aged 83); Guwahati, Assam, India
- Occupations: Dramatist, director, actor, lyricist
- Writing career
- Notable awards: Bhaben Baruah Award, 2017

Hemanta Dutta (24 September 1941 – 11 August 2025) was an Indian Assamese dramatist, film director and lyricist. Dutta was conferred with the Bhaben Baruah Award in 2017.

== Awards and nominations ==
Title of ‘Natyasindhu’

- Bhaben Baruah Award, 2017 conferred on Hemanta Dutta
- Assam Saurabh Award, 2024 conferred on Hemanta Dutta

== Death ==
Dutta died on 11 August 2025, at the age of 83.

== List of plays ==
| Season | Play | Playwright | Starring |
|---|---|---|---|
| 2010–2011 | Eta Nasta Lorar Galpa | Hemanta Dutta | Nayan Nilim, Rimpi Das, Hiren Medhi, Dulumoni Deka etc. |
| 2010–2011 | Kohinoor, Nohoi Mathu Eti heera | Abhijeet Bhattacharya | Nayan Nilim, Rimpi Das, Hiren Medhi, Dulumoni Deka etc. |
| 2010–2011 | Rumal | Abhijeet Bhattacharya | Nayan Nilim, Rimpi Das, Hiren Medhi, Dulumoni Deka etc. |
| 2011–2012 | Bhal Pau Buli Nokoba | Abhijeet Bhattacharya | Barsha Rani Bishaya, Dibyajyoti Das, Franky, Hiren Medhi, Dulumoni Deka etc. |
| 2011–2012 | Kopouphul | Abhijeet Bhattacharya | Barsha Rani Bishaya, Dibyajyoti Das, Franky, Hiren Medhi, Dulumoni Deka etc. |
| 2011–2012 | Path | Hemanta Dutta | Barsha Rani Bishaya, Dibyajyoti Das, Franky, Hiren Medhi, Dulumoni Deka etc. |
| 2011–2012 | Titanic | Hemanta Dutta | Barsha Rani Bishaya, Dibyajyoti Das, Franky, Hiren Medhi, Dulumoni Deka etc. |
| 2012–2013 | Erabator Sur | Abhijeet Bhattacharya | Tapan Das, Angoorlata, Tushar Pritam, Hiren Medhi, Dulumoni Deka etc. |
| 2012–2013 | Jed | Abhijeet Bhattacharya | Tapan Das, Angoorlata, Tushar Pritam, Hiren Medhi, Dulumoni Deka etc. |
| 2012–2013 | Hiyar Epahi Gulap | Abhijeet Bhattacharya | Tapan Das, Angoorlata, Tushar Pritam, Hiren Medhi, Dulumoni Deka etc. |
| 2012–2013 | Hendur | Hemanta Dutta | Tapan Das, Angoorlata, Tushar Pritam, Hiren Medhi, Dulumoni Deka etc. |
| 2013–2014 | Devdas | Abhijeet Bhattacharya | Tapan Das, Moonmi Phukan etc. |
| 2013–2014 | Edin Tumi Ahibay | Abhijeet Bhattacharya | Tapan Das, Moonmi Phukan etc. |
| 2013–2014 | Akakhor Dore Mon | Hemanta Dutta | Tapan Das, Moonmi Phukan etc. |
| 2014–2015 | Moromor Jui | Abhijeet Bhattacharya | Rajkumar, Moonmi Phukan, Chinmoy Kotoky etc. |
| 2014–2015 | Footpathor Romeo | Abhijeet Bhattacharya | Rajkumar, Moonmi Phukan, Chinmoy Kotoky etc. |
| 2014–2015 | Mukti | Hemanta Dutta | Rajkumar, Moonmi Phukan, Chinmoy Kotoky etc. |
| 2015–2016 | DSP Durga | Abhijeet Bhattacharya | Moytreyee Priyadarshini, Dibyajyoti Das, Mahesh Bora etc. |
| 2015–2016 | Chakrabehu | Hemanta Dutta | Moytreyee Priyadarshini, Dibyajyoti Das, Mahesh Bora etc. |
| 2015–2016 | Gupute Gupute | Bhaskar Barman | Moytreyee Priyadarshini, Dibyajyoti Das, Mahesh Bora etc. |
