= Munin Barua =

Indian film director

- Born: 5 November 1946; Khumtai, Golaghat, Assam, British India
- Died: 7 April 2018 (aged 71); Guwahati, Assam, India
- Occupations: Film director, filmmaker, script writer
- Years active: Mid 70–2018
- Notable work: Pita-Putro, Hiya Diya Niya, Nayak, Dinabandhu
- Spouse: Manjula Barua
- Children: Manas and Puja

Munin Barua (5 November 1946 – 7 April 2018) popularly known as Bhaimon Da was an Indian film director in Assamese cinema industry. Among his best-known films are Pita-Putro, Prabhati Pokhir Gaan, Hiya Diya Niya, Daag, Nayak and Bidhata. Barua is widely regarded in Assam to have been one of the directors who helped popularize and establish Assamese cinema outside the state, primarily elsewhere in India where other industries had historically dominated. In 2000, his film Hiya Diya Niya became a first 'blockbuster hit' in Assamese cinema, which helped to revive the Assamese film industry. His another film Dinabandhoo received National Film Award for Best Feature Film in Assamese in 2005. He died on 7 April 2018, at the age of 71 in Guwahati.

== Early life ==
Barua was born in 1946 at Khumtai in Golaghat district, Assam. His father late Hemendra Nath Barua was the mouzadar in Khumtai mouza and mother was Latika Barua. He was the youngest in his family.

== Personal life ==
He married Manjula Barua of Jorhat in December 1974. Manjula Barua is an actress as well as a costume designer in Assamese film industry. They have two children, Manas and Puja. Son Manas Barua is also a film director.

== Career ==
Munin Barua started his career in Assamese cinema as a scriptwriter and assistant director in mid 70's. He has written scripts for 21 films, which include Bowari, Ghar-Sansar, Sonmoina, Mon-Mandir, Sewali, Daag, Barood, Rong, Maya, Bidhata etc. He has worked as assistant director for Shiva Prasad Thakur's films Bowari, Ghar-Sansar and Sonmoina. Barua made his directorial debut jointly with Nipon Goswami in the 1987 movie Pratima . He has also written scripts in many plays of mobile theatres. Apart from movies Barua also directed television serials like - Papu Nikur Xongbad and Rudra (Telefilm).

== Filmography ==
=== Direction ===
Title	Year	Producer
Pratima	1987	Paresh Das
Pita Putro	1988	Amar Nath Tiwari, Vijay Narayan Tiwari
Pahari Kanya	1990	Hills Cine Association, Diphu
Prabhati Pokhir Gaan	1992	Amar Nath Tiwari, Vijay Narayan Tiwari
Hiya Diya Niya	2000	Merry Laskar
Daag	2001	Nilotpal Choudhury
Nayak	2001	Merry Laskar
Kanyadaan	2002	C.S. Narayan, Swaraj Das
Bidhata	2003	C.S. Narayan, Swaraj Das
Barood	2003	Merry Laskar
Rong	2004	C.S. Narayan, Swaraj Das
Dinabandhu	2004	Krishna Roy, Gopal Jalan
Raamdhenu	2011	Pride East Entertainments Pvt. Ltd.
Priyaar Priyo	2017	Abdul Mannan Faruk

== Awards and achievements ==
Films	Year	Category
Nayak	2001-02	State Award for Best Director
Barood	2003-04	Best film
Dinabandhu	2004	National Film Award for Best Feature Film in Assamese

Munin Barua was conferred Roopkar Award, instituted in memory of late film critic and editor Pabitra Kumar Deka, for the year 2013 for his contribution to the film and theatre industry of Assam.

In 2017, Barua received the Life Time Achievement Award 2017 from Prag Cine Awards for his immense contributions towards Assamese film industry.

== In popular culture ==
On 23 May 2025, a biopic titled Bhaimon Da, based on the journey of Munin Barua, was released in theatres across Assam and outside the state. It gained popularity among viewers and achieved a good box office collection.
