= Tumi Aahibaane =

- Directed by: Prerana Barbarooah
- Written by: Prerana Barbarooah and Bibi Devi Barbarooah
- Screenplay by: Prerana Barbarooah
- Produced by: Bibi Devi Barbarooah and ASFFDC
- Starring: Ravi Sarma; Barsha Rani Bishaya; Gunjan Bhardwaj; Moonmi Phukan; Nipon Goswami; Pratibha Chowdhury; Saurabh Hazarika; Bibhuti Hazarika; Madhusmita Saikia; Arun Nath; Nilutpal Barua
- Cinematography: Pradip Daimary
- Music by: Tarali Sarma
- Production companies: Prerana Creations and ASFFDC
- Release date: 22 September 2017
- Running time: 113 Minutes
- Country: India
- Language: Assamese
- Budget: Total Budget: ₹1.45 crores Bibi Barbarooah ₹1.1 crores and ASFFDC ₹35 lakhs
- Box office: est. ₹2 crore

Tumi Aahibaane is a 2017 Indian Assamese language musical romance film directed by Prerana Barbarooah and jointly produced by Bibi Devi Barbarooah & ASFFDC under the banner of Prerana Creations. The film stars Ravi Sarma and Barsha Rani Bishaya in lead role and Gunjan Bhardwaj and Moonmi Phukan in Supporting role.

== Cast ==
- Ravi Sarma as Nibir
- Barsha Rani Bishaya as Birina
- Gunjan Bhardwaj as Wasim
- Moonmi Phukan as Shayesha
- Nipon Goswami as Nana, Haren kaiti and Dodaideu
- Pratibha Chowdhury
- Saurabh Hazarika as Anjan
- Bibhutibhusan Hazarika as Jeet
- Madhusmita Saikia as Shabana
- Arun Nath as Karim
- Nilutpal Barua as Sultan
- Tarulata Kutum
- Madhurima Chowdhury
- Priyanka Boruah
- Zubeen Garg
- Manas Robin (guest appearance)

== Soundtrack ==
Tumi Aahibane

Soundtrack album by Tarali Sarma
- Released: 21 May 2017
- Recorded: 2016–2017
- Genre: Feature film soundtrack
- Language: Assamese
- Label: Box Music Asom
- Producer: Bibi Devi Borbarooah

Tarali Sarma chronology
Othelo (2017)	Tumi Aahibane (2017)

The music of the film was released in The Grand Music Launch held aboard AlFresco Grand Cruse on the Brahmaputra on 21 May 2017. The songs composed by Tarali Sarma are now available on all leading music apps across 250+ countries. The songs lending their voices are Zubeen Garg, Tarali Sarma and new debut singer Akhu.

=== Track listing ===
No.	Title	Artist (s)	Length
1.	"Hridoyor Kareng"	Zubeen Garg, Tarali Sarma	04:55
2.	"Tumi Aahibaane"	Tarali Sarma	05:01
3.	"Wasim Wasim"	Akhu	04:23
4.	"O Bhanumoti"	Nilakshi Neog, Sushmita Changmai, Tarali Sarma	02:04
5.	"Aei Nixha"	Tarali Sarma, Mrinal Baishnab	05:36
6.	"Mur Goshai"	Tarali Sarma	01:21
7.	"Xosakoiye"	Tarali Sarma	01:24
8.	"Hridoyor Kareng" (Female version)	Tarali Sarma	04:54
