= Prag Cine Awards North-East 2015 =

- Date: 21 March 2015– 22 March 2015
- Site: Chowkidingee field, Dibrugarh, India
- Hosted by: Nishita Goswami; Nabish Alam
- Organized by: Prag AM Television Pvt. Ltd.

Highlights
- Best Film: North Bank
- Best Direction: Bani Das; Ahetuk
- Best Actor: Arup Baishya; Othello
- Best Actress: Amrita Gogoi; Ahetuk
- Most awards: Ahetuk (9)
- Most nominations: Ahetuk (15)

Television coverage
- Channel: Prag News

The Prag Cine Awards North-East 2015 ceremony, presented by the Prag Network, honored the actors, technical achievements, and films censored in 2014 from Assam and rest of Northeast India, and took place on 21–22 March 2015, at the Chowkidingee field in Dibrugarh, Assam. This was the first time when films produced in other Northeastern states were also honored in this ceremony. Assamese actress Nishita Goswami and television host Nabish Alam hosted the show. Film fraternities from Northeast as well as Bollywood personalities such as Neha Dhupia, Gulshan Grover, Adil Hussain were present in this event.

Actor Bishnu Kharghoria was honored with the lifetime Achievement Award for his contribution towards the Assamese film Industry. Arup Baishya received best actor award for Othello and the best actress award has gone to Amrita Gogoi for Ahetuk. Manas Saikia directed North Bank won the best film award, while Anmol Chan, Nepali language film from Sikkim, won the best film north-east award.

== Winners and nominees ==
In this edition of Prag Cine Awards, awards were given in 22 categories to the Assamese and non-Assamese films produced from Assam and in another 4 categories to the films produced from rest of northeast India and censored in the year of 2014. Ahetuk topped the nomination list with fifteen nominations, followed by North Bank and Othello with twelve and eleven nominations respectively.

=== Awards for films from Assam ===
Winners are listed first and highlighted in boldface.

Best Film	Best Popular Film
**North Bank**; Ahetuk; Othello; TRP Aru...	**Ahetuk**; Rodor Sithi; Suma Poroxote; TRP Aru...
Best Director	Best Debut Director
**Bani Das – Ahetuk**; Diganta Majumdar – Borhxaranya; Hemanta Das – Othello; Manas Saikia – North Bank	**Hemanta Kumar Das – Othello**; Manas Saikia – North Bank; Muketag Ali – Aparajita; Rakesh Sharma – Anuradha
Best Actor Male	Best Actor Female
**Arup Baishya – Othello**; Jatin Bora – Jilmil Jonak; Mridul Baruah – North Bank; Tapan Das – Borhxaranya	**Amrita Gogoi – Ahetuk**; Darshana Bora – Xondhikhyon; Meghranjani Medhi – Anuradha; Pakeeza Begam – North Bank
Best Supporting Actor Male	Best Supporting Actor Female
**Arun Nath – Othello**; Angaraag Mahanta – Rodor Sithi; Bidyut Chakravarty – TRP Aru...; Debojit Majumdar – Borhxaranya	**Mayuri Borkakoti – North Bank**; Aparna Dutta Choudhury – Khyobh; Chandana Sarma – Aarohi; Reena Bora – Xondhikhyon
Best Music Direction	Best Lyrics
**Poran Borkatoky – Ahetuk**; Geet Priyam – Anuradha; Milton – North Bank; Zubeen Garg – Rodor Sithi	**Ibson Lal Baruah – Ahetuk – Title Track**; Diganta Bharati – Rodor Sithi – Protidine; Ibson Lal Baruah – Ahetuk – Meghar Jolonga; Palash Gogoi – TRP Aru... – Xosha Misha
Best Playback Singer Male	Best Playback Singer Female
**Zubeen Garg – Ahetuk – Title Track**; Angaraag Mahanta – Rodor Sithi – Protidine; Rupam Bhuyan – Khyobh; Simanta Sekhar – The Face	**Pompi Gogoi – Ahetuk – Meghar Jolonga**; Mahalakshmi Iyer – Grahan; Tarali Sarma – Khyobh; Zublee Baruah – Boroshi
Best Cinematography	Best Film Editing
**Raktim Mondal – TRP Aru...**; Nahid Ahmed – Ahetuk; Nahid Ahmed – Othello; Suraj Deka – Anuradha	**Amitabh Singha and Dhanjit Das – TRP Aru...**; Raju Gogoi – Othello; Rupam Kalita – North Bank; Sanjeeb Borthakur – Ahetuk
Best Screenplay	Best Choreography
**Ranjit Sarma – Othello**; Bani Das – Ahetuk; Jiten Sarma – Borhxaranya; Manas Saikia and Haren Saikia – North Bank	**Pankaj Ingti – Ahetuk**; Ashim Baishya – Boroshi; Mituparna – Grahan; Uday Shankar – The Face
Best Sound (Re-recording/Mixing)	Best Art Direction
**Amrit Pritam – Rodor Sithi**; Bijoy and Dipak – TRP Aru...; Deepak Dutta – Othello; Jatin Sharma – North Bank	**Noni Borpujari – Rodor Sithi**; Gulok Saha – Borhxaranya; Haripresanna Saikia – North Bank; Manimala Das and Suraj Saikia – TRP Aru...
Best Makeup	Best Costume
**Prasanta Bora – Aarohi**; Babi Chakravarty – Othello; Bapan Kalita – Jilmil Jonak; Panku Hazarika – Ahetuk	**Nandana Baruah – Ahetuk**; Lukumoni Gogoi – Othello; Meenashree Hazarika – Anuradha; Palashi Saikia and Nibha Bhuyan Saikia – North Bank

=== Awards for films from rest of northeast India ===
Winners are listed first and highlighted in boldface.

Best Film North-East	Best Director North-East
**Anmol Chan** (Sikkim, Nepali); Be Smeh (Arunachal Pradesh); Nishani	**Darji Khand Thanggun – Be Smeh (Arunachal Pradesh)**
Best Actor North-East Male	Best Actor North-East Female
**Shalom Kabo – Anmol Chan (Sikkim, Nepali)**	**Sneha Rai – Anmol Chan (Sikkim, Nepali)**

== Lifetime achievement award ==
Actor Bishnu Kharghoria was honored with the lifetime Achievement Award for his contribution towards the Assamese film Industry.

== Other awards ==
- Best Writing on Cinema: Subrat Jyoti Neog
- Jury's Special Mention: Shabnam Borgoyari – Aarohi

== See also ==
- List of Assamese films of the 2010s
