= Sarvagunakar Srimanta Sankardeva =

- Directed by: Manju Borah
- Screenplay by: Manju Borah
- Based on: Philosophy of Srimanta Sankardeva
- Produced by: Sanjive Narain
- Starring: Ranjan Bezbaruah; Rajiv Bhattacharjya; Upakul Bordoloi; Moni Bordoloi; Lakshi Borthakur; Tarali Sarma; Arpana Dutta Choudhury
- Edited by: A. Sreekar Prasad
- Music by: Tarali Sarma
- Production company: AM Television
- Distributed by: AM Television
- Release date: 11 November 2016
- Running time: 140 minutes
- Country: India
- Language: Assamese

Sarvagunakar Srimanta Sankardeva is an Indian Assamese language 2D Computer animation biographical film directed by Manju Borah, Director of Animation and all animation work was single-handedly done by Dr. Gautam k. Das at "24 illusion factory", animation studio, Guwahati, and produced by Sanjive Narain under the banner of AM Television. This is a story about the life of Assam's Great saint Srimanta Sankardeva. This is the first Assamese-language animated film.

== Cast ==
- Ranjan Bezbaruah as Srimanta Sankardeva
- Rajiv Bhattacharjya as Madhabdev
- Upakul Bordoloi
- Moni Bordoloi
- Lakshi Borthakur
- Tarali Sarma
- Arpana Dutta Choudhury
- Pratibha Choudhury
- Ujjal Khanikar
- Amitav Rajkhowa
- Satyen Sarma
- Bibhuti Hazarika
