= Prag Cine Awards =

Awards in Assamese films

- Awarded for: Best in cinemas of Assam and North-East India
- Country: India
- Presented by: Prag News
- First award: 2003

Prag Cine Awards are presented annually by Prag News & Rengoni, a satellite television channel from Assam. The aim of the award to give support, recognition and inspiration to the Assamese film industry and honour some of the eminent film personalities who have contributed to the cause of Assamese cinema of Assam. The award was first instituted in the year 2003. Starting from 2015, films produced in other Northeastern states were also honored in this ceremony.

== Ceremonies ==
Ceremony	Date	Venue	Host(s)	Life Time Achievement
Prag Cine Awards 2004	28 February 2004	Nehru Stadium, Guwahati		Bhupen Hazarika
Prag Cine Awards 2005	5 March 2005	Nehru Stadium, Guwahati		Jnanada Kakati
Prag Cine Awards 2012	12 April 2012	GMCH Auditorium, Guwahati		Nipon Goswami
Prag Cine Awards 2013	14 April 2013	GMCH Auditorium, Guwahati	Pranjal Saikia, Zerifa Wahid	Biju Phukan
Prag Cine Awards 2014	22 March 2014	Koramangala Indoor Stadium, Bangalore	Kopil Bora, Zerifa Wahid	Mridula Barua
Prag Cine Awards North-East 2015	21–22 March 2015	Chowkidingee Field, Dibrugarh	Nishita Goswami, Nabish Alam	Bishnu Kharghoria
Prag Cine Awards North-East 2016	14–15 May 2016	Church Field, Tezpur	Barsha Rani Bishaya, Kopil Bora, Nishita Goswami	Bidya Rao
Prag Cine Awards North-East 2017	17–18 June 2017	Bodofa Cultural Complex, Kokrajhar		Munin Barua
Prag Cine Awards North-East 2018	26–27 May 2018	Gauhati Medical College and Hospital (GMCH) Auditorium, Guwahati		Kualada Kumar Bhattacharya
Prag Cine Awards 2019	1–2 June 2019	Neheruwali, Nagaon		
Prag Cine Awards 2020	Cancelled due to COVID-19 Pandemic			
Prag Cine Awards 2021	30 January 2021	USTM Auditorium, Meghalaya		Aribam Syam Sharma
Prag Cine Awards 2022	26 March 2022		Satindra Mohan Dev Stadium, Silchar	Ravi Sharma, Siddharth Sharma, Deepjyoti Keot, Dimpu Baruah
Prag Cine Awards 2023	27 May 2023	USTM Auditorium, Meghalaya		Taufiq Rahman, Chetana Das
Prag Cine Awards 2024	16 February 2024	Jorhat Stadium		Dinesh Das
Prag Cine Awards 2025	9 March 2025	Sarusajai Stadium		
Prag Cine Awards 2026	5 July 2026	Jyoti Bishnu Auditorium		

== Awards ==
=== Awards for films from Assam ===
- Best Film
- Best Popular Film
- Best Director
- Best Debut Director
- Best Actor Male
- Best Actor Female
- Best Supporting Actor Male
- Best Supporting Actor Female
- Best Music Direction
- Best Lyrics
- Best Playback Singer Male
- Best Playback Singer Female
- Best Cinematography
- Best Film Editing
- Best Screenplay
- Best Choreography
- Best Sound (Re-recording/Mixing)
- Best Art Direction
- Best Makeup
- Best Costume
- Best Film other than Assamese
- Best Villain

=== Awards for films from rest of northeast India ===
- Best Film North-East
- Best Director North-East
- Best Actor North-East Male
- Best Actor North-East Female

== See also ==
- Assamese cinema
- National Film Award for Best Feature Film in Assamese
