= Calendar (2018 film) =

- Directed by: Himjyoti Talukdar
- Screenplay by: Himjyoti Talukdar; Santanu Rowmuria; Jhulan Krishna Mahanta
- Story by: Himjyoti Talukdar
- Produced by: Himjyoti Talukdar; Dikhit Das
- Starring: Moloya Goswami; Arun Nath; Gunjan Bhardwaj; Rimjhim Deka
- Cinematography: Dikhit Das
- Edited by: Jhulan Krishna Mahanta
- Music by: Tarali Sarma
- Production company: Enajori Talkies
- Release date: 16 February 2018
- Running time: 90 minutes
- Country: India
- Language: Assamese

Calendar is a 2018 Indian Assamese-language drama film directed by Himjyoti Talukdar under the banner of Enajori Talkies. The film stars Moloya Goswami, Arun Nath, Gunjan Bhardwaj and Rimjhim Deka. The movie was released on 16 February 2018 in theatres across Assam. The film has received good word of mouth publicity and the footfall has been increasing since its release. Many people have expressed in social media how this film made them emotional about their relationship with the family especially old parents. The film received the maximum number of seven awards in Prag Cine Awards North East 2018 in various categories. Lead actor Arun Nath won the Jury Special Award in the 2nd Guwahati International Film Festival for his performance in the film.

== Cast ==
- Moloya Goswami as Manorama Kakati
- Arun Nath as Hitesh Kakati
- Gunjan Bhardwaj as Arunabh
- Rimjhim Deka as Fatema

== Synopsis ==
Hitesh Kakati is a retired teacher who lives with his wife Manorama Kakati happily in a small town. Their son, newly married Arunav, stays in Delhi with his non-Assamese wife. Both the son and daughter-in-law are dear to Hitesh and Manorama Kakati, and they too love their parents. But, the situation gradually changes when Arunav comes home during Magh Bihu and tells Manorama, a major problem which he is facing in his professional life. Manorama becomes tensed after knowing Arunav's crisis and plans to help him in her own way. On the other hand, Manorama records her monthly activities in a calendar gifted by Kakati on New Year. She marks every event in that particular calendar with a circle mentioning the event name. But she marks a few dates with circles without mentioning anything, which then leads to the exploring of a different tale, devastating Hitesh Kakati.

== Production and development ==
The film was shot in beautiful locations in Dergaon, Golaghat and Jakhalabandha of Assam. The film teaser was launched on 27 February 2017. The film received CBFC Certificate on 13 December 2017, and released on 16 February 2018.

== Music ==
=== Score ===
Background score of the film is composed by Tarali Sarma who also provided music for three tracks on the film's soundtrack album.

=== Soundtrack ===
The soundtrack is composed by Tarali Sarma and features playback singer Siddharth Hazarika.

=== Lyrics ===
Two songs of the film is penned down by Tarali Sarma and one song is written by Santanu Rowmuria.

=== Track listing ===
No.	Title	Lyrics	Music	Singer	Length
1.	"Hothate Dekhu Jibone"	Tarali Sarma	Tarali Sarma	Siddharth Hazarika	4:38
2.	"Xoru Xoru"	Tarali Sarma	Tarali Sarma	Siddharth Hazarika	3:46
3.	"Jibone Umole Jamole"	Santanu Rowmuria	Tarali Sarma	Siddharth Hazarika	4:42
Total length:					12:26

Not included track
No.	Title	Lyrics	Music	Singer	Length
4.	"Xoru Xoru"	Tarali Sarma	Tarali Sarma	Tarali Sarma	3:46
Total length:					16:12

== Awards ==
At Prag Cine Awards 2018

- Best Actor (Male) : Arun Nath
- Best Debut Director : Himjyoti Talukdar
- Best Supporting Actor (Female) : Rimjhim Deka
- Best Screenplay : Himjyoti Talukdar, Santanu Rowmuria, Jhulan Krishna Mahanta
- Best Lyrics : Tarali Sarma
- Best Singer (Male) : Siddharth Hazarika
- Best Art Direction : Kalpana Borah

At 2nd Guwahati International Film Festival 2018

- Jury Special Award : Arun Nath

== Official selection at festivals ==
- 9th Jagran Film Festival 2018
- Habitat Film Festival 2018
- Pondicherry International Film Festival 2018
- 2nd Guwahati International Film Festival 2018
