= Sandhyaraag =

Sandyaraag Cry of Twilight
- Directed by: Bhabendra Nath Saikia
- Written by: Bhabendra Nath Saikia
- Screenplay by: Bhabendra Nath Saikia
- Based on: Short story "Banprastha"
- Produced by: Bhabendra Nath Saikia
- Starring: Runu Devi; Arun Saikia
- Cinematography: Indukalpa Hazarika
- Edited by: Nikunja Bhatyacharya
- Music by: Ramen Choudhury; Indreswar Sarma; Prabhat Sarma
- Release date: 5 August 1977
- Running time: 145 minutes
- Country: India
- Language: Assamese

Sandyaraag is a black and white Assamese language film, directed and produced by Bhabendra Nath Saikia. It was released in theatre in 1977. The film was based on a story titled 'Banprastha'. The screenplay and dialogues were written by the director himself. Sandhyaraag was awarded with silver medal for best Assamese film in the 25th National Film Awards. It is the first Assamese film to be showcased in the Indian Panorama.

== Cast ==
- Runu Devi
- Arun Sarma
- Arati Baruah as Mrs. Das
- Raju Bordoloi
- Mamoni Das
- Triptikalpa Hazarika
- Maya Baruah
- Kashmiri Saikia
- Purnima Pathak
- Nanu Dutta
- Ishan Baruah
- Ananda Mohan Bhagavati
- Sangita Saikia
- Upkul Bordoloi
