= Manabendra =

Manabendra may refer to

- Manabendra Adhikary, Assamese film producer
- Manabendra Mukhopadhyay, Indian singer and music composer
- Manabendra Shah, Indian politician
- Manabendra Narayan Larma, Bangladeshi politician
- Manabendra Nath Roy, Indian revolutionary
- Manabendra Sharma Girls' College, Women's college at Rangia, in Kamrup district, Assam
