= Gunjan Bhardwaj =

Indian actor

- Born: 17 July 1988 (age 37); Tinsukia, Assam, India
- Occupation: Actor
- Years active: 2014–present
- Known for: Ahetuk; Ruff And Tuff; Calendar
- Height: 6 ft (183 cm)
- Relatives: Rimpi Das (sister)

Gunjan Bhardwaj (Assamese: গুঞ্জন ভৰদ্বাজ) is an Indian film and television actor from the state of Assam. His notable Assamese films are Tumi Aahibaane, Priyar Priyo, Eraxutir Dhol and Calendar. He made his acting debut in the 2014 Assamese film TRP aru.... Gunjan Bhardwaj played the lead role in popular Assamese feature film Ahetuk.

== Career ==
Gunjan Bhardwaj started his career acting in music videos. After the producers saw his potential, he got a break in the film world. In 2014 his first film TRP Aru was released in the theatres. Ahetuk was his second film directed by Bani Das where Amrita Gogoi is cast opposite him.

Gunjan has acted in four big budget Assamese films of 2017, Prerana Barbarooah's Tumi Aahibaane, Himjyoti Talukdar's Calendar, Mani Sinha's Ruff and Tuff and Munin Barua's Priyar Priyo.

== Filmography ==
| Year | Films | Director | Notes |
|---|---|---|---|
| 2014 | TRP Aru ... | Mridul Gupta | Debut film |
| 2015 | Ahetuk | Bani Das | |
| 2017 | Tumi Aahibane | Prerana Barbarooah | |
| 2017 | Ruf And Tuf | Mani Sinha | |
| 2017 | Priyar Priyo | Munin Barua | |
| 2018 | Calendar | Himjyoti Talukdar | |
| 2018 | Tumi Muk Faki Dila | Hadif Ahmed | |
| 2019 | Kokaideu Bindaas | Dhruva Bordoloi | |
| 2019 | Eraxutir Dhol | Charu Kamal Hazarika | |
| 2020 | Janaknandini | Kunjalata Gogoi Das | |
| 2023 | Mamatar Sithi | Nirmal Das | |
| 2023 | Rongatapu 1982 | Adityam Saikia | |
