= Jhulan Krishna Mahanta =

Indian film editor, director, and screenwriter

Jhulan Krishna Mahanta is an Indian film editor, director, and screenwriter from Assam, India. He graduated from the Dr. Bhupen Hazarika Regional Government Film and Television Institute in Guwahati and began his career as a film editor before transitioning into directing.

== Career ==
Mahanta started his professional career as a film editor. He has worked as an editor on Assamese films such as Calendar (2018), starring Moloya Goswami, and Kooki (2024), a Hindi-language drama film directed by Pranab J. Deka.

One of his directorial works includes The Silent Darkness, a short film depicting a young, orphaned girl growing up amid the separatist movement in Assam.

Another significant film is Sundarpur Chaos, which delves into social and political issues affecting contemporary Assam. The film explores themes of identity crisis and cultural heritage. Set in the fictional village of Sundarpur, the film follows protagonist Kingkor as he navigates the challenges of illegal immigration and the encroachment of Sattra land, reflecting broader regional concerns. Mahanta’s thoughtful direction highlights the inner conflicts of Assam’s youth, blending tradition with modernity. Released on 25 October 2024, across theaters in Assam, the film has been praised for its nuanced portrayal of the state’s complex identity struggles.
