= Priyaar Priyo =

Indian Assamese language film

- Directed by: Munin Barua
- Produced by: Abdul Mannan Faruk
- Starring: Zubeen Garg; Aradhana Buragohain; Gunjan Bhardwaj
- Cinematography: Pradip Daimary
- Edited by: Samujjal Kashyap
- Music by: Zubeen Garg
- Release date: 10 November 2017 (Assam)
- Running time: 173 minutes
- Country: India
- Language: Assamese

Priyaar Priyo is a 2017 Indian Assamese-language romantic comedy film directed by Munin Barua and produced under Azaan Films. It marked the final film of Munin Barua as a director in his lifetime, before he died on 7 April 2018. It is the 9th highest grossing Assamese film.

== Cast ==
- Zubeen Garg as Bishnujyoti Bezbaruah
- Aradhana Buragohain as Priya Baruah
- Pranjal Saikia as Brikodar Phukan
- Gunjan Bhardwaj as Priyonath Nath
- Sunita Kaushik as Hiya
- Bikram Rajkhowa as Priyo Ranjan Talukdar
- Nikumoni Baruah as Priya's mother
- Saurabh Hazarika as Bhaskar Borah
- Pabitra Baruah as Sripati
- Siddhartha Sharma as M.L.A. Priyo Ranjan's bodyguard
- Manjula Barua (guest appearance)
- Tridip Lahon
- Sasanka Samir
- Achinta Shankar as Dipu
- Barsha Rani Bishaya and Aimee Baruah (Special appearance in the song "Priyar Priyo')

== Soundtrack ==
Priyar Priyo

Soundtrack album by Zubeen Garg
- Released: 18 October 2017
- Recorded: 2017
- Genre: Feature film soundtrack
- Length: 20:50
- Producer: Zubeen Garg

Zubeen Garg chronology
Mission China (2017)	Priyar Priyo (2017)	The Underworld (2018)

Track List
No.	Title	Lyrics	Artist(s)	Length
1.	"O Priya"	Zubeen Garg	Zubeen Garg, Bornali Kalita, Ritrisha Sarma	5:10
2.	"Akuli Bikuli"	Zubeen Garg	Zubeen Garg, Nahid Afreen	7:04
3.	"Priyar Priyo"	Diganta Bharati	Zubeen Garg, Neel Akash, Kumar Bhabesh	4:46
4.	"Priyaro Priyaro Bosono"	Sasanka Samir	Zubeen Garg, Mayurpankhi	3:48
Total length:				20:50

== Awards ==
Date	Award	Category	Recipients	Result	Ref.
27 May 2018	Prag Cine Awards	Best Popular Actor (Male)	Zubeen Garg	Won	
27 May 2018	Prag Cine Awards	Best Actress-Popular	Aradhana Buragohain	Nominated	
27 May 2018	Prag Cine Awards	Best Supporting Actor in Male	Pranjal Saikia	Won	
27 May 2018	Prag Cine Awards	Jury's Special Award	Munin Barua	Won	
