= Beharbari Outpost =

- Genre: Sitcom
- Written by: Pallab Paban Bora
- Directed by: Manoj Saikia
- Starring: Siddharth Sharma; Deepjyoti Keot; Rintu Bora; Pritam Baruah; Richa Chetry; Kristina Baruah; Hiranya Deka; Seema Baruah; Ashwini Deka; Kamal Thakuria
- Opening theme: Beharbari Outpost
- Composer: Nilutpol Bora
- Country of origin: India
- Original language: Assamese
- No. of episodes: 3428

Production
- Production locations: Guwahati, Assam, India
- Editors: Utpal Kalita, Gauranga Madhab Saikia
- Running time: 20 minutes
- Production company: AM Television

Original release
- Network: Rengoni
- Release: 7 October 2013 – present

Beharbari Outpost is an Assamese Indian comedy television series which airs on Rengoni. The series revolves around Beharbari police station. The series first aired on 7 October 2013. It is the longest running series on the channel and in Assam.

== Synopsis ==
Police officers try to solve unique and sometimes outrageous cases while trying to espouse important values and morals.

Beharbari outpost is led by SI Pritam and ASI Bishnu Nath features Constable KK, CID Mohan, Beauty Bailung, Moni Bou, Mukuta Da, Sushmita, Rakesh and many more characters. Each episode ends with a message to the public.

== Cast ==
- Siddhartha Sharma as Krishna Kamal Khatoniyar, husband of Moni, Mukuta Deka's brother-in-law. At first he appeared as a home guard in Assam Police, then he appeared as the Havildar of Beharbari Outpost, but after a break of almost a year he is currently acting as ASI at Beharbari Outpost.
- Pritam Baruah as IC Pritam Khargharia
- Deepjyoti Keot as CID Mohan. An absent-minded innocent character, he first appeared as a thief but now acts as a tea seller.
- Rintu Bora as Rakesh Hazarika, a computer operator
- Mritdyutpol Mahanta as IC Xopun
- Anuska Kashyap as SI L.M.
- Bishnu Nath as ASI Harbhajan Singh
- Seema Boruah as Lady Constable Toramai Nagoyani
- Kamal Thakuria as Kamal Thakuria, a homeguard
- Aswini Deka as Mukuta Deka, elder brother of Moni, Krishna Kamal Khatoniyar's brother-in-law
- Anshuman Bhuyan as Purusuttam Garg (Daag Sir)
- Richa Chetry as Lady Constable Richa Chetry (Riksha Baidew)
- Hirak Kaushik Boruah as LC Lutukon Baruah (Popoukon Sir)
- Hiranya Deka as New Havildar Kripabor Kakoti (Tipabor Sir)
- Kristina Barua as Lady Constable Angel Kumkum

=== Former Cast ===
- Late Failou Basumatary as Constable Failou Basumatary (Modahi Sir)
- Sumki Kachari as Basumoti Beauty Bailung, a Lady Constable with an obese but active body
- Papori Borah as Moni Bou, Krishna Kamal Khatoniyar's Wife, Mukuta Deka's younger sister
- Barsha Rani Bishaya as DSP Bijuli Baruah
- Nishita Goswami as DSP Lataghaboru, Deputy Superintendent of police
- Angushmita Gogoi as Neha
- Parvin Sultna as Sushmita Sen
- Surya Krishna as Horo
