= Manju Borah =

Assamese film director and writer

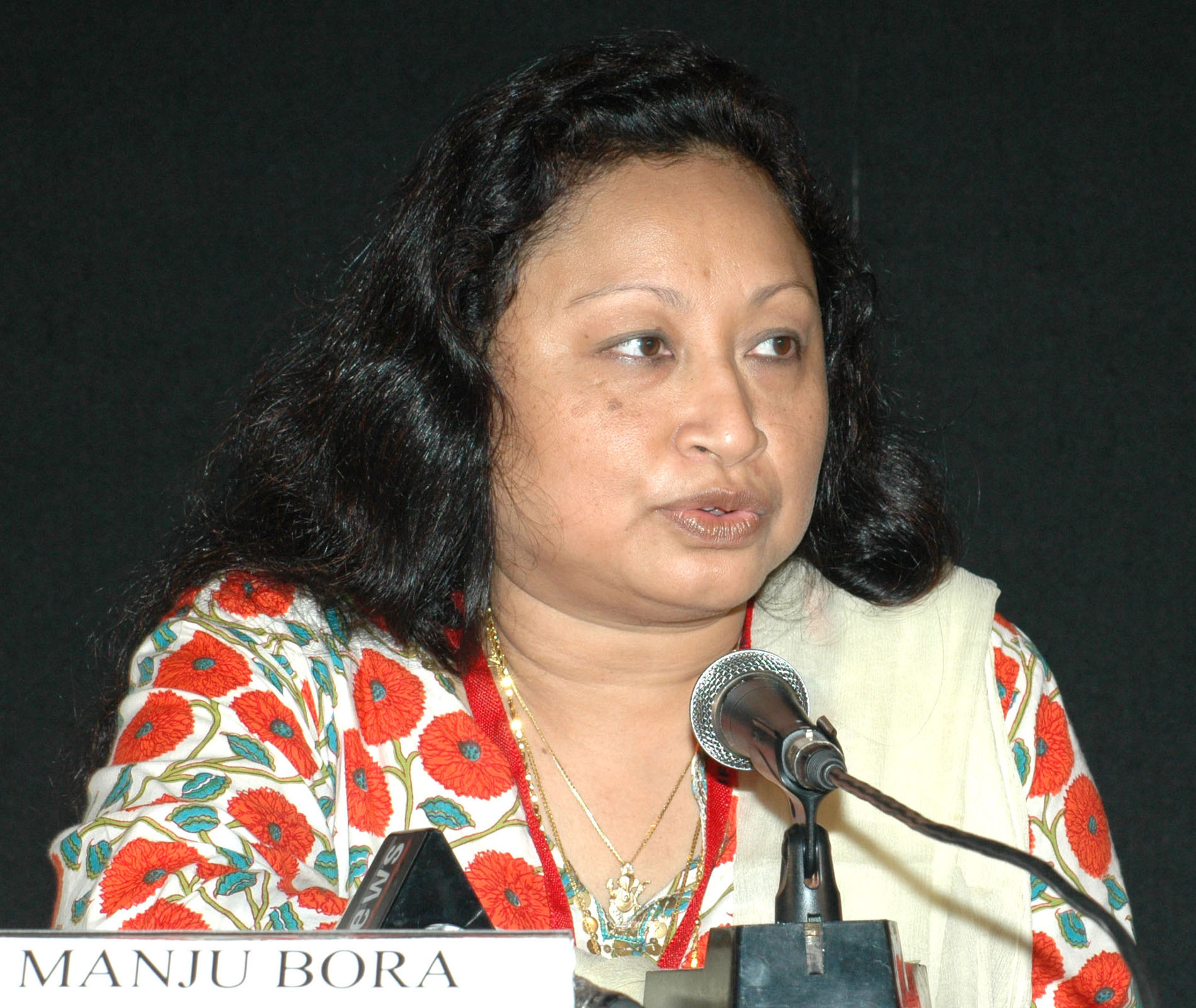
- Manju Borah in 2006
- Born: Assam, India
- Occupations: Film director, Screenwriter
- Website: manjuborah.com

Manju Borah is an Indian film director and short story writer from Guwahati, Assam. Borah also served as Jury Member, Indian Panorama, IFFI 2007, 10th MAMI International Film Festival 2008 and 3rd Eye 7th Asian Film Festival Mumbai 2008, 55th National Film Awards for 2007 (Feature Films) Delhi 2009.

== Filmography ==
Year	Title	English Title	Language
1999	Baibhab	A Scam in Verse	Assamese
2001	Anya Ek Yatra		Assamese
2003	Akashitorar Kothare	A Tale Told Thousand Times	Assamese
2004	Laaz	Shame	Assamese
2006	Joymati	The Saviour	Assamese
2008	Aai Kot Nai	Ma	Assamese
2012	Ko:Yad	A Silent Way	Mising
2015	Dau Huduni Methai	Song of the Horned Owl	Bodo
2016	Sarvagunakar Srimanta Sankardeva		Assamese
2019	Bishkanyar Deshot	In the Land of Poison Women	Pangchenpa

== Awards ==
National Film Awards

Year	Film	Category	Citation	Ref
1999	Baibhab	Special Mention	For her poetic expression in her debut film.	
2003	Aakashitorar Kothare	Best Feature Film in Assamese	For its juxtaposition of a woman's search for her cultural heritage and its loss.	
2003	Aakashitorar Kothare	Best Female Playback Singer	Awarded to Tarali Sarma; For her tuneful rendition of a devotional song without instrumental accompaniment.	
2008	Aai Kot Nai	Best Feature Film on National Integration	For its honest look at a burning problem in Northeast India, its attempt to break down artificial boundaries and giving it a human and aesthetic appeal.	
2012	Ko:Yad	Best Feature Film in Mishing	A stark and realistic film with a strong subtext about a driftwood collector makes compelling viewing.	
2012	Ko:Yad	Best Cinematography	Awarded to Sudheer Palsane; The unexplored charm of North-East India through different seasons is all the more alluring in the eyes of this Cinematographer.	
2018	In the Land of Poison Women	Best Feature Film in Pangchenpa	The film is a depiction of an individual’s effort to break the myth of ‘poison women’ in a remote part of Arunachal Pradesh.	

Other awards

Year	Award	Film	Ref
2000	Gollapudi Srinivas Award	Baibhab	
2000	Best film in Asia, 6th Dhaka International Film Festival	Baibhab	
2004	Best Director, Assam State Film Award	Aakashitorar Kothare	
2004	Audience Award, Dhaka International Film Festival	Aakashitorar Kothare	
