= Basundhara =

Basundhara may refer to:

- Basundhara (2009 film), an Indian Assamese-language film
- Bosundhora, 1977 Bangladeshi film
- Bashundhara (disambiguation), a Bangladeshi conglomerate

== See also ==
- Vasundhara Enclave, neighborhood of East Delhi, Delhi, India
- Vasundhara (film), a 2014 Indian film
- Vasundhara (TV series), an Indian TV show
- Vasundhara Raje, former chief minister of Rajasthan, India
