= Bashundhara =

Bashundhara can refer to:

- Bashundhara Group, one of the largest industrial conglomerates of Bangladesh
  - Bashundhara Ad-din Medical College, a joint venture medical college between Bashundhara Group and Ad-din Foundation
  - Bashundhara City, shopping mall in Dhaka, the second largest shopping mall in Bangladesh
  - Bashundhara Residential Area, private residential area of Badda Thana in Dhaka District in the Division of Dhaka, Bangladesh
  - Bashundhara Kings, football club which is playing in Bangladesh Football Premier League
    - Bashundhara Kings Arena, home stadium of Bashundhara Kings
    - Bashundhara Kings Ultras, supporters club of Bashundhara Kings
    - Bashundhara Kings Women, a women's football team
  - Bashundhara Bangladesh Open, golf tournament on the Asian Tour
  - Islamic Research Center Bangladesh, known as Bashundhara Islamic Research Center
- Basundhara, 2010 India Assamese-language drama film

== See also ==
- Basundhara (disambiguation)
