= List of Assamese-language television channels =

This is a list of Assamese language television channels in India.

== Government owned channels ==
Channel	Launch	Video	Audio	Owner
DD North-East	1994 (as DDK Guwahati)	SD	Stereo | 2.0	Doordarshan, Prasar Bharati
DD Assam	2020 (as DDK Assam)	SD	Stereo | 2.0	Doordarshan, Prasar Bharati

== General entertainment ==
Channel	Launch	Video	Audio	Owner
Rang Tv	2009	SD	Stereo | 2.0	Pride East Entertainment
Rengoni	2013	SD	Stereo | 2.0	AM Television
Spondon TV	2022	SD	Stereo | 2.0	NKTV Media Pvt Ltd

== Movies ==
Channel	Launch	Video	Audio	Owner
Indradhanu	2017	SD	Stereo | 2.0	Pride East Entertainment

== Music ==
Channel	Launch	Video	Audio	Owner
Ramdhenu	2011	SD	Stereo | 2.0	Pride East Entertainment

== News ==
Channel	Launch	Video	Audio	Owner
Prag News	2001	SD	Stereo | 2.0	AM Television
DY365	2008	SD	Stereo | 2.0	Brahmaputra Tele Production Limited
News Live	2008	SD	Stereo | 2.0	Pride East Entertainments Pvt. Ltd.
Assam Talks	2015	SD	Stereo | 2.0	Rockland Media and Communication Pvt Ltd
Pratidin Time	2015	SD	Stereo | 2.0	Yash TV Entertainment Pvt Ltd (Pratidin Group)
News18 Assam North East	2016	SD	Stereo | 2.0	Network18 Group
NE News (Northeastern Language including Assamese)	2019	SD	Stereo | 2.0	ITV Network JV with AM Television (Prag News)
NKTV Plus	2021	SD	Stereo | 2.0	NK Power and Infrastructure Pvt Ltd
Pratham Khabar 24x7	2021	SD	Stereo | 2.0	UBP Media & Entertainment Pvt Ltd
Asom Live 24	2023	Asom Live 24 Digital Media		

== Defunct channels ==
Channel	Launch	Video	Defunct	Owner
Focus Hi-Fi	2000	SD	2015	Positive Television Pvt Ltd
Focus NE	2003	SD	2015	Positive Television Pvt Ltd
Jonack	2014	SD	2026	
Frontier TV	2005	SD	2019	Frontier TV
ETV Bal Bharat (Assamese feed)	2021	SD	2022	ETV Network
Glow North East		SD		

== See also ==
- List of English-language television channels in India
- List of HD channels in India
- List of Hindi television channels
