= Ranjit Sarma =

- Born: 21 February 1950 (age 76); Assam, India
- Occupation: Screenplay Writer

Ranjit Sarma (born 21 February 1950, at Guwahati), has worked in the field of film, stage and radio play, film criticism since 1980. Third son of freedom fighter Late Pabindra Nath Sarma and Late Kunjabala Devi.

== Work ==
Two of his books are printed and published namely, Ranjit Sarma’r Nirbasito Sankalan (1998) & Sanglap (1995). He wrote the screenplay of the films named Sankalpa (1986), 31st June (1992), Mimangsa (1994), Raag Biraag (1996), Nisiddha Nodi (1999), Baibhab (1999), Oniyo Ek Yatra (2002), Othello (2014).

== Achievements ==
- Assam Sahitya Sabha Award for Best Drama in 1985 for 'Sanglap'
- Best Dramatist Award for 'Prarthana' in around one act play competitions
- Best Screenplay Award for 'Baibhab' (1999) at State Film Award Festival, Assam (2005)
- Best Screenplay Award for 'Othello' at Indian Cine Film Festival, Mumbai (2014)
- Best Screenplay Award for 'Othello' at Prag Cine Awards North-East 2015, Assam
- Radio play 'Mayar Udvid' (Enchanted Flora) was broadcast through stations of A.I.R. in Akhil Bharatiya Karjyakram (1998)
