= Akashitorar Kothare =

- আকাশীতৰাৰ কথাৰে
- Directed by: Manju Bora
- Produced by: Sangeeta Tamuli
- Starring: Bishnu Kharghoria; Pranjal Saikia; Rituparna Phukan
- Cinematography: Raju Mishra
- Music by: Tarali Sarma
- Release date: November 14, 2003
- Country: India
- Language: Assamese

Akashitorar Kothare is an Assamese-language film directed by Manju Bora that won two National Film Awards at the 51st National Film Awards. It stars Bishnu Kharghoria, Pranjal Saikia and Rituparna Phukan in lead roles.

== Plot ==
The film depicts the life of Akashitora, an educated girl who specialised in folklore and started research into the woman-oriented cultural trails of Assam with the help of her Tawoi(father's best friend). As she gets married, she finds herself as a conventional housewife. Her oppressive husband physically and mentally abuses her and a devastated Akashitora is left with no choice. Loosing self-respect, Akashitora realises that her married life is going away from herself.

== Cast ==
- Bishnu Kharghoria
- Pranjal Saikia
- Rituparna Phukan
- Anup Hazarika
- Ankur Bishaya
- Dilip Bora

== Production ==
The film was produced by Sangeeta Tamuly under the banner of Chitra Communications.

== Reception ==
Rong Sarmah reviewed the film for The Telegraph and wrote "The music by Tarali Sarma bears significance from the ritualistic and traditional viewpoint, though the required subtlety in mixing is missing."

Pranjal Borah wrote "Traditions reveal to her that the young girls were forced to become Devadasis to entertain the rich and the powerful."

== Awards ==
Year	Award	Category	Result	Ref.
2004	51st National Film Awards	Best Assamese Feature Film	Won	
2004	51st National Film Awards	Best Female Playback Singer	Won	
