= Poley Poley Urey Mon =

- Directed by: Timothy Das Hanche
- Written by: Timothy Das Hanche
- Produced by: Phukan Konwar; Purnananda Gogoi; Beauty Baruah
- Starring: Nipon Goswami; Barsha Rani Bishaya; Gayatri Mahanta; Ravi Sarma; Rimpi Das; Parineeta Borthakur; Mahika Sharma
- Cinematography: Sibanan Baruah
- Edited by: Debankur Borgohain; Niranjan Gogoi
- Music by: Biman Baruah; Arup Dutta; Timothy Das Hanche
- Distributed by: Hills Motion Pictures Association
- Release date: 20 May 2011
- Country: India
- Language: Assamese

Poley Poley Urey Mon is a 2011 Indian Assamese language drama film directed by Timothy Das Hanche, produced by Phukan Konwar, Purnananda Gogoi and Beauty Baruah under the banner Hills Motion Pictures Association of Diphu. The casts of the movie are Nipon Goswami, Moloya Goswami, Barsha Rani Bishaya, Gayatri Mahanta, Ravi Sarma, Rimpi Das, Parineeta Borthakur, Tarun Arora, Mahika Sharma etc. Bollywood actor Raza Murad and former Assam CM Tarun Gogoi also performed a cameo in this movie.

== Cast ==
- Sourabh Hazarika as Partha Hazarika
- Gayatri Mahanta as Sangita (Partha's Wife)
- Barsha Rani Bishaya as Lalita
- Parineeta Borthakur as Pallavi (Partha's Sister)
- Ravi Sarma as Proloy (Partha's Brother)
- Rimpi Das as Kasturika (Sangita's Sister)
- Nipon Goswami as Radhika Mohan Goswami (Satriya Dance Teacher)
- Moloya Goswami as Partha, Proloy and Pallavi's Mother
- Asthajita Bordoloi as Guest Appearance in Manuhe Manuhor Babe Song
- Tarun Arora as Amit
- Raza Murad as Amit's Father
- Pushpa Verma as Amit's Mother
- Mahika Sharma
- Arup Bora as Raja
- Arun Hazarika
- Hiranya Deka as Paniram

== Soundtrack ==
Poley Poley Urey Mon

Soundtrack album by Timothy Das Hanche, Biman Baruah and Arup Dutta
- Released: January 2011
- Recorded: 2011
- Language: Assamese
- Label: Hills Motion Pictures Association
- Producers: Phukan Konwar; Purnananda Gogoi; Beauty Baruah

The music of Poley Poley Urey Mon was composed by Timothy Das Hanche, Biman Baruah and Arup Dutta. Dr. Bhupen Hazarika's famous Manuhe manuhor babe was also sung by Asthajita Bordoloi.

Track listing
No.	Title	Artist(s)	Length
1.	"Poita Bhaat"	Zubeen Garg
2.	"Proti Poley"	Zubeen Garg, Subasana Dutta
3.	"Kio Baru Udash"	Shaan
4.	"Jiban Morut"	Parineeta Borthakur
5.	"Etia Nahiba"	Shaan
6.	"Aajir Ei Mitha"	Alka Yagnik
7.	"Sopunot Koba"	Shaan, Alka Yagnik
8.	"Manuhe Manuhor babe"	Asthajita Bordoloi
9.	"Bor Bor Manuhor"	Adnan Sami
10.	"Poita Bhat (Hindi Version)"	Zubeen Garg, Mahalaxmi Iyer
11.	"Dil Dole"	Zubeen Garg, Shreya Ghoshal
12.	"Aap Ub Kyon Rahe Hai"	Shaan

== See also ==
- Assamese cinema
