= Kooki (film) =

2024 Hindi-language film

- Directed by: Pranab J Deka
- Story by: Dr Junmoni Devi Khaund
- Produced by: Dr Junmoni Devi Khaund
- Starring: Ritisha Khaund; Rajesh Tailang; Dipannita Sharma; Devoleena Bhattacharjee; Ritu Shivpuri
- Cinematography: Gyan Gautam
- Edited by: Jhulan Krishna Mahanta
- Music by: Pallab Talukdar; Sourav Mahanta; Tapan Jyoti Dutta
- Production company: Niri Media Opc Private Limited
- Distributed by: Jai Viratra Entertainment Limited
- Release date: 28 June 2024
- Running time: 115 minutes
- Country: India
- Language: Hindi

Kooki is a 2024 Indian Hindi-language drama film produced by Niri Media Opc Private Limited and starring Ritisha Khaund, Rajesh Tailang, Dipannita Sharma, Devoleena Bhattacharjee and Ritu Shivpuri.

The film premiered at the Cannes Film Festival in May 2024. The film also premiered at the BVFF in 2023.

== Premise ==
Kooki is a 16-year-old girl whose life and promising future are shattered by a tragic incident. The court's verdict fails to provide her with the justice she seeks, leaving her feeling betrayed and abandoned as a victim.

== Cast ==
- Ritisha Khaund as Kooki
- Rajesh Tailang as Dhanajay Mishra
- Rina Rani as Suman Mishra
- Dipannita Sharma as S.P. Mandira Singh
- Bodhisattva Sharma as Saptrishi
- Devoleena Bhattacharjee as Navnita
- Ritu Shivpuri as Dr.Priyadarshini Pator

== Release ==
The film was premiered at Cannes on 21 May 2024. The film was released in cinemas on 28 June 2024.

== Reception ==
Mahpara Kabir, of ABP News, rated 3/5 stars and wrote, "Kooki is a strong film with a striking dialogue asking why rape isn't considered the most heinous crime". Ashna Santosh, of Times Now, stated, "Kooki emerges as a poignant cinematic portrayal that transcends mere storytelling to provoke profound introspection."
