= Rimpi Das =

Indian actress and model

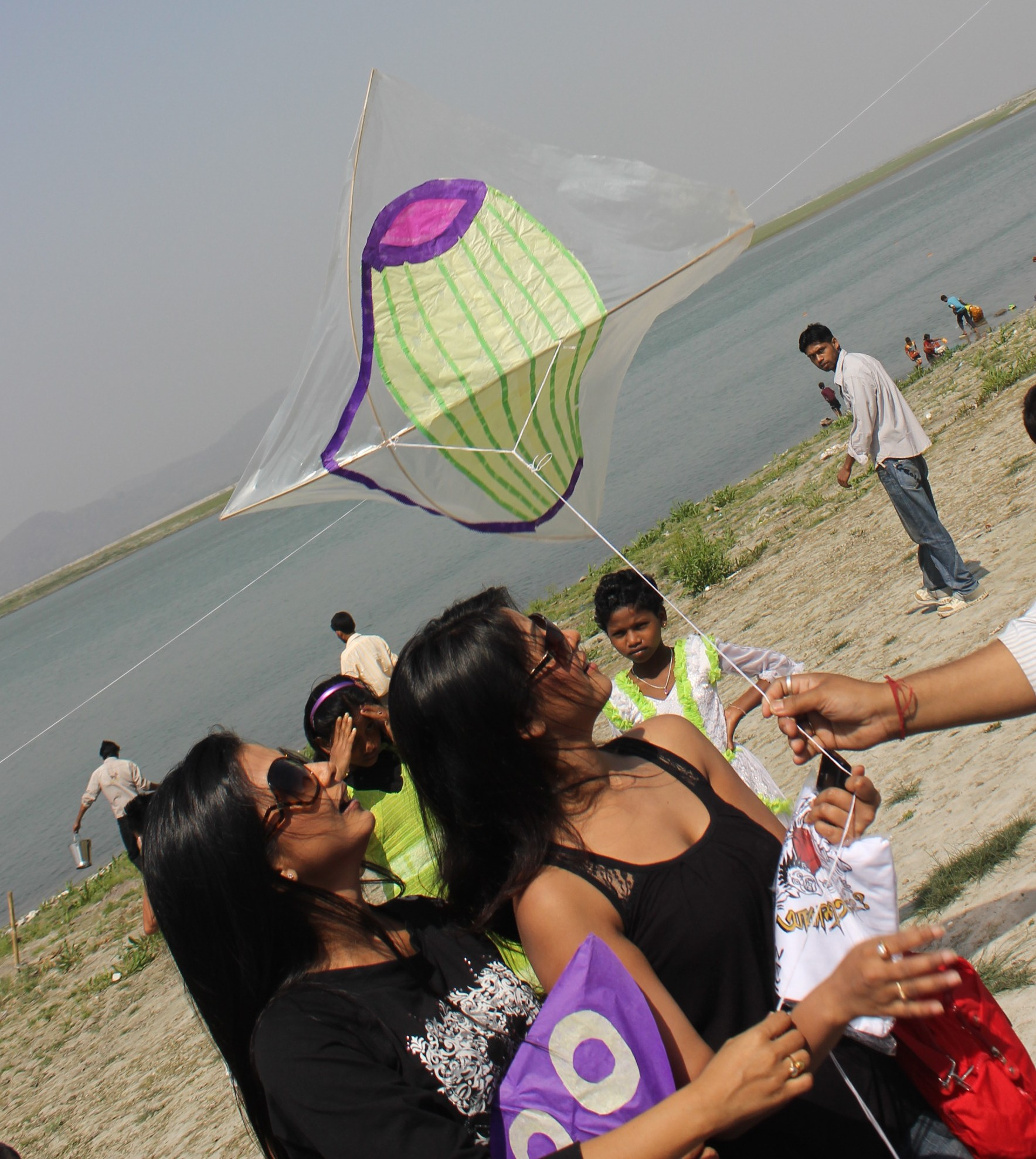
- Rimpi Das (Right) at Jeevan kite festival on 26 February 2012
- Born: Tinsukia, Assam, India
- Occupations: Actress, Model
- Years active: 2004–present
- Height: 5.7
- Spouse: Binoy Talukdar (m. 2023)
- Relatives: Gunjan Bhardwaj (brother)

Rimpi Das is an Indian actress and model, who appears in Assamese cinema and Hindi television serials. She has appeared in many Assamese movies which includes national award-winning films like Ajeyo and Mon Jaai. She has also done Assamese VCD films like Uroniya Mon, Phaguni, Jonaki Mon etc. She made her Kollywood debut through Paali directed by A.Jesudoss.

== Career ==
Rimpi Das made her acting debut in the 2004 Assamese film Monot Birinar Jui directed by Ashok Kumar Bishaya. In 2010, Rimpi Das entered into the mobile theatre industry of Assam through Kohinoor Theatre. She started her Hindi television career in BIG Magic's popular Hindi serial Akbar Birbal, where she played the role of Anarkali along with well known Hindi television actors like Kiku Sharda, Vishal Kotian and Delnaaz Irani.

She has also portrayed the supporting role of Parvati in Indian epic series Siya Ke Ram along with Rohit Bakshi in Star Plus and in another Indian epic television series of Colors, Mahakali– Anth hi Aarambh hai where she played the character of Devi Ganga.

== Personal life ==
Rimpi is the eldest of three siblings. Her younger brother Gunjan Bhardwaj is also a popular actor of Assamese film and television industry.

== Filmography ==
=== Film ===
Key	†	Denotes films that have not yet been released

Year	Film	Role	Notes
2004	Monot Birinar Jui		Debut film
2006	Joon Tora		
2006	Adhinayak		
2006	Aami Asomiya		
2007	Paali	Paali	Tamil film
2007	Uroniya Mon		VCD Film
2008	Jonaki Mon		VCD Film
2008	Mon Jaai		
2010	Ochin Chinaki		
2011	Poley Poley Ure Mon		
2013	Karma Ke Rati		Assamese-Sadri film
2014	Ajeyo		
2016	Gaane Ki Aane		
2023	Dr. Bezbaruah 2		Special appearance in the song "Phool Phool"
2023	Rongatapu 1982		
2025	Homework†		
TBA	Avataran†		

=== Television ===
Year	Serial	Role	Broadcast Channel
2015	Runjun		Rang (TV channel)
2015	Akbar Birbal	Anarkali	BIG Magic
2015	Hazir Jawab Birbal	Noor	Big Magic
2015	Siya Ke Ram	Parvati	Star Plus
2017	Mahakali– Anth hi Aarambh hai	Ganga	Colors
2018	Savdhaan India	Mishti	Star Bharat

=== Music Video ===
Year	Song(s)	Album(s)	Singer(s)	Language	Music Composer	Lyrics	Co-actor(s)	Note/Ref(s)
2005	"Dhekide Dhekide"	Nayana	Zubeen Garg	Assamese	Mrinalkanti	Krishnamoni Nath		Her First Assamese Music Video
2006	"Sweet Love"	Mukha	Zubeen Garg	Assamese	Zubeen Garg	Zubeen Garg	Zubeen Garg	
2006	"Dusakure Nilare"	Mukha	Zubeen Garg, Arunima Bhattacharya	Assamese	Zubeen Garg	Zubeen Garg	Zubeen Garg	
