= Paali (film) =

- Title card
- Directed by: A. Jesudoss
- Written by: Rajugopi (dialogue)
- Screenplay by: A. Jesudoss
- Story by: Vijaya Baarati Arts
- Produced by: Vijaya Baarati Arts
- Starring: Sre; Rimpi Das
- Cinematography: Sajeth Menon
- Edited by: J. N. Harsha
- Music by: Bhagwat
- Release date: 25 May 2007
- Country: India
- Language: Tamil

Paali (or Bali; /pɑːlaɪ/) is a 2007 Indian Tamil-language romantic drama film directed by A. Jesudoss and starring Sre and Rimpi Das with Azhagu and Pagala in supporting roles. The film was released on 25 May 2007 to mixed-to-negative reviews.

== Plot ==
London Music College student Richard travels to a remote village to learn more about an instrument named Paali. Incidentally, the village chief's daughter goes by the same name. Richard and Paali eventually fall in love much to Kaarai (Richard's proposed bride)'s despise. Kaarai becomes a suspect when Richard disappears and is allegedly killed. How Richard is found and how he unites with Paali forms the rest of the story.

== Cast ==
- Sre as Richard
- Rimpi Das as Paali
- Azhagu as Paali's father
- Pagala as Kaarai
- Rani as Paali's mother

== Production ==
Sre made his debut and Assamese actress Rimpi Das made her Tamil debut through this film. The film was produced by Sre's home production, Vijaya Baarati Arts. The film was shot in Chennai, the Nilgiris, Pondicherry, and Spain.

== Soundtrack ==
The music was composed by Bhagwat. The lyrics were written by Piraisoodan, Snehan, Viveka, Yugabharathi, Tolkappiyan, and Muthuvijayan.

Track listing
No.	Title	Singer(s)	Length
1.	"Sellakutti"	Anuradha Sriram	3:56
2.	"Unnai Paathadum"	Karthik, Mahathi	4:11
3.	"Thottale"	Sundara Rajan, chorus	4:17
4.	"Theye Theye"	Saindhavi, chorus	5:11
5.	"Route Route"	Tippu	4:32
6.	"Margazhiyil"	Kalyani Menon	3:53
Total length:			26:00

== Release and reception ==
Malini Mannath of Chennai Online wrote that "Paali would have turned out better if the director was more focused on his central theme and not got distracted by irrelevant situations and forced in dance numbers". A critic from Cine South wrote that "Bali is for the patient people!"
