= Manas Robin =

Indian music director and singer

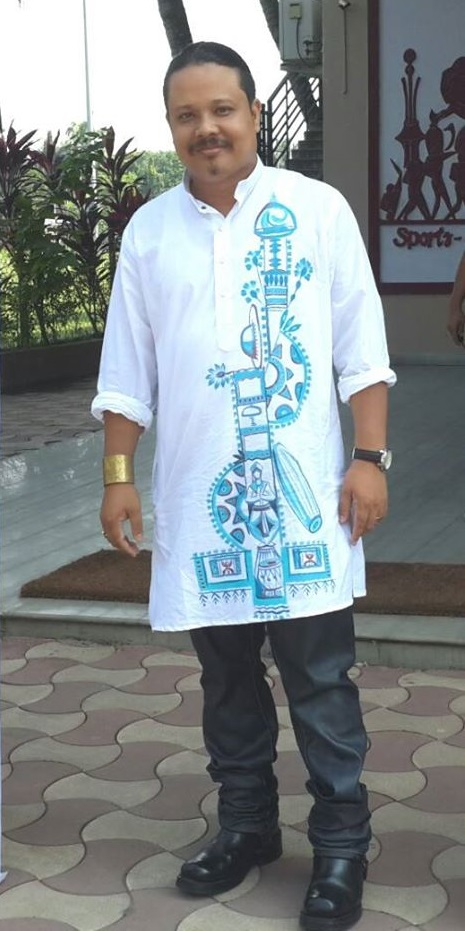
- Born: Manas Jyoti Gogoi; 3 December 1976 (age 49); Sivasagar, Assam, India
- Education: Jagannath Barooah College
- Occupations: Singer; lyricist; composer; music director; music producer; filmmaker
- Years active: 1996–present
- Spouse: Sumita Baruah
- Children: Deresa Robin, Shivayush Robin
- Relatives: Pabitra Margherita (Cousin nephew)
- Website: manasrobin.com

Manas Jyoti Gogoi (born 3 December 1976), better known as Manas Robin, is an Indian music director, singer, lyricist, filmmaker, Bihu artist, and music producer from Assam.

== Early life ==
Manas Robin was born to Mr. Rabindra Nath Gogoi and Mrs. Tilabala Dihingia on 3 December 1976. He did his early schooling at 233 No. Nimaijan Prathamik Vidyalaya (primary school). He did his matriculation from Sivasagar Government Higher Secondary School. After that, he went to Jagannath Barooah College, Jorhat for further education.

== Career ==
In 1995, his first solo album Niharika under the banner of Music Makers was released. It was followed by Ujan Piriti in 1997 under Typhoon Production, Manas Kanya and Barasha under Saraswati Communications in 1999. He has been the youngest director to score music for an Assamese film in 1999 when he composed music for Priya O’ Priya. He has, since then done music direction for over 20 Assamese feature films.

He has directed music for over 500 music albums in Assamese and other languages of the northeast. He has also produced and directed several VCD films in Assamese, including Jonbai, and directed audio albums for singer Dr. Bhupen Hazarika, Zubeen Garg, and many others.

== Discography ==
=== As a singer ===
Year	Album(s)	Co-singer(s)
1995	Niharika	—N/a
1997	Ujan Piriti	Zubeen Garg, Bhitali Das
1999	Borosha 99	Zubeen Garg, Tarali Sarma
1999	Manaskanya	Tarali Sarma
2000	Birina	Various
2000	Borosha 2000	Zubeen Garg, Mili Baruah, Tarali Sarma
2001	Ronga Policeor Bihu	Zubeen Garg
2001	Xunaru 2001	Zubeen Garg, Bhitali Das
2002	Anjana 2002	Zubeen Garg, Bhitali Das
2002	Nahor 2	Zubeen Garg, Tarali Sarma
2003	Brahma	Zubeen Garg
2004	Vishnu	Zubeen Garg, Rameshwar Pathak
2012	Putola	—N/a
2026	Robin Army	—N/a

=== As a music director ===
Year	Film	Director
1999	Priya O Priya	Anjan Kalita
2002	Eyei Jonak Biheen Jivan	Munna Ahmed
2002	Kokadeutar Ghar Jowai	Suman Haripriya
2003	Ujonir Dujoni Gabhoru	Chandra Mudoi
2003	Barala Sangsar	Achyut Bhagawati
2003	Rongmon	Amal Baruah
2004	Kadambari	Bani Das
2005	Junbai	Rajesh Bhuyan
2006	Junbai 2	Rajesh Bhuyan
2006	Champa	Manas Robin
2007	Junbai 3	Rajesh Bhuyan
2007	Champa 2	Manas Robin
2007	Hero	Manas Robin
2008	Junbai 4	Rajesh Bhuyan
2008	Hero 2	Manas Robin
2008	Pokhila	Rajesh Bhuyan
2009	Junbai 5	Rajesh Bhuyan
2009	Lifafa	M Maniram
2010	Lifafa 2	M Maniram
2011	Jilmil Jonak	Sibanan Boruah
2012	Aparajita	Moon Mustaq
2019	Kokaideu Bindaas	Dhruva Jyoti Bordoloi

=== As a composer ===
Year	Album(s)	Singer(s)
2000	Nahor	Zubeen Garg, Bhitali Das, Gitimoni, Santa Uzir
2001	Hiyamon	Zubeen Garg, Babita Sharma
2002	Anjana 2002	Zubeen Garg, Mitali Chaudhary, Tarali Sarma, Bhitali Das
2002	Akou Hiyamon	Zubeen Garg, Babita Sharma
2003	Keteki	Zubeen Garg, Bhitali Das, Tarali Sarma
2003	Nahor 3	Zubeen Garg
2003	Sinaki Mon	Zubeen Garg
2003	Brahma	Zubeen Garg, Manas Robin
2004	Zubeen Manasor Bihu	Zubeen Garg, Manas Robin
2004	Mon Birina	Zubeen Garg, Bornali Kalita, Nirmali Das, Pranab
2004	Anjana 2004	Zubeen Garg, Bhitali Das, Bornali Kalita, Nirmali Das
2004	Nahor 4	Zubeen Garg
2004	Lajuki Mon	Zubeen Garg, Subasana Dutta
2004	Vishnu	Zubeen Garg, Rameshwar Pathak
2005	Zubeen Manasor Gaan	Zubeen Garg, Manas Robin
2005	Zubeen Manasor Bihu 2	Zubeen Garg, Manas Robin
2005	Hikoli	Zubeen Garg
2012	Putola	Manas Robin
2026	Robin Army	Manas Robin

=== As a lyricist ===
Year	Song(s)	Album(s)	Singer(s)
2001	"O Nobou Oi"	Hiyamon	Zubeen Garg
2002	"Aage Pase"	Akou Hiyamon	Zubeen Garg
2002	"Nidiya Nidiya"	Shishu	Zubeen Garg
2003	"Bhal Pau Ne"	Sinaki Mon	Zubeen Garg
2004	"Sip Sip Borokhun"	Lajuki Mon	Zubeen Garg
2004	"Patoliya Morome"	Lajuki Mon	Zubeen Garg, Subasana Dutta
2004	"Gaa Bhora Boyokhor"	Lajuki Mon	Zubeen Garg
2004	"Ejaru Nuphule"	Lajuki Mon	Zubeen Garg
2004	"Kali Rati"	Lajuki Mon	Zubeen Garg
2004	"Nongola Mukhote"	Lajuki Mon	Zubeen Garg
2004	"Majulir Ejoni"	Jantra	Zubeen Garg

== Achievements ==
Year	Nominated work	Category	Award	Result	Note
1999		Youngest music director		Won	Youngest music director of feature film award
2002		Best Lyricist	Prag Cine Award	Won	
2003, 2004, 2005		Best Music Director Award		Won	film music
2006, 2007	Jonbai	Best video filmmaker	Chitralekha Award	Won	
2011	Romoni Gabaru Botah	Socio-Cultural activities	Public award	Won	
2019	Pangrao Phukan Botah	Socio-Cultural activities	Public award	Won	
