= Kokaideu Bindaas =

2019 Assamese romantic drama film

- Directed by: Dhruva Jyoti Bordoloi
- Written by: Chinmoy Sarmah
- Produced by: Ramesh Pandey Chetry
- Cinematography: Papu Deka
- Edited by: Ratan Sil Sarma
- Music by: Manas Robin
- Release date: 1 March 2019
- Running time: 120 mins
- Country: India
- Language: Assamese

Kokaideu Bindaas is a 2019 romantic drama film released in the Assamese language.

== Cast ==
- Gunjan Bhardwaj
- Nikumoni Boru
- Zabir Saeed
- Alismita Goswami
- Janu Nath
- Mintu Borua
- Jayanta Das
- Monuj Borkotoky
- Pori Mahanta
- Doly Thakuriya
- Dharmaram Deka
- Gupamoni Gogoi

== Music ==
Kokaideu Bindaas

Soundtrack album by Manas Robin
- Released: 4 January 2019
- Recorded: 2018
- Genre: Feature film soundtrack

Manas Robin chronology
Aparajita (2012)	Kokaideu Bindaas (2019)

The music of Kokaideu Bindass was composed by Manas Robin.

Track listing
No.	Title	Singer(s)	Length
1.	"Moina Bakhor"	Zubeen Garg
2.	"Gun Gun"	Neel Akash
3.	"Abelire"	Rupam Bhuyan, Subasana Dutta
