= In the Land of Poison Women =

- Film poster
- Directed by: Manju Borah
- Produced by: Manju Borah
- Cinematography: Sudheer Palsane
- Edited by: A Sreekar Prasad
- Music by: Aniruddha Borah
- Release date: November 2019 (IFFI)
- Running time: 104 minutes
- Country: India
- Languages: Pangchenpa, Hindi, English

In the Land of Poison Women, also known as Bishkanyar Deshot, is a 2019 Pangchenpa language feature film from India by Manju Borah. The story is based on distinguished litterateur Yeshe Dorjee Thongchi’s much acclaimed work. The language Pangchenpa is used by Monpa tribe with a population of just around 5000, settled near the India-China border region, some hundred kilometres West of Tawang in Arunachal Pradesh, India.

== Plot ==
Sangra and Lusang's two children and four others die after consuming a local wine that was prepared by Lusang. She is ostracised by her community over their superstitious belief of her being a doumoh – a poison woman.

== Filming ==
The film was shot at picturesque locations of lower and upper Himalaya, in Arunachal Pradesh, India. The 30 people crew and equipment came from Bombay and Guwahati and took four days to reach the shoot location crossing Sela Pass which is the world's second highest motorable road.

The director was not familiar with the language, she had to learn the language, and also used a language assistant to direct and edit the film.

== Awards ==
Year	Film Festival	Category	Result	
2019	International Film Festival of India	Indian Panorama		
2019	National Films Award	Best Feature Film in Pangchenpa	Won	The film is a depiction of an individual's effort to break the myth of ‘poison women’ in a remote part of Arunachal Pradesh.

== Cast ==
- Dondup Drema
- Kendan Tashi
- Lobsang Drema
- kesang wangda
- oggy tatsumi
- Ayano kiyoshi
