= Beharbari =

- Neighbourhood
- Location in Guwahati Location in Assam
- Coordinates: 26.113204°N 91.773069°E
- Country: India
- State: Assam
- District: Kamrup Metropolitan district
- City: Guwahati

Government
  - Body: GMC
- Time zone: UTC+5:30 (IST)
- PIN: 781 XXX
- Vehicle registration: AS-01
- Lok Sabha constituency: Gauhati
- Vidhan Sabha constituency: Gauhati East
- Planning agency: GMC
- Civic agency: GMC

Beharbari is a locality in southern part of Guwahati in India. It neighbours the Lalmati and Lokhra localities. It is near National Highway 27 and is known as a local commercial centre.

The Accountant General Employees' Residential Complex is located in Beharbari. It also houses a service station for Maruti Suzuki operated by Bimal Auto Agency.

== Etymology ==
The etymology of locality is derived from two native Kamrupi dialect (of Assamese language) words. 'Behar' (বেহাৰ) is mustard and 'bari' (বাৰী) is an enclosed ground with a plantation.

== In popular culture ==
Beharbari Outpost, an Assamese comedy television series, revolves around the Beharbari police station.

== See also ==
- Pan Bazaar
- Paltan Bazaar
- Beltola
