= Subrat Jyoti Neog =

Indian film critic, theatre critic and playwright

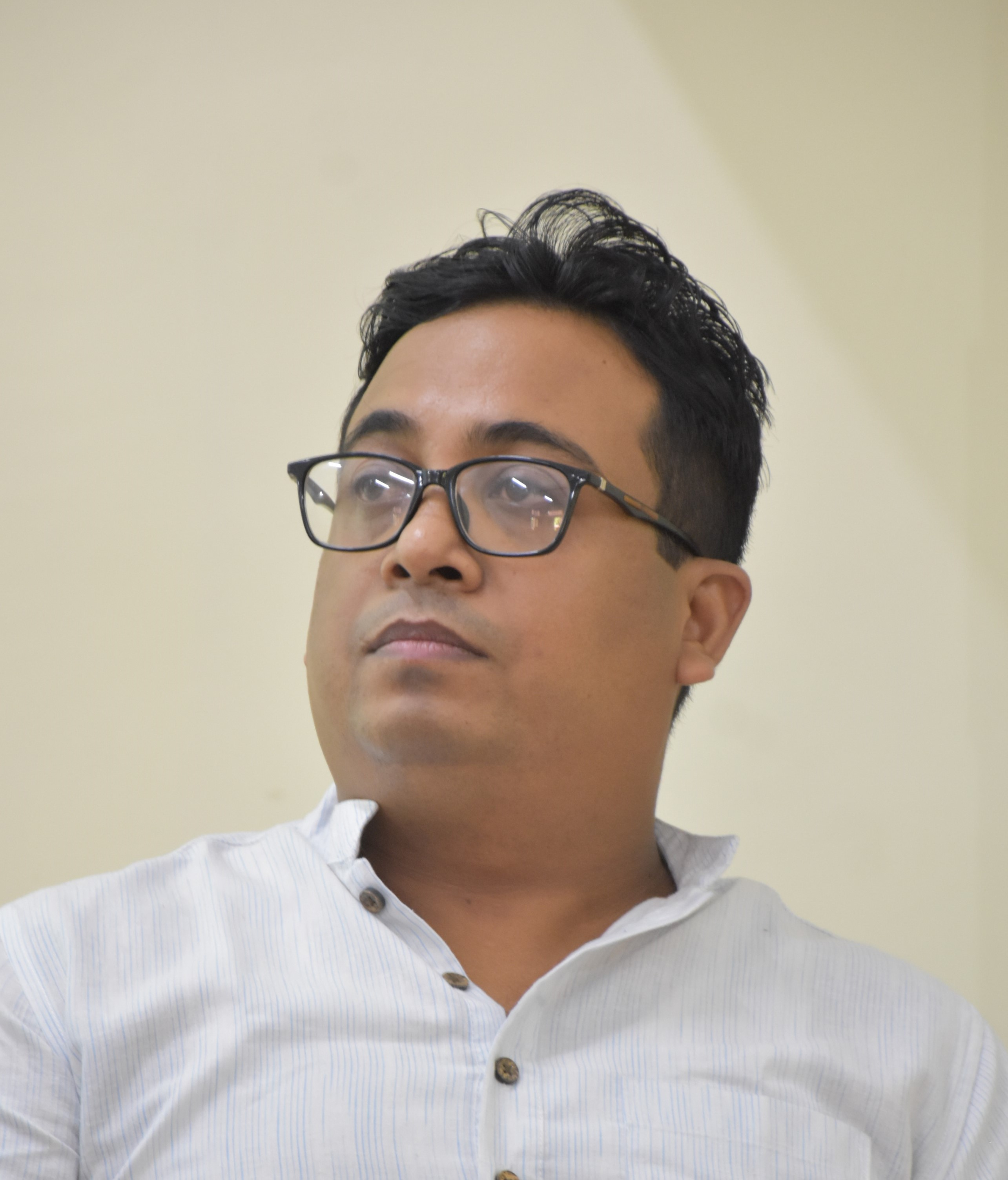
- Neog in 2023
- Born: Subrat Jyoti Neog; 1984 (age 41–42); Jorhat, Assam, India
- Citizenship: Indian
- Education: Gauhati University; Guwahati College
- Occupations: University Teacher, Film Critic, Theatre Critic, Playwright
- Spouse: Rituparna Borah
- Writing career
- Language: Assamese
- Subject: Assamese

Subrat Jyoti Neog (born 1984) is a Film Critic, a Theatre Critic and a Playwright from the Indian state of Assam. He teaches in Tezpur University at the department of Assamese as an associate professor.

== Academic life ==
Neog did his graduation from Guwahati College, and then moved to Gauhati University to pursue his post-graduation in Assamese language and Assamese literature. After that, he did his doctoral research on the topic 'Homen Borgohainir Gadaya Sahityar Bhasa Ek Sailibijnanbhittik Adhyayan' (English: The language of Homen Borgohain's Prose: A Study in the Light of Stylistics) and completed it on 2014 under the guidance of Lilabati Saikia Bora . He served in Hem Chandra Dev Goswami College as an assistant professor from 2010 to 2020 and then joined Tezpur University as an Associate Professor and Head of the Department at Department of Assamese from 2020.

== Published works ==
He has many publications related to film and theatre in the reputed journals, newspapers, magazines to his credit. Which has been compiled in the following books.

- Sahitya Sanskritir Subash (English: Essence of Literature and Culture) (2010)
- Indian Drama: Tradition and Translation (editor) (2012)
- Tapaswinee (English: Saintess) (About Mamoni Raisom Goswami's Life and Literature) (2012)
- Chalachitra Sahitya (English: Film Literature) (2014)
- Sailibijnan Aru Asamiya Sahitya Saili (English: Stylistics and Assamese literature) (2015)
- Sampratik Bharatiya Chalachitra (English: Contemporary Indian Cinema) (2019)

Apart from books, his plays air via All India Radio, Guwahati. Also he has shown interest in screen play writing for Television fiction series and documentary making as well.

== Awards and honors ==
- Assam State Film Award, 2023 for Best writing on Cinema
- Jury Member (Non-feature film jury) of Indian Panorama for 52nd International Film Festival of India
- Best Writing on Cinema, Prag Cine Awards North-East 2015
