= Avataran =

Upcoming Assamese film

- Directed by: Tarunabh Dutta
- Written by: Tarunabh Dutta
- Produced by: Tarunabh Dutta
- Starring: Reema Kaif; Ananya Parashar; Devam Shwel; Govind Malakar; Rimpi Das; Saurabh Hazarika; Pranjal Saikia; Purnima Saikia; Sameer Ranjane
- Cinematography: Tarunabh Dutta
- Edited by: Tarunabh Dutta
- Music by: Nilutpal Choudhury; Dhiraj Dutta
- Production company: TD Film Studio
- Country: India
- Language: Assamese

Avataran is an upcoming Assamese-language science fiction film directed and produced by Tarunabh Dutta under the banner of TD Film Studio Productions. The film features Reema Kaif, Ananya Parashar, Devyam Seal, Govind Malakar, Rimpi Das, Saurabh Hazarika, Pranjal Saikia, Purnima Saikia and Sameer Ranjane. The film was initially scheduled for a release on August 21, 2020, but the release date has been postponed due to the COVID-19 pandemic in India.

This is the first Assamese science fiction film.

== Cast ==
- Pranjal Saikia
- Purnima Saikia
- Rimpi Das
- Saurabh Hazarika
- Ananya Parasha
- Sameer Ranjan
- Govinda Malakar
- Sangeeta Pachani
- Vishal P. Chaliha
- Ronit Raj

== Production ==
Production and principal photography began in 2012. Filming took place in and around Guwahati, Assam.
