= News18 Assam North East =

- Logo used since 2017
- Country: India
- Broadcast area: India and worldwide
- Headquarters: Protech Center, Ganeshguri, Guwahati, Assam, India

Programming
- Languages: Assamese, English
- Picture format: 576i SDTV

Ownership
- Owner: Network18 Group
- Sister channels: Network18 Group channels

History
- Launched: 24 June 2016; 10 years ago

Links
- Website: assam.news18.com

Availability

Streaming media
- Live Streaming: Watch Live

News18 Assam North East is a 24-hour satellite channel of Assam, based in Guwahati, Assam. The channel focuses Assam and other North Eastern states of India, and tagged as News 18 Assam North East. This channel is owned by Network18 Group. It covers regional as well as national and international news and various other shows in Assamese and English. The channel was launched on 24 June 2016.

Previous News18 Assam North East logo from 2016 to 2017

== Broadcast programs ==
- Dintur Xirunam
- Xandhiyar Xirso Xambad
- Ekhontek
- Tirthayatra
- Dintur Bixoi
- Rising Sports Shining Northeast
- Xipa
- Cinema 18
- Gaon Sohor Zilar Khobor
- Bixes 30 Minute
- Druto Xongbaad

== See also ==
- CNN-News18
- List of Assamese-language television channels
