= Pratidin Time =

- Logo used since 2023
- Country: India
- Broadcast area: India
- Headquarters: Pratidin Time Building, RG Baruah Rd, Guwahati, Assam, India

Programming
- Language: Assamese
- Picture format: 576i SDTV

Ownership
- Owner: Pratidin Media Network
- Key people: Nitumoni Saikia (Editor in Chief)

History
- Launched: 1 April 2015; 11 years ago

Links
- Website: pratidintime.com

Pratidin Time is a 24-hour Assamese news channel launched in 2015. The channel offers comprehensive news coverage along with a diverse range of programmes on infotainment, sports, entertainment, lifestyle, showbiz, fashion, and education.

== History ==
Pratidin Time is a 24-hour Assamese satellite news channel of Assam, India. It launched on 1 April 2015. Pratidin Time is a unit of Yash TV Entertainment Pvt. Ltd. The channel is a sister concern a media network of Assam, weekly newspaper Sadin, daily newspaper Asomiya Pratidin and women's magazine Nandini.

== Associated journalists ==
- Nitumoni Saikia, editor-in-chief of this channel.
- Mrinal Talukdar, senior journalist

== Controversies ==
- In August 2015, Pratidin Time was slammed on social media for airing a report on "scantily clad" women, calling them a summer-time nuisance that went against the local culture. After the massive outrage online, Pratidin Time pulled down the video from its official YouTube channel which was uploaded in May 2015. However, a copy of it with English subtitles went viral on social networking sites. There has also been an online petition to Assam's Chief Minister Tarun Gogoi to enforce responsible journalism, supported by many including Adil Hussain, and Rajni Basumatary
- In April 2021, a phone call recording went viral where Minister Pijush Hazarika was heard threatening a journalist of Pratidin Time for airing a news related to his wife Aimee Baruah

== Programs ==
- Prime Time
- Pratidin@5
- Abhimat
- Bishleshan – Let's Debate
- The Big Hour
- Morning Prime
- Geet

== See also ==
- List of Assamese-language television channels
