= Amrita Gogoi =

Indian film and television actress

- Born: 22 December 1991 (age 34); Sivasagar, Assam
- Occupation: Actress
- Years active: 2015–present
- Known for: Ahetuk; Pratighaat

Amrita Gogoi is an Indian film and television actress who works in Assamese film industry. She made her debut Ahetuk was released in 2015.

== Filmography ==
=== Films ===
Key	†	Denotes films that have not yet been released

Year	Film	Role	Director	Notes
2015	Ahetuk	Joyeeta	Bani Das	Debut film and Won the Best Actor Female category in Prag Cine Awards North-East 2015
2017	Konwarpurar Konwar	Maina	Rajesh Bhuyan	
2017	Dur	Puja	Kangkan Rajkhowa	
2017	Soygaonor Champa	Champa	Chandra Mudoi	
2018	Nijanor Gaan	Unknown	Munna Ahmed	
2018	Ipare Hipare	Unknown	Pranabjyoti Bharali	
2019	Pratighat	Unknown	Achinta Sankar	
2022	Rhino Express	Dipika/Pari	Mani Sinha	
2025	Herowa Chanda	Kuhee	Jahnu Barua	

=== Music videos ===
- Pedel Mari Mari- Babu Borah
- Biju Biju Mon - Dikshu Sarma
- Malobika Borua - Dikshu Sarma

== Theatres ==
Amrita Gogoi started her acting career of Mobile Theatre in the season of 2016 - 17 in Hengul Theatre where Prosenjit Bora and Syamontika Sharma in opposite role.

Season	Theatre	Notes
2016 - 17	Hengul Theatre	Debut in Theatres

== Awards and nominations ==
Year	Award	Category	Film	Result
2015	Prag Cine Awards North-East 2015	Best Actor Female	Ahetuk	Won
2017	Prag Cine Awards North-East 2017	Best Actor Female	Dur	Nominated
