= Prabhat Sarma =

Indian flutist (1935–2021)

Prabhat Sarma প্ৰভাত শৰ্মা
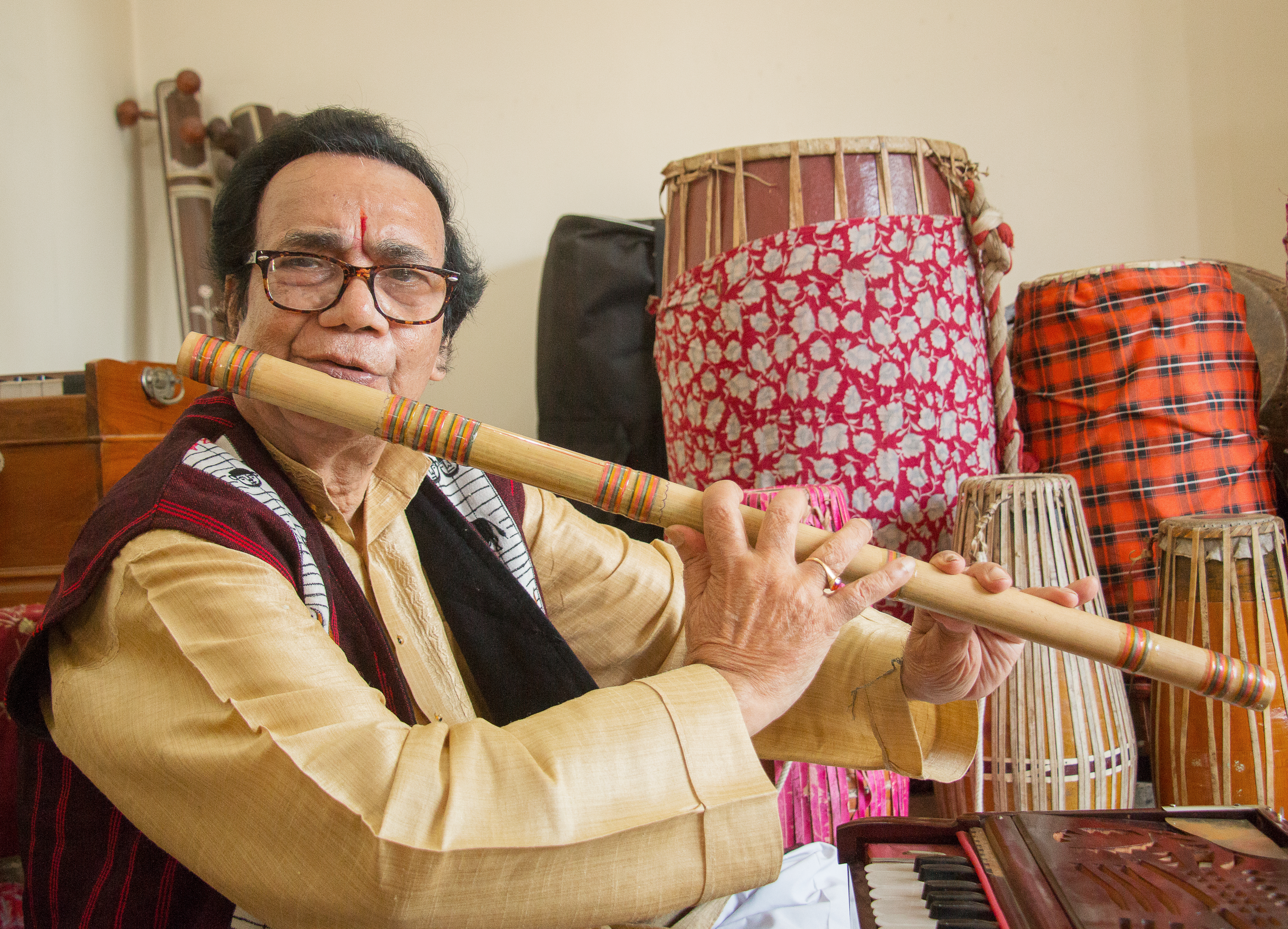
- Sarma playing flute at his residence

Background information
- Born: 7 July 1935; Barpeta, Assam, India
- Died: 2 March 2021 (aged 85) Guwahati, Assam, India
- Genres: Folk
- Occupations: Flutist; Music Director
- Instruments: Flute; Khol; Nagara; Bhortal; Dotara; Tabla

Prabhat Sarma (Assamese: প্ৰভাত শৰ্মা) (7 July 1935 – 2 March 2021) was a folk exponent and flutist from Assam, India.

== Personal life and family ==
Sarma's daughter, Tarali Sarma, is a National Award–winning singer.

== Career ==
Sarma was a staff artist in the Information and Public Relations Department of the Government of Assam from 1960 to the end of 1990. He joined Akashvani Guwahati Centre in 1973 and retired in 1998.

Sarma formed a musical team called Panchjanya Sankhadhanni with various indigenous musical instrumentalists from Assam. Panchjanya Sankhadhanni was later renamed Devgandhar. In addition to working as a music director in Assamese films such as Black Money, Santaan, Sandhyarag, Sarathi, Aaponjan, Mohmukti, Anal, Kadamatale Krishna Naache, and Shrimanta Shankardev, Sarma also composed music for Assamese TV serials such as Patharughate Ringiyai and Brikodar Baruar Biya.

Sarma was regarded as a distinguished performer of Borgeet, which were composed by Srimanta Sankardeva and Madhavdeva in the 15th–16th centuries.

Sarma also explored Sattriya dance, a classical form pioneered in Assam by Srimanta Sankardeva. He had a number of musical instruments, including some that are now obsolete, and built a miniature museum. He later used these rare instruments in orchestral performances. He played various indigenous folk instruments such as the Khol, Nagara, Bhortal, Dotara, and Tabla.

== Awards ==
Sarma received the Sangeet Natak Akademi Award in 2003 for his contribution to the traditional and folk music of Assam. He was honoured with the Asom Shilpi Diwas Award by the Government of Assam in 2001.

== Death ==
Sarma died on 2 March 2021 due to age-related ailments.
