= Manabendra Adhikary =

Indian film producer

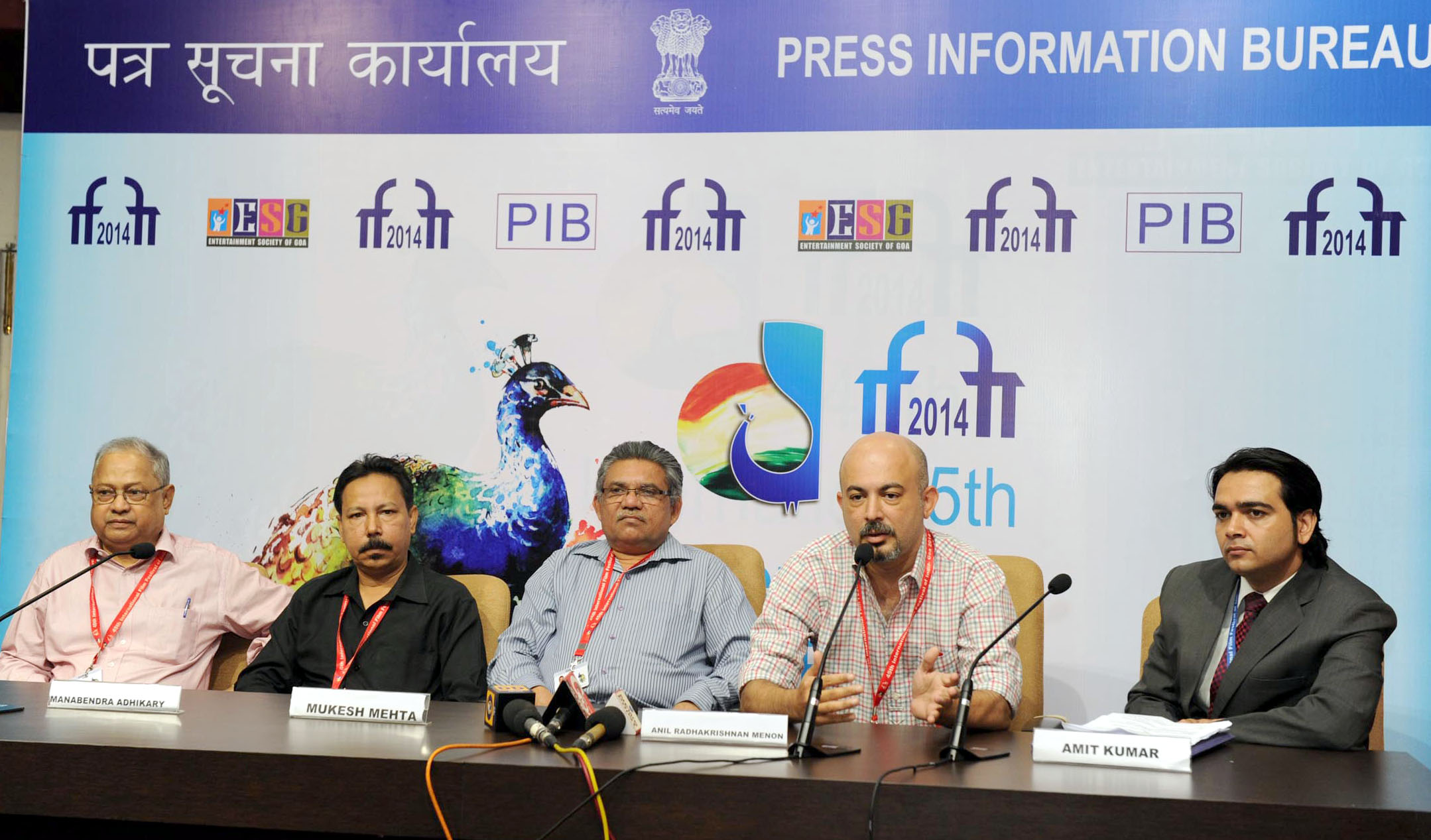
- Adhikary (left) at IFFI 2014
- Born: 17 January 1963 (age 62); Assam, India
- Occupation: Film Producer
- Website: Artha Films

Manabendra Adhikary is a film producer from Assam, India. He was born on 17 January 1963 in Abhayapuri, Bongaigaon. After passing HSLC from Abhayapuri Abhayeswari H.S.M.P. School in 1978, he attended Guwahati Commerce College. After graduating in 1983, he went to Delhi for higher education. After completion of M.Com and MBA, he worked briefly in Delhi and returned to Guwahati in 1990 to start M. Adhikary & Associates, a finance and tax consultancy firm in Uzanbazar. In 2002, he began the construction company M/S Aadarsh Real Estate Pvt. Ltd, and ran his business with subordinates.

His wish to become a filmmaker was inspired by the films of Satyajit Ray, Bhabendra Nath Saikia, and Jahnu Baruah. He began his film career by opening a production house named Artha Films in May 2013, whose objective is to present stories of the day-to-day lives of common people and raise the recognition of the Assamese film industry in India.

== Films ==
Year	Film	Director
2017	Othello	Hemanta Kumar Das
2017	Antareen	Monjul Barua

== Awards ==
- Best Feature Film in Assamese on 62nd National Film Awards
- Best Film Jury Award at Noida International Film Festival.
- Selected for Indian Panorama 2014, Directorate of Film Festivals
- Best Screenplay at Indian Cine Film Festival-14, Mumbai
