= Ranjan Bezbaruah =

Indian singer, lyricist, translator

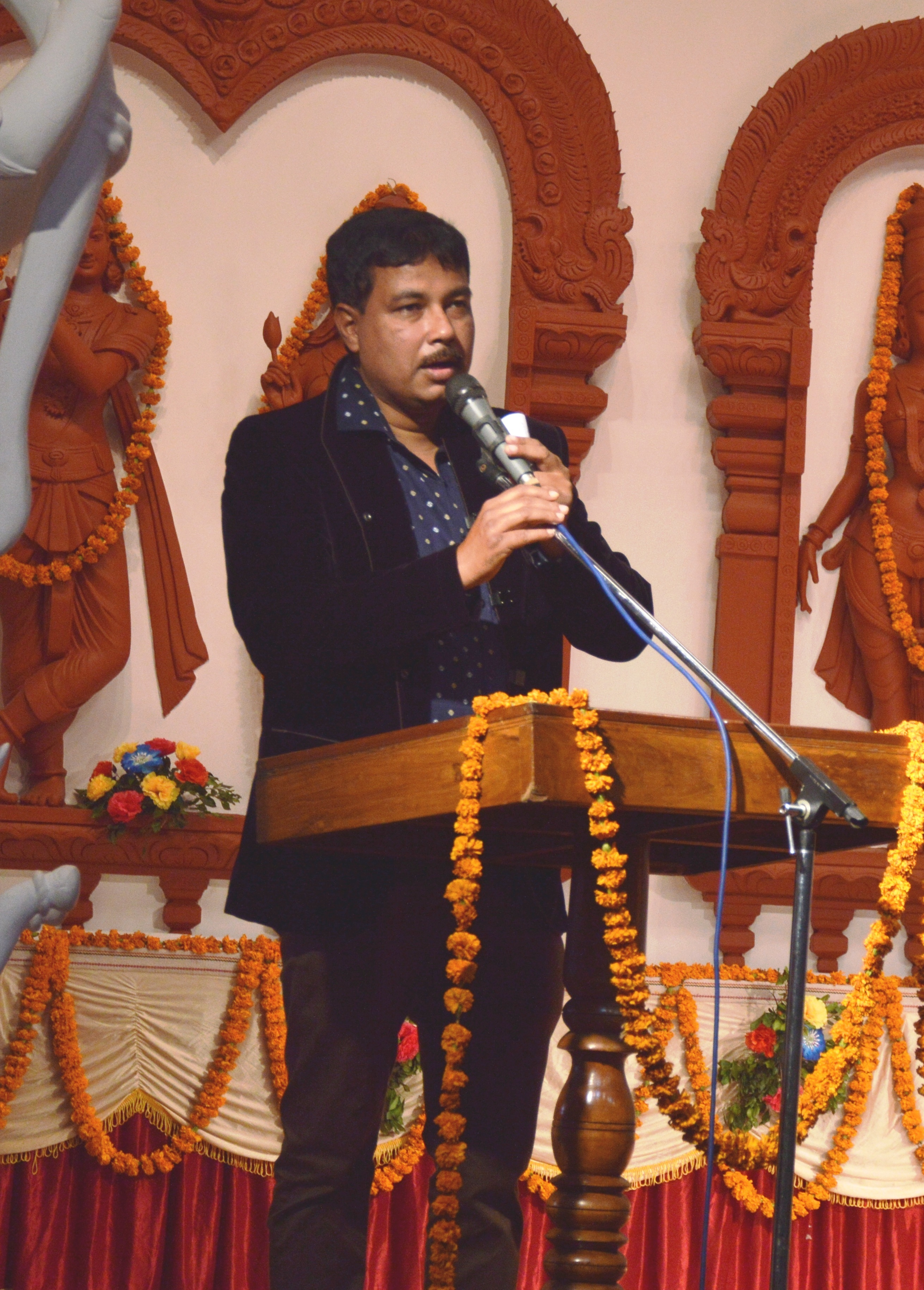
- Born: August 1, 1971 (age 55); Hatichong, Nagaon, Assam
- Education: ADP College; Cotton College; Gauhati University
- Occupations: Singer; Lyricist; Writer; Teacher; Translator
- Spouse: Bornali Parashar
- Children: Mayukhi (Daughter); Jishnu (Son)
- Parent(s): Rohit Chandra Bezbaruah (Father); Sri Subhadra Bezbaruah (Mother)
- Awards: 'Xudhakantha Dr. Bhupen Hazarika Memorial Integration Award' (2014) 'Sanskrita Gayaka' (2019) 'Rashtriya Sanskrit Geetikavi' (2020)

Ranjan Kumar Bezbaruah is an Indian singer, lyricist, translator and academic engaged in promoting Modern Sanskrit Lyrical Literature. He is a vocal artiste of ‘Sanskrit songs’ contributing to All India Radio, Delhi Doordarshan & other regional & national platforms. He was honoured with 'Rashtriya Sanskrit Geetikavi' in 2020.

== Personal life ==
Ranjan Bezbaruah was born on 1 August 1971 in Chakalaghat, Hatichong, Nagaon district of Assam. His father Rohit Chandra Bezbaruah was an educationist, and writer. They have two children, a son Jishnu and a daughter Mayukhi.

== Cultural and academic activity ==
Sanskrit made versions of a number of patriotic Indian songs of the maestros like Rabindranath Tagore & Md. Iqbal, Kazi Nazrul, Kavi Pradeep .

He has been translating popular and patriotic songs from Assamese, Bengali and Hindi into Sanskrit and singing them since 1999.

Presented the Sanskrit rendition of the patriotic song- Md. Iqbal's 'Sare Jahan se Accha' which was produced and published by the national media, DDNews, Delhi for the first time, on the grand occasion of India's 70th independence day, on 14 August 2016. It was translated and sung by Ranjan Bezbaruah along with other vocalists.

He started 'Prachyaa', the first Sanskrit band from North East India and second in India in 2017.

== Awards ==
Award	Place	Year	Notes
Xudhakantha Dr. Bhupen Hazarika Memorial Integration Award	Jorhat, Assam	2014	
Sanskrita Gayaka	Tripura University	2019	
Rashtriya Sanskrit Geetikavi	Lokbhasha Prachar Samitih, Bhubaneswar	2020	
Sadhana Award	Asam Sahitya Sabha, Nagaon Chapter	2023	
