= Moloya Goswami =

Indian actress

Malaya Goswami
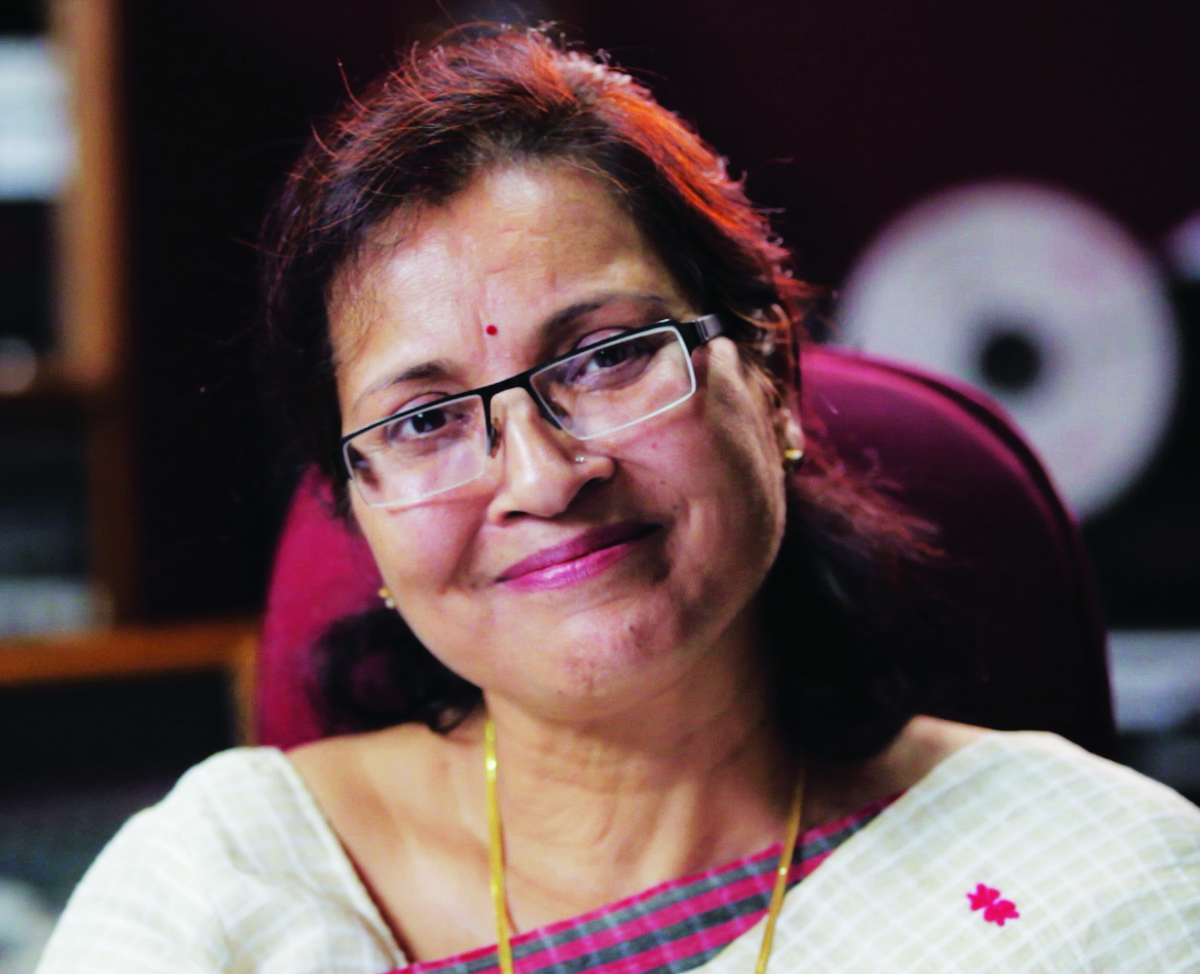
- Malaya Goswami at TeachAids recording in 2013
- Occupation: Actress
- Spouse: Pradip Goswami
- Children: Nishita Goswami

Moloya Goswami is an Indian actress who works in Assamese cinema. Her notable films include Agnisnan, Firingoti and Calendar. In the 39th National Film Awards 1992, she won the Best Actress award for her performance in the Firingoti.

== Personal life ==
Moloya married Pradip Goswami in 1981. The couple has two daughters, Nimisha Goswami and Nishita Goswami, who is also an actress.

== Filmography ==
- Calendar (2017)
- Bhal Pabo Najanilu (2013)
- Poley Poley Urey Mon (2011)
- Srimanta Sankardeva (2010)
- Jeevan Baator Logori (2009)
- Hold My Hand (2008)
- Konikar Ramdhenu (Ride on the Rainbow) (2003)
- Sesh Upahar (2001)
- Daman: A Victim of Marital Violence (2001)
- I killed him, Sir (1995)
- Firingoti (The Spark) (1992)
- Uttarkaal (1990)
- Siraj (1988)
- Sarbajan (1985)
- Maa (1986)
- Agnisnaan (1985)
