= Rengoni =

Assamese language Indian TV channel

- Logo used since 2013
- Country: India
- Headquarters: Guwahati, Assam, India

Programming
- Language: Assamese

Ownership
- Owner: A M Television Pvt. Ltd.
- Sister channels: Prag News

History
- Launched: 3 June 2013; 12 years ago

Links
- Website: www.rengonitv.com

Rengoni is an Assamese language general entertainment television channel owned by A M Television Pvt. Ltd. of Guwahati, Assam. This channel was launched on 3 June 2013. This channel provides various differentiated programs. The Rengoni TV is available without any subscription, mostly on all the DTH/ Cable TV platforms. It is a free-to-air TV channel.

== Currently broadcast ==
Show	Release	Episode
Beharbari Outpost	7 October 2013	3564
Adoror Achore	27 February 2023	236
Henguliya	5 June 2023	154
Chaknoiya	5 June 2023	153
Abelir Rodali	1 May 2023	184

== Formerly broadcast ==
=== Comedy series ===
Name	Release	Episode Count	End
Amar Khapla Village	15 February 2021	88	29 May 2021
Eke Duiye Baro	2 November 2020	88	13 February 2021
Sundarpur Guest House	16 October 2017	327	18 January 2019
Lockdown (Drama + Comedy)	27 April 2020	N/A	28 November 2020

- Bhola Bhai MBBS
- Centu Da
- Cut to Cut
- Khepo Mama
- Khisiri
- Premananda
- Netro Kair Sansar

=== Drama series ===
Name	Release	Episode Count	End
Alpona	21 January 2019	228	1 November 2019
Antaheen	21 February 2022	113	2 July 2022
Aparajita	N/A	349	27 April 2018
Avatar	15 March 2021	118	31 July 2021
Balighar	3 January 2022	106	7 May 2022
Begum Jaan	6 July 2020	132	2 January 2021
Chenichampa	9 May 2022	150	29 October 2022
Devi	30 July 2018	160	2 March 2019
Dorioli	2 March 2020	105	4 July 2020
Duborir Dolisa	6 September 2021	102	1 January 2022
Ekuki Torar Puhor	1 August 2022	174	29 April 2023
Hridoyer Gaan	31 October 2022	113	11 March 2023
Jajabor	16 January 2022	28	24 July 2022
Junak Erabate	10 October 2022	120	25 February 2023
Kajal Priya	15 June 2020	84	19 September 2020
Kasiyoli Rowd	4 January 2021	111	15 May 2021
Khiriki	15 January 2020	65	4 April 2020
Khoj	5 November 2018	256	14 September 2019
Logon	13 March 2023	40	29 April 2023
Mayabini	8 november 2021	298	22 October 2022
Meghali Hopun	24 October 2022	190	3 June 2023
Momota	30 November 2020	85	13 March 2021
Nayana Weds Nibir	17 February 2020	56	24 April 2020
Nedekha Fagun	17 May 2021	150	6 November 2021
Panchali	6 December 2021	124	30 April 2022
Parijat	4 July 2022	126	26 November 2022
Prajapati	N/A	64	27 July 2018
Radha	28 November 2022	202	22 July 2023
Radhika	21 September 2020	148	13 March 2021
Rajkumari	24 July 2023	112	2 December 2023
Rakhe Hori Mare Kune	31 May 2021	102	25 September 2021
Rodali - Ek Aaxar Rengoni	4 March 2019	76	1 June 2019
Roja Rani	2 August 2021	310	30 Jul 2022
Runjun Nupure Maate	9 May 2022	72	30 Jul 2022
Sagarika	4 November 2019	84	29 February 2020
Sandhyaraag	2 May 2022	53	2 July 2022
Sendur	1 August 2022	60	8 October 2022
Swabhiman	4 January 2021	207	4 September 2021

- Aaina
- Aparupa
- Astitwa
- Chandrawali
- Epahi Sukh Epahi Dukh
- Karna : Anya Ek Maharathi
- Ki Naam Di Matim
- Kun Mur Apun
- Moromor Anuradha
- Pratichobi
- Urania Mon
- Yeh Dosti
- 4 idiots

=== Reality Show ===
Name	Release	Episode Count	End
Naach - The Celebs Battle	22 June 2019	22	15 September 2019

- Art Axom Art
- Club 8
- Dance Assam Dance
- Family No.1
- Grihini Superstar Season 1
- Grihini Superstar Season 2
- Junior Super Dancer
- Just Dance
- Jugalbandi
- Moi Zubeen Garg Hobo Bisaru
- North East Got Talent Season 1
- North East Got Talent Season 2
- North East Got Talent Season 3
- Rupohi : The Makeover Show
- Xun Pabo Kune

=== Thriller ===
Name	Release	Episode Count	End
Aparadh Anusandhan	27 September 2021	125	19 February 2022
Agents-The Crime Branch Season 1	16 January 2022	15	24 April 2022
Agents-The Crime Branch Season 2	1 may 2022	7	

=== Others ===
- Mukuta Mukuta Gaan
- Swargam Mix Masala
- Aloukik: ledibag aaru ket nuwaror kahini (Miraculous: Tales of Ladybug and Cat Noir)

== See also ==
- List of longest-running Indian television series
- List of Assamese-language television channels
