= Othello (2014 film) =

- Directed by: Hemanta Kumar Das
- Written by: Ranjit Sharma
- Screenplay by: Ranjit Sharma
- Produced by: Manabendra Adhikary
- Starring: Jupitora Bhuyan; Arup Baishya; Arun Nath
- Cinematography: Nahid
- Music by: Tarali Sarma
- Production company: Artha Films
- Release dates: 2014 (International Film Festival of India); 31 March 2017; (Theatrical)
- Country: India
- Language: Assamese

Othello is a 2014 Indian Assamese language drama film directed by Hemanta Kumar Das and produced by Manabendra Adhikary under the banner of Artha Films. the film features Jupitora Bhuyan and Arup Baishya in lead roles.

Assamese feature film Othello has won the award for best screenplay in the Indian Cine Film Festival-14 held in Mumbai today, a press release stated. The film has story and screenplay by Ranjit Sarma. With music by Tarali Sarma, the film has been directed by Hemanta Kumar Das. The cinematography is by Nahid. Othello was selected in ‘Indian Showcase’ Jagran Film Festival, Mumbai along with 24 other Indian films.

This is the first Assamese film which has a call girl as its lead woman character, claims Ranjit Sarma.

== Release ==
The film was screened at the Indian Panorama section in the International Film Festival of India in Goa in November, 2014. The film will be released in theatres across Assam during the Rongali Bihu.
