= Ahetuk =

- Directed by: Bani Das
- Produced by: Raj Kumar Jain
- Starring: Gunjan Bhardwaj; Amrita Gogoi; Tapan Das; Sayan Chakravarty; Prithiraj Rava; Ashwini Bhuyan; Rajiv Kro
- Cinematography: Nahid Ahmed
- Edited by: Sanjeev Borthakur
- Music by: Poran Borkatoky (jojo)
- Release date: 2 January 2015
- Country: India
- Language: Assamese
- Box office: est. ₹1 crore

Ahetuk is a 2015 Indian Assamese language romantic thriller film directed by Bani Das, veteran Assamese film director and a screenwriter who delivered the Assamese audiences some blockbusters like Maharathi, Mon, Kadambari. His movies are popularly known for an individualistic stamp of visual splendor which is a combine package of romance, action and drama. Ahetuk is another entertainment package, with Gunjan Bhardwaj and Amrita Gogoi in lead role. Actor Tapan Das is also playing an important character in this film. A deep quest for the meaning of those aspects of life which are really meaningless! That's ‘Ahetuk’ for you—a journey in celluloid that tries to depict how we chase our desires in life and often hit a blank wall of nothingness. Produced by Raj Kumar Jain this film was released on 2 January 2015.

== Plot summary ==
The story is about two passionate journalists Raj (Gunjan Bhardwaj) and Joyeeta (Amrita Gogoi) who set out to get at the truth of a story to the extent of putting their lives in jeopardy. At the end, surprisingly, they find they have been used by certain vested interests. The step they would take thereafter is something none could fathom. The moral of the story—people or the society must not play with the budding minds or sentiments of Gen X or the younger generation.

== Cast ==
- Gunjan Bhardwaj as Raj
- Amrita Gogoi as Joyeeta
- Tapan Das as Mr Borbora
- Sayan Chakravarty as Rakesh
- Prithiraj Rava as Minister
- Ashwini Bhuyan
- Rajiv Kro as Bailung
- Prastuti Porasor (guest appearance)
- Zubeen Garg (guest appearance)

== Soundtrack ==
Ahetuk

Soundtrack album by Poran Borkatoky
- Released: 23 December 2014
- Genre: Feature film soundtrack
- Length: 25:05
- Language: Assamese
- Label: Times Music

The music of the film is composed by Poran Borkatoky (JoJo). The album contains 6 tracks.

Tracklist
No.	Title	Lyrics	Artist(s)	Length
1.	"Ahetuk"	Ibson lal Baruah	Zubeen Garg	4:23
2.	"Meghar Jalonga"	Ibson lal Baruah	Pompi Gogoi	3:26
3.	"Lahe Lahe"	Bani Das	Zubeen Garg	5:13
4.	"Nonsense Hridoye"	Rajdweep	Kalpana Patowary	4:15
5.	"Meghar Jalonga - Reprise"	Ibson lal Baruah	Pompi Gogoi	4:52
6.	"Ahetuk Dub Mix"	Ibson lal Baruah	Zubeen Garg	4:21
Total length:				25:05
