= Prag News =

- Logo used until 2020
- Country: India
- Broadcast area: India
- Network: 576i SDTV
- Headquarters: Ulubari, Guwahati, Assam, India

Programming
- Language: Assamese

Ownership
- Owner: Prag Network (AM Television Pvt Ltd)
- Key people: Dr Sanjive Narain, CMD; Dr Akshata Narain, President; Prasanta Rajguru, Editor-in-Chief; Chandra Sekhar Sarmah, General Manager
- Sister channels: Rengoni

History
- Launched: 4 March 2001; 25 years ago

Links
- Website: pragnews.com

Prag News is an Indian 24x7 Assamese-language news channel. The channel has many times shared false claims and fake news through their platform. It is one of the oldest local news channels of Assam based in Guwahati.

It was launched on 4 March 2001 as a cable-based television channel. The channel covers local, national and international news and various other programs.

== History ==
Prag News was launched on 4 March 2001 as a cable-based news channel and later expanded into satellite broadcasting. The channel is headquartered in Ulubari, Guwahati, and serves audiences across Assam and Northeast India.

Over the years, Prag News has expanded its operations through television, web publishing, social media platforms and digital streaming services.

== Programming ==
The channel broadcasts:

- News bulletins
- Political discussions and debates
- Current affairs programmes
- Interviews and special reports
- Election coverage
- Cultural and entertainment programmes

== Prag Cine Awards ==
Prag News instituted the Prag Cine Awards in 2003 to recognise achievements in Assamese cinema. The awards later expanded to include films from other northeastern states of India. The event has become one of the prominent film award ceremonies in the region.

== Digital Presence ==
Prag News operates an online news portal and streams live television content through digital platforms. The channel also maintains a significant presence on social media and video-sharing platforms. Official website Official YouTube channel Official Facebook page Official Instagram page

== Key people ==
- Dr Sanjive Narain, Chairman/Managing Director
- Dr Akshata Narain, President
- Prasanta Rajguru, Editor-in-Chief
- Chandra Sekhar Sarmah, General Manager
- Debajit Bhuyan, Executive Editor
- Dilip Gope, Technical Head
- Sanjit Das, IT Head
- Rubul Gogoi, Chief Reporter
- Samarjyoti Sarma, Journalist (Crime Reporter)
- Khanindra Kr.Deka, Associate Editor
- Pranjal Phukon, Joint Editor
- Nabanita Kalita, News Editor
- Dhiraj Ray Medhi , Output Editor
- Gautam Nath ,Political Editor
- Pranab Saikia ,Input Editor
- Apurba Deka ,Head HR & Admin
- Karishma Das, Operation Head
- Rana Kalita, HR & Admin Executive
- Atanu Borthakur, Chief Coordinator
- Deepa Sonar ,Admin Executive
- Riju Phukan ,Front Office Executive
- Shoubhik Roy Choudhury ,Digital Ops Head
- Sunoyana Phukon ,Sr Programme Producer
- Samir Ranjan Goswami ,Sr Programme Producer
- Chitta Ranjan Deka, COO
- Bhargav Baishya ,Head of Regional Sales
- Amarjit Nath ,Head of Ops-Marketing
- Neelotpal Baruah ,Chief Manager (Scheduling & Advt Ops)
- Prasanta Pratim ,Dutta Chief Reporter
- Ramu Basfore ,Head- Camera Dept
- Biswajit Gogoi ,Chief Video Editor
- Rubul Gogoi, Journalist
- Bobita Gogoi, Journalist
- Samar Jyoti Sarma, Journalist
- Bhaskar Jyoti Sarma, Journalist
- Iftikar Choudhury, Journalist
- Nayan Jyoti Bhuyan, Journalist
- Nilkamal Kalita, Journalist
- Debojit Gogoi, Journalist
- Amar Jyoti Boruah, Journalist
- Bhuban Chetia, Journalist
- Karabi Deka, Journalist
- Bikash Adhikari, Journalist
- Syed Ashik Hussain, Journalist
- Ranjan Sahu, Journalist
- Ajit Kumar Saikia, Bureau Chief - Middle Assam
- Jogen Sutradhar, Bureau Chief - Lower Assam
- Kushal Saikia, Bureau Chief - North Bank
- Abhijit Bhattacharya, Bureau Chief - Barak Valley
- Biplob Chetia, Tinsukia Reporter
- Anil Kumar Poddar, Dibrugarh Reporter
- Bhairab Munda, Sivasagar Reporter
- Uttam Saikia, Jorhat Reporter
- Girin Bora, Golaghat Reporter
- Dipen Bora, Diphu Reporter
- Lasman Sarmah, Hojai Reporter
- Sanjib Hazarika, Tezpur Reporter
- Dulal Deka, Mangaldoi Reporter
- Jitumoni Deka, Udalguri Reporter
- Diganta Kalita, Barpeta Reporter
- Subhash Das, Nalbari Reporter
- Rajib Deori, Dhemaji Reporter
- Saidur Rahman, Dhubri Reporter
- Mitali Devi, Morigaon Reporter
- Chitta Ranjan Singha, Bongaigaon Reporter
- Dudhnath Singh, Kokrajhar Reporter
- Rahul Paul, Sribhumi Reporter
- Jagtar Singh, Biswanath Reporter
- Gautam Gogoi, Charaideo Reporter
- Dilip Gogoi, Video Journalist
- Rinto Hazarika, Video Journalist
- Riju Das, Video Journalist
- Himangsu Bora, Video Journalist
- Raju Bora, Video Journalist

== Awards ==
- Awarded Best Mass Communication Award in the year 2003 & 2004.
- Awarded by the Newspaper Association of India for Best Regional Channel for its contribution to the North East in 2011.
- Winner of the NEBCUS Media Award 2011 & 2012."Prag News". Sribd.

== See also ==
- List of Assamese-language television channels
