= Barsha Rani Bishaya =

Indian actress

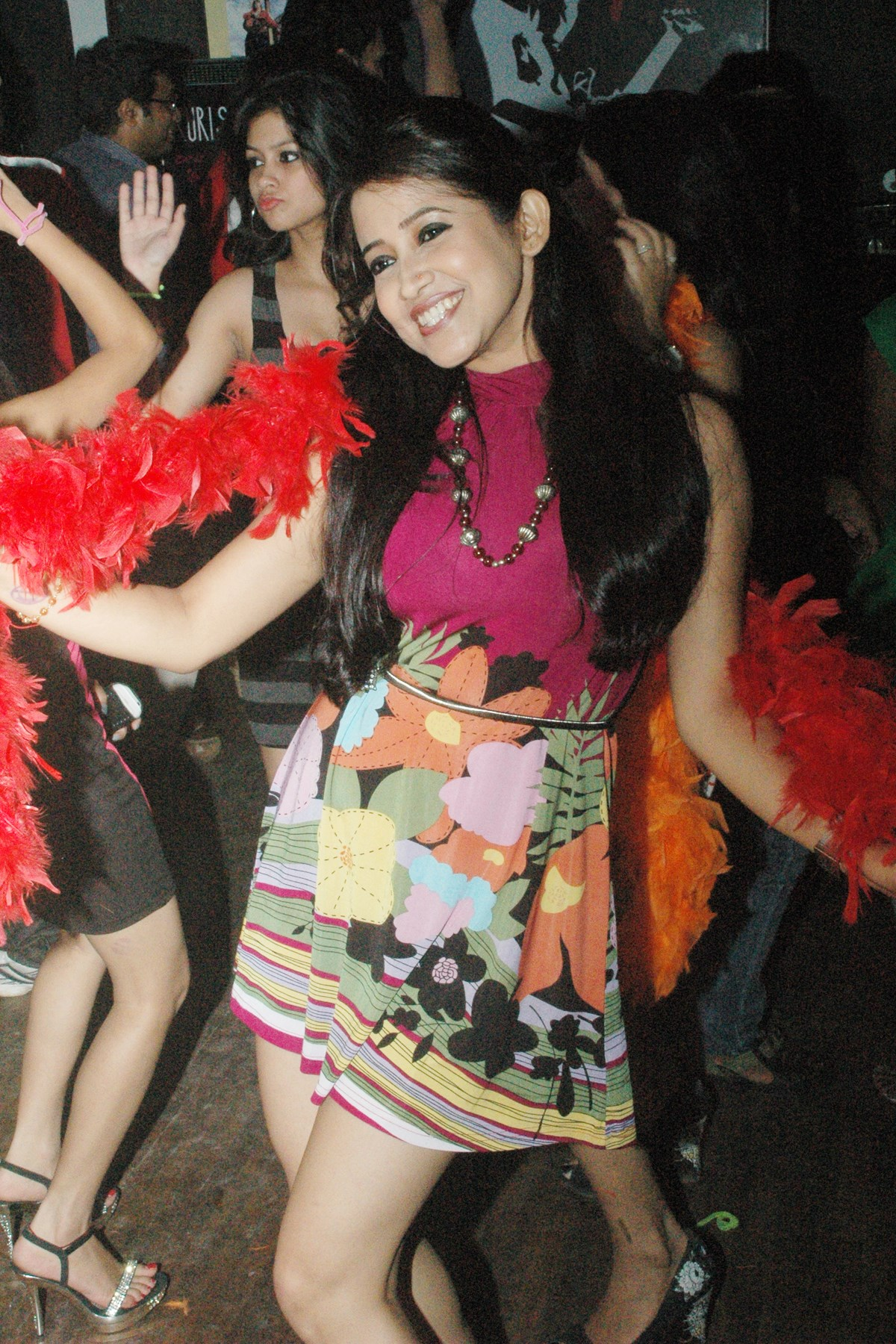
- Born: 20 September 1986; Guwahati, Assam, India
- Occupations: Actress, Choreographer, Folk Dancer
- Years active: 1998 - Present
- Spouse: Bhaskar Boruah (m. 2021)
- Parents: Ashok Kumar Bishaya (father); Happy Moni Bishaya (mother)
- Relatives: Ankur Bishaya (Brother)

Barsha Rani Bishaya is an Indian actress who works in Assamese cinema. She has acted in commercial and critically acclaimed films like Bidhata, Tumi Aahibaane, Ratnakar, etc. Bishaya is also part of mobile theatre groups of Assam. Apart from acting, she is also a Bihu dancer in Assam. She has also acted in many popular VCD films, hosted TV shows and also acted in television series and telefilms.

== Career ==
In 1998, Bishaya made her debut in Ashok Kumar Bishaya's 'Joubone Aamoni Kore'. Along with the films she has also appeared in various mobile theatres of Assam. In 2009, she acted in Hiren Baruah's 'Basundhara' where she had done a very challenging role and won the 57th National Film Awards for Best Feature Film in Assamese. In 2017, She acted in Prerana Barbarooah's Tumi Aahibaane which did well in the box office. In 2019, she acted in Ratnakar which also did well in the box office.

== Filmography ==
=== Film ===
Key
†	Denotes films that are in production

Year	Film	Director
1998	Joubone Aamoni Kore	Ashok Kumar Bishaya
1999	Bukur Majot Jole	Ashok Kumar Bishaya
2000	Jon Jwole Kopalot	Munna Ahmed
2001	I Love You	Ashok Kumar Bishaya
2002	Jibon Nadir Duti Paar	Munna Ahmed
2002	Mitha Mitha Logonot	Achyut Kumar Bhagawati; Sushanta Majindar Baruah
2002	Maghot Mamonir Biya	Chandra Mudoi
2003	Arpan	Krishna Phukan
2003	Jumon Sumon	Mohibul Haque
2003	Ujonir Dujoni Gabhoru	Chandra Mudoi
2003	Bidhata	Munin Barua
2004	Kuasha (Bengali film)	Milan Bhowmik
2005	Junbai	Rajesh Bhuyan
2005	Hiyar Dapunot Tumare Sobi	Sibanan Baruah
2005	Senai Mur Dhulia	Chandra Mudoi
2009	Dhunia Tirutabur	Prodyut Kumar Deka
2010	Basundhara	Hiren Bora
2011	Tumar Khobor	Rajiv Bora
2011	Poley Poley Urey Mon	Timothy Das Hanche
2012	Me and My Sister	Rajesh Bhuyan
2013	Abirato Dhara	Prerana Barbarooah
2014	Jonaki Ali	Prerana Barbarooah
2015	Niyor Pai Mukoli Hol	Prerana Barbarooah
2015	Khel - The Game	Ashok Kumar Bishaya
2017	Tumi Aahibane	Prerana Barbarooah
2017	Priyar Priyo	Munin Barua
2018	Raktabeez	Biswajeet Bora
2019	Ratnakar	Jatin Bora
2022	Rajneeti - Part 1	Manujit Sharma
2022	Guwahati Diaries	Prasant Saikia
2025	Joubone Amoni Kore 2	Ashok Kumar Bishaya

=== Short film/web series ===
Year	Title	Role	Note
2020	Tell Me It's Grey	Barsha	
2021	Fisaa (Web Series)	Jahnabi	
2021	Sorry	Varsha	
2022	Wrong Number		

== Awards and nominations ==
Year	Awards	Films	Category	Result	Reference
2013	Prag Cine Awards	Me & My Sister	Best Actor Female	Won	
2016	Prag Cine Awards	Khel-The Game	Best Actor Female	Nominated	
2021	Prag Cine Awards	Ratnakar	Best Actor Female	Won	
