= Basundhara (2009 film) =

Basundhara ... the earth
- Theatrical release poster
- Directed by: Hiren Bora
- Written by: Hiren Bora
- Screenplay by: Hiren Bora; Sagar Sangam Sarkar; Birinchi Kumar Medhi
- Produced by: Hiren Bora
- Starring: Bishnu Kharghoria; Barsha Rani Bishaya; Saurav Hazarika; Ifftikar Ahmed; Prithiraj Rabha
- Cinematography: Vivek Banerjee
- Edited by: Ashit Basu
- Music by: Tarali Sarma
- Production companies: Surabhi Enterprise (TV and Film Division)
- Release dates: 13 November 2009 (Kolkata); 15 January 2010
- Running time: 113 minutes
- Country: India
- Language: Assamese

Basundhara (English: The Earth) is a 2009 Indian Assamese drama film directed and produced by Hiren Bora, with a screenplay by Sagar Sangam Sarkar, Birinchi Kumar Medhi and Bora himself. It stars Barsha Rani Bishaya in the title role, and Saurav Hazarika, Bishnu Kharghoria, Ifftikar Ahmed, and Prithiraj Rabha in other major roles. The film deals with a pressing contemporary ecological issue of human-elephant conflict in the region of Assam.

Basundhara won the Best Feature Film in Assamese award in the 57th National Film Awards for 2009.

== Plot ==
The wild elephants living in the forest terrain of Sundarpur have been making life difficult for its inhabitants with their frequent attacks. Shattered by her fiancé's infidelity, Basundhara (Barsha Rani Bishaya), a young NGO activist arrives at Sundarpur with the agenda to change the mindset of villagers towards the need for conservation of flora and fauna. But the villagers have failed to understand her intention, and her first meeting with them turns out to be a total fiasco. Incidentally, she comes in contact with Arjun (Saurabh Hazarika), a local young journalist. Arjun reveals to her how a large area of the forest has been cleared for illegal trafficking of ivory and timber and also for setting up of a stone quarry by Bikash Barua (Ifftikar Ahmed), a forest contractor-cum-local mafia, with the help of dishonest forest officials. Basundhara then realises the real reason behind driving the elephants to attack the village. She determines to fight against this and forms her own team of volunteers, composed of village youth who earlier worked for Bikash Barua. She starts welfare activities for the underprivileged people.

At her insistence, Arjun publishes a report in the newspaper which is a searing expose of the illegal activities of Bikash Barua and his associates. Basundhara's mother, who now stays alone in the city, dies under mysterious circumstances. Basundhara and her team members are also threatened by the miscreants to stop the mission. But she decides not to quit Sundarpur and her mission. The situation takes a different turn. In view of the forthcoming elections, the dishonest ranger is transferred and an honest officer joins in his place. He provides all support to Basundhara. She collects substantial proof to expose Bikash Barua and finally achieves her goal.

== Cast ==
- Barsha Rani Bishaya as Basundhara, a young NGO activist
- Saurabh Hazarika as Arjun, a young local journalist of Sundarpur
- Iftekar Ahmed as Bikash Barua, a corrupt businessman of Sundarpur
- Bishnu Khargharia
- Prithiraj Rabha
- Bhagawat Pritam
- Moitreyee Goswami
- Bhranti Medhi
- Rita Bora

== Release ==
Basundhara was the first Assamese language film to release in 2010. It was released on 15 January 2010 initially at Cinemax, Guwahati with inauguration by the chief minister of Assam Tarun Gogoi.

=== Film Festivals ===
The film was screened in many film festivals prior to its theatrical release. It includes 15th Kolkata International Film Festival, Kolkata (13 November 2009), 8th Third Eye Asian Film Festival, Mumbai (2009) and 8th Pune International Film Festival, Pune (2010). Later it was also screened as India Habitat Film Festival, New Delhi (2010), Thrissur International Film Festival, Kerala (2010), South Asian Film Festival, Goa (2010) etc.

== Reception ==
=== Critical reception ===
The film was generally met with positive reviews by critics. The Telegraph termed it as "simple, clear and flawless." Eastern Panorama also praised the film along with its cinematography, music and acting. The acting of the cast, especially Barsha Rani Bishaya in the lead role, was also widely appreciated.

== Music ==
The music of the film was directed by Tarali Sarma. It features only one song, penned by noted lyricist Dr Birinchi Kumar Medhi, sung by the music director herself.

== Awards ==
The film won the Best Feature Film in Assamese award in the 57th National Film Awards for 2009. It also received Rup Kunwar Jyoti Prasad Agarwalla Award for Best film along with eight other major award at Assam Film Award, 2010 awarded by the cultural department of government of Assam. Other awards includes Best feature film along with nine awards at Moon Light Media Awards 2009–10.
