= Tarali Sarma =

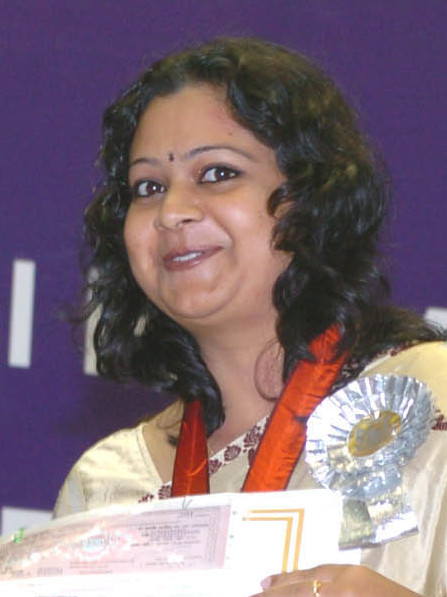
- Tarali Sarma in 2005

Background information
- Born: 4 August 1975 (age 50); North Guwahati, Assam, India
- Genres: Classical, Folk, Indipop
- Occupations: Playback singer, musician, composer,
- Instrument: Vocal
- Years active: 1995-presents
- Label: Many
- Website: taralisarma.com

Tarali Sarma is an Indian singer from Assam, who won the National Film Award for Best Female Playback Singer in 2003 for the Assamese film Akashitorar Kothare. Her father was Prabhat Sarma, a folk exponent, flutist, music director, and Sangeet Natak Akademi Awardee. Tarali is a versatile singer and music director in the Assamese film industry. She has composed music for films such as Akashitorar Kothare, Laaz, Jatra the Passage, Basundhara, and Abhijatri, among others. She has also released several albums, including Abhixari Priya, Sonjoni, Sankar Madhav, Sneh, Pohar, Tarali, Henguliya, and Bargit. Her album list also includes Abhimaan, Prajapati, and Nayanmoni (with Krishnamani Nath), Mukoli, etc.

Tarali Sarma performed in Valley Forge, Pennsylvania, during Assam 2009 organized by the Assam Society of America. She also performed in Colorado Springs, Colorado, during Assam 2010 organized by the Assam Society of America.

Tarali Sarma is the music director of Life in a Puppet, an Assamese film that has received several awards at the Port Blair International Film Festival. She also composed music for Xubala, an Assamese film that has been selected for screening at the Lift-off Sessions Film Festival 2020 in the UK and the Lift-off Sessions Film Festival 2020 in Hollywood.

== Awards ==
- Best Female Playback Singer in 51st National Film Awards (2003).
