= Prag Cine Awards North-East 2017 =

- Date: 17 June 2017– 18 June 2017
- Site: Bodofa Sports Complex, Kokrajhar, Assam, India
- Organized by: Prag AM Television Pvt. Ltd.

Television coverage
- Channel: Prag News

Prag Cine Awards North-East 2017 was a ceremony that took place at Kokrajhar, Assam, on 17 and 18 June 2017, organized by the Prag television network, that honoured films made in 2016 in Assam and the rest of Northeast India that had been censored by India's Central Board of Film Certification.

== Winners and nominees ==
In this edition of Prag Cine Awards, awards were given in 26 different categories to the Assamese films produced from Assam and other language films produced from Northeast India which were censored in 2016. Maj Rati Keteki topped the nomination list with ten nominations.

=== Awards for films from Assam ===
Winners are listed first and highlighted in boldface.

Best Film	Best Popular Film
**Antardrishti**; Dikchow Banat Palaax; Maj Rati Keteki	**Doordarshan Eti Jantra**; Bahniman; Gaane Ki Aane
Best Director	Best Debut Director
**Kangkan Deka – Beautiful Lives**; Sanjib Sabhapandit – Dikchow Banat Palaax; Santwana Bardoloi – Maj Rati Keteki; Dhruva J Bordoloi – Dooronir Nirola Poja	**Dhruva J Bordoloi – Dooronir Nirola Poja**; Deep Choudhury – Alifa; Jaicheng Jai Dohutia – Haanduk; Rima Das – Antardrishti
Best Actor Male	Best Actor Female
**Bishnu Kharghoria – Antardrishti**; Mintu Barua – Dooronir Nirola Poja; Jatin Bora – Doordarshan Eti Jantra and Bahniman; Baharul Islam – Alifa; Boloram Das – Beautiful Lives	**Pakiza Begum – Beautiful Lives**; Prastuti Parashar – Doordarshan Eti Jantra; Amrita Gogoi – Dur; Parineeta Borthakur – Gaane Ki Aane; Jaya Seal Ghosh – Alifa
Best Supporting Actor Male	Best Supporting Actor Female
**Bibhuti Bhushan Hazarika – Dooronir Nirola Poja and Maj Rati Keteki**; Arun Hazarika – Bahniman; Rupam Chetia – Aei Matite; Chinmoy Chakraborty – Dikchow Banat Palaax	**Pranami Bora – Maj Rati Keteki and Doordarshan Eti Jantra**; Ashrumoni Bora – Beautiful Lives; Meena Ingti – Aei Matite; Sulakshana Baruah – Maj Rati Keteki
Best Music Direction	Best Lyrics
**Anurag Saikia – Antardrishti and Maj Rati Keteki**; Zubeen Garg – Gaane Ki Aane; Bhagawat Pritam – Beautiful Lives; Tony Basumatary and Utkarsh – Dooronir Nirola Poja	**Ibson Lal Baruah – Kunwarpuror Kunwar - Hahi Eti Pindhi Lowa**; Rajdweep – Bahniman - Kola Kola Andhar; Santwana Bordoli – Maj Rati Keteki - Akash Xunuwali; Kalpajyoti Dutta – Dur - Xex Kio Hoi
Best Playback Singer Male	Best Playback Singer Female
**Rupam Bhuyan – Maj Rati Keteki - Akash Xunuwali**; Zubeen Garg – Gaane Ki Aane - Janu Janu Moiyu Janu; Papon – Dooronir Nirola Poja - Khuje Khuje Jiban; Nilotpal Bora – Dur - Bisoara Xomoi	**Rupa Mili – Li:Len**; Mizee – Dur - Akashe Aki Diya; Tarali Sarma – Sarvagunakar Srimanta Sankardeva; Rupjyoti Devi – Bahniman
Best Cinematography	Best Editing
**Nahid Ahmed – Alifa**; Pankaj Baral Chetri – Li:Len; Suraj Deka – Dooronir Nirola Poja; Chidaa Bora – Haanduk	**Dhruva J Bordoloi – Dooronir Nirola Poja**; Dhiraj Mazumdar – Shakira Ahibo Bakul Tolor Bihuloi; Saurabh Dutta – Dikchow Banat Palaax; Gagan Raj – Doordarshan Eti Jantra
Best Screenplay	Best Choreography
**Rima Das – Antardristri**; Dhruba J Bordoloi – Dooronir Nirola Poja; Kangkan Deka – Beautiful Lives; Sanjib Sabhapandit – Dikchow Banat Palaax	**Bhaskar Dole and Agam Kutum – Oienga**; Ashim Gogoi – Dur; Smita Lahkar – Aei Matite; Pankaj Ingti – Kunwarpuror Konwar
Best Sound Design	Best Art Direction
**Amrit Pritam – Antardrishti and Beautiful Lives**; Debajit Gayan – Dikchow Banat Palaax and Haanduk; Debajit Changma – Haanduk; Anirban Barthakur – Alifa	**Phatik Baruah – Sonar Baran Pakhi**; Jyoti Sankar Bhattacharya – Gaane Ki Aane; Rima Das – Antardrishti; Santwana Bordoloi and Usma Bordoloi – Maj Rati Keteki; Nuruddin Ahmed – Bahniman
Best Makeup	Best Costume Design
**Biswajit Kalita – Beautiful Lives**; Ashitabh Barua (Sanku) – Alifa and Sonar Baran Pakhi; Paran Sarmah – Haanduk; Aku Bothra – Aei Matite	**Rani Dutta Baruah – Maj Rati Keteki**; Ananya Pegu and Nirada Dole Pegu – Oienga; Garima Saikia Garg – Gaane Ki Aane; Rima Das – Antardrishti
Best Film other than Assamese
**Alifa – Bengali**; Haanduk – Moran; Li:Len – Mishing; Ansula Afa – Bodo

=== Awards for films from rest of northeast India ===
Winners are listed first and highlighted in boldface.

Best Film North-East	Best Director North-East
**Loktak Lairembee (Lady Of The Lake) (Manipur, Meitei)**; Dak Bangla (Meghalaya, Khasi)	**Haobam Paban Kumar – Loktak Lairembee (Manipur, Meitei)**; Kitbok Kharmalki – Dak Bangla (Meghalaya, Khasi)
Best Actor North-East Male	Best Actor North-East Female
**Ningthoujam Sanatomba – Loktak Lairembee (Manipur, Meitei)**; Starsing Lymba – Dak Bangla (Meghalaya, Khasi)	**Sylviana Mawlong – Dak Bangla (Meghalaya, Khasi)**; Sagolsam Thambalsang – Loktak Lairembee (Manipur, Meitei)

=== Other awards ===
- Best Book on Film – Xukhi Manuhor Chalachitra Aru Onainyo by Pranjal Bora
- Jury’s Special Mention
  - Mahaendra Rabha (Child Artist, Maj Rati Keteki)
  - Bipasha Daimari (Child Artist, Zero: the value of life)
- Jury Special Honour – Kulada Kumar Bhattacharya (Dikchow Banat Palaax)
- Special Felicitation for Contribution to Assamese Cinema – Rajesh Jashpal (Gaane Ki Aane)
