= Utpal Das =

Indian Assamese actor (born 1986

- Born: 14 December 1986 (age 39); Guwahati, Assam, India
- Occupation: Actor
- Years active: 2004-present

Utpal Das (born 14 December 1986) is an Assamese film actor. His debut Assamese feature film was Dhon Kuberor Dhon in 2009 while his acting debut was through VCD film Ringa Ringa Mon in 2004.

== Career ==
=== Films ===
In 2009, Das made his film debut with Dhon Kuberor Dhon. In 2011, he had a starring role in Munin Baruah's Raamdhenu, which was a major success for the Assamese film industry and led to his casting in more high budget productions. He received critical recognition with a nomination for the Filmfare Awards East award for best actor male for his performance in the film Durjon.

He starred in VCD films such as Ringa Ringa Mon (2004) which is his first acting venture. Other vcd films such as Uroniya Mon (2007), Junaki Mon (2008), Janmoni (2008), Abhimani Mon (2009), Bohagot Birinar Biya (2010) and Moromjaan (2011). In the 2016 film Doordarshan Eti Jantra, he played the role of "Bitul". Some of his notable feature films include Raamdhenu (2011), Rowd (2012), Borolar Ghor (2012), Durjon (2013) and Doordarshan Eti Jantra (2016) and The Underworld (2018).

=== Television ===
Parallel to his later film roles, Das has featured in Assamese television serials: Niyoror Phool (News Live Channel), Anuradha (News Live Channel), Tumi Dusokute Kajol Loley (Rang Channel), Moromor Anuradha (Rengoni), and Auxir Jonak (Rang).

=== Theatre ===
During 2013–2014, Das starred in theatre productions by the touring company Brindabon Theatre, which completed an extensive tour of Assam. He was involved with Theatre Surjya as the lead actor in the session 2018-19.

== Filmography ==
Films

Key
†	Denotes films yet not been released

Year	Films	Co-star	Director
2005	Ringa Ringa Mon	Purabi Sharma	Rajesh Bhuyan
2006	Joon Tora	Jupitora Bhuyan, Rimpi Das	Simple Gogoi
2009	Dhon Kuberor Dhon	Nishita Goswami	Dhiraj Kashyap
2011	Raamdhenu	Nishita Goswami, Prastuti Porasor, Jatin Bora	Munin Barua
2011	Jaanmoni	Jatin Bora, Syamontika Sarma	Rajesh Bhuyan
2012	Rowd	Monali Bordoloi, Diganta Hazarika, Moonmi Phukan	Gautam Baruah
2012	Borolar Ghor	Debashmita Banerjee	Mani C. Kappan
2013	Durjon	Ananya Parashar	Moupran Sharma
2016	Doordarshan Eti Jantra	Jatin Bora, Prastuti Porasor, Moonmi Phukan	Rajesh Bhuyan
2017	Konwarpurar Konwar	Amrita Gogoi	Rajesh Bhuyan
2018	The Underworld	Zubeen Garg, Parineeta Borthakur, Diganta Hazarika	Rajesh Jashpal

== VCD films ==
- Ringa Ringa Mon
- Janmoni 1
- Janmoni 2
- Uronia Mon
- Sunaror Halodhia Hahi
- Chintamoni
- Purnima1
- Purnima2
- Alakananda
- Moromjan 2011
- Faguni
- Priya Milan
- Saneki
- Jonaki Mon

== Television ==
Title	Broadcast Channel
Niyoror Phool	News Live
Anuradha	Rang
Tumi Dusokute Kajol Lole	Rang
Moromor Anuradha	Rengoni
Osin Sinaki	Jonack
Abelir Ramdhenu Tumi Ananya	Rang
Auxir Jonak	Rang
Aahinor Abeli	Rang

== See also ==
- Jatin Bora
- Ravi Sarma
- ৰাগ ঐনিতম
- Barsha Rani Bishaya
