= List of songs recorded by Papon =

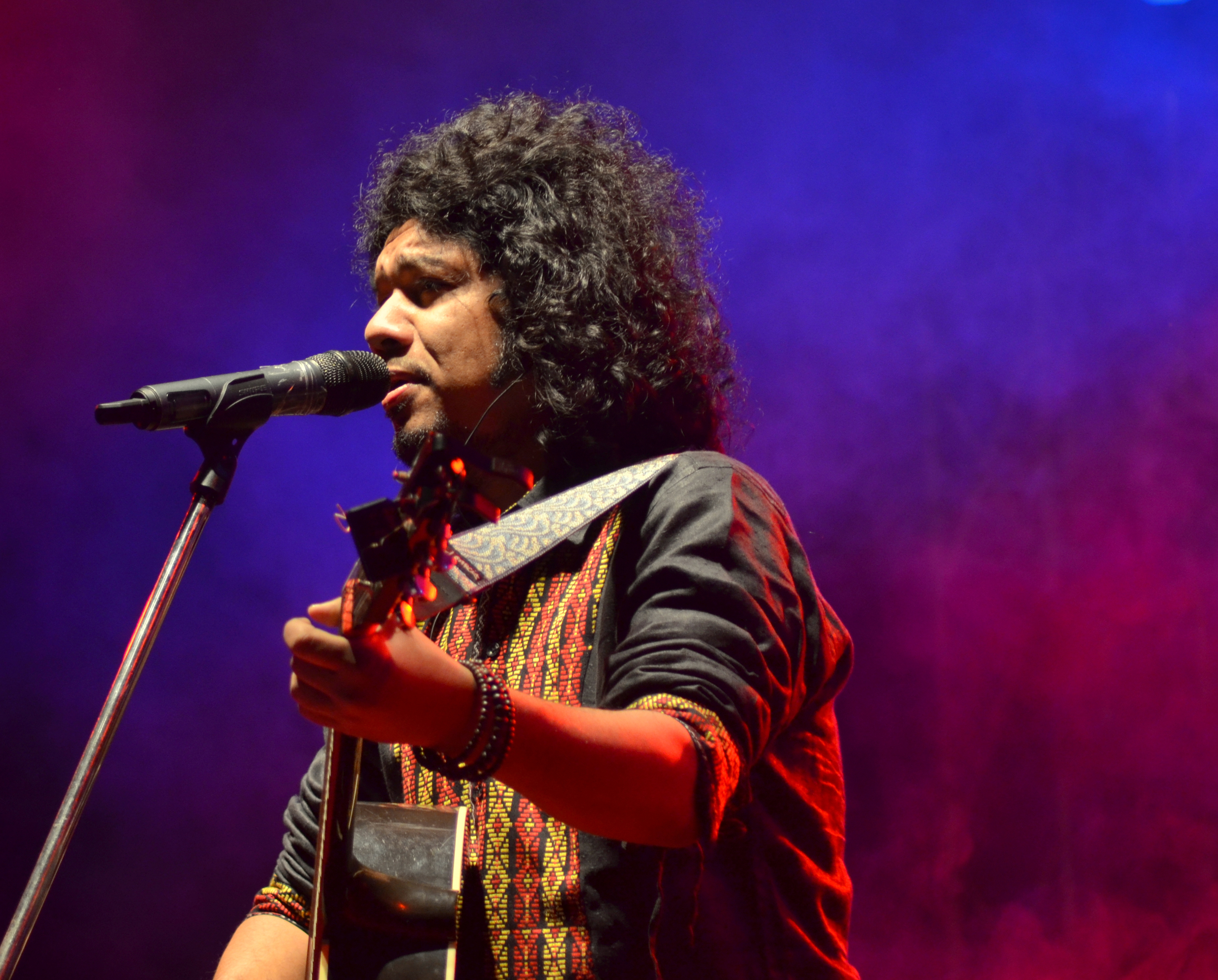
Angaraag Mahanta in 2014

Angaraag "Papon" Mahanta is an Indian playback singer. He lent his voice in numerous songs of different languages including Assamese, Hindi, Bengali, Tamil, Marathi, Urdu, Mishing, Bodo, Tiwa, Punjabi and Odia. This article lists songs recorded by Angaraag Mahanta.

== Hindi film songs ==
Year	Film	Song	Composer(s)	Writer(s)	Co - Singer(s)	Notes	Ref.
2006	Strings - Bound By Faith	"Mantra (Om)"	Zubeen Garg	Baba Nagarjun	Zubeen Garg, Sourain Roy Choudhuri	Debut Song in Bollywood	
2011	Soundtrack	"Banao"	MIDIval Punditz, Karsh Kale				
2011	Soundtrack	"Naina Laagey"	MIDIval Punditz, Karsh Kale				
2011	I Am Kalam	"Zindagi Aisi Waisi"	Abhishek Ray, Madhuparna, Papon, Susmit Bose, Shivji Dholi				
2011	Dum Maaro Dum	"Jiyein Kyun"	Pritam	Jaideep Sahni			
2012	Barfi!	"Kyon"	Pritam	Neelesh Misra	Sunidhi Chauhan		
2012	Mumbai Cutting						
2012	Patang	"Maaru Amdavad"	Ben Horn & Copyflex				
2013	Satyagraha	"Janta Rocks"	Meet Bros	Prasoon Joshi	Meet Bros, Keerthi Sagathia, Shibani Kashyap, Shalmali Kholgade		
2013	Madras Cafe	"Sun Le Re"	Shantanu Moitra	Ali Hayat			
2013	Madras Cafe	"Khud Se"	Shantanu Moitra	Manoj Tapadia			
2013	Madras Cafe	"Sun Le Re" (Reprise Version)	Shantanu Moitra	Ali Hayat			
2013	Chor Chor Super Chor	"Na Ishq Kariyo Jhalle"	Mangesh Dhadke				
2013	Issaq	"Enne Unne"	Sachin–Jigar		Keerthi Sagathia, Mamta Sharma, Tarun Sagar		
2013	Inkaar	"Inkaar – Theme" (Hindi Version)	Shantanu Moitra	Swanand Kirkire	Shahid Mallya		
2013	Special 26	"Kaun Mera" (Male Version)	M. M. Kreem	Irshad Kamil			
2014	Happy Ending	"Khamma Ghani"	Sachin–Jigar		Smita Nair Jain, Vidhi Mehta		
2014	Mumbai Delhi Mumbai	"Thham Sa Gaya"	Sawan Dutta				
2014	Bobby Jasoos	"Tu"	Shantanu Moitra		Shreya Ghoshal		
2014	Bobby Jasoos	"Tu" (Reprise Version)	Shantanu Moitra		Shreya Ghoshal		
2014	Manjunath	"Gol"	Sonam Sherpa, Nitin Malik, Subir Malik of Parikrama				
2014	Kya Dilli Kya Lahore	"Lakeerein"	Sandesh Shandilya				
2014	Lakshmi	"Sun Ri Baavli"	Tapas Relia				
2014	Bhopal: A Prayer for Rain	"Sun Zara"	Papon				
2015	Bajrangi Bhaijaan	"Tu Jo Mila" (Reprise Version)	Pritam				
2015	Hamari Adhuri Kahani	"Humnava"	Mithoon				
2015	Bombay Velvet	"Darbaan"	Amit Trivedi				
2015	Dum Laga Ke Haisha	"Moh Moh Ke Dhaage" (Male Version)	Anu Malik		Bishal Phukan		
2015	Dum Laga Ke Haisha	"Prem's Theme"	Anu Malik		Bishal Phukan		
2015	Hawaizaada	"Turram Khan"	Rochak Kohli	Ayushmann Khurrana, Monali Thakur			
2015	Baby	"Main Tujhse Pyaar Nahin Karta"	M. M. Kreem				
2016	Bollywood Diaries	"Titli"	Vipin Patwa				
2016	Dhanak	"Chal Chalein"	Tapas Relia	Vibha Saraf, Shivam Pathak			
2016	Sultan	"Bulleya"	Vishal–Shekhar				
2016	Hai Apna Dil Toh Awara	"Chhu Liya"	Ajay Singha	Neha Rajpal			
2016	Raaz: Reboot	"Hummein Tummein Jo Tha"	Jeet Gannguli	Palak Muchhal			
2016	Befikre	"Labon Ka Karobaar"	Vishal–Shekhar				
2017	Irada	"Chaand Rajai Odhe"	Neeraj Shridhar				
2017	Tubelight	"Kuch Nahi" (Encore Version)	Pritam				
2017	Mubarakan	"Haathon Mein Thhe Haath"	Gourov Roshin	Aditi Singh Sharma, Arpita Mukherjee, Altamash Faridi			
2017	Babumoshai Bandookbaaz	"Chulbuli"	Gaurav Dagaonkar				
2017	Qarib Qarib Singlle	"Tu Chale Toh"	Rochak Kohli				
2017	Qarib Qarib Singlle	"Daana Paani"	Anu Malik	Anmol Malik, Sabri Brothers			
2018	Raid	"Jhuk Na Paunga"	Amit Trivedi				
2018	Daas Dev	"Raat Din Yunhi"	Sandesh Shandilya	Shradha Mishra			
2018	Daas Dev	"Marne Ka Shauk"	Shamir Tandon	Krishna Beura			
2018	Bhavesh Joshi Superhero	"Qasam Kha Li"	Amit Trivedi				
2018	Sanju	"Baba Bolta Hain Bas Ho Gaya"	Vikram Montrose		Ranbir Kapoor, Supriya Pathak		
2018	Karwaan	"Heartquake"	Anurag Saikia	Akarsh Khurana			
2018	Karwaan	"Heartquake (Aftershocks)"	Anurag Saikia	Akarsh Khurana	SlowCheeta		
2018	Sui Dhaaga	"Chaav Laaga"	Anu Malik	Ronkini Gupta			
2018	Sui Dhaaga	"Khatar Patar"	Anu Malik				
2018	III Smoking Barrels	"Yeh Tishnagi"	Papon				
2018	Ishqeria	"Toofaani Hawa"	Papon				
2018	Ishqeria	"Jeans Pant Aur Choli"	Papon	Kalpana Patowary			
2018	Ishqeria	"Yaadein"	Papon	Kalpana Patowary			
2019	Music Teacher	"Phir Wahi Raat"	Rochak Kohli				
2019	Music Teacher	"Rimjhim Gire Sawan"	Rochak Kohli		Shreya Ghoshal		
2019	Music Teacher	"Ik Mod Male"	Rochak Kohli				
2019	India's Most Wanted	"Vande Mataram"	Amit Trivedi		Altamash Faridi		
2019	Bala	"Zindagi"	Sachin-Jigar	Bhargav Purohit			
2021	83	"Yeh Hausle" (Reprise)	Pritam	Kausar Munir			
2022	Cirkus	"Sun Zara"	Kumaar	Shreya Ghoshal			
2023	Mission Majnu	"Tum Ho"	Arko	A. M. Turaz		Netflix film	
2023	1920: Horrors of the Heart	"Woh Kahani"	Puneeth Dixit	Shweta Bothra			
2024	Merry Christmas	"Nazar Teri"	Pritam	Varun Grover			
2025	Metro... In Dino	"Yaad"	Pritam	Momin Khan Momin		Side A	
2025	Metro... In Dino	"Hote Tak"	Pritam	Ghalib, Sandeep Shrivastava		Side B	
2025	Metro... In Dino	"Das Haasil Sau Baaki (Acapella)"	Pritam	Sandeep Srivastava	Shashwat Singh, Nikhita Gandhi	Side B	
2025	Metro... In Dino	"Mausam (Mood Shift)"	Pritam	Qaisar Ul Jafri, Sandeep Shrivastava		Side B	
2025	Metro... In Dino	"Qaide Se (Film Version)"	Pritam	Amitabh Bhattacharya		Side B	
2025	Jolly LLB 3	"Hua Na"	Anurag Saikia	Puneet Sharma			
2025	Gustaakh Ishq	"Ul Jalool Ishq"	Vishal Bhardwaj	Gulzar	Shilpa Rao		

== Assamese film and drama songs ==
Year	Film/Theatre	Song	Composer(s)	Writer(s)	Co-singer(s)	Ref.
2009	Dhunia Tirutabur	"Xondhya Jetiya Naamey"	Papon			
2011	Raamdhenu	"Ujai A Jaa Noi"	Jatin Sharma			
2011	Raamdhenu	"Raamdhenu"	Jatin Sharma			
2011	Hengool Theatre 2011–12	"Morisika"	Arupjyoti Baruah			
2012	Rowd	"Pokhi Pokhi"	Jatin Sharma		Rupjyoti Devi	
2012	Rowd	"Surujmukhi"	Jatin Sharma			
2013	Bhal Pabo Najanilu	"Xuworoni"	Achurjya Borpatra, Mrinmoi Mritik			
2014	Anuradha	"Boi Juwa"	Geet Priyam			
2014	Rodor Sithi	"Protidine"	Zubeen Garg	Diganta Bharati		
2014	Rodor Sithi	"Endhare" (Encore Version)	Zubeen Garg	Hiren Bhattacharyya		
2015	Khel: The Game	"Tumake Kakhorote Pale"	Poran Borkatoky (Jojo)		Bornali Kalita	
2015	Hengool Theatre 2015–16	"Di Juwa"				
2016	Dooronir Nirola Poja	"Khuje Khuje Jibon"	Tony Basumatary, Utkarsh Dhotekar			
2016	Dooronir Nirola Poja	"Xur Herabo Khuje"	Tony Basumatary, Utkarsh Dhotekar			
2016	Hengool Theatre 2016–17	"Bonoriya"	Papon			
2016	Bahniman	"Kola Kola Endhare"	Jatin Sharma			
2017	Konwarpurar Konwar	"Hahi Eti"	Poran Borkatoky (Jojo)			
2017	Kahinoor Theatre 2017–18	"Mathu Tumi"	Rajdweep			
2017	Nijanor Gaan	"Bohu Aasha"	Jatin Sharma			
2018	Rajmukut Theatre	"Bauli Mur Priya"	Rajdweep			
2018	Ulka	"Ulka"	Ibson Lal Baruah			
2018	III Smoking Barrels	"Uttorbihin"	Papon			
2018	III Smoking Barrels	"Pawe Pari Hari"	Mahapurush Srimanta Sankardev			
2018	Raja Returns	"Eketi Baatere"	Poran Borkatoky (Jojo)			
2019	Rowd Hoi Aha TUmi	"Rowd Hoi Aha Tumi"				
2019	Rowd Hoi Aha TUmi	"Rowd Hoi Aha Tumi (Duet)"	Monjuri Bordoloi			
2019	Nodi Mathu Boi – Song of the River	"Nodi Mathu Boi"				
2020	Goru	"Dhikkar Ei Jibon"	Himanshu Prasad Das	Himanshu Prasad Das		
2020	Rhino Express	"Shamiyana"		Rajdweep	Sushmita	
2025	Roi Roi Binale	"Free Bird"	Zubeen Garg	Zubeen Garg	Joi Barua	

== Bengali film songs ==
Year	Film	Song	Composer(s)	Writer(s)	Co-singer(s)	Ref.
2011	System	"Hente Chenashona Rastay"	Jeet Gannguli			
2014	Buno Haansh	"Esheche Raat"	Shantanu Moitra	Srijato	Shreya Ghoshal	
2014	Kokhon Tomar Asbe Telephone	"Ek Dui Teen"	Dabbu			
2014	Parapaar	"Mukhomukhi"	Sourendra and Soumyojit			
2014	Obhishopto Nighty	"Roddur"	Indraadip Das Gupta	Srijato	Antara Mitra	
2015	Lorai: Play to Live	"Jonaki"	Indraadip Das Gupta			
2015	Arshinagar	"Jaan Jodi Jaaye Jaak"	Debojyoti Mishra		Satadal Chatterjee, Arnab Basu, Chirantan Banerjee, Prasenjit Mallick	
2016	Ki Kore Toke Bolbo	"Ki Kore Bolbo Tomay" (Duet Version)	Jeet Gannguli		Palak Muchhal	
2016	Ki Kore Toke Bolbo	"Ki Kore Bolbo Tomay" (Male Version)	Jeet Gannguli			
2017	Chaya O Chobi	"Chera Drawing Khata"	Indraadip Dasgupta	Kaushik Ganguly		
2017	Yeti Obhijaan	"Jete Hawbe"	Indraadip Dasgupta	Srijit Mukherjee		
2018	Tritiya Adhyay	"Hazar Bochor"	Arin Prosenjit Das	Meghna Mishra		
2021	Prem Tame	"Kacche Thako"	Shantanu Moitra	Anindya Chattopadhyay	Shreya Ghoshal	
2022	Kishmish	"Kanna"	Soumyadeep Subhadeep	Nilayan Chatterjee		
2023	Pradhan	"Hoyechhe Boli Ki Shon"	Shantanu Moitra	Prosen	Shreya Ghosal	

== Other regional film songs ==
Year	Film	Song	Composer(s)	Writer(s)	Co-singer(s)	Ref.
Tamil Film Songs
2013	Vanakkam Chennai	"Hey!"	Anirudh Ravichander	Na. Muthukumar	Maria Roe Vincent	
2015	Valiyavan	"Hello Hello"	D. Imman	Viveka		
2016	Pokkiri Raja	"Bubbly Bubbly"	D. Imman	Viveka	Maria Roe Vincent	
Marathi Film Songs
2014	Vitti Dandu	"Pahuni Ghe Re Saare"	Santosh Mulekar			
2015	Dhinchak Enterprise	"Re Manaa"	Samir Saptiskar			
Kannada Film Songs
2015	Plus	"Sari Tappu Kelada Moha"	B. J. Bharath	Yogaraj Bhat	Ritisha Padmanabha	

== Non-film recordings ==
Year	Album	Song	Language	Composer	Lyricist	Co-artist(s)	Notes	Ref.
1998	Snigdha Junak	"Nasaba Sokule"	Assamese	Zubeen Garg	Zubeen Garg	Zubeen Garg	First song released (debut)	
2004	Jonaki Raati		Assamese				First solo album	
2004	Dhulir Akakh		Assamese				Manjit	
2008	Rong Phool		Assamese				Assamese Folk album	
2009	Sinaki Osinaaki		Assamese				Second solo album	
2010	Gomseng		Assamese			Rashmirekha Saikia	Bihu song album	
2010	Phagunar Gaan		Assamese				Holi song album	
2011	Niyoror Gadhuli		Assamese			Diganta Bharati, Dikshu, Chayanika		
2011	Gaan		Assamese			Zubeen Garg, Zublee		
2011	Phoolseng		Assamese			Rashmirekha Saikia, Eliyana Gogoii, Prasanto Koar, Praveen Saikiya	Bihu song album	
2012	The Story So Far		Hindi				First solo Hindi album	
2013	Akaxor Nilakhini		Assamese			Madhusmita Bhattacharya		
2014	Kirili		Assamese				Bihu song album	
2014	Kun Tumi		Assamese			Zubeen Garg, Mahalaxmi Iyer, Pulak Banerjee, Rupjyoti Devi, Shaswati Phukan		
2015	The Sacred Scriptures of Monikut		Assamese			Kalpana Patowary, Vivek Madan, Zubeen Garg		
2015	Jana Gana Mana The Soul Of India		Hindi			Sonu Nigam, Bickram Ghosh, Kaushiki Chakraborty, Neeti Mohan, Noora Sisters, Pandit Tarun Bhattacharya, Pandit Vishwa Mohan Bhatt, Purbayan Chatterjee, Rashid Khan, Ronu Majumdar, Unnikrishnan	Single	
2016	Mon Doriya		Bangla			Papon & Dola	Mixed Album: Mon Doriya	Iqbal
2016	The Story Now		Hindi				Second solo Hindi album	
2017	Namami Brahmaputra		Hindi			Arijit Singh, Vishal Dadlani, Shreya Ghoshal, Zubeen Garg, Sonu Nigam, Kailash Kher, Shankar Mahadevan, Usha Uthup, Amitabh Bachchan	Theme song of Namami Brahmaputra Festival	
2017	Notun Puhor		Assamese				Third solo Assamese album	
2018	Mujhe Kaise Pata Na Chala		Hindi				Single	
2019	Laute Nahi song from Broken But Beautiful		Hindi			Single	Lyrics: Yash Narvekar	
2019	Rasta Jahaan Le Chale from TVF Tripling: Season 2		Hindi			Single	Music: Nilotpal Bora	
2019	Waise Hi Rehna, Waise Hi Rehna from Express Yourself MX Player		Hindi			Single	Lyrics: Vaibhav Modi	
2019	Har Lamha (Indie Music Label)		Hindi			Single	Music: Raaj Aashoo	
2019	Aajo Cholechi (Oriplast Originals)		Hindi			Shalmali Kholgade	Music: Subhadeep Mitra	
2019	Zaroori Hai Kya Ishq Mein - Band Mix		Hindi		Kumaar	Single	Music: Meet Bros	
2019	Aamiu Gao Gaan	Gaantu Je Gaai Asila	Assamese					
2020		Dhokhadhari	Hindi	Gaurav Chatterji	Ginny Diwan	Manon Gingold		
2020		Subah Ki Garmi from It Happened In Calcutta	Hindi	Darshan Umang	Siddhant Kaushal	----		
2020		Par Hobo Aei Xomoi	Assamese	Papon	Papon	----		
2020		Teri Photo from Who's your Daddy	Hindi	Zahaan Khan	Ashish Bhat	Akriti Kakkar		
2020		Haaye Rabba	Hindi	Siddharth Amit Bhavsar	Siddharth Amit Bhavsar	----		
2020		Sajda Karoon (Times Of Music Anthem)	Hindi	Papon	Vaibhav Modi	Various		
2020		Siyaahi	Hindi	Shashaa Tirupati	Shashaa Tirupati	Shashaa Tirupati		
2020		Nilaanjana	Assamese	Papon	Jananjoy Saikia	----		
2020		Nirobota Dao Gaan	Bengali		Robi Thakur, Rtam Sen	----		
2020		Tomar Kotha	Assamese	Keshab Nayan	Keshab Nayan	----		
2020		Mujhe Kisi Se Pyaar Nahi	Hindi	Deepak Pandit	Manoj Muntashir	----		
2020		Khidki	Hindi	Amarabha Banerjee	Amarabha Banerjee	----		
2020		Jiyo Mhaaro Sa (MTV Sound Trippin’)	Hindi	Ankur Tewari	Ankur Tewari	Kasam Khan		
2020		Maula	Hindi		Goldie Sohel	----		
2021		Hridoye Tomar Thikana	Bangla	Adit Rahman	Robiul Islam Jibon	Tamanna Prome		
2021		Main Aaj Bhi Wahin	Hindi	Papon	Papon	----		
2021		Xobdo Bohu Dinor	Assamese	Papon	Papon	----		
2021		Uduli Muduli	Assamese	Zublee Baruah	Rajdweep	----		
2022	Single	Koi Nidia Kio	Assamese	Manash Hazarika	Keshab Nayan	Shreya Ghosal		
2022	Single	Paatigonit	Assamese	Rahul Gautam Sharma	Rahul Gautam Sharma			
2026	Single	Aakou Jen Tumi Aahi	Assamese, English	Ashihsh Painoli	Ashish Painoli	Suchitra Pillai		

== Television performances ==
Show	Season	Song(s)	Co-artist(s)	Notes	Ref.
The Dewarists	Season 1, 2011	Khule Da Rabb	Rabbi Shergill		
The Dewarists	Season 2, 2012	The Minstrel's Tale	Karsh Kale, Carl Barat		
The Dewarists	Season 4, 2015	O Megh	Shantanu Moitra		
The Dewarists	Season 5, 2016	Memories	Nucleya		
MTV Roadies	Season 10, 2013	Jajabor	Raghu Ram	Theme song for the show	
Coke Studio	Season 1, 2011	Pak Pak (Bihu Naam)			
Coke Studio	Season 1, 2011	Tere Naam	Kailash Kher, Chinna Ponnu, Sanjeev Thomas, Shruti Pathak, Lesle Lewis		
Coke Studio	Season 2, 2012	Saahil Tak	Samidha Joglekar		
Coke Studio	Season 2, 2012	Tokari	Sugandha Garg		
Coke Studio	Season 3, 2013	Dinae Dinae	Harshdeep Kaur	Papon produced this episode	
Coke Studio	Season 3, 2013	Baisara Beera	Kalpana Patowary	Papon produced this episode	
Coke Studio	Season 3, 2013	Khumaar		Papon produced this episode	
Coke Studio	Season 3, 2013	Jhumoor	Dulal Manki, Simanta Shekhar	Papon produced this episode	
Coke Studio	Season 3, 2013	Benaam Khwaayishein	Anweshaa	Papon produced this episode	
Coke Studio	Season 3, 2013	Tauba	Benny Dayal	Papon produced this episode	
MTV Unplugged	Season 4, 2014	Baarish Ki Boondein		Episode aired on 6 December 2014 features Papon	
MTV Unplugged	Season 4, 2014	Ranjish He Sahi		Episode aired on 6 December 2014 features Papon	
MTV Unplugged	Season 4, 2014	Yeh Mojeza		Episode aired on 6 December 2014 features Papon	
MTV Unplugged	Season 4, 2014	Boitha Maro		Episode aired on 6 December 2014 features Papon	
MTV Unplugged	Season 4, 2014	Kaun Mera		Episode aired on 6 December 2014 features Papon	
MTV Unplugged	Season 4, 2014	Kyun		Episode aired on 6 December 2014 features Papon	
MTV Unplugged	Season 4, 2014	Jiyein Kyun		Episode aired on 6 December 2014 features Papon	
Wind of Change (Bangladesh)	Season 5, 2019	Aaj Ei Bristir Kanna Dekhey		Kaushik Hossain Taposh	
Wind of Change (Bangladesh)	Season 5, 2019	Orey Neel Doriya		Kaushik Hossain Taposh	
Wind of Change (Bangladesh)	Season 6, 2020	Nisha Lagilo Re	Tashfee		

Albums
The Story So Far	Baavle Jharne	Year of Release
The Story So Far	Baarish Ki Boondein	2012
The Story So Far	Choti Choti Baatein	2012
The Story So Far	Main Toh Chalta He Raha	2012
The Story So Far	Keep Rolling	2012
The Story So Far	Durr	2012
The Story So Far	Kyo Hota Hai Pyaar	2012
The Story So Far	Din Guzrein Who	2012
The Story So Far	Aankhee	2012
The Story Now	Sahil Sahil	2016
The Story Now	Kahi Na Kahi	2016
The Story Now	Loving A Dream	2016
The Last Monk	The Last Monk (Music for the movie)	2006
Ishqeria	Pant Aur Choli	2014
Ishqeria	Toofani Hawa	2014
Ishqeria	Yaadein	2014
