= Dara Ahmed =

Indian film director (1946–2021)

- Born: June 10, 1946; Nazira, Sivasagar, Assam
- Died: May 24, 2021 (aged 74)
- Occupation: Film Director
- Relatives: Eli Ahmed

Dara Ahmed (Assamese:দাৰা আহমেদ) was an Indian film director known for films like Rickshawala, Jakhini, Bordoisila and Pooja. He entered the Assamese Film industry as an assistant director in the film Dr Bazbarua. He died on 24 May 2021, at the age of 72 in Guwahati.

== Early life ==
He was born in Nazira, Sivasagar on 10 June 1946. His father A. Rashid was a doctor and his sister Eli Ahmed is a Padma shri winning writer.

== Filmography ==
Title	Year	Role
Dr Bezbarua	1969	Assistant Director
Chameli Memsaab	1975	Assistant Director
Devi	1984	Co Director
Pooja	1985	Director
Madhuchanda	1986	Director
Pratidan	1987	Director
Bordoisila	1989	Director
Dhrubatora	1990	Director
Jakhini	1991	Director
Rickshawala	1993	Director
Urvashi	1995	Director
Devota	1998	Director
