= Pranami Bora =

Indian film actress

- Born: Assam, India
- Occupation: Actress
- Years active: 2013–present

Pranami Bora is an Indian actress who works in the Assamese film industry.

== Career ==
Pranami Bora began her career in acting with a role in Lijin Boss's short film Conditions Apply released in 2010.

== Filmography ==
Year	Film	Director	Notes
2010	Conditions Apply	Lijin Bose	Short film
2013	Shinyor	Kankan Rajkhowa	Won the best supporting role in Prag Cine Awards 2014
2014	Adomya	Bobby Sarma Baruah	
2014	Jeeya Jurir Xubax	Sanjib Sabhapandit	
2015	Anuradha	Rakesh Sharma	
2016	Doordarshan Eti Jantra	Rajesh Bhuyan	
2016	Marksheet	Ratan Sil Sarma	
2017	Shakira Ahibo Bokultolor Bihuloi	Himanshu Prasad Dad	
2017	Antareen	Manjul Baruah	
2017	Chaaknoiya	Naba Kumar Nath	
2017	Sonar Baran Pakhi	Bobby Sarma Baruah	Debut in lead role
2017	Maj Rati Keteki	Santwana Bordoloi	
2020	God on the Balcony	Biswajeet Bora	Charactered as Numali

== Awards and nominations ==
Year	Award	Category	Film	Result
2014	Prag Cine Awards	Best Supporting Role Female	Shinyor	Won
2017	Prag Cine Awards	Best Supporting Role Female	Doordarshan Eti Jantra and Maj Rati Keteki	Won
