= Biju Phukan =

Indian actor (1947 - 2017)

- Born: 18 February 1947; Dibrugarh, Assam
- Died: 22 November 2017 (aged 70); Apollo Hospital, Guwahati, India
- Occupation: Actor
- Years active: 1970–2017
- Spouse: Rajashri Phukan
- Children: Sanghamitra Phukan, Angshuman Phukan

Biju Phukan (18 February 1947 – 22 November 2017) was an Assamese actor. He was born in Dibrugarh, India, where he studied in the Dibrugarh HS Kanoi College and Dibrugarh Govt. Boys' Higher Secondary School. He appeared in more than eighty Assamese feature films. His first movie was Dr. Bezbarua (1970).

His first role as leading actor was in Baruar Songshar followed by Aranya which established him as a 'hero'. One of his songs that attained fame and was successful in the charts was "Mon Hira Doi" from the film Bowari. His first release as a hero was Samarendra Narayan Dev's Aranya in 1971, which was adjudged the Best Regional Film at the National Film Awards.

He was residing in Guwahati. He was a former jury member of Indian Panorama. He died at Apollo Hospital in Guwahati on 22 November 2017, aged 70.

== Filmography ==
Year	Film	Director
1970	Dr. Bezbaruah	Brajen Barua
1970	Baruar Songshar	Nip Baruah
1971	Aranya	Samarendra Narayan Dev
1972	Opaja Xonar Mati	Brajen Barua
1972	Lalita	Brajen Barua
1972	Upagragh	Bhaben Das
1973	Bonoriya Phool	Atul Bordoloi
1973	Anutap	Atul Bordoloi
1973	Rashmirekha	Prafulla Baruah
1973	Momota	Nalin Duwarah
1973	Ganesh	AK Films Unit
1974	Brishti	Deuti Baruah
1977	Dharmakai	Bhaben Das
1977	Natun Asha	Prabir Mitra
1978	Morom	Dibwon Barua
1979	Bisesh Eraati	Dr Upen Kakoti
1979	Meghmukti	Bandhu
1979	Srimoti Mahimamayee	Pulak Gogoi
1979	Dujonir Rong	Jones Mahalia
1980	Ajoli Nabou	Nip Baruah
1980	Upapath	Hemanta Dutta
1980	Akon	Gauri Barman
1981	Rajani Gandha	Prafulla Baruah
1981	Manashi	Balai Sen
1982	Bowari	Sivaprasad Thakur
1982	Raja	Samarendra Narayan Dev
1982	Aparoopa	Jahnu Barua
1983	Ghar Sangsar	Sivaprasad Thakur
1984	Devi	Sambhu Gupta and Dara Ahmed
1985	Agnisnaan	Dr Bhabendra Nath Saikia
1985	Bohagor Duporiya	Johns Moholia
1985	Mon Mandir	Sivaprasad Thakur
1986	Anthony Mur Naam	Nip Baruah
1986	Mayuri	Siva Prasad Thakur
1986	Maa	Bhaben Das
1986	Papori	Jahnu Barua
1986	Ei Desh Mur Desh	Siva Prasad Thakur
1987	Jetuki	Chandra Talukdar
1988	Pita-Putra	Munin Barua
1989	Bhai-Bhai	Biju Phukan
1990	Abhiman	Mridul Gupta
1990	Pahari Kanya	Munin Barua
1991	RangaNodi	Brajen Borah
1991	Jakhini	Dara Ahmed
1994	Ashanto Prohor	Sivaprasad Thakur
1995	I Killed Him Sir	Pradip Gogoi
1995	Itihas	Dr Bhabendra Nath Saikia
1998	Krishnachura	Mridul Gupta
2000	Aasene Konoba Hiyaat	Baharul Islam
2001	Ei Morom Tumar Babe	Taufiq Rahman
2002	Iman Morom Kio Lage	Alok Nath
2003	Agnisakshi	Jadumani Dutta
2003	Priya Milon	Munna Ahmed
2003	Hepaah	Shankar Borua
2004	Maa Tumi Ananya	Munna Ahmed
2004	Barood	Munin Barua
2004	Rong	Munin Barua
2006	Deuta Diya Bidaay	Ramesh Modi
2006	Snehabandhan	Debojit Majumdar
2010	Ochin Chinaki	Munna Ahmed
2012	Rowd	Gautam Baruah
2015	Khandob Daah (Grief On A Sunday Morning)	Shankar Borua
2016	Dur	Kangkan Rajkhowa
2018	The Underworld	Rajesh Jashpal

== Drama ==
- Samay, written by Natyasamrat Prafulla Bora
- Neta, written by Natyasamrat Prafulla Bora
- Captain Gogoi
- Falgo
- Haiya Dhuwai Nile

== Bengali movies ==
- Hotel Snow Fox (1976)
- Aparajita (1976)
- Doishyu Ratnakar
- Gajamukta (1994)
