= Renu Saikia =

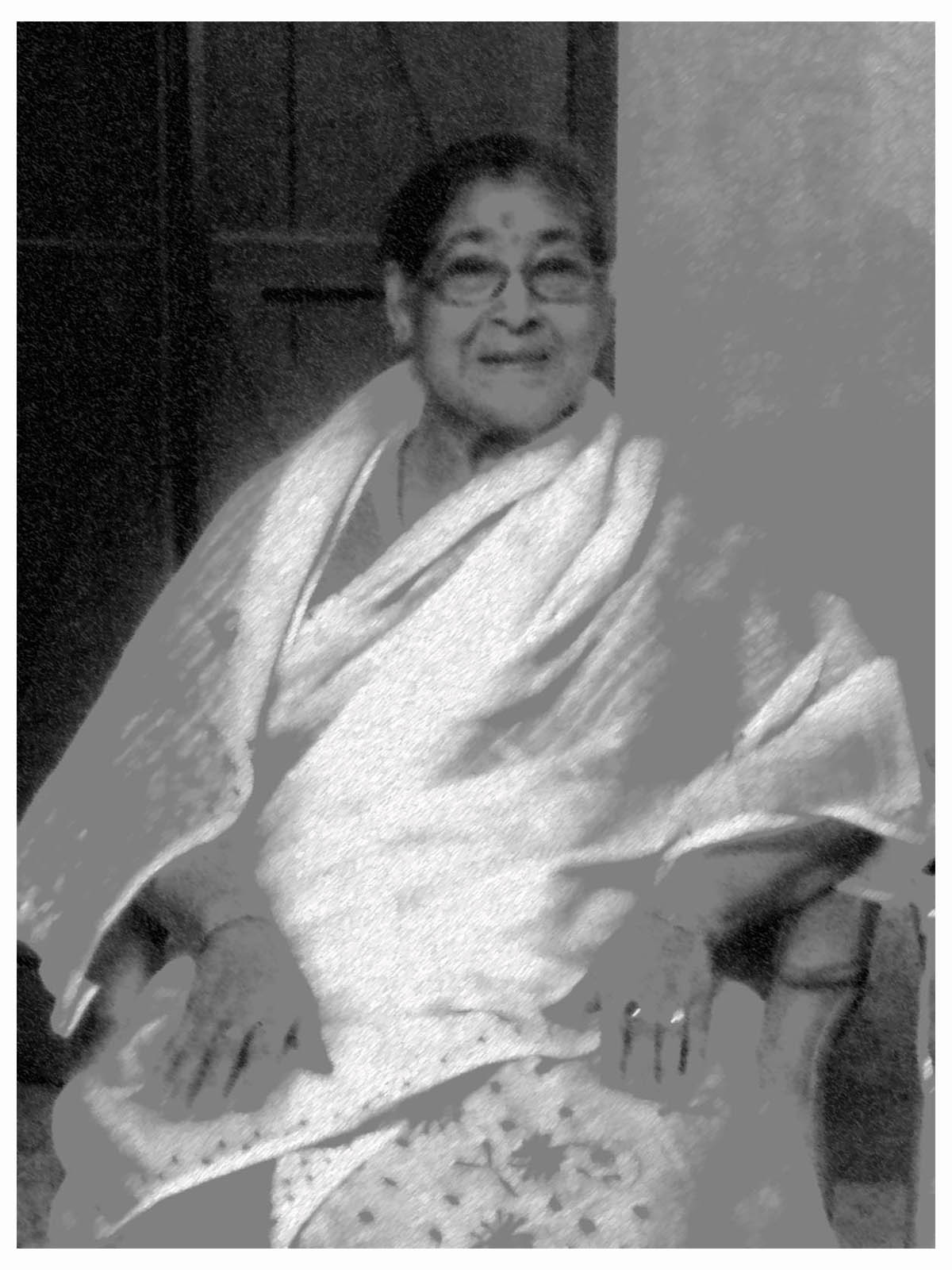
- Born: Renu Borbora; 10 December 1934; Sripuria, Tinsukia, Assam
- Died: 17 November 2011 (aged 76); Borpothar, Tinsukia, Assam, India

Renu Saikia (10 December 1934 – 17 November 2011) was a prolific actress in the Assamese film industry, who later became famous as character actress, appearing in three well renowned films bringing a new change to Assamese cinema and theatre, where she appeared in hits like Maniram Dewan (1963), made by Harbeshwar Chakraborty, Dr. Bezbaruah (1968), made by Brojen Baruah and Ratanlal (1970s). Her other memorable roles were in some well-known stage plays, Kalyani, Joymoti, Nimila Angko, Taxi Driver and Rajpath - one of the most famous drama-act, which made her way towards the Assamese cinema.

== Biography ==
She was born on 10 December 1934 into a well-known family in Sripuria, Tinsukia, Assam. Her parents were Komol Borbora (an executive officer from Indian Oil Corporation Limited, Digboi) and Puniyaprova Borbora. Her father later left his job due to official issues (a long strike in the company). She had ten siblings, one of them the late Golap Borbora, was a Member of Parliament and Chief Minister of Assam (1978). She began her acting career at age 18 in the stage play, Joymoti (1952), and went on to play lead roles. Rajpath (1961) was her career turning point theatre to the Assamese film industry. She acted in a Hindi play directed by Humeshwar Barua and a Bengali play, Nicher Mohol. She was noted as "Lalita Pawar" of Assamese cinema, after her role in Dr. Bezbaruah.

== Personal life ==
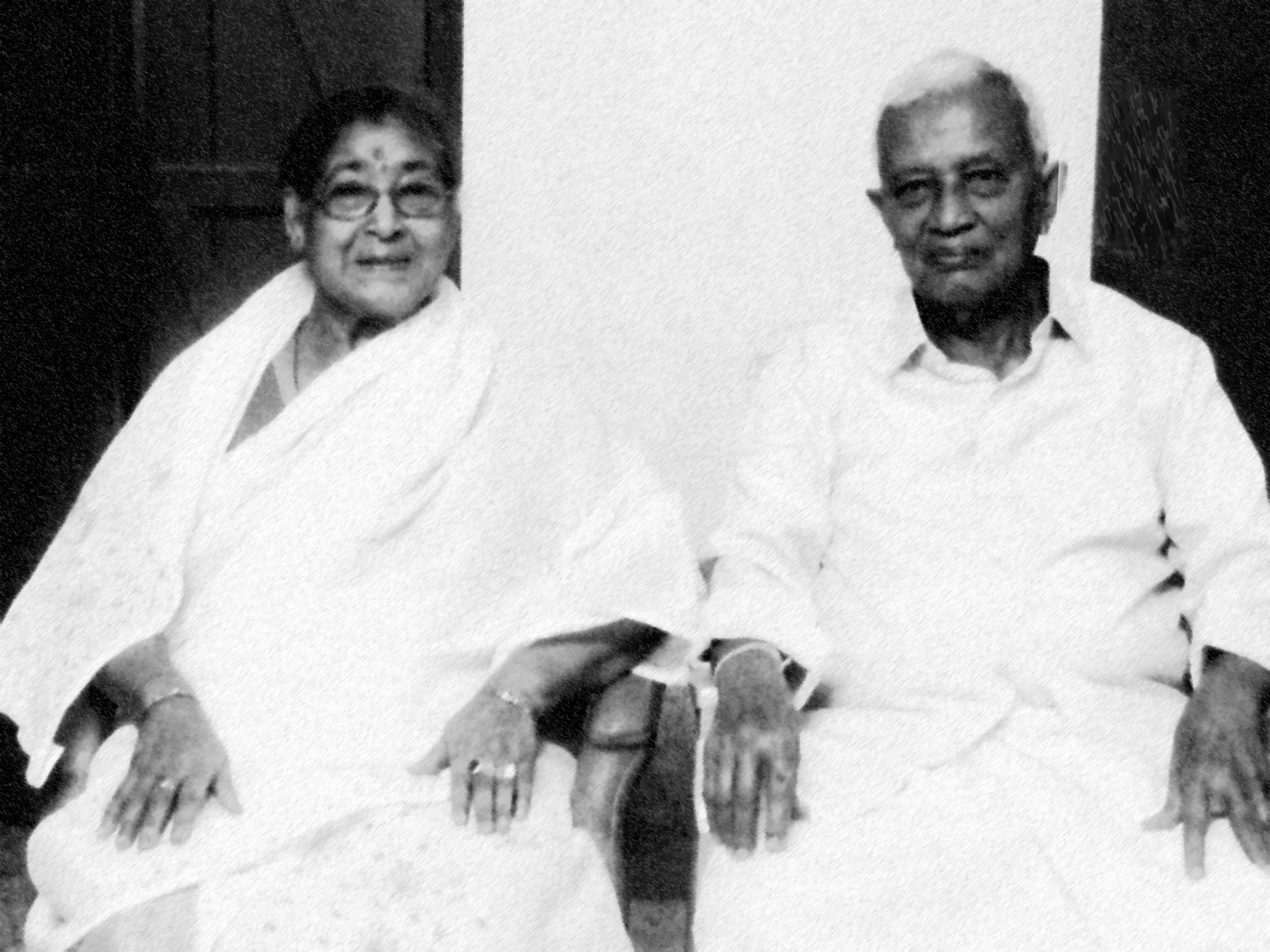
Renu Saikia and Samaren Saikia

Borbora was married in 1956 to Samaren Saikia, the actor, writer and director/creator of Eti Brahmon Ekhon Ronga Prithibit, Meghmukti and Hukula Hatir Xopun and translator of Amar Vietnam. They had previously worked together in many stage plays. She had with him one son and two daughters. After her marriage, she worked for her husband's famous Assamese play Rajpath as a contribution towards Assam's Biggest Drama/Play Festival held in Guwahati, organized by the Government of Assam. In 1962, on the day her youngest child was born, she signed the contract for her first film, Maniram Dewan. She acted the famous song "Buku Hum Hum Kare" (sang by the late Dr. Bhupen Hazarikia). She suffered from many illnesses in her last few years and was finally bedridden in September 2011. She died on 17 November 2011 in Tinsukia, Assam, where she had been staying along with her family.

== Filmography ==
Year	Film	Character
1963	Maniram Dewan	Raj Mao
1968	Dr. Bezbaruah	Wife of a rich tea garden owner and step-mother of lead actor Nipon Goswami
1970s	Ratanlal	Wife of tea garden labour's head
