= Paglee =

Paglee পাগলী
- Directed by: Rupjyoti Borah
- Screenplay by: Rupjyoti Borah
- Produced by: Bisheswer Dutta; Nip Konwar; Prema Dutta
- Starring: Nayan Nirban Baruah; Prastuti Parashar
- Cinematography: Suman Duwara
- Edited by: Ashim Sharma
- Music by: Arup Dutta
- Production company: Rimzim Films
- Distributed by: Rimzim Films
- Release date: 4 November 2016
- Country: India
- Language: Assamese

Paglee (English: Mental) is an Assamese language romantic action film directed by Rupjyoti Borah. This film features Nayan Nirban Baruah and Prastuti Parashar in lead role. It was produced and distributed by Rimzim Films.

== Cast ==
- Prastuti Parashar as Karbi
- Nayan Nirban Baruah as Raja
- Arun Hazarika
- Siddhartha Kalita
- Ramen Tamuli

== Soundtrack ==
The movie has three songs sung by Zubeen Garg, Priyanka Bharali and Subasana Dutta.

Paglee

Soundtrack album by Arup Dutta and Anupam Saikia
- Released: 2016
- Recorded: 2016
- Genre: Feature film Soundtrack
- Length: 13:34
- Language: Assamese
- Label: Rimzim Films
- Producer: Bisheswar Dutta; Nip Konwar

No.	Title	Singer (s)	Length
1.	"Tumar Hiyat"	Zubeen Garg, Subasana Dutta	5:54
2.	"Lajuki Lajuki Khujote"	Zubeen Garg, Priyanka Baharali	3:25
3.	"Paglee Moi (Title Track)"	Priyanka Bharali	4:15
