= Gajamukta =

1994 film

Gajamukta is a 1994 Bengali adventure drama film directed by Ajit Lahiri and produced by Dilip Sur based on a same name novel of Narayan Sanyal published in 1961. This is the debut film of Riya Sen in Bengali film as a child artist. Music of the movie was scored by Bhupen Hazarika.

== Plot ==
This is the story of hunting an elephant for a yearly ritual in Assam. This is actually a game of death.

== Cast ==
- Soumitra Chatterjee
- Tom Alter
- Gyanesh Mukherjee
- Basabi Nandi
- Moon Moon Sen
- Abhishek Chatterjee
- Riya Sen
- Biju Phukan
- Ratna Das
- Noni Ganguly
- Subrata Sensharma
