= Brindabon Theatre =

Mobile theatre group of the North-Eastern Indian state of Assam

Brindaban Theatre
- Promotional image of 2015-2016 Brindaban Theatre.
- Address: Guwahati, Assam; India
- Owner: Ganesh Rai Medhi

Construction
- Opened: 2011

Website
- http://www.BrindabanTheatre.TK

The Brindaban Theatre is a mobile theatre group of the North-Eastern Indian state of Assam, founded by Ganesh Rai Medhi in 2011.

== List of Plays ==
Season	Play	Playwright	Starring
2011-12	Bodnaam	Champak Sarma	Champak Sarma, Rajkumar, olympica etc.
2011-12	Mon Toi Pagal Kiyo	Abhijeet Bhattacharya	Champak Sarma, Rajkumar, olympica etc.
2011-12	Bikh Aru Amrit	Munin Baruah	Champak Sarma, Rajkumar, olympica etc.
2012-13	Jabab	Champak Sarma	Prasenjit, Munmi Phukan, Champak Sarmah etc.
2012-13	Anjwali	Abhijeet Bhattacharya	Prasenjit, Munmi Phukan, Champak Sarmah etc.
2012-13	Nach Mayuri Nach	Abhijeet Bhattacharya	Prasenjit, Munmi Phukan, Champak Sarmah etc.
2013-14	Moromor Xuruj	Abhijeet Bhattacharya	Utpal Das, Swagata, Mridul Bhuyan, Chinmoy kotoki etc.
2013-14	Smakhan Jatra	Abhijeet Bhattacharya	Utpal Das, Swagata, Mridul Bhuyan, Chinmoy kotoki etc.
2013-14	Devdas	Sarat Chandra Chattopadhyay	Utpal Das, Swagata, Mridul Bhuyan, Chinmoy kotoki etc.
2014-15	Anamikar Sapun	Abhijeet Bhattacharya	Jatin Bora, Momi Deka, Kamal Riwaati etc.
2014-15	Maa Kasam	Abhijeet Bhattacharya	Jatin Bora, Momi Deka, Kamal Riwaati etc.
2014-15	Bowari	Abhijeet Bhattacharya	Jatin Bora, Momi Deka, Kamal Riwaati etc.
2015-16	Mukti Joddhar Preyoshi	Abhijeet Bhattacharya	Mridul Bhuyan, Parag Sarma, Moonmi Phukan etc.
2015-16	Raam Lila	Abhijeet Bhattacharya	Mridul Bhuyan, Parag Sarma, Moonmi Phukan etc.
2015-16	Titanic	Abhijeet Bhattacharya	Mridul Bhuyan, Parag Sarma, Moonmi Phukan etc.
