= Jeeya Jurir Xubax =

- Directed by: Sanjib Sabhapandit
- Screenplay by: Sanjib Sabhapandit
- Story by: Sanjib Sabhapandit
- Produced by: Utpal Kumar Das
- Starring: Victor Banerjee; Bishnu Kharghoria; Dibyajyoti Das; Pranami Bora; Kalpana Kalita
- Cinematography: Parashar Barua
- Edited by: Saurav Dutta
- Music by: Aniruddha Barua
- Production company: Canvascope
- Release date: 13 March 2014
- Country: India
- Language: Assamese

Jeeya Jurir Xubax (English: The Pulsating Mindscape, lit. "Fragrance of an alive brook") is a 2014 Assamese language drama film written and directed by Sanjib Sabhapandit. It was produced by Utpal Kumar Das and features ensemble cast, including Victor Banerjee and Bishnu Kharghoria. The film was released at mobile cinema on 13 March 2014.

== Plot ==
In a remote riverside a plaque was accidentally discovered from a burial. It reveals that something had happened to this person at the hands of the British. The people assumed he was a freedom fighter, hence a martyr and proper recognition should be given to him. The government declared to erect a statue in honour of the great martyr as an attempt to gain political advantage. But there was no reference, not even a photograph which can form the basis of the statue. The children of the martyr's family try to figure out their ancestor's face by looking through the hereditary characteristics that are passed onto genetically. They examine the faces of different generations to discover similarity and commonality to create the 'probable' person. But gradually they realized that a real man is found not in his appearance but in his works, so they try to discover and evaluate his deeds.

Meanwhile, the older people are busy in digging out orthodox caste matters, the youths are busy more in the celebration aspects and the government is busy in trying to score political issues. At last, the children thought that they have found the real man and give shape to their understanding in the form of a play, through which people get a look into the past of a person, of the village, of the times.

== Cast ==
- Victor Banerjee as Dhon
- Bishnu Kharghoria as Kon
- Pranami Bora
- Kalpana Kalita
- Dibyajyoti Das
- Indra Bania
- Pranjal Saikia
- Anup Hazarika
- Angoorlata

- Atul Pachoni
- Himangshu Das
- Ashimkrishna Barua
- Rajiv Kro
- Biren Hazarika
- Jyoti Narayan Nath
- Sagarika
- Aaswash Mahanta
- Arunav

== Release ==
Jeeya Jurir Xubax was premiered and released on 13 March 2014 at DiGi Films, a mobile cinema theater by NK Productions. At that time the venue of screening was the playground of Gopal Boro Higher Secondary School in Ganeshguri, Guwahati.

== Production ==
Sanjib Sabhapandit, who earlier won Best Film Award on Environment Conservation/Preservation in 51st National Film Awards for Juye Poora Xoon, has directed the film. In an interview with The Hindu, he reveals the idea behind the film. Assam’s contribution to the Indian freedom movement is usually ignored, deliberately sidelined, which influenced him to make this film.
