= Doordarshan Eti Jantra =

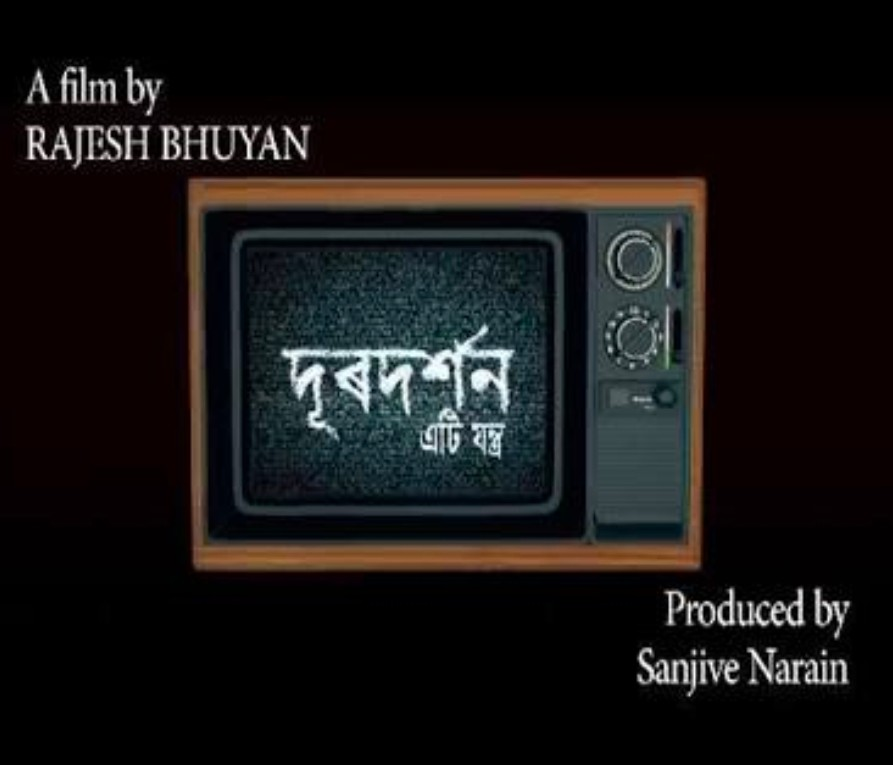
- Theatrical release poster
- Directed by: Rajesh Bhuyan
- Screenplay by: Rajesh Bhuyan; Santanu Rowmuria
- Story by: Himanshu Prasad Das
- Based on: Ekhon Gaonot Eta TV Asil (Drama) by Himanshu Prasad Das
- Produced by: Sanjive Narain
- Starring: Jatin Bora; Utpal Das; Prastuti Porasor; Moonmi Phukan
- Edited by: Gagan Raj
- Music by: Mousum Gogoi
- Production company: AM Television
- Distributed by: AM Television
- Release date: 2 September 2016
- Running time: 150 minutes
- Country: India
- Language: Assamese
- Box office: 1.2 crore

Doordarshan Eti Jantra (English: Television a Machine) is a 2016 Indian Assamese language period comedy drama film directed by Rajesh Bhuyan and produced by Sanjiv Narain under the banner of AM Television. The story is based on National School of Drama's alumnus Himanshu Prasad Das's play Ekhon Gaonot Eta TV Asil. Director Rajesh Bhuyan is also the co screenplay writer along with Santanu Rowmuria. The original playwright Himanshu Prasad Das, and Santanu Rowmuria wrote the dialogues of the film. The film stars many of the renowned actors of Assamese film industry including Jatin Bora, Utpal Das, Prastuti Porasor and Moonmi Phukan in lead role. Released on 2 September 2016 in almost 50 theaters in Assam and Meghalaya (Shillong), the film has already become a superhit in Assam. It is the 12th highest grossing Assamese film.

== Plot ==
A story that dates back to the '80s. An unusual machine makes an entry into a village. It is called TV. It provokes a huge ruckus with people from all over scrambling to have a look at this black and white TV stationed at the most wealthiest of village households.

A group of enthusiastic villagers getting together to dug a hole beside the house, setting up a bamboo pole where an antenna is mounted on top of it, the mechanic turning the antenna back and forth, the visuals coming out right occasionally but most times it looks as though there is a blizzard going on, with people of all shapes and sizes assembling on the floor – these are but some of the cherished moments that naturally unfolded when TV made its debut in this village.

== Cast ==
- Jatin Bora as Kailash
- Prastuti Porasor as Purnima
- Utpal Das as Bitul
- Moonmi Phukan as Selima
- Moitryee Goswami as Malati
- Saurabh Hazarika as Malati's husband
- Chetana Das as Kailash's neighbor (Guest appearance )
- Siddhartha Sharma as Bitul's uncle (police officer)
- Prosenjit Bora
- Pranami Bora
- Alokjyoti Saikia
- Himanshu Prasad Das
- Lakhi Borthakur
- Rajib Kro
- Bijit Dev Chowdhury
- Manmath Barua
- Tridiv Lahon

== Reception ==
=== Rating ===
Critics	Rating
Bookmyshow	8.9/10
FILMIPOP	1/5 stars

== Soundtrack ==
Doordarshan Eti Jantra

Soundtrack album by Mousam Gogoi
- Released: 2016
- Recorded: 2016
- Genre: Feature film soundtrack
- Language: Assamese
- Label: AM Television
- Producer: Sanjiv Narain

The music of the movie is composed by Mousam Gogoi.

No.	Title	Music	artist(s)	Length
1.	"Gulopia Dugal"	Mousam Gogoi	Zubeen Garg, Priyanka Bharali	3:11
2.	"Sai Sai Tumale Mur"	Mousam Gogoi	Zubeen Garg, Chayanika Dutta	4:40

== World Television Premier ==
The film had its world television premiere on Prag News on 16 April 2017 at 12:30 PM IST.

== Awards ==
Year	Awards	Category	Receiver	Result
2017	Prag Cine Awards	Best Popular Film		Won
2017	Prag Cine Awards	Best Actor Male	Jatin Bora	Nominated
2017	Prag Cine Awards	Best Actor Female	Prastuti Parashar	Nominated
2017	Prag Cine Awards	Best Actor Female in Supporting Role	Pranami Bora	Nominated
2017	Prag Cine Awards	Best Editing	Gagan Raj	Nominated
