= Ansula Afa =

- Directed by: Rabi Narzary
- Starring: Rabi Narzary; Esha Basumatary; Dwimu Rani Basumatary
- Release date: 25 June 2016
- Running time: 142 minutes
- Country: India
- Language: Bodo

Ansula Afa (English: The Kind Father) is a 2016 Bodo Social drama film directed by Rabi Narzary, who also starred in the film. The film was released on 25 June 2016. Its produced by director himself under the banner of R. N. Film Presents. The film stars Esha Basumatary, Rabi Narzary and Dwimu Rani Basumatary in the lead roles. The film was nominated for Best Film other than Assamese at the Prag Cine Awards North-East 2017.

== About ==
The film story is about two differences religion between Bathou and Christian.

== Cast ==
- Esha Basumatary as Alari
- Rabi Narzary as Swdwn, Mongal
- Dwimu Rani Basumatary as Priskela

== Soundtrack ==
The music of the film is scored by Amar Boro. The songs were sung by Phungja Mushahary, Esha Basumatary and Jiten Basumatary.

Tracklist of Ansula Afa
No.	Title	Artist(s)	Length
1.	"Thainwi Megon"	Jiten Basumatary	5:37
2.	"Nwngni Bikhani"	Esha Basumatary, Phungja Mushahary	4:41
3.	"Bese Gwdwi Bese Rwisumwi"	Esha Basumatary	4:48
4.	"Swrjigiri Obonglao Nuatari"	Phungja Mushahary	3:47
Total length:			19:43

== See also ==
- Bodo films
