= Tumi Mor Matho Mor =

Tumi Mor Mathu Mor
- Directed by: Zubeen Garg
- Written by: Zubeen Garg
- Screenplay by: Zubeen Garg; Amulya Kakati; Pabitra Margherita
- Produced by: Debo Borkotoky
- Starring: Zubeen Garg; Jatin Bora; Zerifa Wahid; Prastuti Porasor
- Edited by: A. Sreekar Prasad
- Music by: Zubeen Garg
- Release date: 25 February 2000
- Running time: 165 min
- Country: India
- Language: Assamese

Tumi Mor Mathu Mor is a 2000 Indian Assamese romantic-drama film directed by Zubeen Garg in his directorial debut and produced by Debo Borkotoky. It was released on 25 February 2000 coincided with Hiya Diya Niya, also starting Jatin Bora.

== Cast ==
- Zubeen Garg as Rishiraj Baruah
- Zerifa Wahid as Paahi Baruah
- Prastuti Porasor as Tina
- Jatin Bora as Raja
- Nipon Goswami as Paahi's father
- Mridula Baruah as Rishiraj's mother
- Chetana Das
- Hiranya Deka as Professor
- Jonkie Borthakur
- Pabitra Margherita as Arunabh
- Rajesh Bhuyan

== Soundtrack ==
Tumi Mor Mathu Mor

Soundtrack album by Zubeen Garg
- Released: 25 October 1999 (Audio Cassette); January 2000 (Audio CD)
- Recorded: 1999
- Genres: Feature film soundtrack, Pop
- Length: 41:43 (Audio Cassette); 44:43 (Audio CD)
- Language: Assamese
- Label: NK Production
- Producer: Zubeen Garg

Zubeen Garg chronology
Hiya Diya Niya (1999)	Tumi Mor Mathu Mor (1999)	Daag (2000)

The music soundtrack of Tumi Mur Mathu Mur was composed and penned by Zubeen Garg in his first film as a music director along with his another film Hiya Diya Niya. It became one of the first Assamese soundtrack album to be released in Audio CD format. The vocals were performed by Zubeen Garg, Jonkie Borthakur, Sagarika, Shanta Uzir and Luna Sonowal. The album contains 10 tracks included one bonus track and one hidden track.

Tracklist
No.	Title	Artist(s)	Length
1.	"Puhorore Saki"	Zubeen Garg, Luna Sonowal	5:11
2.	"Aetia Hiya Mur"	Zubeen Garg	5:32
3.	"Kije Pale Tumak"	Zubeen Garg, Jonkie Borthakur	5:08
4.	"Kune Ringiyai"	Zubeen Garg	4:24
5.	"Soku Meli Sawte"	Zubeen Garg	4:06
6.	"Mayabi Ei Raati"	Zubeen Garg, Sagarika	6:28
7.	"Gun Gun"	Zubeen Garg, Shanta Uzir	6:27
8.	"Rod Aaji"	Zubeen Garg	5:07
9.	"Tumi Mur Mathu Mur" (Title Song)	Zubeen Garg	2:00
10.	"Untitled Song" (Hidden Track)	Zubeen Garg	1:00
