= Eli Ahmed =

Indian writer, scriptwriter, director, lyricist, costume designer

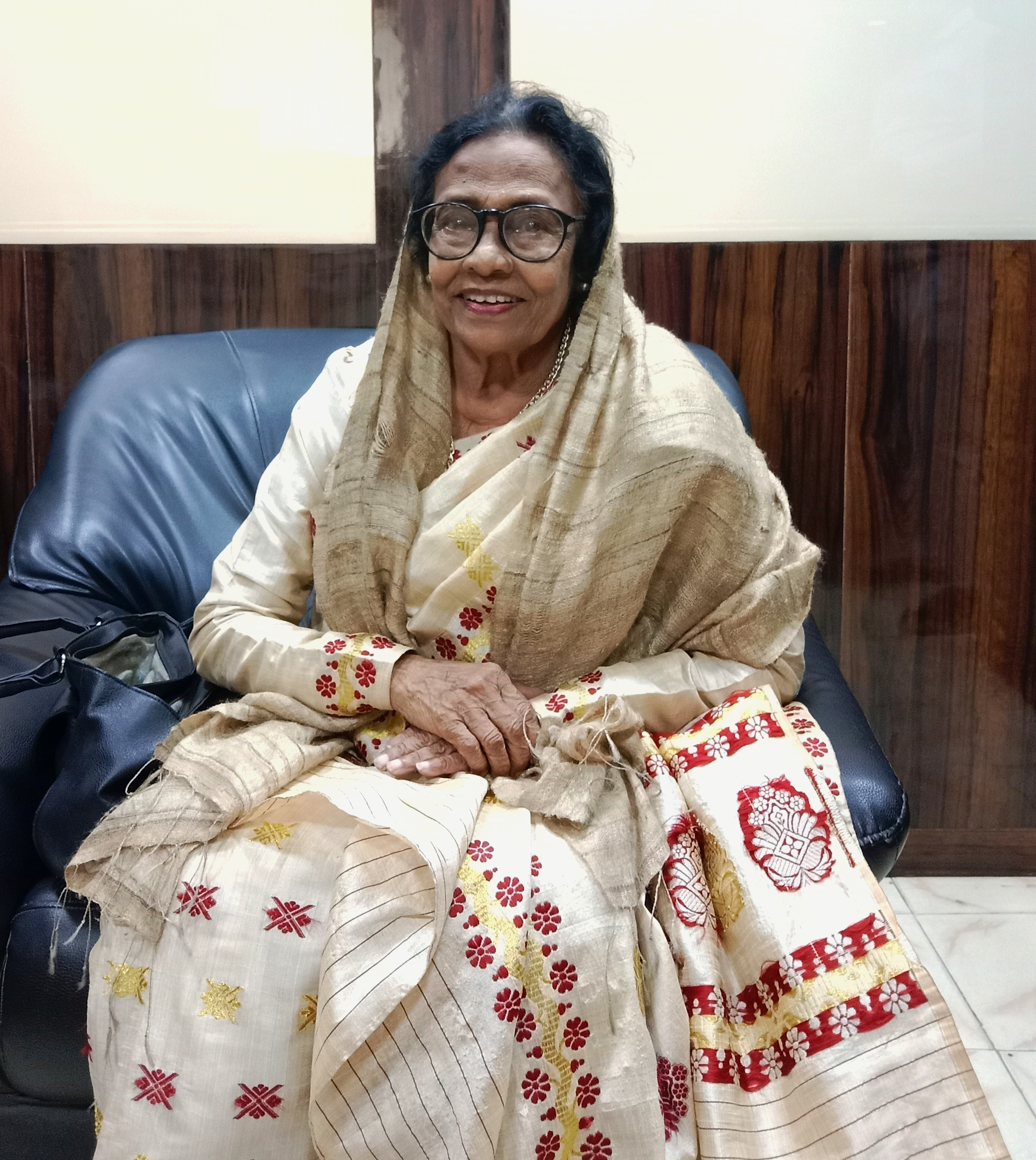
- Eli Ahmed at her residence
- Born: 14 March 1934 (age 92); Nazira, Sibsagar district, British India
- Occupations: Writer, scriptwriter, director, lyricist, costume designer, actress, columnist, and social activist
- Awards: Padma Shri (2017)

Eli Ahmed is an Indian writer, scriptwriter, director, lyricist, costume designer, actress, columnist, and social activist. Since 1970, she has been the editor, publisher, and proprietor of Orani, the only women's magazine in Northeast India. She was awarded the Padma Shri, India's fourth-highest civilian award, in 2017 for her contribution to literature and education.

== Early life ==
Eli Ahmed was born to an aristocratic family in Nazira on March 14, 1934. Her roots grew from one of the five Parsi families referred to in Medini Mohan Choudhury's book Luit, Barak and Islam. Her father Abdur Rashid, was a surgeon. She lost her mother at a young age. She moved to Guwahati in 1965 to interview for a position at a childcare center.

== Career ==
She recited her poems from an early age. In 1967, she formed a children's cultural group named Rong Chora and performed cultural programmes across Assam. That same year, she organised the state's first women’s drama group.

Her first musical feature, Bhagyor Chokori Ghure, was performed in the Nazira session of the Asam Sahitya Sabha in 1962. She made her mark as a lyricist with Dwipen Barua's song "Ga Ga Aji Gai Jaa Ei Geetoke Ga: in Dr. Bezbaruah.

She has written lyrics for films including Baruar Sansar, Sonmoina, Sadari, Sonmaina, Bordoichilla, Zakhinee, Pratidin, Devata, and Dr. Bezbaruah 2, and the television serials Gadhuli, Sahual, and Apabad.

She was the scriptwriter for Assamese films such as Baruar Sansar, Devata, Dhrubatora, Bordoichila, Janambhumi, Mukhagnee/Mukahgni, Jakhini, Bonful/Bonphool, and Rickshawala. She also scripted the documentary films Old Monuments of Ahom Age, Child Psychology, Mahasheeta, Syed Abdul Malik, and The Milk.

She was art director and costume designer for many films.

== Works ==
She has to her credit several successful dramas:

- Bhahkhari
- Kothatunu Ki
- Sakina Jethair Moni
- Kakadeutar Sadhu
- Natusola
- Ami Abhinay Kara Nai

Her books include:

- Ankur, a short story collection
- Moniram Dewan, published by Assam Sahitya Sabha
- Rongmonor Mon
- Moi Ketia Aita Hom, published by Asom Prakashan Parishad
- Asom Birangana, published by the Department of Information and Broadcasting in the Indian government

Ahmed has written over 1,000 poems, stories, and articles for various Assameese newspapers, and has multiple columns in local dailies.

== Recognition ==
- Life member of the Assam Sahitya Sabha
- National literary prize on adult education for Bonphool (1976).
- Dr. Nirmal Prabha Bordoloi Award (2011)
- Amalprava Das Award (2013)
- Padma Shri by the Government of India for her contribution to literature and education (2017)
