= Bobby Sarma Baruah =

Indian Film Maker, Producer and Screenwriter

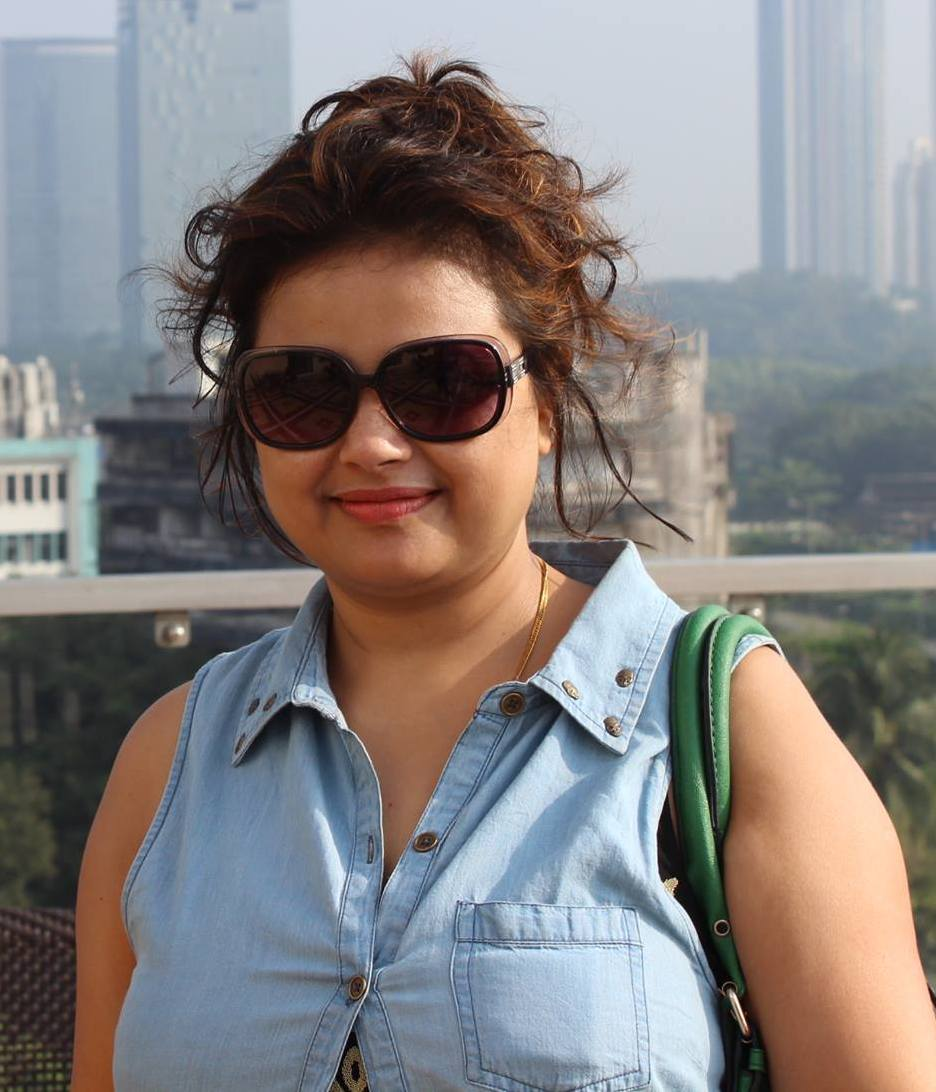
- Occupations: Film Maker, Producer and Screenwriter
- Awards: Best film in Spiritual Category at the 13th Dhaka International Film Festival
- Website: drbobbysarmabaruah.com

Dr. Bobby Sarma Baruah is a national and international award-winning Indian filmmaker, producer and screenwriter whose narrative content on socio-cultural issues in Assam and the Northeast India has been highly appreciated. Her debut feature film Adomya in which she explored the sensitivity and emotional world of women was awarded the best film in the spiritual category at the 13th Dhaka International Film Festival.

Adomya was also screened as an official selection for more than eighteen international film festivals across the world.

Her second venture, Sonar Baran Pakhi, a biopic based on the life and time of the folk singer Late Padmashree Pratima Barua Pandey of Assam has been included as an official entry at various festivals besides winning the Grand Jury prize for the best feature film in the 15th Indian Film Festival of Los Angeles and the best audience choice award at the 15th Dhaka International Film Festival. This movie was also screened at 24 international film festivals around the globe. Her third feature film is Mishing (The Apparition), which own her the Silver Lotus Award (Rajat Kamal) in the 66th National Film Award. The film is in Sherdukpen language and based on the novel Mishing, written by Yeshe Dorjee Thongchi. Mishing (The Apparition) was selected in 24th Kolkata International Film Festival, 23rd International Film Festival of Kerala and it screened almost 20 other international film festivals around the globe. Baruah completed her shooting in her fourth feature film, Sikaisal, which is now in post production stage.

As a director, producer and scriptwriter, Baruah has a number of short films, documentaries, music videos and TV Serials on various indigenous folk cultures blending into one, to her credit. She is also an accomplished poet and a short story writer in the Assamese Language. She has also served as a juror at the Prestigious 14th Dhaka International Film Festival (2016), Lucknow Children's International Film Festival (2016), Served as juror at 8th National Science Film Festival of India, 2018.. Served as a juror at the Hiru Golden Film Awards. She was also awarded the Senior Fellowship from Ministry of Culture, Government of India on the Topic "Ethnic Jewellery with attire of the Eight States of North-East India".

Dr. Bobby Sarma Baruah completed her Ph.D. from the Department of Mass communication and Journalism, Guwahati University on the topic "Reflection of the folk culture of Assam in Assamese cinema".

== Early life ==
Born to a family of creative minds, Baruah's father was a sculptor, a painter and an artist of high caliber. She inherited the inventive and artistic genes of her father which later on shaped the course of life. Her mother was also an artist who laid the very foundation of freedom of expression among her children by teaching them to sing and dance, thus stimulating them with their originative ideas . Oldest among the three siblings, she bloomed creatively under the encouragement of her mother and learnt to sing and dance, participating in various cultural competitions, winning numerous prizes. She also developed great oratory skills which led her to often take part in debates and poetry gatherings. She began with her literary skills since her 5th grade, publishing her poetries in local regional news papers and ever since have been continuing with her creative literary pursuits.

== Education ==
She completed her Schooling from Gohpur and she completed her graduation from B. Borooah College Guwahati, majoring in education. She then completed her bachelor of education degree and went on to complete her master's degree in Assamese Literature from Gauhati University. She then did her second master's degree in Mass Communication and Journalism from Gauhati University, Assam. She completed her PhD from the Department of Mass Communication and Journalism, Guwahati University, on the topic "Reflection of the folk culture of Assam in Assamese cinema". She enrolled herself in the school of Photography owned by Amulya Manna to shape up her creative pursuits. She has also attended the Film Appreciation Course in FTII, Pune. She won a senior national fellowship from the Ministry of Culture, Government of India in 2014 for a research project on ethnic jewellery and costumes of North East.

== Career ==
Baruah began her professional career in media in 2006, starting with making quickies for All India Radio, Guwahati Assam. She also produced and directed music video films Suntora, Sohoror Godhuli and Sohoror Tita Mitha in 2006–2008. She made a number of documentaries and quickies based on regional agriculture in 2009–2010. She directed a popular T V serial for Doordarshan named JivanJatra, various short films like Waiting for a Call, Deuta and Mirror, a thirteen-episode documentary on folk culture of different ethnic communities of Assam. In the year 2009, she produced a stage drama Maya, and directed a documentary film Santosh based on the Indian Post. She also made quickies on behalf of World Bank in 2012–2013. After that she went on to make a six-episode serial for Axom Sarba Siksha Abhijan Mission in 2012–13. She made 3 documentaries for Vigyan Prasar, Ministry of Science and Technology and 15 episodes of a Hindi Series for DD-Arunprabha, Doordarshan Bhawan, New Delhi.

== Filmography ==
Film	Year	Role
Adomya	2014	Director, Producer, Scriptwriter
Sonar Baran Pakhi	2016	Director, Co-producer, Scriptwriter
Mishing	2018	Director, Co-producer, Scriptwriter
Sikaisal	2020	Director
Rador Pakhi (Morning Sunshine)	2026	Director

In 2014 she made her debut as a director, producer and scriptwriter with the feature film Adomya (Indomitable).

In 2016, she made her second feature film as a director, co-producer and scriptwriter for Sonar Baran Pakhi (The Golden Wing) based on a legendary folk singer, Sahitya Academy Awardee, Padma Shri, Pratima Baruah Pandey.

In 2018, she made her third feature film as a director, co-producer and scriptwriter for Mishing (The Apparition) based on a novel written by Sahitya Academy and Padma Shri awardee Yeshe Dorjee Thongchi.

In 2020, Baruah completed her shooting in her fourth feature film, Sikaisal, which is now in post-production stage.

== Awards and honours ==
=== For Adomya ===
- 13th Dhaka International Film Festival (won best film in Spiritual category), Bangladesh, 2014
- 12th Third Eye Asian Film Festival, Mumbai 2014
- 15th Rainbow Film Festival London- 2014
- 1st International Women Film Festival, Bangladesh- 2014
- Cana Film Festival, Singapore- 2014
- 3rd Delhi International Film Festival, 2014
- 7th Bengaluru International Film Festival, 2014
- Mumbai Women's International Film Festival, 2014
- 12th Chennai International Film Festival, 2014
- Kala Ghoda Art Festival, 2014
- 17th London Asian Film Festival, 2015
- Habitat Film Festival, Delhi, 2015
- 46th International Film Festival, Goa (Womenclature of Cinema)

=== For Sonar Baran Pakhi ===
- 15th Dhaka International Film Festival (Won Best Audience Award)
- 15th Indian Film Festival of Los Angeles 2017 (won Grand Jury Award)
- 18th Jio Mami Mumbai Film Festival 2016
- 22nd Kolkata International Film Festival, 2016
- 9th Bengaluru International Film Festival, 2017
- 13th IAWRT Asian Women's Film Festival, 2017
- 15th Third Eye Asian Film Festival 2016
- Khajuraho International Film Festival 2016
- 6th International Film Festival of South Asia – Toronto (IFFSA) 2017
- 20th Flying Broom International Women's Film Festival, Turkey 2017
- Habitat Film Festival 2017
- 13th Jechon International Music and Film Festival, Korea 2017
- Indian Film Festival of Melbourne 2017
- 7th International South Asian Film Festival 2017
- 7th International Folk Music Film Festival, Nepal
- WMAFF, Women Media Arts and Film Festival; Sydney, Australia 2017
- Kaleidoscope Film Festival, New York, 2017
- Chicago South Asian Film Festival, 2017
- Singapore South Asian International Film Festival, 2017

=== For the Feature Film Mishing ===
- 66th National Film Award (Silver Lotus)
- 24th Kolkata International Film Festival 2019
- 23rd International Film Festival of Kerala 2019
- Indian Film Festival of Melbourne, 2019
- Bengaluru International Film Festival, 2019
- Habitat Film Festival, New Delhi, 2019
- Diorama International Film Festival, 2019
- 10th Indian Film Festival of Bhubaneswar 2019
- 2nd Itanagar International Film Festival 2019
- 3rd Guwahati International Film Festival 2019
- 21st Burdwan International Film Festival
- First Biswanath Film Festival 2019
- International Women Film Festival
- MACTA Women International Film Festival (virtual)
