= The Underworld (film) =

2018 Indian Assamese-language film

- Theatrical release poster
- Directed by: Rajesh Jashpal
- Produced by: S J Studio & Entertainment Ltd.
- Starring: Biju Phukan; Nipon Goswami; Zubeen Garg; Parineeta Borthakur; Utpal Das
- Music by: Zubeen Garg
- Distributed by: Eros International
- Release date: 5 October 2018
- Country: India
- Language: Assamese

The Underworld is a 2018 Indian Assamese-language action thriller film featuring Zubeen Garg and Parineeta Borthakur in lead roles. Directed by Rajesh Jashpal and produced by S J Studio & Entertainment Pvt. Ltd. & Raga Films, the film also features Biju Phukan, Nipon Goswami, Pabitra Rabha, Diganta Hazarika, Utpal Das and Baharul Islam.

Eros International, a global company in the Indian film entertainment industry, made its first venture into Assamese cinema by backing up The Underworld.

== Cast ==
- Biju Phukan
- Nipon Goswami
- Zubeen Garg
- Parineeta Borthakur
- Utpal Das
- Diganta Hazarika
- Baharul Islam
- Pabitra Rabha
- Lipika Borah
- Kingkini

== Soundtrack ==
The Underworld

Soundtrack album by Zubeen Garg
- Released: July 2018
- Genre: Feature film soundtrack
- Label: Times Music
- Producer: Zubeen Garg

Zubeen Garg chronology
Priyar Priyo (2017)	The Underworld (2018)	Ratnakar (2019)

Singles from The Underworld
- 1. "Superman" Released: 20 June 2019; 2. "Jaatonare" Released: 21 September 2019

No.	Title	Singer(s)	Length
1.	"Jatonare"	Ananya Dutta, Zubeen Garg
2.	"Superman"	Zubeen Garg
3.	"Thoda Sa Therer Ja"	Parineeta Borthakur
4.	"Ulahe Abore"	Goldie Sohel, Kaveri Singh, Parineeta Borthakur, Zubeen Garg
5.	"The Underworld Theme"	Rahul Gautam Sharma, Zubeen Garg
6.	"Tupa Tupe"	Mousam Gogoi, Satabdi Borah

== Release ==
The underworld movie was released on 5 October 2018, all over the Assam.
