= Yeshe Dorjee Thongchi =

Indian writer (born 1952)

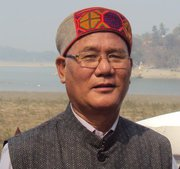
- Born: 13 June 1952; West Kameng, North-East Frontier Agency, India
- Writing career
- Language: Assamese
- Genres: Short Story, Novel, Folk tales, History
- Notable awards: The Bhasha Bharati Award; Sahitya Akademi Award

Yeshe Dorjee Thongchi (born 13 June 1952) is an Arunachali writer. He was formerly a deputy commissioner. His first literary creation is a poem named 'Junbai'.

He is the recipient of India's prestigious award Padma Shri 2020 for his work in the field of literature and education.

== Early life and education ==
Yeshe Dorjee Thongchi, born on June 13, 1952, in Jigaon, West Kameng district, North-East Frontier Agency. Thongchi completed his undergraduate studies at Cotton College and went on to complete his master's degree at Gauhati University.

== Awards ==
- Padmashri- Govt of India, 2020
- Sahitya Akademi Award, 2005 for Assamese novel Mauna Outh Mukhar Hriday (Silent lips, Murmuring Heart)
- Kalaguru Bishnu Rabha Literary Award-Assam Sahitya Sabha-2001
- Sukapha Award- Govt of Assam 2021
- Assam Valley Literary Award- Williamson Megor Educational trust. Kolkata 2017
- Bhasha Bharati Award from the central Institute of Indian languages (CIIL) Mysore. 2005
- Acharjya Hazari Prasad Dwivedi Sanman, Hindi Parishad, Prayagraj 2019
- Bodosa Award- All Moran Students Union, 2019
- Special Achievement Award (Literature)- Buddhist Cultural Preservation Society, Bomdila. 2013
- Sadin-Pratidin Gosthi Special Achievement Award (Literature and Journalism). 2017
- DrBhupen Hazarika Sanhati Bota 2016 by Dr. Bhupen Hazarika Trust, Kolkata-Guwahati
- Rangbang Terang Samanyay Award-2018- Sinthar Prakashan, Bololiaghat, Karbi Anglong. Assam
- Dr.Maidul Islam Bora literary Award, 2014 Dr. M.I Bora Trust, Seebsagar, Assam
- Lakhiminath Bezbaruah Literary Award 2018 Assam
- Phulchand Khandelwal Sanghati Bata award, 2001
- Basudev Jalan Award from Assam Sahitya Sabha
- Bhupen Hazarika National Award 2017 from Sarhad (a Pune based NGO).
- D.Litt (Honoris Causa)-Dibrugarh University Assam

== Works ==
=== Novels ===
- Mauna Outh Mukhar Hriday (Silent lips, Murmuring Heart), 2005
- Sonam, 1982
- Lingjhik
- Bih Kanyar deshat
- Saw kata Manuh
- Mishing
- Moi Akou janam lom

=== Collections of Short Stories ===
- Papor pukhuri (A Sinful of Pond)
- Bah Fular Gundh
- Anya Ekhan pratiyugita
- Dhar aru Ananya Galpa
- The journey

=== Folktales ===
- Kameng Simantar Sadhu

=== History of Community ===
- Sherdukpen Janajatir Itibritya

Travelougue-

- Dhuniya Manuhar Dhuniya Deshat ( Travel to South Korea)

Translations- 1. Into Assamese-

- Sainikar Senapati (Translation of Gen. J.J.Singh's autobiography 'The Soldier's General')
- Prabahat Mukta Jiwan (Translation of His Holiness Dalai Lama's autobiography Freedom in Exile with his foreword)
- Bodhucharyavatara ( Translation of Acharya Shantideva's Sanskrit Buddhist classic of sixth century in poetic form)

2. Into English-

- Heart to Heart (Translation of Lummer Dai's Assamese novel Mon aru Mon)

Autobiography-

- Hanhi aru Sakulor Saisav (First part of autobiography)

== Books ==
Yeshe Dorje Thongchi Books in Amazon.
