= Rowd =

- Directed by: Gautam Baruah
- Screenplay by: Ashim Krishna; Rupam Dutta; Chirantan Mahanta
- Story by: Gautam Baruah
- Produced by: Mousumi Bordoloi
- Starring: Utpal Das; Diganta Hazarika; Moonmi Phukan; Monali Bordoloi
- Cinematography: Bishwabhushan Mahapatra; Bipul Das; Pradip Doimary
- Music by: Jatin Sharma
- Production company: M.B. Films
- Distributed by: 145 minutes
- Release date: 5 October 2012
- Country: India
- Language: Assamese

Rowd (Sunshine) is a 2012 Indian Assamese romantic film directed by Gautam Baruah, with a screenplay by Ashim Krishna, Rupam Dutta, and Chirantan Mahanta, and produced by Mousumi Bordoloi. It stars Utpal Das, Diganta Hazarika, Moonmi Phukan and Monali Bordoloi in the lead roles. It was the debut film for both the director and actress Monali.

== Synopsis ==
A young boy Ankit from a middle-class family who stays in Manali with his parents falls in love with Pooja, a girl from a rich powerful family. Then he faces many challenges in his life.

== Cast ==
- Utpal Das as Ankit
- Diganta Hazarika as Angshuman
- Moonmi Phukan as Emon
- Monali Bordoloi as Pooja
- Bhagawat Pritam as Rudra Pratap Chaliha
- Biju Phukan
- Nikumoni Baruah
- Jayanta Bhagawati
- Padmaraag Goswami
- Hiranya Deka

== Soundtrack ==
Rowd

Soundtrack album by Jatin Sharma
- Released: April 2012
- Recorded: 2011–12
- Genre: Feature film soundtrack
- Length: 37:35
- Language: Assamese
- Label: Times Music; M.B. Films
- Producer: Mousumi Bordoloi

The music of Rowd is composed by Jatin Sharma. Lyrics were by Rajdweep, Jananjay Saikia and Manas Mahanta.

Track listing
No.	Title	Lyrics	Music	Artist(s)	Length
1.	"Xuruj Mukhi"	Jananjay Saikia	Jatin Sharma	Angaraag Mahanta	4:39
2.	"Pakhi Pakhi"	Rajdweep	Jatin Sharma	Angaraag Mahanta, Rupjyoti Devi	5:19
3.	"Tufani Hoi Aha"	Manas Mahanta	Jatin Sharma	Zubeen Garg	4:13
4.	"Aasilu Kotenu"	Jananjay Saikia	Jatin Sharma	Zubeen Garg, Mahalakshmi Iyer	4:35
5.	"Rangin Polithin"	Manas Mahanta	Jatin Sharma	Raaj J Konwar	6:50
6.	"Kinu Jadu"	Rajdweep	Jatin Sharma	Shreya Phukan	3:10
7.	"Tufani (club mix)"	Manas Mahanta	Jatin Sharma	Raaj J Konwar, Sourin Chowdhury	4:44
8.	"Triangle"	Sourin Chowdhury	Jatin Sharma
Total length:					37:35
