= Anuradha (2015 film) =

- Directed by: Rakesh Sharma
- Written by: Rakesh Sharma
- Produced by: Luit Kumar Barman
- Starring: Meghranjani; Diganta Hazarika; Joy Kashyap; Suruj Kalita; Taniya Nandy; Pranami Bora; Nayan Saikia
- Cinematography: Suruj Deka
- Edited by: Ratul Deka
- Music by: Geet Priyam
- Release date: 27 March 2015
- Country: India
- Language: Assamese

Anuradha is an Assamese language drama film directed by Rakesh Sharma and starring Meghranjani and Diganta Hazarika in the lead roles. The film was produced by Luit Kumar Barman under the banner of M L Entertainment and Cine Dream Unlimited, and released on 27 March 2015.

== Plot ==
The movie is based on the central character Anuradha (Meghranjani). It is about a woman abandoned by her husband to lead an unexpected solitary life in the laps of nature. The movie showcases different inner conflicts in various female characters in a male dominated Indian society. This movie explores different female mythological characters of Indian culture like Kunti, Shakuntala, Chitangada, Supornakha etc. and analyse their relevance to the common present day women.

== Cast ==
- Meghranjani
- Diganta Hazarika
- Joy Kashyap
- Pranami Bora
- Suruj Kalita
- Taniya Nandy
- Nayan Saikia

== Production ==
Story, dialog and screenplay of the film is the director's own. The editor of the film is Ratul Deka. Executive producer is Diganta Saikiya. Cinematography by Suruz Deka. Main assistant director is Anupam Baisya .

== Soundtrack ==
Anuradha

Soundtrack album by Geet Priyam
- Released: 14 February 2014
- Length: 28:42
- Language: Assamese
- Label: M.L. Entertainment
- Producer: Luit Kumar Barman

Music director of the film Anuradha is Geet Priyam. The singers are Zubeen Garg, Angaraag Mahanta, Rupam Bhuyan, Prarthona Gogoi, Anita Borthakur and Sourabh Mahanta. The music and lyrics of this movie is composed by Geet Priyam. Renowned singers like Zubeen Garg, Angaraag Mahanata and others have contributed in the music album. The songs "Boi Jua" by Angaraag Mahanta is being considered as one of the best Assamese songs of 2014. All the other songs were also well received by audience with the positive response. The music of the album was released on 14 February 2014 by Prafulla Kumar Mahanta, former Chief Minister of Assam.

Tracklist
No.	Title	Lyrics	Music	Artist(s)	Length
1.	"Echerenga Puhar"	Geet Priyam	Geet Priyam	Zubeen Garg	2:42
2.	"Boi Jua"	Geet Priyam	Geet Priyam	Angaraag Mahanta	5:36
3.	"Shillongore Kuoli"	Geet Priyam	Geet Priyam	Rupam Bhuyan	3:27
4.	"Theme Song"	Geet Priyam	Geet Priyam	Sourabh Mahanta	5:47
5.	"Gun Gun"	Geet Priyam	Geet Priyam	Anita B Deka	2:08
6.	"Tupa Tupe"	Geet Priyam	Geet Priyam	Prarthona Gogoi	3:00
7.	"Boi Jua - Version 2"	Geet Priyam	Geet Priyam	Sourabh Mahanta	5:38
Total length:					28:42
