= Diganta Hazarika =

Indian actor and model (born 1984)

- Born: 23 September 1984 (age 41); Nagaon, Assam, India
- Occupations: Actor, Model
- Years active: 2009-present
- Known for: Mohenjo Daro; Pathaan

Diganta Hazarika is an Indian actor and model who acts in Assamese and Hindi films. He is known for his roles in films such as Mohenjo Daro (2016) and Pathaan (2023).

== Early life ==
Diganta Hazarika was born on 23 September 1984 in Puranigudam, Nagaon, Assam, India.

== Career ==
Hazarika made his acting debut in an Assamese short film, Ki Naam Di Matim. After that he acted in the Assamese films Grahan, Rishang, Rowd and Anuradha. His latest Assamese film was Pratighaat (2019), directed by Achinta Shankar. Hazarika made his Hindi film debut in Mohenjo Daro (2016), where he played the role of Lothar. Before that, he acted in the Indian TV drama Everest, directed by Ashutosh Gowariker.

== Filmography ==
=== Films ===
Year	Title	Director	Role	Language	Ref(s).
2009	Ki Naam Di Matim	Manash Baruah		Assamese	
2012	Rishang	Manash Baruah		Assamese	
2012	Rowd	Gautam Baruah		Assamese	
2014	Grahan	Farhin Chowdhury		Assamese	
2015	Anuradha	Rakesh Sharma		Assamese	
2016	Mohenjo Daro	Ashutosh Gowariker	Lothar	Hindi	
2018	The Underworld	Rajesh Jashpal		Assamese	
2019	Pratighaat	Achinta Shankar		Assamese	
2023	Pathaan	Siddharth Anand	Joseph Mathews	Hindi	

=== Television ===
Year	Title
2015	Everest
2013	Moromor Anuradha (Assamese TV series)
2012	Ragini (Assamese TV series)
2012	Pratigya (Assamese TV series)
