= Dr. Bezbarua =

Doctor Bezbarua
- Theatrical release poster of Dr. Bezbarua
- Directed by: Brajen Barua
- Written by: Brajen Barua
- Produced by: Rangghar Cine Productions
- Starring: Brajen Barua; Nipon Goswami; Meghali Devi; Pratibha Thakur; Renu Saikia
- Cinematography: Sujit Singha
- Music by: Ramen Barua
- Release date: 7 November 1969
- Country: India
- Language: Assamese

Dr. Bezbarua is a 1969 Indian Assamese language thriller film, the first film of this genre in the language, directed by Brajen Barua and produced by Rangghar Cine Productions. The film was released on 7 November 1969. It marked the beginning of success of commercial films in Assamese cinema. It was also first time the outdoor and indoor shooting entirely took place in various locations of Assam.

== Plot ==
Dr. Bezbarua, a hardworking doctor who has finished his studies in England, decides to open his own laboratory in a place near Dibrugarh to serve the country. His son Moti disappears while his childhood friend Lalit Duwara, the owner of a tea plantation, was visiting Dr. Bezbarua's laboratory with his family. Dr. Bezbarua blames himself for the incident and begins to live under the influence of alcohol.

One night, some thugs come and capture the doctor and occupy his laboratory and hospital. They take the disguise of Dr. Bezbarua, and put themselves in the position of doctors and do despicable things. Lalit Duwara's wife looses her mental balance after the loss of her son and comes to Dibrugarh to see Dr. Bezbarua (actually the fake doctors). On their way back from Dibrugarh, they see a small boy sitting in the back of their car. The boy has the name Pradeep engraved on his hand, the Duwara family adopt him.

Pradeep grows up to be a doctor and goes to Dibrugarh, he learns the truth and defeats the gang of bad guys and rescues Dr. Bezbaruah who learns that Pradeep is his missing child Moti.

== Cast ==
- Brajen Barua as Dr. A. S. Bezbarua
- Nipon Goswami as Dr. Pradeep / Moti Bezbarua
- Satyen Chowdhury as Lalit Duwara
- Pratibha Thakur
- Renu Saikia
- Meghali Devi
- Biju Phukan
- Tara
- Tarun Dowrah as Param Hazarika
- Ranjana Bordoloi

== Music ==
The music of the film was composed by Ramen Barua, the younger brother of director Brajen Barua.

No.	Title	Singers	Lyrics
1	Jilika Jilika Tora Akakhore	Dwipen Barua	Brajen Barua
2	Ki Naam Di Matim	Dwipen Barua, Nirmala Mishra	Nirmal Prabha Bordoloi
3	Moyna Kon Bidhatai Xajile	Dwipen Barua	Brajen Barua
4	Phool Phool Phool	Dwipen Barua, Nirmala Mishra	Eli Ahmed

== Awards ==
Dr. Bezbarua was awarded with the silver medal for Best Feature Film in Assamese at the 17th National Film Awards.

== Legacy ==
A Hindi film titled Shivam (2011) has been remade from this film. It was produced by Jogiraj Choudhury and directed by Anshuman Barua, nephew of the film's original director Brojen Barua.

A sequel, Dr. Bezbaruah 2, was released on 3 February 2023 after 53 years, being a colour sequel to this black and white film.
