= Medini Choudhury =

Indian novelist, columnist

- Born: March 31, 1928; Goreswar, Assam, India
- Died: February 13, 2003 (aged 74); Chennai, India
- Education: Cotton University
- Occupations: Novelist; Short story writer; Columnist; Critic; Civil services officer
- Children: 7
- Writing career
- Language: Assamese, English
- Years active: 1975–2003
- Subjects: Social, Culture, Literature
- Notable awards: Full list

Medini Mohan Choudhury (31 March 1928 – 13 February 2003), known by his pen name as Medini Choudhury, was a Bodo novelist, short story writer, columnist, critic and a retired civil services officer. He wrote thirty books in Assamese language and two books in English, including Ananya Prantor, a novel which is recognized one of the prominent writings in Assamese literature.

He also worked at literary magazines and newspapers such as Asomiya, a weekly newspaper, Dainik Santidoot and Samakaal. He worked as an editor for Sutradhar magazine, and primarily used to wrote stort stories, columns and essays for newspapers and magazines.

== Biography ==
He was born on 31 March 1928 in Goreswar town of Kamrup district, Assam in a Bodo family. He graduated in 1949 from the Cotton College (now Cotton University). He had three daughters and four sons. Prior to joining civil services, he worked as a journalist. Later in 1956, he left journalism and started working as a government officer due to personal financial crisis. He also wrote a book titled Luit, Barak aru Islam that covers contribution of the Muslims to the Assam Movement.

== Publications ==
Key
†	Remarks denote a short description of the work where available.

#	Title	Year	Type/Credited as	Remarks	Ref.
1	Anonyo Prantor (Unique Peripheries)	1975	Novel	It was the first novel he wrote	
2	Banduka Behar	1976	Novel	—N/a	
3	Taat Nodi Nachil (No River There)	—N/a	Novel	—N/a	
4	Pherengadao	—N/a	Novel	—N/a	
5	Aranya Aadim (Forests Primitive)	—N/a	Novel	—N/a	
6	Bipanna Samay (Endangered Hours)	—N/a	Novel	The novel was awarded Sahitya Akademi Award in 1999	
7	Ferengadao	—N/a	Book	—N/a	
8	Mahapurush Madhavdev	—N/a	Novel	—N/a	
9	Jadugharar Kirtimukh	—N/a	Novel	—N/a	
10	Nibandhita Anubhav	—N/a	Novel	—N/a	
11	Luit, Barak aru Islam	—N/a	Book	Covers contribution to the Muslims to the Assam Agitation	
12	Yangjoo Nadir Paar	—N/a	Novel	—N/a	
13	Kholakotir Taal	—N/a	Book	—N/a	
14	Bipanna Xamay	—N/a	Book	—N/a	
15	Bodo Dimasa of Assam	—N/a	Book	—N/a	
16	Tribes of Assam Plains	—N/a	Book	—N/a	
17	Making a Leader	—N/a	Book	—N/a	
18	Xihote Kewal	—N/a	Short story	—N/a	

== Awards and accordion ==
Year	Nominated work	Award	Category	Result	Ref.
1997	In recognition of his contribution to the Assam literature	Publication Board Assam Literary Award	Literature	Won	
1999	Bipponna Samay	Sahitya Akademi Award	Literature	Won	
2002	—N/a	A state level award by the Government of Assam	Culture	Won	

== Death ==
Choudhury was suffering from medical complications, and was admitted to a hospital for medical treatment. He was later admitted to a medical college in Chennai where he died of myocardial infarction on 13 February 2003. He was cremated at Nabagraha crematorium in Assam.
