= Sripuria, Tinsukia =

Sripuria, also spelled as Sreepuria, is a locality of the city of Tinsukia, Assam, India.
