= Sonar Baran Pakhi =

- Directed by: Bobby Sarma Baruah
- Written by: Bobby Sarma Baruah; Bhaskar Jyoti Das; Jiten Sarma
- Produced by: Bobby Sarma Baruah; ASFFDC
- Starring: Pranjal Saikia; Kamal Priya Das; Nilim Chetiia; Pranami Bora; Susmita Ray; Dhruba Jyoti Kumar; Arati Baruah; Jagadish Deka
- Cinematography: Avijit Nandi
- Edited by: Ratul Deka
- Music by: Saurav Mahanta
- Production company: Assam State Film (Finance and Development) Corporation Ltd.
- Distributed by: BB Entertainment.
- Release dates: 23 October 2016 (Jio MAMI Mumbai Film Festival); 24 November 2017
- Country: India
- Languages: Goalpariya; Assamese; Rajbongshi

Sonar Baran Pakhi (The Golden Wing) is a 2016 Indian biographical film based on life of the Assamese folk singer Pratima Barua Pandey. The film was directed by Bobby Baruah Sarma. Sonar Baran Pakhi is the first Rajbangshi-language film. It was voted Best Feature Film at the Indian Film Festival of Los Angeles.

== Cast ==
- Pranami Bora as Old Pratima Barua Pandey
- Pranjal Saikia as Prakritish Baruah
- Arati Baruah as Old Pratima Barua Pandey
- Kamal Priya Das as Pratima's mother
- Susmita Ray as Kid Pratima Barua Pandey
- Jagadish Deka as Ganga Sankar Pandey
- Dhruba Jyoti Kumar as Ritwik Ghatak
- Nilim Chetiia as Bhupen Hazarika
