= Maj Rati Keteki =

- Directed by: Santwana Bardoloi
- Written by: Santwana Bardoloi
- Starring: Adil Hussain; Shakil Imtiaz; Mahendra Rabha; Sulakshana Baruah
- Cinematography: Gnana Shekar V.S.
- Edited by: Ushma Bardoloi
- Music by: Anurag Saikia
- Release date: 27 October 2017
- Running time: 116 minutes
- Country: India
- Language: Assamese

Maj Rati Keteki is a 2017 Indian Assamese drama film written and directed by Santwana Bardoloi. The film stars Adil Hussain in the lead role. Hussain wins National Film Award – Special Mention (feature film) at 64th National Film Awards for acting in this film.

== Plot ==
After a long gap of more than ten years, renowned writer Priyendu Hazarika returns to the town where once he was inspired to begin his journey as a writer. A book at times imitates the author's life. The book in question is an imaginary one, "A River Runs Ashore", woven into a meta-narrative. Memories stir and he remembers people he loved and lost. The conceit of his frequent meandering into memories gives shape to a saga of childhood and loss set in rustic North Guwahati. He admits to lacking the courage to weave a painful, harsh truth into his stories. At the end of the day however, he decides to face his own truth, alone, away from the appreciative audience.

== Cast ==
- Adil Hussain
- Shakil Imtiaz
- Mahendra Rabha
- Sulakshana Baruah
- Pranami Bora
- Rahul Gautam Sharma
- Kasvi Sharma
