= Prastuti Porasor =

Indian actress

- Born: 15 December 1980 (age 44); Jorhat, Assam
- Occupation: Actress
- Years active: 1999 - present

Prastuti Porasor is an Indian actress. She works in Assamese cinema and stage dramas. She has acted in critically acclaimed and commercially successful films, including Tumi Mor Matho Mor (2000), Suren Suror Putek (2005), Raamdhenu (2011), and Doordarshan Eti Jantra (2016).

== Early life ==
Prastuti Porasor was born at Malow Ali in Jorhat, Assam. Her father Bijoy Chandra Sarma was the former principal of Jagannath Barooah College.

== Career ==
She started acting aged 5 through a serial named Barnali in Doordarshan Guwahati. Her debut in Assamese film was Bani Das's Maharathi, which was released in 1999. She

== Filmography ==
=== Feature films ===
Year	Film	Director
1999	Maharathi	Bani Das
2000	Tumi Mur Mathu Mur	Zubeen Garg
2000	Asene Kunuba Hiyat	Baharul Islam
2001	Aai Maram Tumar Babe	Taufique Rahman
2002	Gun Gun Gane Gane	Bidyut Chakravarty
2002	Priya O Priya	Anjan Kalita
2002	Jakham	Munna Ahmed
2002	Prem Aru Prem	Sambhu Gupta
2002	Jiban Nabir Duti Par	Munna Ahmed
2003	Eyei Jonak Biheen Jivan	Munna Ahmed
2003	Jumon Sumon	Mohibul Haque
2004	Antaheen Jatra	Munna Ahmed
2004	Hridoy Kapowa Gaan	Jayanta Nath
2004	Barood	Munin Barua
2004	Rong	Munin Barua
2004	Dinabandhoo	Munin Barua
2005	Suren Suror Putek	Chandra Mudoi
2011	Raamdhenu	Munin Barua
2012	Me & My Sister	Rajesh Bhuyan
2015	Ahetuk	Bani Das
2015	Tez	Bhaskar Upadhyaya
2016	Doordarshan Eti Jantra	Rajesh Bhuyan
2016	Paglee	Rupjyoti Borah
2017	Mriganabhi	Hemen Das
2022	Ganga	Mani Sinha
2024	Protishruti	Kishor Tahbildar
2025	Koka Deuta Hati Aaru Nati 2	Biswajeet Borah

=== Television ===
- Barnali
- Nisar Nayak
- Chakrabehu
- Mahanagar
- Major Sahab
- Jonakat Siharan
- Bindaas
- Sendur
- Saahu Buwari ( Anthology series:lead in a story)
- Prohelika (Anthology series: lead in a story)
- Yeh Dosti
- Rakhe Hori Mare Kune

=== Stage plays ===
- Rupalim
- Nimati Koina
- Aparahna
- Asankar Din Rati
