= List of plays of Assamese Mobile Theatres for the season 2011–2012 =

This is the list of plays of various Assamese mobile theatre groups, popularly known as Bhraymaman theatres, for the season 2011–2012. The unique culture of Assam, the mobile theatres providing entertainment in both urban and rural areas of the state and has a record turnover of Rs 10 cr annually, beating the common notion of theatre artists not being paid well.

Season 2019-20 Kohinoor Theatre. Entry for first time in theatre industry by Kohinoor Theatre. A talented Assamese film and theatre Actress Sharmistha Chakraborty, who played the role "Droupadi" from drama 'Droupadir Vastraharan'. She is known Droupadi of Kohinoor. Her popularity is an inspiration theatre industry. From then, she is continue in Assamese mobile theatre industry.

== List of Plays ==
#	Theatre	Play	Playwright	Starring
1	Aawahan	Alinggan	Abhijeet Bhattacharya	Chandana Sharma, Pal Phukan, Chinmoy Kotoky etc.
1	Aawahan	Koinar Poduli Uduli-Muduli	Munin Baruah	Chandana Sharma, Pal Phukan, Chinmoy Kotoky etc.
1	Aawahan	Maa	Abhijeet Bhattacharya	Chandana Sharma, Pal Phukan, Chinmoy Kotoky etc.
2	Anuradha	Atangka	Roma Barman	
2	Anuradha	Dodhisi	Mahendra Borthakur	
2	Anuradha	Nabanita	Bhaskarjyoti Talukdaar	
3	Ashirwad	Kiya Ene Hoi	Sebabrat Baruah	Raag Ainitam, Arup Baishya, Robin Neog, Gayatri Bora etc.
3	Ashirwad	Sayane Sapune Zubeen	Abhijeet Bhattacharya	Raag Ainitam, Arup Baishya, Robin Neog, Gayatri Bora etc.
3	Ashirwad	Tumar Naamere Torali	Samarendra Barman	Raag Ainitam, Arup Baishya, Robin Neog, Gayatri Bora etc.
4	Bhagyadevi	Malobika Mur Bandhabi	Abhijeet Bhattacharya	Jatin Bora, Asha Bordoloi, Swagata Baruah etc.
4	Bhagyadevi	Raktabidyut Pathak B.A.	Abhijeet Bhattacharya	Jatin Bora, Asha Bordoloi, Swagata Baruah etc.
4	Bhagyadevi	Sagar Tumi Kot	Tilak Baishya	Jatin Bora, Asha Bordoloi, Swagata Baruah etc.
5	Binapani	Hello Hello Bhanti	Samarendra Barman	Biju Borkakoti, Toilukya Dutta, Uttam Dutta, Neelakshi Saikia etc.
5	Binapani	Koina Sajaba Kune	Ananta Dutta	Biju Borkakoti, Toilukya Dutta, Uttam Dutta, Neelakshi Saikia etc.
5	Binapani	Lajja	Avatar Singh	Biju Borkakoti, Toilukya Dutta, Uttam Dutta, Neelakshi Saikia etc.
5	Binapani	Nastachandra	Jiten Sharma	Biju Borkakoti, Toilukya Dutta, Uttam Dutta, Neelakshi Saikia etc.
6	Bordoisila	Agnigarbha Lena	Prahash Kumar Bhattacharya	Mridul Chutia, Tarak Das etc.
6	Bordoisila	Antaheen	Mridul Chutia	Mridul Chutia, Tarak Das etc.
6	Bordoisila	Rajpathat Dujoni Chuali	Abhijeet Bhattacharya	Mridul Chutia, Tarak Das etc.
7	Brindaban	Bih aru Amrit	Munin Baruah	Champak Sharma, Rajkumar Talukdar, Olympica etc.
7	Brindaban	Bodnam	Champak Sharma	Champak Sharma, Rajkumar Talukdar, Olympica etc.
7	Brindaban	Mon Toi Pagal Kiyo	Abhijeet Bhattacharya	Champak Sharma, Rajkumar Talukdar, Olympica etc.
8	Dharitri	Dhuniya Chualir Mon	Ananta Dutta	
8	Dharitri	Dom Domadom Madal Baje	Samarendra Barman	
8	Dharitri	Megha Aru Nai	Krishna Bordoloi	
8	Dharitri	Urukha Pojat Tumi	Ashim Baruah	
9	Hengool	Chamak	Abhijeet Bhattacharya	Ravi Sharma, Prasenjit Borah, Kalpana, Simi etc.
9	Hengool	Khiriki	Munin Baruah	Ravi Sharma, Prasenjit Borah, Kalpana, Simi etc.
9	Hengool	Morisika	Abhijeet Bhattacharya	Ravi Sharma, Prasenjit Borah, Kalpana, Simi etc.
10	Himaloy	Epahi Gulap Phool	Abhijeet Bhattacharya	Nayan Nirban Baruah, Mahendra Sharma, Nisha Kashyap, Dharmeswar Talukdar etc.
10	Himaloy	Kharu	Mahendra Sharma	Nayan Nirban Baruah, Mahendra Sharma, Nisha Kashyap, Dharmeswar Talukdar etc.
10	Himaloy	Torai Jolabo Saki	Samarendra Barman	Nayan Nirban Baruah, Mahendra Sharma, Nisha Kashyap, Dharmeswar Talukdar etc.
11	Itihash	Deuta Ejon Beya Manuh	Abhijeet Bhattacharya	Aakashdeep, Bhranti Medhi, Biraj Ballav, Binoy Deka etc.
11	Itihash	Raja	Samarendra Barman	Aakashdeep, Bhranti Medhi, Biraj Ballav, Binoy Deka etc.
11	Itihash	Sapunar Railgari	Abhijeet Bhattacharya	Aakashdeep, Bhranti Medhi, Biraj Ballav, Binoy Deka etc.
12	Jagaran	Dabanal	Sebabrat Baruah	Bhabesh Baruah, Paresh Goswami, Mohan Saikia etc.
12	Jagaran	Ran Hungkar	Abhijeet Bhattacharya	Bhabesh Baruah, Paresh Goswami, Mohan Saikia etc.
12	Jagaran	Zed	Dhrubajyoti Sharma	Bhabesh Baruah, Paresh Goswami, Mohan Saikia etc.
13	Kohinoor	Bhal Pau Buli Nokoba	Abhijeet Bhattacharya	Barsha Rani Bishaya, Dibyajyoti Das, Hiren Medhi, Dulumoni Deka etc.
13	Kohinoor	Kopouphul	Abhijeet Bhattacharya	Barsha Rani Bishaya, Dibyajyoti Das, Hiren Medhi, Dulumoni Deka etc.
13	Kohinoor	Path	Hemanta Dutta	Barsha Rani Bishaya, Dibyajyoti Das, Hiren Medhi, Dulumoni Deka etc.
13	Kohinoor	Titanic	Hemanta Dutta	Barsha Rani Bishaya, Dibyajyoti Das, Hiren Medhi, Dulumoni Deka etc.
14	Manchajyoti	Bhiksha	Bhaben Baruah	Toilukya Sharma, Dalimi Medhi, Tarun Rajbanshi, Tapan Barman etc.
14	Manchajyoti	Priyo Shatru	Samarendra Barman	Toilukya Sharma, Dalimi Medhi, Tarun Rajbanshi, Tapan Barman etc.
14	Manchajyoti	Ramjanor Jonaak	Samarendra Barman	Toilukya Sharma, Dalimi Medhi, Tarun Rajbanshi, Tapan Barman etc.
15	Pragjyotish	Daagi	Dhrubajyoti Sharma	Aroop Borah, Dwipen Bhuyan, Ashwini Baruah etc.
15	Pragjyotish	Maya Memsahab	Samarendra Barman	Aroop Borah, Dwipen Bhuyan, Ashwini Baruah etc.
15	Pragjyotish	Nisanga Nayak	Avatar Singh	Aroop Borah, Dwipen Bhuyan, Ashwini Baruah etc.
16	Prithviraaj	Baaji	Champak Sharma	
16	Prithviraaj	Ekhoni Neela Chador	Nripen Mahanta	
16	Prithviraaj	Gouripuriya Sengri Moi	Bhaskarjyoti Talukdaar	
16	Prithviraaj	Puwoti Nishar Azan	Samarendra Barman	
17	Rajashree	Baa, Bada aru Babli	Abhijeet Bhattacharya	Pranjit Das, Meenakshi Neog, Moitreyi Goswami etc.
17	Rajashree	Bandi	Sebabrat Baruah	Pranjit Das, Meenakshi Neog, Moitreyi Goswami etc.
17	Rajashree	Nabin Masta	Hemanta Dutta	Pranjit Das, Meenakshi Neog, Moitreyi Goswami etc.
18	Rajmahal	Anuradha Tumar Babe	Dhrubajyoti Sharma	Panchali Gupta, Bhaskar Tamuli, Rajkumar Thakur etc.
18	Rajmahal	Lajja	Samarendra Barman	Panchali Gupta, Bhaskar Tamuli, Rajkumar Thakur etc.
18	Rajmahal	Mon	Hemanta Dutta	Panchali Gupta, Bhaskar Tamuli, Rajkumar Thakur etc.
19	Rajtilak	Astitwa	Abhijeet Bhattacharya	Niranjan Das, Mridul Bhuyan, Debishmita, Child Artist Apple etc.
19	Rajtilak	Atmasandhan	Hemanta Dutta	Niranjan Das, Mridul Bhuyan, Debishmita, Child Artist Apple etc.
19	Rajtilak	Maya Mathu Maya	Abhijeet Bhattacharya	Niranjan Das, Mridul Bhuyan, Debishmita, Child Artist Apple etc.
19	Rajtilak	Teje Dhuwa Gamucha	Dhrubajyoti Sharma	Niranjan Das, Mridul Bhuyan, Debishmita, Child Artist Apple etc.
20	Roopayan	Beya Manuhor Khang	Samarendra Barman	Jayanta Das, Rabindra Sharma, Kamal Rewati, Deepraj etc.
20	Roopayan	Kurukhetra	Avatar Singh	Jayanta Das, Rabindra Sharma, Kamal Rewati, Deepraj etc.
20	Roopayan	Moi Mahatma Nohou	Dhrubajyoti Sharma	Jayanta Das, Rabindra Sharma, Kamal Rewati, Deepraj etc.
20	Roopayan	Mone Mone Maram	Abhijeet Bhattacharya	Jayanta Das, Rabindra Sharma, Kamal Rewati, Deepraj etc.
21	Saraighat	Amator Maat	Reba Bora	Pradip Nisith, Reba Bora, Gunen Sharma, Jayanta Baruah etc.
21	Saraighat	Hindustan-Pakistan	Pradip Nisith	Pradip Nisith, Reba Bora, Gunen Sharma, Jayanta Baruah etc.
21	Saraighat	Maya Mathu Maya	Nirmal Das	Pradip Nisith, Reba Bora, Gunen Sharma, Jayanta Baruah etc.
21	Saraighat	Sarkar	Samarendra Barman	Pradip Nisith, Reba Bora, Gunen Sharma, Jayanta Baruah etc.
22	Srimanta Shankardev	Lukabhaku	Debojeet Sharma	Debojeet Sharma, Momi Deka, Jugal Bihari Deka, Spondon etc.
22	Srimanta Shankardev	Maram Jasibo Kune	Sebabrat Baruah	Debojeet Sharma, Momi Deka, Jugal Bihari Deka, Spondon etc.
22	Srimanta Shankardev	Phanki	Samarendra Barman	Debojeet Sharma, Momi Deka, Jugal Bihari Deka, Spondon etc.
23	Suruj	Atripto Atmar Binoni	Tarini Deka	
23	Suruj	Kabarar Kongkal	Bhaben Baruah	
23	Suruj	Kun Aapun Kun Por	Tarini Deka	
