= List of accolades received by Devdas (2002 Hindi film) =

Devdas awards and nominations
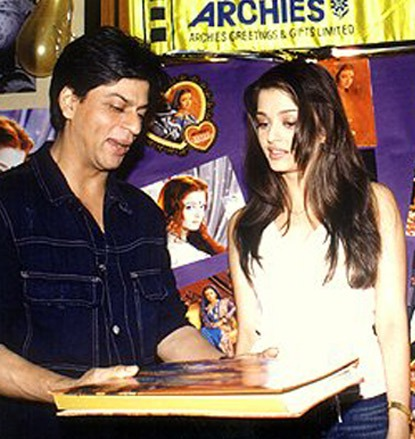
- Shah Rukh Khan (left) and Aishwarya Rai Bachchan garnered several awards and nominations for their performances in Devdas (2002).
Awards and nominations
Award	Wins	Nominations
Bollywood Movie Awards	10	18
British Academy Film Awards	0	1
Filmfare Awards	11	17
International Indian Film Academy Awards	16	17
MTV Asia Awards	1	1
National Film Awards	5	5
Sansui Viewers' Choice Movie Awards	8	15
Screen Awards	10	21
Zee Cine Awards	8	11

Totals (Note: Certain award groups do not simply award one winner. They acknowledge several different recipients, have runners-up, and have third place. Since this is a specific recognition and is different from losing an award, runner-up mentions are considered wins in this award tally. For simplification and to avoid errors, each award in this list has been presumed to have had a prior nomination.)
- Wins: 69
- Nominations: 106

Devdas is a 2002 Indian Hindi-language epic romantic drama film directed by Sanjay Leela Bhansali. It stars Shah Rukh Khan, Aishwarya Rai and Madhuri Dixit, while Kirron Kher, Smita Jaykar and Vijayendra Ghatge play supporting roles. The film's story focuses on Devdas (Khan), a Bachelor of Law student who later becomes an alcoholic after his family rejects his relationship with Paro (Rai Bachchan), Devdas' childhood friend. The film was produced by Bharat Shah for his company Mega Bollywood, and its screenplay was written by Bhansali and Prakash Ranjit Kapadia, who also wrote the dialogue. The soundtrack for Devdas was composed by Ismail Darbar and Birju Maharaj, who co-wrote the lyrics with Nusrat Badr and Sameer Anjaan. Binod Pradhan and Bela Sehgal completed the cinematography and editing, respectively, while Nitin Chandrakant Desai handled the production design.

Made on a budget of ₹500 million (US$5.2 million), Devdas premiered at the 2002 Cannes Film Festival on 23 May 2002 and was released worldwide on 12 July that year. The film received widespread acclaim from critics, and emerged as the highest-grossing Indian film of the year, earning ₹998.8 million (US$10 million). The film won 61 awards from 91 nominations; its direction, music, performances of the cast members, screenplay, cinematography, choreography, costumes and production design have received the most attention from award groups.

Devdas received a nomination for the Best Film Not in the English Language from the 56th British Academy Film Awards. At the 50th National Film Awards, it won five trophies, including Best Popular Film Providing Wholesome Entertainment. The film won eleven awards at the 48th Filmfare Awards, including Best Film, Best Director (Bhansali), Best Actor (Khan), Best Actress (Rai Bachchan) and Best Supporting Actress (Dixit). In the fourth iteration of the International Indian Film Academy Awards, the film garnered seventeen nominations, going on to win sixteen categories, including Best Film, Best Director (Bhansali), Best Actor (Khan), Best Actress (Rai Bachchan) and Best Supporting Actress (Kher).

== Awards and nominations ==
List of accolades received by Devdas
Award	Date of ceremony (Note: Date is linked to the article about the awards held that year, wherever possible.)	Category	Recipient(s)	Result	Ref.
Bollywood Movie Awards	3 May 2003	Best Film	Bharat Shah	Won	
Bollywood Movie Awards	3 May 2003	Best Director	Sanjay Leela Bhansali	Won	
Bollywood Movie Awards	3 May 2003	Best Actor	Shah Rukh Khan	Won	
Bollywood Movie Awards	3 May 2003	Best Actor (Critics)	Shah Rukh Khan	Nominated	
Bollywood Movie Awards	3 May 2003	Most Sensational Actor	Shah Rukh Khan	Nominated	
Bollywood Movie Awards	3 May 2003	Best Actress	Aishwarya Rai Bachchan	Won	
Bollywood Movie Awards	3 May 2003	Best Actress (Critics)	Aishwarya Rai Bachchan	Nominated	
Bollywood Movie Awards	3 May 2003	Most Sensational Actress	Aishwarya Rai Bachchan	Nominated	
Bollywood Movie Awards	3 May 2003	Best Supporting Actress	Kirron Kher	Won	
Bollywood Movie Awards	3 May 2003	Best Music Director	Ismail Darbar	Nominated	
Bollywood Movie Awards	3 May 2003	Best Lyricist	Nusrat Badr (for "Dola Re Dola")	Nominated	
Bollywood Movie Awards	3 May 2003	Best Playback Singer – Female	Kavita Krishnamurthy (for "Maar Daala")	Nominated	
Bollywood Movie Awards	3 May 2003	Best Playback Singer – Female	Shreya Ghoshal (for "Bairi Piya")	Nominated	
Bollywood Movie Awards	3 May 2003	Best Choreography	Saroj Khan (for "Dola Re Dola")	Won	
Bollywood Movie Awards	3 May 2003	Best Cinematography	Binod Pradhan	Won	
Bollywood Movie Awards	3 May 2003	Best Costume Designer	Neeta Lulla	Won	
Bollywood Movie Awards	3 May 2003	Best Editing	Bela Sehgal	Won	
Bollywood Movie Awards	3 May 2003	Best Screenplay	Prakash Ranjit Kapadia, Sanjay Leela Bhansali	Won	
British Academy Film Awards	23 February 2003	Best Film Not in the English Language	Devdas	Nominated	
Filmfare Awards	21 February 2003	Best Film	Devdas	Won	
Filmfare Awards	21 February 2003	Best Director	Sanjay Leela Bhansali	Won	
Filmfare Awards	21 February 2003	Best Actor	Shah Rukh Khan	Won	
Filmfare Awards	21 February 2003	Best Actress	Aishwarya Rai Bachchan	Won	
Filmfare Awards	21 February 2003	Best Supporting Actor	Jackie Shroff	Nominated	
Filmfare Awards	21 February 2003	Best Supporting Actress	Kirron Kher	Nominated	
Filmfare Awards	21 February 2003	Best Supporting Actress	Madhuri Dixit	Won	
Filmfare Awards	21 February 2003	Best Music Director	Ismail Darbar	Nominated	
Filmfare Awards	21 February 2003	Best Lyricist	Nusrat Badr (for "Dola Re Dola")	Nominated	
Filmfare Awards	21 February 2003	Best Playback Singer – Female	Kavita Krishnamurthy, Shreya Ghoshal (for "Dola Re Dola")	Won	
Filmfare Awards	21 February 2003	Best Playback Singer – Female	Kavita Krishnamurthy (for "Maar Daala")	Nominated	
Filmfare Awards	21 February 2003	Best Playback Singer – Female	Shreya Ghoshal (for "Bairi Piya")	Nominated	
Filmfare Awards	21 February 2003	Best Cinematography	Binod Pradhan	Won	
Filmfare Awards	21 February 2003	Best Scene of the Year	Confrontation scene between Parvati and Chandramukhi	Won	
Filmfare Awards	21 February 2003	Best Choreography	Saroj Khan (for "Dola Re Dola")	Won	
Filmfare Awards	21 February 2003	Best Art Direction	Nitin Chandrakant Desai	Won	
Filmfare Awards	21 February 2003	R. D. Burman Award	Shreya Ghoshal	Won	
International Indian Film Academy Awards	15–17 May 2003	Best Film	Devdas	Won	
International Indian Film Academy Awards	15–17 May 2003	Best Director	Sanjay Leela Bhansali	Won	
International Indian Film Academy Awards	15–17 May 2003	Best Actor	Shah Rukh Khan	Won	
International Indian Film Academy Awards	15–17 May 2003	Best Actress	Aishwarya Rai Bachchan	Won	
International Indian Film Academy Awards	15–17 May 2003	Best Actress	Madhuri Dixit	Nominated	
International Indian Film Academy Awards	15–17 May 2003	Best Supporting Actor	Jackie Shroff	Nominated	
International Indian Film Academy Awards	15–17 May 2003	Best Supporting Actress	Kirron Kher	Won	
International Indian Film Academy Awards	15–17 May 2003	Best Lyricist	Nusrat Badr (for "Dola Re Dola")	Won	
International Indian Film Academy Awards	15–17 May 2003	Best Playback Singer – Female	Kavita Krishnamurthy, Shreya Ghoshal (for "Dola Re Dola")	Won	
International Indian Film Academy Awards	15–17 May 2003	Best Song Recording	Bishwadeep Chatterjee, Daman Sood, Tanay Gajjar	Won	
International Indian Film Academy Awards	15–17 May 2003	Best Dialogue	Prakash Ranjit Kapadia	Won	
International Indian Film Academy Awards	15–17 May 2003	Best Cinematography	Binod Pradhan	Won	
International Indian Film Academy Awards	15–17 May 2003	Best Costume Design	Neeta Lulla, Abu Jani, Sandeep Khosla, Reza Shariffi	Won	
International Indian Film Academy Awards	15–17 May 2003	Best Makeup	Arun Pillai	Won	
International Indian Film Academy Awards	15–17 May 2003	Best Sound Re-Recording	Leslie Fernandes	Won	
International Indian Film Academy Awards	15–17 May 2003	Best Art Direction	Nitin Chandrakant Desai	Won	
International Indian Film Academy Awards	15–17 May 2003	Best Choreography	Saroj Khan (for "Dola Re Dola")	Won	
International Indian Film Academy Awards	15–17 May 2003	Best Sound Recording	Jitendra Choudhary, Vikramaditya Motwane, Kushal Sharma	Won	
MTV Asia Awards	24 January 2003	Best Asian Foreign Language Film	Devdas	Won	
National Film Awards	26 July 2003	Best Popular Film Providing Wholesome Entertainment	Devdas	Won	
National Film Awards	26 July 2003	Best Female Playback Singer	Shreya Ghoshal (for "Bairi Piya")	Won	
National Film Awards	26 July 2003	Best Production Design	Nitin Chandrakant Desai	Won	
National Film Awards	26 July 2003	Best Costume Design	Neeta Lulla, Abu Jani, Sandeep Khosla, Reza Shariffi	Won	
National Film Awards	26 July 2003	Best Choreography	Saroj Khan (for "Dola Re Dola")	Won	
Sansui Viewers' Choice Movie Awards	27 March 2003	Best Film	Devdas	Won	
Sansui Viewers' Choice Movie Awards	27 March 2003	Best Director	Sanjay Leela Bhansali	Won	
Sansui Viewers' Choice Movie Awards	27 March 2003	Best Actor	Shah Rukh Khan	Won	
Sansui Viewers' Choice Movie Awards	27 March 2003	Best Actress	Aishwarya Rai Bachchan	Won	
Sansui Viewers' Choice Movie Awards	27 March 2003	Best Actress	Madhuri Dixit	Nominated	
Sansui Viewers' Choice Movie Awards	27 March 2003	Best Supporting Actress	Kirron Kher	Nominated	
Sansui Viewers' Choice Movie Awards	27 March 2003	Best Music Director	Ismail Darbar	Won	
Sansui Viewers' Choice Movie Awards	27 March 2003	Best Lyricist	Nusrat Badr (for "Dola Re Dola")	Nominated	
Sansui Viewers' Choice Movie Awards	27 March 2003	Best Female Playback Singer	Kavita Krishnamurthy, Shreya Ghoshal (for "Dola Re Dola")	Won	
Sansui Viewers' Choice Movie Awards	27 March 2003	Best Female Playback Singer	Kavita Krishnamurthy (for "Maar Daala")	Nominated	
Sansui Viewers' Choice Movie Awards	27 March 2003	Best Choreography	Birju Maharaj (for "Kaahe Chhed")	Nominated	
Sansui Viewers' Choice Movie Awards	27 March 2003	Best Choreography	Saroj Khan (for "Dola Re Dola")	Won	
Sansui Viewers' Choice Movie Awards	27 March 2003	Best Choreography	Vaibhavi Merchant (for "Silsila Ye Chahat Ka")	Nominated	
Sansui Viewers' Choice Movie Awards	27 March 2003	Best Dialogue	Prakash Ranjit Kapadia	Nominated	
Sansui Viewers' Choice Movie Awards	27 March 2003	Best Art Director (Jury)	Nitin Chandrakant Desai	Won	
Screen Awards	16 January 2003	Best Film	Devdas	Won	
Screen Awards	16 January 2003	Best Director	Sanjay Leela Bhansali	Won	
Screen Awards	16 January 2003	Best Actor	Shah Rukh Khan	Won (Note: Tied with Ajay Devgn for Company)	
Screen Awards	16 January 2003	Best Actress	Aishwarya Rai Bachchan	Won	
Screen Awards	16 January 2003	Best Supporting Actress	Madhuri Dixit	Won	
Screen Awards	16 January 2003	Best Supporting Actress	Kirron Kher	Nominated	
Screen Awards	16 January 2003	Best Music Director	Ismail Darbar	Won	
Screen Awards	16 January 2003	Best Lyricist	Nusrat Badr (for "Dola Re Dola")	Nominated	
Screen Awards	16 January 2003	Best Male Playback Singer	Udit Narayan (for "Woh Chand Jaisi Ladki")	Won	
Screen Awards	16 January 2003	Best Female Playback Singer	Kavita Krishnamurthy (for "Maar Daala")	Nominated	
Screen Awards	16 January 2003	Best Female Playback Singer	Shreya Ghoshal (for "Silsila Ye Chahat Ka")	Nominated	
Screen Awards	16 January 2003	Best Cinematography	Binod Pradhan	Won	
Screen Awards	16 January 2003	Best Dialogue	Prakash Ranjit Kapadia	Won	
Screen Awards	16 January 2003	Best Choreography	Birju Maharaj (for "Kaahe Chhed")	Nominated	
Screen Awards	16 January 2003	Best Choreography	Saroj Khan (for "Dola Re Dola")	Won	
Screen Awards	16 January 2003	Best Choreography	Saroj Khan (for "Maar Daala")	Nominated	
Screen Awards	16 January 2003	Best Choreography	Vaibhavi Merchant (for "Silsila Ye Chaahat Ka")	Nominated	
Screen Awards	16 January 2003	Best Art Direction	Nitin Chandrakant Desai	Nominated	
Screen Awards	16 January 2003	Best Background Music	Monty Sharma	Nominated	
Screen Awards	16 January 2003	Best Special Effects	Digital Art Media	Nominated	
Screen Awards	16 January 2003	Best Editing	Bela Sehgal	Nominated	
Zee Cine Awards	11 January 2003	Best Film	Devdas	Won	
Zee Cine Awards	11 January 2003	Best Director	Sanjay Leela Bhansali	Won	
Zee Cine Awards	11 January 2003	Best Actor	Shah Rukh Khan	Won	
Zee Cine Awards	11 January 2003	Best Actress	Aishwarya Rai Bachchan	Won	
Zee Cine Awards	11 January 2003	Best Actress	Madhuri Dixit	Nominated	
Zee Cine Awards	11 January 2003	Best Music Director	Ismail Darbar	Nominated	
Zee Cine Awards	11 January 2003	Best Female Playback Singer	Kavita Krishnamurthy, Shreya Ghoshal (for "Dola Re Dola")	Won	
Zee Cine Awards	11 January 2003	Best Cinematography	Binod Pradhan	Won	
Zee Cine Awards	11 January 2003	Best Choreography	Saroj Khan (for "Dola Re Dola")	Won	
Zee Cine Awards	11 January 2003	Best Costume Design	Neeta Lulla, Abu Jani, Sandeep Khosla, Reza Shariffi	Won	
Zee Cine Awards	11 January 2003	Best Art Direction	Nitin Chandrakant Desai	Nominated	

== See also ==
- List of Bollywood films of 2002
