= List of accolades received by Saathiya (film) =

Saathiya awards and nominations
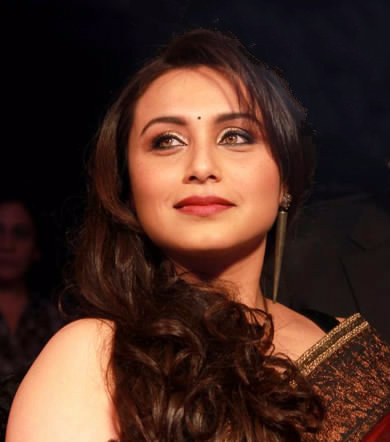
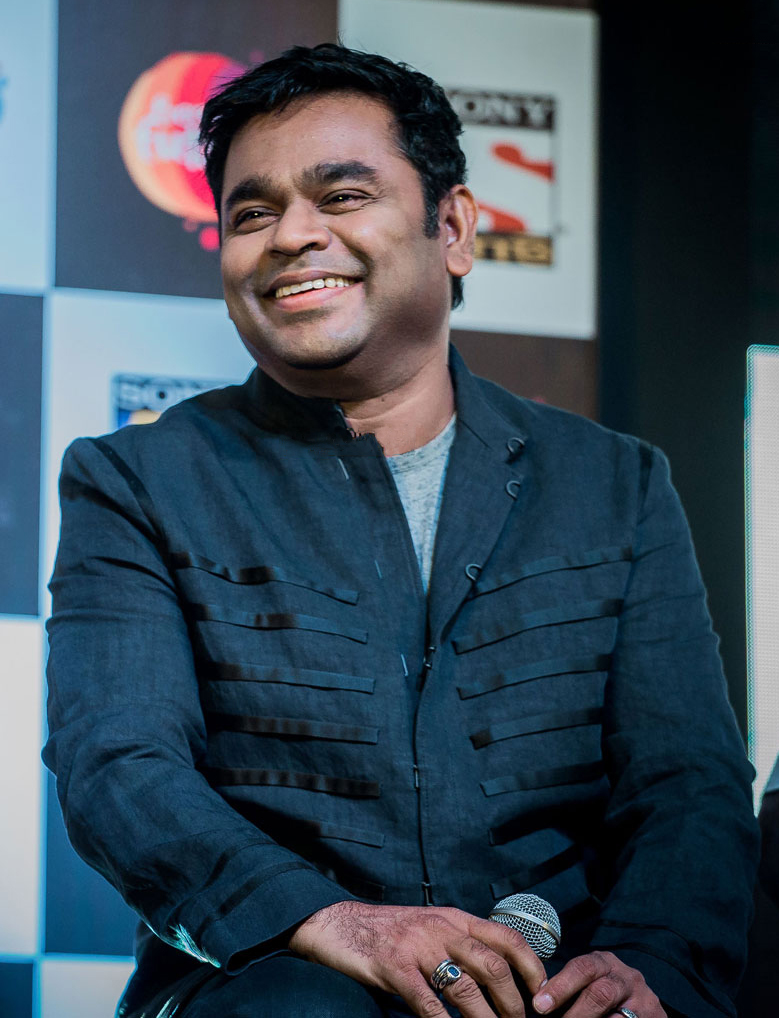
- Rani Mukerji's performance and A. R. Rahman's music garnered them several accolades for Saathiya.
Awards and nominations
Award	Wins	Nominations
Bollywood Movie Awards	2	9
Filmfare Awards	6	8
International Indian Film Academy Awards	3	4
Sansui Viewers' Choice Movie Awards	2	10
Screen Awards	3	13
Zee Cine Awards	4	9

Totals (Note: Certain award groups do not simply award one winner. They acknowledge several different recipients, have runners-up, and have third place. Since this is a specific recognition and is different from losing an award, runner-up mentions are considered wins in this award tally. For simplification and to avoid errors, each award in this list has been presumed to have had a prior nomination.)
- Wins: 22
- Nominations: 55

Saathiya (English: Companion) is a 2002 Indian Hindi-language romantic drama film directed by Shaad Ali and produced by Mani Ratnam and Yash Chopra under the banner of Yash Raj Films. The film stars Rani Mukerji and Vivek Oberoi, with Shah Rukh Khan and Tabu in cameo appearances. It is a remake of the Tamil film Alaipayuthey whose climax was reported to be inspired by the 1998 English film Sliding Doors

The soundtrack was composed by A. R. Rahman and the lyrics are penned by Gulzar. The film was a box office success and became the eight highest-grossing film of the year.

The film received several accolades. At the 48th Filmfare Awards, Saathiya received 8 nominations and won 6 awards, including Best Actress – Critics for Mukherji, Best Screenplay for Ratnam and Best Male Playback Singer for Sonu Nigam for the song "Saathiya". At the 4th IIFA Awards, it received 4 nominations and won 3 awards, including Best Music Director and Best Background Score, both for Rahman. The film also earned three Screen Awards and four Zee Cine Awards.

== Awards and nominations ==
List of accolades received by Saathiya
Award	Date of ceremony (Note: Date is linked to the article about the awards held that year, wherever possible.)	Category	Recipient(s)	Result	Ref.
Anandalok Puraskar Awards	2003	Best Actress (Hindi)	Rani Mukerji	Won	
Bengal Film Journalists' Association Awards	2003	Best Actress (Hindi)	Rani Mukerji	Won	
Bollywood Movie Awards	3 May 2003	Best Actor	Vivek Oberoi	Nominated	
Bollywood Movie Awards	3 May 2003	Best Actress	Rani Mukerji	Nominated	
Bollywood Movie Awards	3 May 2003	Best Actress – Critics	Rani Mukerji	Won	
Bollywood Movie Awards	3 May 2003	Best Music Director	A. R. Rahman	Won	
Bollywood Movie Awards	3 May 2003	Best Playback Singer Male	Sonu Nigam for "Saathiya"	Nominated	
Bollywood Movie Awards	3 May 2003	Best Lyricist	Gulzar for "Chupke Se"	Nominated	
Bollywood Movie Awards	3 May 2003	Best Costume Designer	Manish Malhotra	Nominated	
Bollywood Movie Awards	3 May 2003	Best Story	Mani Ratnam	Nominated	
Bollywood Movie Awards	3 May 2003	Best Screenplay	Mani Ratnam	Nominated	
Filmfare Awards	21 February 2003	Best Actor	Vivek Oberoi	Nominated	
Filmfare Awards	21 February 2003	Best Actress	Rani Mukerji	Nominated	
Filmfare Awards	21 February 2003	Best Actress – Critics (Note: Tied with Manisha Koirala for Company)	Rani Mukerji	Won	
Filmfare Awards	21 February 2003	Best Music Director	A. R. Rahman	Won	
Filmfare Awards	21 February 2003	Best Lyricist	Gulzar for "Saathiya"	Won	
Filmfare Awards	21 February 2003	Best Male Playback Singer	Sonu Nigam for "Saathiya"	Won	
Filmfare Awards	21 February 2003	Best Screenplay	Mani Ratnam	Won	
Filmfare Awards	21 February 2003	Best Dialogue	Gulzar	Won	
International Indian Film Academy Awards	15–17 May 2003	Best Actress	Rani Mukerji	Nominated	
International Indian Film Academy Awards	15–17 May 2003	Best Music Director	A. R. Rahman	Won	
International Indian Film Academy Awards	15–17 May 2003	Best Background Score	A. R. Rahman	Won	
International Indian Film Academy Awards	15–17 May 2003	Best Male Playback Singer	Sonu Nigam for "Saathiya"	Won	
Sansui Viewers' Choice Movie Awards	27 March 2003	Best Actor	Vivek Oberoi	Nominated	
Sansui Viewers' Choice Movie Awards	27 March 2003	Best Promising New Comer – Male	Vivek Oberoi	Won	
Sansui Viewers' Choice Movie Awards	27 March 2003	Best Actress	Rani Mukerji	Nominated	
Sansui Viewers' Choice Movie Awards	27 March 2003	Best Actress – Critics	Rani Mukerji	Won	
Sansui Viewers' Choice Movie Awards	27 March 2003	Best Music Score	A. R. Rahman	Nominated	
Sansui Viewers' Choice Movie Awards	27 March 2003	Best Playback Singer Male	Sonu Nigam for "Saathiya"	Nominated	
Sansui Viewers' Choice Movie Awards	27 March 2003	Best Playback Singer Female	Sadhana Sargam for "Chupke Se"	Nominated	
Sansui Viewers' Choice Movie Awards	27 March 2003	Best Lyricist	Gulzar for "Chupke Se"	Nominated	
Sansui Viewers' Choice Movie Awards	27 March 2003	Best Story	Mani Ratnam	Nominated	
Sansui Viewers' Choice Movie Awards	27 March 2003	Best Dialogue	Gulzar	Nominated	
Screen Awards	16 January 2003	Best Actor	Vivek Oberoi	Nominated	
Screen Awards	16 January 2003	Most Promising Newcomer – Male	Vivek Oberoi	Won	
Screen Awards	16 January 2003	Best Actress	Rani Mukerji	Nominated	
Screen Awards	16 January 2003	Special Jury Award	Rani Mukerji	Won	
Screen Awards	16 January 2003	Best Background Music	A. R. Rahman	Nominated	
Screen Awards	16 January 2003	Best Male Playback	Sonu Nigam for "Saathiya"	Nominated	
Screen Awards	16 January 2003	Best Female Playback	Sadhana Sargam for "Chupke Se"	Won	
Screen Awards	16 January 2003	Best Lyricist	Gulzar for "Chupke Se"	Nominated	
Screen Awards	16 January 2003	Best Story	Mani Ratnam	Nominated	
Screen Awards	16 January 2003	Best Screenplay	Mani Ratnam	Nominated	
Screen Awards	16 January 2003	Best Dialogue	Gulzar	Nominated	
Screen Awards	16 January 2003	Best Sound Design	Robert Taylor	Nominated	
Screen Awards	16 January 2003	Best Art Direction	Chetna Prabhu, Priya Raghunathan	Nominated	
Zee Cine Awards	11 January 2003	Best Actor – Male	Vivek Oberoi	Nominated	
Zee Cine Awards	11 January 2003	Best Actor – Female	Rani Mukerji	Nominated	
Zee Cine Awards	11 January 2003	Best Music Director	A. R. Rahman	Won	
Zee Cine Awards	11 January 2003	Best Playback Singer – Male	Sonu Nigam for "Saathiya"	Won	
Zee Cine Awards	11 January 2003	Best Playback Singer – Female	Sadhana Sargam for "Chupke Se"	Nominated	
Zee Cine Awards	11 January 2003	Best Lyricist	Gulzar for "Saathiya"	Won	
Zee Cine Awards	11 January 2003	Best Story	Mani Ratnam	Nominated	
Zee Cine Awards	11 January 2003	Best Dialogue	Gulzar	Nominated	
Zee Cine Awards	11 January 2003	Best Song Recording	Robert Taylor	Won	
