= Devdas (soundtrack) =

Soundtrack album by Ismail Darbar and Birju Maharaj
- Released: 6 March 2002
- Recorded: 2000–2002
- Length: 52:56
- Language: Hindi
- Label: Universal Music India
- Producer: Bharat Shah

Ismail Darbar chronology
Deewangee (2002)	Devdas (2002)	Desh Devi (2002)

Devdas is the soundtrack of the 2002 Indian Hindi-language film of the same name directed by Sanjay Leela Bhansali. It was released on 6 March 2002 by Universal Music India. The soundtrack, which was developed for two years, contains nine original songs (composed by Ismail Darbar and Birju Maharaj) and one background score (composed by Monty Sharma), with lyrics by Nusrat Badr and Sameer Anjaan. It stars Shah Rukh Khan, Aishwarya Rai Bachchan and Madhuri Dixit.

Shreya Ghoshal made her playback singing debut, following her 2000 meeting with Bhansali at a contest in Sa Re Ga Ma Pa. The composition of Devdas uses several Indian instruments, including basants, dholaks, sarangis, sitars and tablas. The album received positive reviews from music critics, who mostly praised Ghoshal's singing and Darbar's composition. It won several awards, including two National Film Awards and three Filmfare Awards. "Dola Re Dola" and "Maar Dala" are regarded as the best songs from Devdas, being listed as such by several publications. It emerged as the third-highest-selling Bollywood soundtrack album of 2002.

== Background and development ==
The soundtrack was composed by Ismail Darbar, making it his second collaboration with Sanjay Leela Bhansali after Hum Dil De Chuke Sanam (2000), and the lyrics were written by Nusrat Badr, respectively—except for "Kaahe Chhed", composed and written by Birju Maharaj, and "Morey Piya", written by Sameer Anjaan. Monty Sharma finished the background score. The vocals were performed by Madhuri Dixit, Jaspinder Narula, Kavita Krishnamurthy, KK, Maharaj, Raghav Chatterjee, Rashmi Sharma, Shreya Ghoshal, Supriya Adhikari, Udit Narayan and Vinod Rathod. Maharaj, Saroj Khan, Vaibhavi Merchant and the duo Pappu–Malu were the choreographers. Devdas was directed by Bhansali and produced by Bharat Shah under his banner, Mega Bollywood. It stars Shah Rukh Khan, Aishwarya Rai Bachchan and Dixit, while Kirron Kher, Smita Jaykar and Vijayendra Ghatge play supporting roles. The film was released in theatres worldwide on 12 July 2002, proved to be a commercial success, and received mixed response from critics.

"I just couldn't get the mood of the song right. And after some takes, I started crying. But Ismailji and Sanjay uncle were very encouraging and told me I could do it. Their faith in me did the trick, and after that I got the song just right. After the recording, Bhansaliji and Ismailji said since I do a better job after I cry, they would make me cry [every time] before the recording."

— Ghoshal on the recording of "Silsila Ye Chahat Ka"

While the composing of Hum Dil De Chuke Sanam required Darbar to do much research, he wanted to create the music for Devdas "straight from the heart". He decided to not listen to the earlier remakes' soundtracks, as he did not want to be influenced; however, after it was 80 percent completed, he finally got chances to listen to the last 20 minutes of Bimal Roy's 1955 version's music. Darbar called the film's soundtrack "not even 5 [percent] of Bhansali's interpretation" and said he "wanted the music to match these heights without bothering if it had the required Bengali flavor. But I did use a classical base and the Baul of Bengal." Mehboob Kotwal was the first choice for the lyricist. However, because of a conflict between him and Darbar, Badr replaced Kotwal on his debut as a lyricist. Anjaan wrote the lyrics for the song "Morey Piya" only.

Ghoshal made her Bollywood playback singing debut through Devdas, with "Bairi Piya" being the first song she recorded. She first met Bhansali on 9 March 2000, while she participated in a contest from a children's episode of the musical game show Sa Re Ga Ma Pa. He was impressed by Ghoshal after she won the contest, asking her to move to Mumbai so she could pursue her playback career; she subsequently moved with her family from Kota, Rajasthan. Both Darbar and Bhansali offered Ghoshal the opportunity to be the voice of Rai Bachchan's character Paro; according to them, her voice had the innocence needed for the character. She said, "When I sang, I imagined myself to be Paro. Just like Aishwarya. I tried to bring in the Paro's pain, confidence and innocence." Darbar suggested Bhansali use Dixit's vocals for the song "Kaahe Chhed", although he was initially uncertain about Maharaj's opinion. Each song—which all had to be mixed for eight or nine times each—was recorded in 10 days. Basants, dholaks, sarangis, sitars and tablas were used in the compositions. The development was completed after two years.

== Release ==
The soundtrack album, which was highly anticipated at the time, has nine original songs and one background score. Newspapers reported that it had been considered as "Bollywood's best music album ever" prior to release on 2 April 2002 by Universal Music India. The Vice President of Universal Music India Vinay Sapru refused to confirm the music rights' purchasing cost, but the press said that the label had given an advance of more than ₹100 million (US$1.0 million). (Note: In an interview with Bharati Dubey of Rediff.com, the producer and financier Bharat Shah said that he earned ₹130 million (US$1.3 million). However, according to another Rediff.com report, it was revealed that he only received ₹120 million (US$1.2 million), which was also reported by The Tribune and supported by Shah's son Rashesh.) Upon release, Devdas emerged as the third-highest-selling Bollywood soundtrack of 2002, with between 1.8 million and 2 million sales. According to Rediff.com, 5.000 units had been sold on the then-defunct e-commerce Fabmart itself. Sapru stated, "Usually, 70 per cent of the gross sales of any album comes only after the release of the film, subject to its success, of course. If the film flops, sales plummet on the opening day itself. But with Devdas, we surely have a winner." Nonetheless, The Hindu reported Universal Music India only recovered a quarter of the cost.

Chitralekha magazine featured the soundtrack in their listing of the "Top Five Hindi Film Albums" of 2002. It debuted at the second position on the Screen magazine chart of top Hindi film albums in their 19 April 2002 issue, and peaked the first position from 3 May to 24 May. The song "Maar Dala" entered the top 10 most-listened songs chart by Raaga.com, peaking at the third position. Rajeev Chaurasia, the associate director of the television channel MTV India, was appreciative of the soundtrack and described Ghoshal's rendition from "Bairi Piya" as "brilliant". The channel managed music airplay and special shows for Devdas—featuring the film's behind-the-scenes, interviews of Bhansali and meet-and-greets with Shah Rukh Khan—through June and July 2002. On 10 July, Rediff.com published that the soundtrack had topped its charts for 14 consecutive weeks.

== Critical reception ==
The album was met with generally positive reviews from music critics. Aniket Joshi of Planet Bollywood gave the album nine-and-a-half stars and stated that it is "such a [rare] album" which has "perfectly-sung songs". The critic felt that the song "Dola Re Dola" is "a highlight on screen" as the "singing was very good", and compared it to the song "Nimbooda Nimbooda" from Hum Dil De Chuke Sanam. Writing for India Today, S. Sahaya Ranjit singled out Ghoshal's "tuneful voice", especially in the song "Silsila Ye Chahat Ka" and concluded, "In an age when film music is heavily westernised, the use of Indian instruments [...] is pleasing. Apart from the voices, the rich choral accompaniment is prominent. A sheer delight for classical music buffs." Rediff.com's Sukanya Verma noted that the soundtrack's "old world charm, classical connotations and complex melody makes it exquisite", speaking of how the songs are "like a good bouquet. They mature with time. And though at first may not catch your fancy, they grow on you."

In a review published by the BBC, Shamaila Khan rated Devdas nine-out-of-ten stars, writing that it "has the same classical touches that Darbar's last album did". She declared "Mara Daala" to be her favourite song on the album, describing its lyrics as "dispirited". Joginder Tuteja of Bollywood Hungama opined that Darbar's compositions and Badr's lyrics are "classical-based" and "very rich", respectively, while adding that the former does "a commendable job". Kavita Awasathi from B4U, who gave a rating of four stars, shared similar thoughts of Darbar, with her elaborating that he "has once again weaved magic [and] done an admirable job here". Biswadeep Ghosh of Outlook observed that he "has shed all inhibitions and come up with some really divine music". A review carried by The Hindu said, "Ismail Durbar has made attempts to blend classical music into his tunes. But because of his dependence on and usage of familiar tunes, the music lacks the freshness." The anonymous critic hailed that Ghoshal proves her versatility in "Silsila Ye Chahat Ka", which the critic found to be "a straight lift" from "Ghanan Ghanan" of Lagaan (2001).

In their four-star review, a writer of Chitralekha saw that the soundtrack has "rich classical base" and declared it as the "absolute winner". Khalid Mohamed, however, believed "[Darbar's] music is not a patch on his score for Hum Dil De Chuke Sanam". The New Sunday Express' film critic Baradwaj Rangan found "[t]he 'Bairi Piya' picturisation alone shows more about the Devdas–Paro relationship—his arrogance and temper, her deference and penchant for teasing him—than reams of exposition would have." Siddharth Patankar of NDTV referred to the soundtrack as "scintillating, melodious and pleasing", and added: "The singers have done justice to their songs, with Kavita [Krishamurthy] leading the pack and newcomer Shreya Ghosal [...] impresses too [...] Most of the songs are quite simply—great." Paresh C. Palicha, reviewing for The Hindu, wrote that it "deserve a special mention" and said that Badr "gives a true musical feel". A third review from the publication written by Sriram Krishna M. complimented Badr's "rich" lyrics.

== Awards and nominations ==
Award	Category	Recipient(s)	Result	Ref.
Bollywood Movie Awards	Best Music Director	Ismail Darbar	Nominated	
Bollywood Movie Awards	Best Lyricist	Nusrat Badr (for "Dola Re Dola")	Nominated	
Bollywood Movie Awards	Best Playback Singer – Female	Kavita Krishnamurthy (for "Maar Dala")	Nominated	
Bollywood Movie Awards	Best Playback Singer – Female	Shreya Ghoshal (for "Bairi Piya")	Nominated	
Bollywood Movie Awards	Best Choreography	Saroj Khan (for "Dola Re Dola")	Won	
Bollywood Music Awards	Best Music Director	Ismail Darbar	Won	
Bollywood Music Awards	Best Songs	"Dola Re Dola"	Won	
Bollywood Music Awards	New Talent of the Year	Shreya Ghoshal	Won	
Filmfare Awards	Best Music Director	Ismail Darbar	Nominated	
Filmfare Awards	Best Lyricist	Nusrat Badr (for "Dola Re Dola")	Nominated	
Filmfare Awards	Best Playback Singer – Female	Kavita Krishnamurthy, Shreya Ghoshal (for "Dola Re Dola")	Won	
Filmfare Awards	Best Playback Singer – Female	Kavita Krishnamurthy (for "Maar Dala")	Nominated	
Filmfare Awards	Best Playback Singer – Female	Shreya Ghoshal (for "Bairi Piya")	Nominated	
Filmfare Awards	Best Choreography	Saroj Khan (for "Dola Re Dola")	Won	
Filmfare Awards	R. D. Burman Award for Best New Musical Talent	Shreya Ghoshal	Won	
International Indian Film Academy Awards	Best Lyricist	Nusrat Badr (for "Dola Re Dola")	Won	
International Indian Film Academy Awards	Best Female Playback Singer	Kavita Krishnamurthy, Shreya Ghoshal (for "Dola Re Dola")	Won	
International Indian Film Academy Awards	Best Choreography	Saroj Khan (for "Dola Re Dola")	Won	
National Film Awards	Best Female Playback Singer	Shreya Ghoshal (for "Bairi Piya")	Won	
National Film Awards	Best Choreography	Saroj Khan (for "Dola Re Dola")	Won	
V. Shantaram Awards (Note: Also known as the Rajkamal Academy of Cinematic Excellence (RACE) National Awards.)	Best Music Director	Ismail Darbar	Won	
V. Shantaram Awards	Best Choreography	Saroj Khan (for "Dola Re Dola")	Won	
Sansui Viewer's Choice Movie Awards	Best Music Director	Ismail Darbar	Won	
Sansui Viewer's Choice Movie Awards	Best Lyrics	Nusrat Badr (for "Dola Re Dola")	Nominated	
Sansui Viewer's Choice Movie Awards	Best Playback Singer – Female	Kavita Krishnamurthy (for "Maar Dala")	Nominated	
Sansui Viewer's Choice Movie Awards	Best Playback Singer – Female	Kavita Krishnamurthy, Shreya Ghoshal (for "Dola Re Dola")	Nominated	
Sansui Viewer's Choice Movie Awards	Best Choreography	Birju Maharaj (for "Kaahe Chhed")	Nominated	
Sansui Viewer's Choice Movie Awards	Best Choreography	Saroj Khan (for "Dola Re Dola")	Nominated	
Sansui Viewer's Choice Movie Awards	Best Choreography	Vaibhavi Merchant (for "Silsila Ye Chahat Ka")	Nominated	
Screen Awards	Best Music Director	Ismail Darbar	Won	
Screen Awards	Best Lyricist	Nusrat Badr (for "Dola Re Dola")	Nominated	
Screen Awards	Best Playback – Male	Udit Narayan (for "Woh Chand Jaisi Ladki")	Nominated	
Screen Awards	Best Playback – Female	Kavita Krishnamurthy (for "Maar Dala")	Nominated	
Screen Awards	Best Playback – Female	Shreya Ghoshal (for "Silsila Ye Chahat Ka")	Nominated	
Screen Awards	Best Choreography	Saroj Khan (for "Dola Re Dola")	Won	
Screen Awards	Best Choreography	Birju Maharaj (for "Kaahe Chhed")	Nominated	
Screen Awards	Best Choreography	Saroj Khan (for "Maar Dala")	Nominated	
Screen Awards	Best Choreography	Vaibhavi Merchant (for "Silsila Ye Chahat Ka")	Nominated	
Screen Awards	Best Background Music	Monty Sharma	Nominated	
Zee Cine Awards	Best Music Director	Ismail Darbar	Nominated	
Zee Cine Awards	Best Playback Singer – Female	Kavita Krishnamurthy, Shreya Ghoshal (for "Dola Re Dola")	Won	
Zee Cine Awards	Best Choreography	Saroj Khan (for "Dola Re Dola")	Won	

== Legacy ==
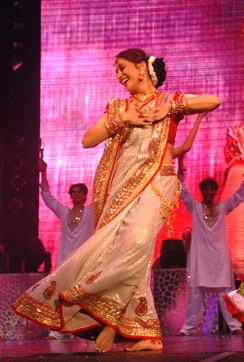
Madhuri Dixit performing the "Dola Re Dola" song at the 2008 Unforgettable Tour

Following the success of Devdas, Ghoshal would go on to become one of the most popular playback singers. Believing that it has changed her life, she recalled, "I consider myself very lucky that Sanjay uncle came into my life and give me such a big break." She won the National Film Award and the Filmfare Award for Best Female Playback Singer for "Bairi Piya" and "Dola Re Dola", respectively. Additionally, she was awarded with the IIFA and Zee Cine awards in the same category. Meanwhile, the song "Dola Re Dola" has been regarded as one of the best works in Saroj Khan's career as a choreographer and won her a first Best Choreography trophy at the National Film Awards. In an interview with Mumbai Mirror in 2012, she was quoted as saying that:

"... the Dola Re number in Devdas was the toughest. Choreographing two leading heroines for the same dance was a challenge. Madhuri Dixit and Aishwarya Rai are both brilliant dancers and I couldn't let either of them feel that they did not have good steps."

Rai Bachchan and Dixit performed "Dola Re Dola" at the Unforgettable Tour in 2008 and critics commended them; Jon Caramanica from The New York Times called it "one of the night's most stirring", with Nicky Loomis of the Los Angeles Times adding that they had performed "some of the most graceful traditional Indian-style moves of the evening".

In 2004, the album was considered to be one of "best music in film" by Sight & Sound. In 2005, it was judged the top Hindi soundtrack of all time by voters on the BBC, and in 2014, they included the song "Maar Daala" in their listing of the "100 Greatest Bollywood Song of All Time". In 2011, Planet Bollywood featured Devdas amongst the "100 Greatest Bollywood Soundtracks Ever" of Hindi cinema. "Dola Re Dola" has been listed three times as "the best Bollywood dance number of all time": by Scroll.in in 2016, the Eastern Eye in 2018, and Time Out in 2019. HuffPost's Tatsam Mukherjee added the album in his 2020 listing of the "Top 20 Bollywood Albums since 2000".

== Track listing ==
Devdas (Original Motion Picture Soundtrack)
No.	Title	Lyrics	Music	Singer(s)	Length
1.	"Silsila Ye Chahat Ka"	Nusrat Badr	Ismail Darbar	Shreya Ghoshal	5:26
2.	"Kaahe Chhed"	Birju Maharaj	Birju Maharaj	Birju Maharaj, Kavita Krishnamurthy, Madhuri Dixit	5:23
3.	"Bairi Piya"	Nusrat Badr	Ismail Darbar	Udit Narayan, Shreya Ghoshal	5:23
4.	"Maar Daala"	Nusrat Badr	Ismail Darbar	Kavita Krishnamurthy, KK	4:40
5.	"Chalak Chalak"	Nusrat Badr	Ismail Darbar	Udit Narayan, Vinod Rathod, Shreya Ghoshal	5:12
6.	"Hamesha Tumko Chaha"	Nusrat Badr	Ismail Darbar	Kavita Krishnamurthy, Udit Narayan	6:02
7.	"Woh Chand Jaisi Ladki"	Nusrat Badr	Ismail Darbar	Udit Narayan	4:32
8.	"Morey Piya"	Sameer Anjaan	Ismail Darbar	Jaspinder Narula, Shreya Ghoshal	5:40
9.	"Dev's Last Journey" (Background score)	Nusrat Badr	Monty Sharma	Raghab Chatterjee, Supriya Adhikari, Rashmi Sharma	4:03
10.	"Dola Re Dola"	Nusrat Badr	Ismail Darbar	Kavita Krishnamurthy, Shreya Ghoshal, KK	6:35
Total length:					52:56
