= 4th IIFA Awards =

Indian film award ceremony in 2003

- Date: 17 May 2003
- Site: Coca-Cola Dome, Johannesburg, South Africa
- Hosted by: Anil Kapoor and Dia Mirza

Highlights
- Best Picture: Devdas
- Best Direction: Sanjay Leela Bhansali (Devdas)
- Best Actor: Shah Rukh Khan (Devdas)
- Best Actress: Aishwarya Rai (Devdas)
- Most awards: Devdas (16)
- Most nominations: Devdas (18)

The 2003 IIFA Awards, officially known as the 4th International Indian Film Academy Awards ceremony, presented by the International Indian Film Academy honoured the best films of 2002 and took place on 17 May 2003.

The official ceremony took place on 6 April 2002, at the Coca-Cola Dome, in Johannesburg. During the ceremony, IIFA Awards were awarded in 29 competitive categories.

Devdas led the ceremony with 5 nominations, and won a leading 16 awards, including Best Film, Best Director (for Sanjay Leela Bhansali), Best Actor (for Shah Rukh Khan), Best Actress (for Aishwarya Rai), and Best Supporting Actress (for Kirron Kher), thus becoming the most-awarded film at the ceremony.

Ajay Devgan received dual nominations for Best Actor for his performances in Company and The Legend of Bhagat Singh, but lost to Shah Rukh Khan won the award for Devdas.

== Winners and nominees ==
Winners are listed first and highlighted in boldface.

=== Popular awards ===
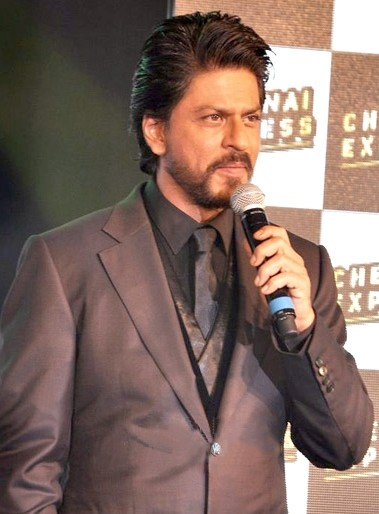
Shahrukh Khan (Best Actor)

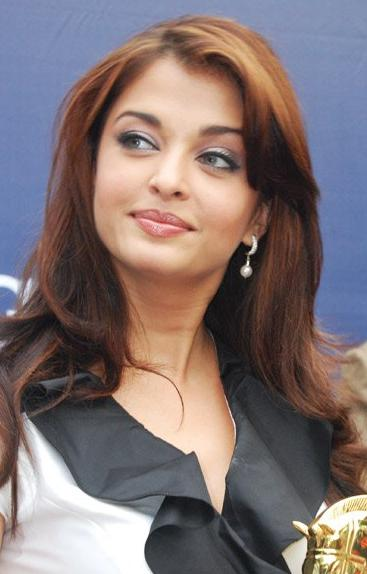
Aishwarya Rai (Best Actress)

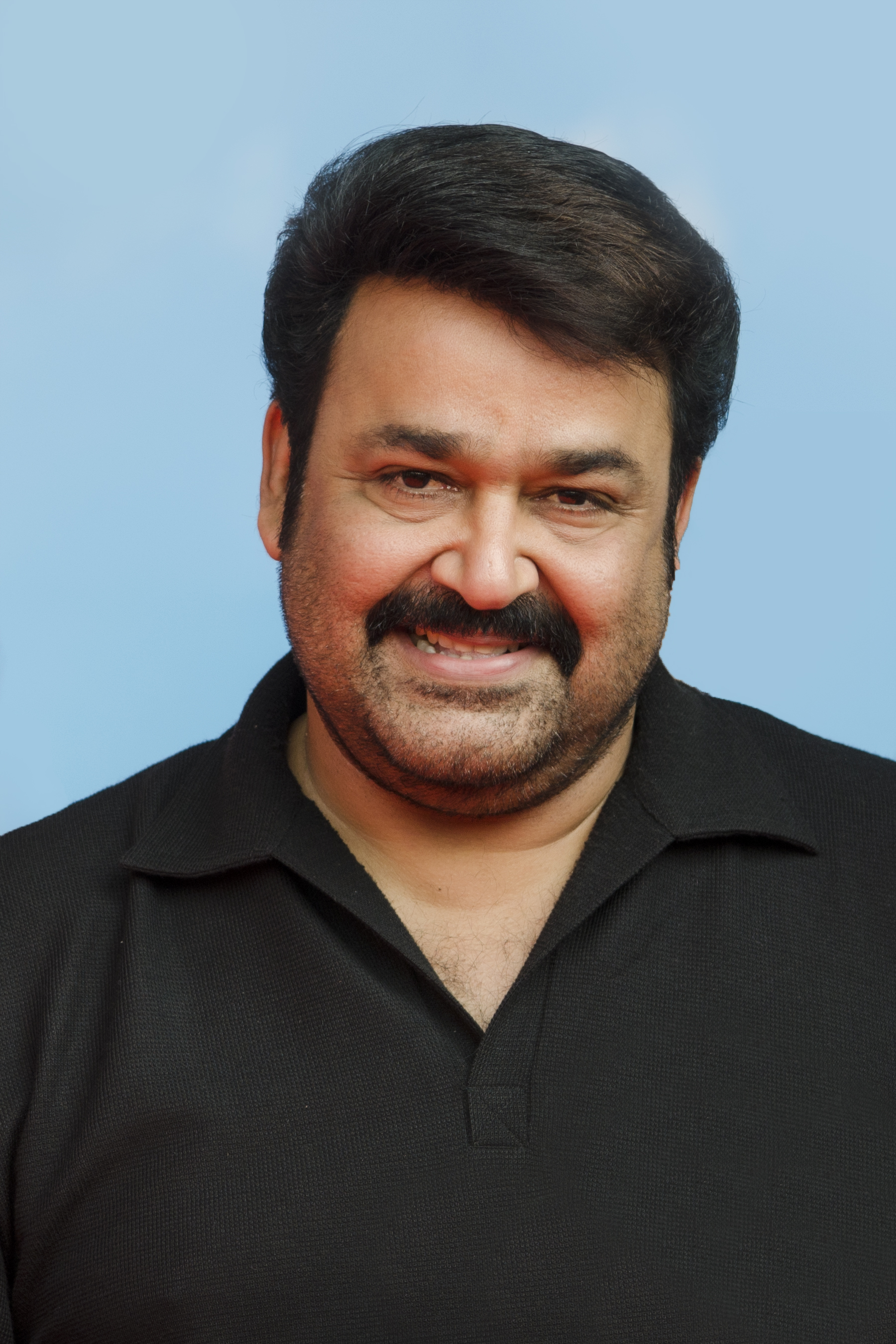
Mohanlal (Best Supporting Actor)

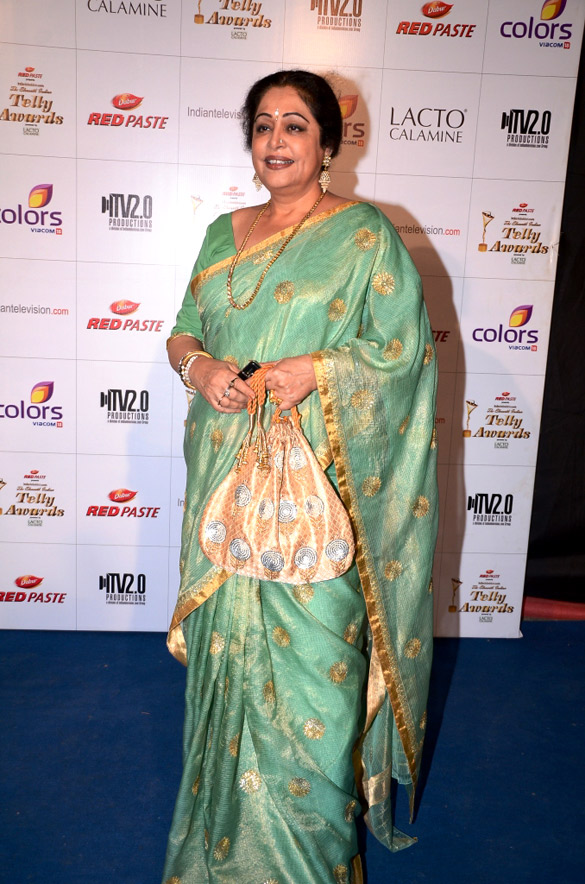
Kirron Kher (Best Supporting Actress)

Best Picture	Best Director
**Devdas**	**Sanjay Leela Bhansali – Devdas**
Best Performance In A Leading Role Male	Best Performance In A Leading Role Female
**Shah Rukh Khan – Devdas as Devdas Mukherjee**; Ajay Devgan – Company as Malik; Ajay Devgan – The Legend of Bhagat Singh as Bhagat Singh; Amitabh Bachchan – Kaante as Yashvardhan Rampal 'Major'; Akshaye Khanna – Deewangee as Raj Goyal	**Aishwarya Rai – Devdas as Parvati "Paro" Chakraborty**; Ameesha Patel – Humraaz as Priya; Karisma Kapoor – Shakti: The Power as Nandini; Madhuri Dixit – Devdas as Chandramukhi; Rani Mukerji – Saathiya as Suhani Sharma
Best Performance In A Supporting Role Male	Best Performance In A Supporting Role Female
**Mohanlal – Company as Srinivasan**; Ashutosh Rana – Raaz as Agni Swaroop; Dilip Prabhavalkar – Encounter: The Killing as Ponappa Awadhe; Jackie Shroff – Devdas as Chunnilal; Sushant Singh – The Legend of Bhagat Singh as Sukhdev	**Kirron Kher – Devdas as Sumitra Chakraborty**; Kareena Kapoor – Mujhse Dosti Karoge as Tina
Best Performance In A Comic Role	Best Performance In A Negative Role
**Mahesh Manjrekar – Kaante**	**Akshaye Khanna – Humraaz**
Male Debutant Star	Female Debutant Star
**John Abraham – Jism**	**Esha Deol – Koi Mere Dil Se Poochhe**

=== Musical awards ===
Best Music Director	Best Lyrics
**A. R. Rahman – Saathiya**	**"Dola Re Dola" from Devdas – Nusrat Badr**
Best Male Playback Singer	Best Female Playback Singer
**Sonu Nigam for "Saathiya" – Saathiya**	**Shreya Ghoshal and Kavita Krishnamurthy for "Dola Re Dola" – Devdas**
Best Song Recording	Best Background score
**Devdas – Bishwadeep Chatterjee, Daman Sood, Tanay Gajjar**	**Saathiya** **– A. R. Rahman**

=== Backstage awards ===
Best Dialogue	Best Screenplay
**Prakash Kapadia for Devdas**	**Mahesh Bhatt for Raaz**
Best Story
**Jaideep Sahni for Company**

=== Technical awards ===
Best Cinematography	Best Choreography
**Binod Pradhan – Devdas**	**Saroj Khan – Devdas**
Best Costume Design	Best Editing
**Devdas – Neeta Lulla, Abu Jani, Sandeep Khosla, Reza Shariffi**	**Company – Chandan Arora**
Best Makeup	Best Sound Recording
**Devdas – Arun Pillai**	**Devdas – Jitendra Chaudhary, Vikramaditya Motwane, Kunal Sharma**
Best Sound Re-Recording	Best Special Effects
**Devdas – Leslie Fernandes**	**Kaante – Prime Focus**
Best Art Direction	Best Action
**Devdas – Nitin Chandrakant Desai**	**Company – Allan Amin**

=== Special awards ===
==== Outstanding Contribution to Indian Cinema ====
- Kalyanji Virji Shah, Anandji Virji Shah and Dev Anand

==== Outstanding Achievement in International Cinema ====
- Aparna Sen

==== Outstanding Achievement by an Indian in South Africa ====
- Ajay Gupta – MD, Sahara Computers, SA

==== Samsung Style Diva of the Year ====
- Rekha

==== Samsung Style Icon of the Year ====
- Fardeen Khan

==== Fresh Faces Of The Year ====
- John Abraham
- Esha Deol

== Superlatives ==
Films with multiple nominations
Nominations	Film
5	Devdas
2	Company
2	The Legend of Bhagat Singh

Films with multiple awards
Awards	Film
16	Devdas
4	Company
4	Saathiya
2	Kaante
