= Black (soundtrack) =

Black (Original Soundtrack)

Soundtrack album by Monty Sharma
- Released: 10 February 2005
- Recorded: 2004
- Genre: Feature film soundtrack
- Length: 49:02
- Language: Hindi
- Label: YRF Music

Monty Sharma chronology
Devdas (2002)	Black (Original Soundtrack) (2005)	Lucky: No Time for Love (2005)

Black (Original Soundtrack) is the soundtrack album to the 2005 film of the same name directed by Sanjay Leela Bhansali and starring Amitabh Bachchan and Rani Mukerji. The album consisted of thirty-three tracks composed by Monty Sharma with one song contained lyrics by Prasoon Joshi and sung by Gayatri Iyer. The soundtrack was released under the YRF Music label on 10 February 2005. The score met with widespread acclaim and Sharma received accolades for his work.

== Background ==
In October 2003, an article written by Savita Gautham of The Hindu reported that A. R. Rahman would compose the music for Black. However, Monty Sharma, who previously worked with Bhansali on Devdas (2002), replaced him for an unknown reason. Unlike Bhansali's previous films, Black did not contain many musical numbers, hence the background score served a significant importance to the storyline. Sharma recalled that he followed his grandfather Ram Prasad Sharma's teachings "to first recognise the known emotions within a situation and then try to see how those emotions can be taken into a different sphere through the music." For Mukerji's sequences, Monty Sharma used the low-octave sound from strings and pianos to create uplifting auras. While for Bachchan's, he used the Armenian instrument duduk.

The only musical number featured in the film was titled "Haan Maine Chukar Dekha Hai", written by Prasoon Joshi and performed by Gayatri Iyer. Iyer confessed that she loved every moment of recording the song, adding: "It is not often that one gets to work in such a relaxed environment with so much focus on the artistic integrity of the piece. The focus was on feeling the emotional truth of the song."

== Release ==
The soundtrack in its entirety consisted of thirty-three songs, that included the musical number "Haan Maine Chukar Dekha Hai" and the remainder accompanied Sharma's instrumental tracks. The album was released on iTunes on 10 February 2005, six days after the film's release, by Yash Raj Films' subsidiary YRF Music.

== Reception ==
The soundtrack album was positively reviewed by several critics. Joginder Tuteja of Bollywood Hungama, who gave a three-out-of-five-stars rating, was impressed by "Haan Maine Chukar Dekha Hai", writing, "The song is one of the best soft tracks in recent times and it's a pity that neither has it been publicized nor has been placed in the movie." He also completed the background music being of "international standards" and called it as "the most touching theme music ever for a Hindi movie."

Planet Bollywood's reviewer Shruti Bhasin also praised the song, and took note of the lyrics, saying that Joshi "works his magic" in it. For the instrumental tracks, Bhasin noted the diverse variety and appeal being different from conventional film music, recommending it to listeners "who love hearing diversified instrumental pieces". Screen asserted, "In the film, the music merged so seamlessly with the narrative that it went unnoticed amidst the solid content. Luckily, we get to enjoy it unalloyed here."

Jaspreet Pandohar of BBC and Shruti Gupta of NDTV described the score as a "haunting" and "moving". Rediff.com-based critic Sita Menon, though deemed Sharma's background score being "otherwise good", she felt that "every high and low wasn't accompanied by a blistering crescendo".

== Track listing ==
Black (Original Soundtrack) track listing
No.	Title	Length
1.	"Michelle's Theme" (instrumental)	1:39
2.	"Haan Maine Chukar Dekha Hai"	6:43
3.	"B.L.A.C.K." (instrumental)	1:41
4.	"Debraj's Theme" (instrumental)	2:54
5.	"A World of Shadows" (instrumental)	1:42
6.	"Signs" (instrumental)	1:03
7.	"Just Shifting Rooms" (instrumental)	1:04
8.	"The Bulb Is Dying" (instrumental)	1:29
9.	"An Unending Darkness" (instrumental)	1:37
10.	"Michelle's First Day at School" (instrumental)	1:27
11.	"A Ray of Light" (instrumental)	3:29
12.	"W.A.T.E.R." (instrumental)	1:18
13.	"A Teacher's Miracle" (instrumental)	1:10
14.	"Fade Out" (instrumental)	1:13
15.	"Jazz" (instrumental)	1:58
16.	"50 Steps" (instrumental)	2:22
17.	"Mama I Failed" (instrumental)	1:09
18.	"The First Touch" (instrumental)	1:36
19.	"The Bride's Maid" (instrumental)	3:20
20.	"L.I.G.H.T." (instrumental)	2:38
21.	"The Colour of Achievement" (instrumental)	1:05
22.	"A Student's Miracle" (instrumental)	3:38
23.	"Divine Light" (instrumental)	2:47
Total length:		49:02

== Awards and nominations ==
List of accolades received by Black
Award	Date of ceremony (Note: The date is linked to the article about the awards held that year, wherever possible)	Category	Recipient(s)	Result	Ref(s)
Bollywood Movie Awards	10 June 2006	Best Lyricist	Prasoon Joshi	Nominated	
Filmfare Awards	25 February 2006	Best Background Score	Monty Sharma	Won	
International Indian Film Academy Awards	15–17 June 2006	Best Background Score	Monty Sharma	Won	
Screen Awards	11 January 2006	Best Background Score	Monty Sharma	Won	
Zee Cine Awards	4 March 2006	Best Background Score	Monty Sharma	Won	
