= Sansui Viewers' Choice Movie Awards =

Annual film awards in India

The Sansui Viewers' Choice Movie Awards were a set of awards presented annually by the Pritish Nandy Communications, a company owned by the journalist and politician Pritish Nandy, and aired on Star India. The function was started in 1998.

== Winners and nominees ==
=== 2003 ===
The winners and nominees have been listed below:

| Best Film: Devdas‡; Company; Kaante; Raaz; The Legend of Bhagat Singh | Best Director: Sanjay Leela Bhansali – Devdas‡; Abbas–Mustan – Humraaz; Ram Gopal Varma – Company; Rajkumar Santoshi – The Legend of Bhagat Singh; Vikram Bhatt – Raaz |
| Best Actor: Shah Rukh Khan – Devdas as Devdas‡; Ajay Devgn – Company as Mallik; Ajay Devgn – The Legend of Bhagat Singh as Bhagat Singh; Amitabh Bachchan – Kaante as Yashvardhan; Vivek Oberoi – Saathiya as Aditya | Best Actress: Aishwarya Rai Bachchan – Devdas as Paro‡; Amisha Patel – Humraaz as Priya; Karisma Kapoor – Shakti as Nandini; Madhuri Dixit – Devdas as Chandramukhi; Rani Mukerji – Saathiya as Suhani |
