= Debojit (EP) =

EP by Debojit Saha
- Released: 28 April 2006
- Recorded: 2006
- Genre: Pop, Hindi, Filmi
- Label: Saregama

Debojit Saha chronology
Debojit (2006)	Swapno Sajiye (2007)

Debojit is an debut EP by Sa Re Ga Ma Pa Challenge 2005 winner Debojit Saha. The songs were composed by Biddu, Ismail Darbar, and Annujj Kappoo.

== Track listing ==
Original Track listing
No.	Title	Lyrics	Music	Length
1.	"Jeena" (My Heart Goes Duma Duma)	Sameer	Biddu	4:38
2.	"Teri Dua Se"	Sameer	Biddu	5:36
3.	"Tu Dil Hai Mera"	Mehboob	Ismail Darbar	6:27
4.	"Tu Meri Arzoo"	Sameer	Biddu	4:21
5.	"Aaj Nahi To Kal"	Sameer	Annujj Kapoor	6:42
6.	"Jeena" (Unplugged)	Sameer	Biddu	5:06
Total length:				32:41

Remix Track listing
No.	Title	Lyrics	Music	Length
7.	"Ek Haseena Thi (Note: These remix tracks are not available in a digital streaming release, only a physical release.)"	Anand Bakshi	Laxmikant Pyarelal
8.	"O Humdum Soniyo Re"	Gulzar	A.R. Rahman
