= 48th Filmfare Awards =

2003 awards for Hindi cinema

- Date: 21 February 2003
- Hosted by: Shahrukh Khan and Saif Ali Khan
- Official website: www.filmfare.com

Highlights
- Best Film: Devdas
- Critics Award for Best Film: The Legend of Bhagat Singh
- Most awards: Devdas (11)
- Most nominations: Devdas (17)

Television coverage
- Network: Sony Entertainment Television (India)

The 48th Filmfare Awards were held in Mumbai on 21 February 2003.

The ceremony was dominated by Devdas, which received a leading 17 nominations and 11 wins – a record at the time – including Best Film, Best Director (Sanjay Leela Bhansali), Best Actor (Shah Rukh Khan), Best Actress (Aishwarya Rai) and Best Supporting Actress (Madhuri Dixit).

== Awards ==
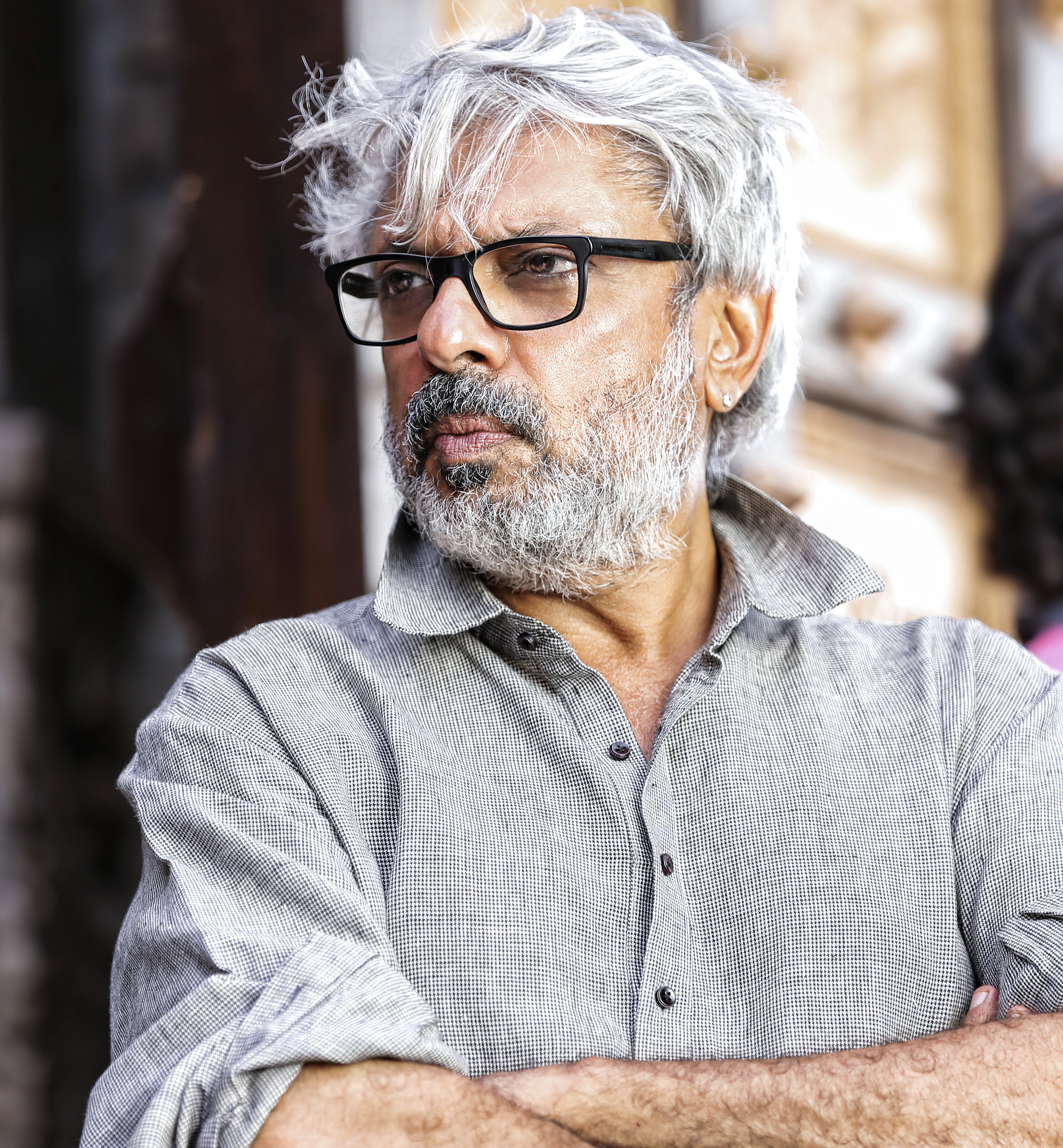
Sanjay Leela Bhansali — Best Director winner

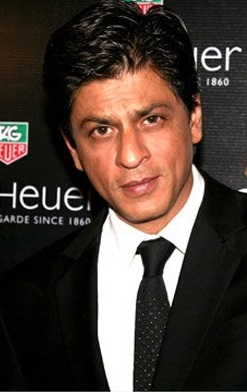
Shah Rukh Khan — Best Actor winner

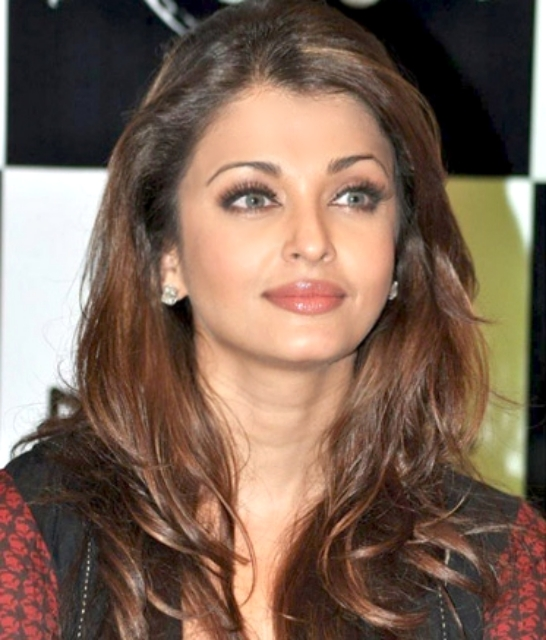
Aishwarya Rai Bachchan — Best Actress winner

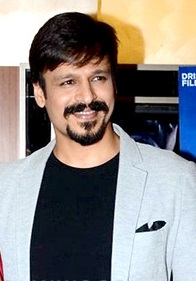
Vivek Oberoi — Best Supporting Actor winner

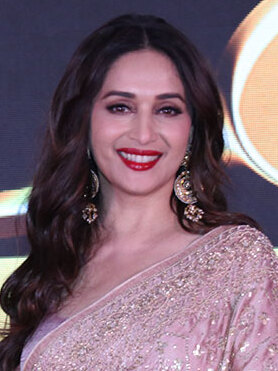
Madhuri Dixit — Best Supporting Actress winner

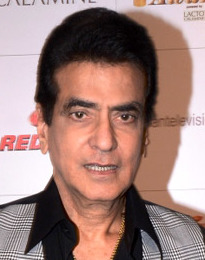
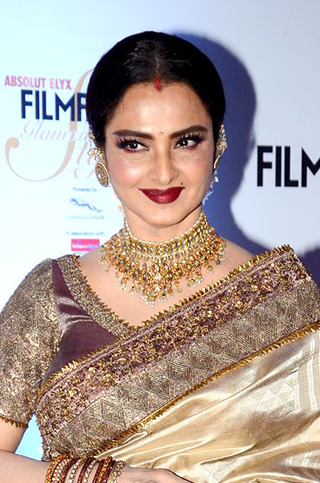
Jeetendra and Rekha, Lifetime Achievement Awardees

=== Main Awards ===
Best Film	Best Director
Devdas; Company; Humraaz; Kaante; Raaz	Sanjay Leela Bhansali – Devdas; Abbas–Mustan – Humraaz; Ram Gopal Verma – Company; Sanjay Gupta – Kaante; Vikram Bhatt – Raaz
Best Actor	Best Actress
Shah Rukh Khan – Devdas; Ajay Devgn – Company; Amitabh Bachchan – Kaante; Bobby Deol – Humraaz; Vivek Oberoi – Saathiya	Aishwarya Rai – Devdas; Ameesha Patel – Humraaz; Bipasha Basu – Raaz; Karisma Kapoor – Shakti; Rani Mukerji – Saathiya
Best Supporting Actor	Best Supporting Actress
Vivek Oberoi – Company; Amitabh Bachchan – Aankhen; Jackie Shroff – Devdas; Mohanlal – Company; Sanjay Dutt – Kaante	Madhuri Dixit – Devdas; Antara Mali – Company; Kirron Kher – Devdas; Shilpa Shetty – Rishtey; Sushmita Sen – Filhaal
Best Comedian	Best Villain
Paresh Rawal – Awara Paagal Deewana; Govinda – Akhiyon Se Goli Maare; Johnny Lever – Humraaz; Mahesh Manjrekar – Kaante; Paresh Rawal – Aankhen	Ajay Devgn – Deewangee; Akshaye Khanna – Humraaz; Manoj Bajpayee – Road; Nana Patekar – Shakti; Shabana Azmi – Makdee
Best Male Debut	Best Female Debut
Vivek Oberoi – Company	Esha Deol – Koi Mere Dil Se Poochhe
Best Music Director	Best Lyricist
Saathiya – A. R. Rahman; Devdas – Ismail Darbar; Humraaz – Himesh Reshammiya; Kaante – Anand Raj Anand; Raaz – Nadeem-Shravan	Saathiya – Gulzar – Saathiya; Devdas – Ismail Darbar – Dola Re Dola; Humraaz – Sudhakar Sharma – Sanam Mere Humraaz; Humraaz – Sudhakar Sharma – Tune Zindagi Mein Aake; Raaz – Sameer – Aapke Pyaar Mein
Best Playback Singer – Male	Best Playback Singer – Female
Saathiya – Sonu Nigam – Saathiya; Humraaz – Krishnakumar Kunnath – Bardaasht Nahi Kar Sakta; Humraaz – Kumar Sanu – Sanam Mere Humraaz; Kyaa Dil Ne Kahaa – Shaan – Nikamma; Sur: The Melody of Life – Lucky Ali – Aa Bhi Ja	Devdas – Kavita Krishnamurthy & Shreya Ghoshal – Dola Re Dola; Devdas – Kavita Krishnamurthy – Maar Daala; Devdas – Shreya Ghoshal – Bairi Piya; Humraaz – Alka Yagnik – Sanam Mere Humraaz; Raaz – Alka Yagnik – Aapke Pyaar Mein

=== Technical Awards ===
Best Story	Best Screenplay
Company – Jaideep Sahni	Saathiya – Mani Ratnam
Best Dialogue	Scene of the Year
Company – Jaideep Sahni and Saathiya – Gulzar	Devdas – Confrontation Scene Between Parvati & Chandramukhi
Best Action	Best Choreography
Awara Paagal Deewana — Philip Ko & Abbas Ali Moghal	Devdas – Saroj Khan – Dola Re Dola
Best Cinematography	Best Art Direction
Devdas – Binod Pradhan	Devdas – Nitin Chandrakant Desai
Best Background Score	Best Editing
The Legend of Bhagat Singh – A. R. Rahman	Company – Chandan Arora

==== Special awards ====
Lifetime Achievement Award
- Jeetendra
- Rekha
R. D. Burman Award
- Shreya Ghoshal – Devdas

=== Critics' awards ===
Best Film (Best Director)
The Legend of Bhagat Singh (Rajkumar Santoshi)
Best Actor	Best Actress
Ajay Devgn – Company and The Legend of Bhagat Singh	Manisha Koirala – Company and Rani Mukerji – Saathiya

== Biggest Winners ==
- Devdas – 11 Wins
- Company – 7 Wins
- Saathiya – 6 Wins
- The Legend of Bhagat Singh – 2 Wins
- Deewangee – 1 Win
- Awara Paagal Deewana – 2 Wins
- Raaz – 6 Nominations
- Humraaz – 12 Nominations

== See also ==
- Filmfare Awards
