= Hemant Chaturvedi =

Indian film cinematographer

- Born: 6 March 1968 (age 57); Gorakhpur, India
- Occupation: Cinematographer

Hemant Chaturvedi is an Indian cinematographer in the Hindi film industry, he received great critical acclaim for his first feature, Company (2002). "His frames thrive on the sense of realism, wrote The Hindu, "and the colours capture the gore, dust and highways of the crime world effectively". Thereafter he worked with Vishal Bhardwaj in two successive films, and winning acclaim for Maqbool (2002). Recently he received good reviews of Kurbaan (2009), as per film critic Nikhat Kazmi, his work "serenades" both New Delhi and New York where the films was shot.

== Career ==
Hemant pursued Mass Communication from A.J.K. Mass Communication Research Centre at Jamia Millia Islamia, New Delhi. Over the years, Hemant has worked with directors like Ram Gopal Varma, Vishal Bhardwaj and Aparna Sen, also shot films such as Company, Maqbool, Makdee and Kurbaan and various television shows like "Rendezvous with Simi Garewal", "Kaun Banega Crorepati" amongst others. In 2015, he decided to move on from Cinematography and quit the industry completely. Since then he has finished shooting a documentary on old Mumbai based Cinematographers, and is busy consolidating his vast work as a still photographer. In last year, he has been part of four group shows and has had one solo show of his still photography works with Wonderwall Gallery, New Delhi. In 2018 he finished two commemorative still photography projects for his alma mater, St.Xavier's College, Mumbai. These involved a Sesquicentennial Calendar Project and a series of portraits of retired Jesuits, teachers and staff. Both were received with tremendous appreciation and acclaim. There is a continuing project on the Guru-Shishya Parampara in Dhrupad (a form of Indian Classical Music) and has finished photographing two Gurukuls so far. Also in progress is a complex project on the subject of Single Screen Cinemas, which is a Pan-India Project. Hemant Chaturvedi only works on his own, self-initiated projects, and now only as a still photographer.

== Filmography ==
| Year | Film | Language | Notes |
|---|---|---|---|
| 2002 | Company | Hindi | |
| 2002 | Makdee | Hindi | |
| 2003 | Maqbool | Hindi | |
| 2005 | 15 Park Avenue | English | |
| 2006 | Yun Hota Toh Kya Hota | Hindi | |
| 2006 | Anthony Kaun Hai | Hindi | |
| 2007 | Positive | Hindi | Short film |
| 2009 | Kurbaan | Hindi | |
| 2012 | Ishaqzaade | Hindi | |
| 2012 | Arjun: The Warrior Prince | Hindi | |
| 2014 | Ungli | Hindi | |
| 2014 | Dekh Tamasha Dekh | Hindi | |
| 2015 | Brothers | Hindi | |
