= Bairi Piya =

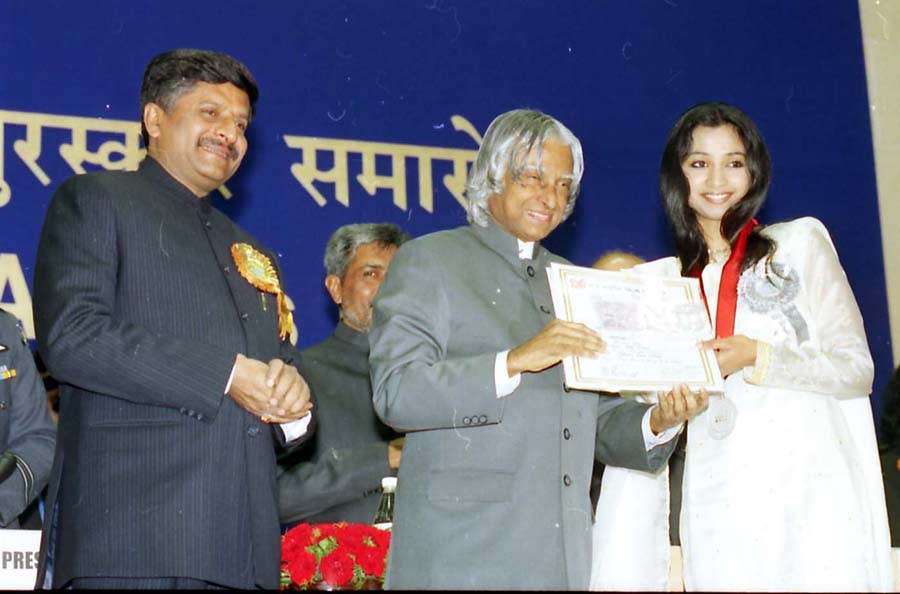
- Dr. A. P. J. Abdul Kalam presenting Shreya Ghoshal the National Film Award for "Bairi Piya".

Song by Shreya Ghoshal and Udit Narayan

from the album Devdas
- Language: Hindi
- Released: 17 October 2002
- Length: 5:23
- Label: Eros Now
- Composer: Ismail Darbar
- Lyricist: Nusrat Badr
- Producer: Sanjay Leela Bhansali

Music video
- "Bairi Piya" on YouTube

"Bairi Piya" is a song from the 2002 Bollywood film, Devdas. The song is composed by Ismail Darbar and sung by Shreya Ghoshal along with Udit Narayan. The lyrics were penned by Nusrat Badr. The song features Aishwarya Rai and Shah Rukh Khan in the video. Shreya Ghoshal received many accolades for her rendition of the song, most notably the national film award.

== Development ==
Ghoshal recorded the whole song in a single take, without even knowing that she was being recorded, and received much appreciation from the established movie personalities involved in the project.

I remember I was asked to rehearse the song once before finally recording it. I simply closed my eyes and sang without a break. When I opened my eyes, I noticed a lot of excitement and chaos outside the recording room. Then Sanjayji told me I had sung the song so well that they had recorded it at one go.

— Ghoshal sharing her experience of recording "Bairi Piya"

She was sixteen when she recorded this first song for her as well as the film, with Udit Narayan. Her Higher Secondary Examinations were nearing that time and she would take her books and notebooks to the studio in order to study during downtime.

== Picturization ==
The song is picturized on Parvati (Aishwarya Rai) and Devdas (Shah Rukh Khan). The song picturises the romance and the sweet relation between the two characters and their love for each other since their childhood.

== Reception ==
"Bairi Piya" was an instant success and topped the charts. Ghoshal became the first and till date is the only singer to win both Filmfare and National Film Awards for her debut album. Shreya's rendition of "Ish" or "Eesh" in the song became the highlight of the character Parvati and was well appraised. Reviewing the soundtrack, Aniket Joshi of PlanetBollywood.com said, "If you liked "Aankhon Ki Gustakhiyan" from Hum Dil De Chuke Sanam, I can pretty much guarantee you’ll like “Bairi Piya”. The song falls in the same genre as the previously mentioned song from Hum Dil De Chuke Sanam, a chhed-chhad song, but done with a lot of grace and maturity. Yes, that’s quite hard to put together. Shreya Ghoshal and Udit Narayan render this number. The singing, like all of the songs in the album is just mind-blowing. The unique part of the song is the "ish" that Darbar has put in at certain points in the song, very unique!". While reviewing for Rediff.com, Sukanya Verma wrote, "Udit Narayan and Shreya murmur sweet nothing as they playfully chide and make up in Bairi piya. Narayan successfully captures the eternal romanticism of Devdas whereas Shreya brings an element of impishness to Paro's character by blushing "Eesh" at every given opportunity."

== Accolades ==
Year	Award	Nominee	Category	Result	Ref.
2003	Filmfare Awards	Shreya Ghoshal	Best Female Playback Singer	Nominated	
2003	Filmfare Awards	Shreya Ghoshal	RD Burman Award for New Music Talent	Won	
2003	National Film Awards	Shreya Ghoshal	Best Female Playback Singer	Won	

== See also ==
- Devdas
- Dola Re Dola
