= Dola Re Dola =

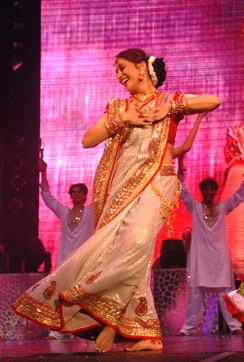
- Madhuri Dixit dancing to the song

Song by Kavita Krishnamurthy, Shreya Ghoshal and KK

from the album Devdas
- Released: 2002
- Genre: Filmi, Hindustani classical
- Length: 6:36
- Label: Eros Now
- Composer: Ismail Darbar
- Lyricist: Nusrat Badr
- Producer: Sanjay Leela Bhansali

Music video
- "Dola Re Dola" on YouTube

"Dola Re Dola" is a song from the 2002 Indian period romantic drama film Devdas, directed by Sanjay Leela Bhansali, and starring Shah Rukh Khan, Aishwarya Rai and Madhuri Dixit. The song was composed by Ismail Darbar, with lyrics provided by Nusrat Badr, and sung by Kavita Krishnamurthy, Shreya Ghoshal and KK (backing vocals). The song received high acclaim from critics and audiences alike, becoming a blockbuster due to the unique dance duet between Aishwarya Rai and Madhuri Dixit, two of the leading actresses of the era.

== Picturization ==
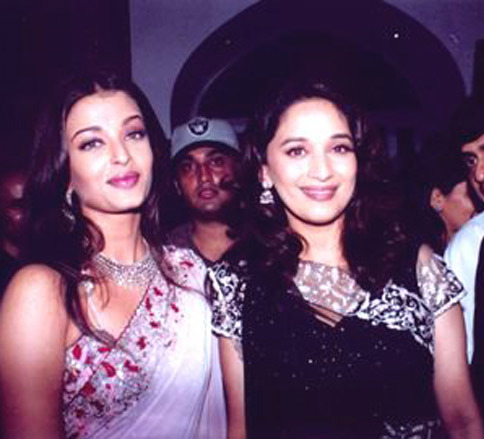
The song is picturized on Aishwarya Rai (left) and Madhuri Dixit (right).

The song is picturized on Parvati (Aishwarya Rai) and Chandramukhi (Madhuri Dixit), and appears during the celebration of Durga Puja. Both are expressing the love and ecstasy by their dancing. The video song also had some long takes.

The video of the song is shot in the studios built with a lavish and expensive set. It had a production cost of ₹25 million ($514,300), equivalent to ₹104 million ($0.7 million) adjusted for inflation. It was the most expensive Bollywood music video up until "Azeem O Shaan Shahenshah" from Jodhaa Akbar (2008).

== Choreography ==
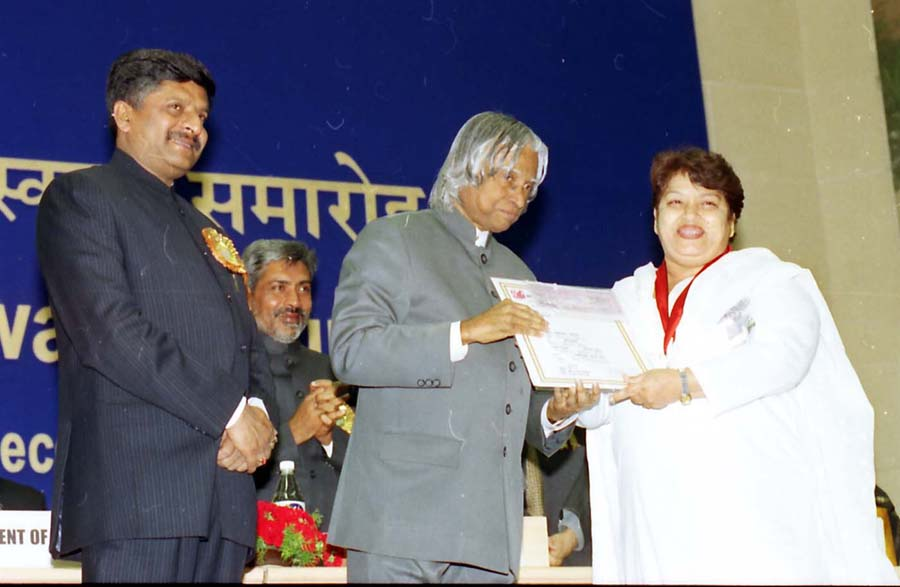
Khan receiving the National Film Award for Best Choreography for "Dola Re Dola" by President A. P. J. Abdul Kalam, in December 2003.

The song in the video was choreographed by Saroj Khan, for which she won her first National Film Award for Best Choreography. The song shows Parvati and Chandramukhi dancing during Durga Puja. The choreography of the song was something different as it was a mix of Indian classical dance forms. The form of dance that Saroj Khan explored with "Dola Re Dola", is called Nautwary. It included steps of Kathak and Bharatnatyam.

According to Saroj Khan, this song was one of the toughest she had to endure as Madhuri and Aishwarya are brilliant dancers. She had to balance in giving steps equally good to both that none of them would feel that they would be left out. But nothing of the sort occurred. During the shot, there were several retakes and at a particular point, they had to perform a step that they had to fall, to be perfectly in sync with the beats. It became physically demanding for both actresses. Sanjay Leela Bhansali was involved in the dance sequences.

== Reception ==
The song became an instant hit, as it combined the 2 leading heroines of the era in a unique dance song. The song received numerous awards in categories of singing and choreography.

== Impact ==
The song was sampled by the Indian hip-hop producer Parimal Shais, in the track "Dola Re", featuring rappers Naam Sujal and DHP.

== Accolades ==
Year	Award	Nominee	Category	Result	Ref.
2003	Filmfare Awards	Kavita Krishnamurthy & Shreya Ghoshal	Best Female Playback Singer	Won	
2003	Filmfare Awards	Saroj Khan	Best Choreography	Won	
2003	Filmfare Awards	Nusrat Badr	Best Lyrics	Nominated	
2003	IIFA Awards	Kavita Krishnamurthy & Shreya Ghoshal	Best Female Playback Singer	Won	
2003	IIFA Awards	Saroj Khan	Best Choreography	Won	
2003	IIFA Awards	Nusrat Badr	Best Lyrics	Won	
2003	National Film Awards	Saroj Khan	Best Choreography	Won	
2003	Zee Cine Awards	Kavita Krishnamurthy & Shreya Ghoshal	Best Female Playback Singer	Won	
2003	Zee Cine Awards	Saroj Khan	Best Choreography	Won	
2003	Stardust Awards	Shreya Ghoshal	New Musical Sensation - Female	Won	
2003	Sansui Awards	Kavita Krishnamurthy & Shreya Ghoshal	Best Female Playback Singer	Won	

== See also ==
- Devdas
- Bairi Piya
