= List of Hindi films of 2002 =

This article contains a list of films produced by the Bollywood film industry based in Mumbai in 2002.

== Top-grossing films ==
The top-grossing films at the Indian box office in 2002.

Rank	Title	Director	Worldwide gross	Reference
1	Devdas	Sanjay Leela Bhansali	₹90 crore	
2	Raaz	Vikram Bhatt	₹37.2 crore	
3	Kaante	Sanjay Gupta	₹36.37 crore	
4	Hum Tumhare Hain Sanam	K. S. Adhiyaman	₹34.76 crore	
5	Aankhen	Vipul Amrutlal Shah	₹33.80 crore	
6	Mujhse Dosti Karoge!	Kunal Kohli	₹33.61 crore	
7	Humraaz	Abbas Mustan	₹29.71 crore	
8	Saathiya	Shaad Ali	₹29.15 crore	
9	Awara Paagal Deewana	Vikram Bhatt	₹27.58 crore	
10	Company	Ram Gopal Verma	₹25.02 crore	

== List of released films ==
Title	Director	Cast	Genre
16 December	Mani Shankar	Milind Soman, Dipannita Sharma, Gulshan Grover, Aditi Govitrikar, Sushant Singh	Action
23rd March 1931: Shaheed	Guddu Dhanoa	Sunny Deol, Bobby Deol, Divya Dutta, Amrita Singh, Aishwarya Rai, Rajesh Khera	Historical drama
Aankhen	Vipul Shah	Amitabh Bachchan, Akshay Kumar, Paresh Rawal, Arjun Rampal, Sushmita Sen, Aditya Pancholi, Shreyas Talpade, Kashmera Shah	Thriller, action
Aap Mujhe Achche Lagne Lage	Vikram Bhatt	Hrithik Roshan, Amisha Patel, Ali Asgar, Mukesh Tiwari, Alok Nath	Romance, drama
Ab Ke Baras	Raj Kanwar	Amrita Rao, Arya Babbar, Ashish Vidyarthi	Romance, drama
Agni Varsha	Arjun Sajnani	Amitabh Bachchan, Akkineni Nagarjuna, Jackie Shroff, Raveena Tandon, Milind Soman, Prabhu Deva, Sonali Kulkarni	Period drama
Akhiyon Se Goli Maare	Harmesh Malhotra	Govinda, Raveena Tandon, Kader Khan, Johnny Lever, Asrani, Sharat Saxena	Comedy
Annarth	Ravi Dewan	Sunil Shetty, Sanjay Dutt, Ashutosh Rana, Preeti Jhangiani, Johny Lever, Tinu Anand	Action, thriller
Ansh: The Deadly Part	Rajan Johri	Om Puri, Ashutosh Rana, Abbas, Sharbani Mukherji	Action, thriller
Awara Paagal Deewana	Vikram Bhatt	Akshay Kumar, Sunil Shetty, Paresh Rawal, Aftab Shivdasani, Amrita Arora, Rahul Dev, Preeti Jhangiani, Om Puri, Johnny Lever, Asrani	Action, comedy
Baaja	Apurba Kishore Bir		Children's
Badhaai Ho Badhaai	Satish Kaushik	Anil Kapoor, Shilpa Shetty, Kirti Reddy	Comedy, drama
Bollywood Queen	Jeremy Wooding	Preeya Kalidas, James McAvoy	Drama
Bomb the System			
Chalo Ishq Ladaaye	Aziz Sejawal	Govinda, Rani Mukerji, Sanjay Suri, Kader Khan, Zohra Sehgal, Johnny Lever, Suniel Shetty, Gulshan Grover	Comedy
Chor Machaaye Shor	Aziz Sejawal	Bobby Deol, Shilpa Shetty, Shekhar Suman, Bipasha Basu, Rajat Bedi, Rajpal Yadav	Comedy, romance, crime
Company	Ram Gopal Varma	Mohanlal, Ajay Devgn, Manisha Koirala, Vivek Oberoi, Antara Mali	Crime, drama
Deewangee	Anees Bazmee	Ajay Devgn, Akshaye Khanna, Urmila Matondkar, Tiku Talsania	Thriller
Desh Devi	Milind Ukey	Shrivallabh Vyas, Jaya Seal	
Devdas	Sanjay Leela Bhansali	Shah Rukh Khan, Aishwarya Rai, Madhuri Dixit, Jackie Shroff	Romance, drama, musical, period
Dil Hai Tumhaara	Kundan Shah	Rekha, Preity Zinta, Mahima Chaudhry, Arjun Rampal, Jimmy Sheirgill, Alok Nath	Family, romance, drama
Dil Vil Pyar Vyar	Anant Mahadevan	Jimmy Sheirgill, Sanjay Suri, Namrata Shirodkar, R. Madhavan, Sonali Kulkarni, Hrishita Bhatt, Rakesh Bapat, Bhavna Pani	Romance, drama
Durga	J.D. Chakravarthy	J.D Chakravarthy, Priyanka Upendra, Snehal Dabi, Sayaji Shinde	Romance, action, drama
Ek Chhotisi Love Story	Shashilal K. Nair	Ranvir Shorey, Manisha Koirala, Aditya Seal, Vir Das, Anushka Sharma	Erotic
Encounter: The Killing	Ajay Phansekar	Naseeruddin Shah, Dilip Prabhavalkar, Tara Deshpande	Social drama
Filhaal	Meghna Gulzar	Tabu, Sushmita Sen, Sanjay Suri, Palash Sen	Drama
Ghaav: The Wound	Kumar Jay	Pankaj Berry, Rahul Bhatt, Seema Biswas, Gayatri	Crime drama
Gunaah	Amol Shetge	Dino Morea, Bipasha Basu, Ashutosh Rana, Irrfan Khan	Thriller, romance
Haan Maine Bhi Pyaar Kiya	Dharmesh Darshan	Akshay Kumar, Karisma Kapoor, Abhishek Bachchan, Mohnish Bahl, Upasana Singh	Drama, romance
Hathyar	Mahesh Manjrekar	Sanjay Dutt, Shilpa Shetty, Namrata Shirodkar	Drama
Hum Kisise Kum Nahin	David Dhawan	Amitabh Bachchan, Supriya Karnik, Ajay Devgn, Sanjay Dutt, Aishwarya Rai, Ashish Vidyarthi, Annu Kapoor, Rajpal Yadav, Paresh Rawal, Colin Farrell	Action, comedy
Hum Pyar Tumhi Se Kar Baithe	Mohan Singh Rathod	Jugal Hansraj, Tina Rana	Romance
Hum Tumhare Hain Sanam	K. S. Adhiyaman	Salman Khan, Shah Rukh Khan, Madhuri Dixit, Atul Agnihotri, Aishwarya Rai	Drama, romance
Humraaz	Abbas–Mustan	Bobby Deol, Akshaye Khanna, Amisha Patel, Firoz Irani, Johnny Lever, Suhasini Mulay	Thriller, romance, musical
Jaani Dushman: Ek Anokhi Kahani	Rajkumar Kohli	Sunny Deol, Akshay Kumar, Sunil Shetty, Atharvaa, Arshad Warsi, Aftab Shivdasani, Manisha Koirala	Fantasy
Jang Aur Aman	Anand Patwardhan		Documentary
Jeena Sirf Merre Liye	Satish Kaushik	Tusshar Kapoor, Kareena Kapoor, Mallika Sherawat	Romance
Kaante	Sanjay Gupta	Amitabh Bachchan, Sanjay Dutt, Suniel Shetty, Kumar Gaurav, Mahesh Manjrekar, Lucky Ali, Malaika Arora, Rati Agnihotri	Action, thriller
Kabhie Tum Kabhie Hum		Mamta Kulkarni, Anjan Srivastav, Vijayendra Ghatge	Comedy, drama
Karz: The Burden of Truth	Harry Baweja	Sunny Deol, Sunil Shetty, Shilpa Shetty	Action, thriller
Kehtaa Hai Dil Baar Baar	Rahul Dholakia	Jimmy Shergill, Kim Sharma, Paresh Rawal	Romance
Kitne Door Kitne Paas	Mehul Kumar	Fardeen Khan, Ayub Khan, Amrita Arora, Sonali Kulkarni	Romance, drama, comedy
Koi Mere Dil Se Poochhe	Boney Kapoor	Jaya Bachchan, Esha Deol, Aftab Shivdasani, Sanjay Kapoor, Anupam Kher	Drama, romance, social
Kranti	Naresh Malhotra	Bobby Deol, Amisha Patel, Om Puri, Vinod Khanna, Pallavi Kulkarni	Action, drama
Kuch Tum Kaho Kuch Hum Kahein	K. Ravi Shankar	Fardeen Khan, Richa Pallod, Sharad Kapoor, Sanjai Mishra, Farida Jalal	Romance
Kya Yehi Pyaar Hai	K. Murali Mohan Rao	Amisha Patel, Aftab Shivdasani, Sarfaraz Khan, Ashish Vidyarthi, Jackie Shroff	Romance
Kyaa Dil Ne Kahaa	Sanjay Chhel	Tusshar Kapoor, Esha Deol, Raj Babbar, Atul Parchure	Romance
Lal Salaam	Gaganvihari Borate	Nandita Das, Sharad Kapoor, Makrand Deshpande, Vijay Raaz	
Maa Tujhhe Salaam	Tinu Verma	Sunny Deol, Tabu, Rajat Bedi, Arbaaz Khan, Inder Kumar	Drama
Maine Dil Tujhko Diya	Sohail Khan	Sohail Khan, Sameera Reddy, Eijaz Khan, Sanjay Dutt, Kabir Bedi, Dalip Tahil	Action, romance
Makdee	Vishal Bhardwaj	Shabana Azmi, Makarand Deshpande	Comedy, horror
Maseeha	Partho Ghosh	Sunil Shetty, Namrata Shirodkar, Inder Kumar, Manek Bedi, Rajpal Yadav, Mukesh Rishi	Action
Mere Yaar Ki Shaadi Hai	Sanjay Gadhvi	Uday Chopra, Bipasha Basu, Tulip Joshi, Jimmy Shergill, Nitesh Pandey, Tannaz Irani	Romance
Mitr, My Friend	Revathi	Shobhana, Matt Phillips	Drama
Mohabbat Ho Gayi Hai Tumse	Rishi Talwar	Sanjay Dutt, Shamita Shetty, Chandrachur Singh	
Mujhse Dosti Karoge!	Kunal Kohli	Hrithik Roshan, Rani Mukerji, Kareena Kapoor, Uday Chopra, Kiran Kumar	Romance, drama, comedy, musical
Mulaqaat	K. Ravi Shankar	Vinay Anand, Arun Bakshi, Rita Bhaduri, Milind Gunaji	
Na Tum Jaano Na Hum	Arjun Sablok	Saif Ali Khan, Hrithik Roshan, Esha Deol, Ashima Bhalla, Shilpa Saklani, Alok Nath	Romance, drama
Nishad	Shaji N. Karun		Drama
Om Jai Jagadish	Anupam Kher	Waheeda Rehman, Parmeet Sethi, Anil Kapoor, Fardeen Khan, Abhishek Bachchan, Mahima Chaudhry, Urmila Matondkar, Lillete Dubey, Tara Sharma	Family, drama, social
Pitaah	Mahesh Manjrekar	Sanjay Dutt, Nandita Das, Salil Ankola, Jackie Shroff, Om Puri, Shivaji Satam	Action, drama
Pyaar Diwana Hota Hai	Kirti Kumar	Govinda, Rani Mukerji, Deepak Tijori, Apurva Agnihotri	Romance
Pyar Ki Dhun	Samarjit Dasgupta		Romance, drama
Pyaasa	A. Muthu	Yukta Mookhey, Aftab Shivdasani	Action, crime
Raaz	Vikram Bhatt	Bipasha Basu, Dino Morea	Horror, thriller, romance, musical
Reshma Aur Sultan	S. Kumar	Dharmendra, Ankush Mohit, Sapna, Hemant Birje, Satnam Kaur	Action
Rishtey	Indra Kumar	Anil Kapoor, Karisma Kapoor, Shilpa Shetty	Drama, family
Road	Rajat Mukherjee	Vivek Oberoi, Antara Mali, Manoj Bajpai, Vijay Raaz, Rajpal Yadav	Thriller
Saathiya	Shaad Ali	Vivek Oberoi, Rani Mukerji, Shah Rukh Khan, Tabu, Kunal Kumar, Sharat Saxena, Satish Shah, Sandhya Mridul, Tinnu Anand, Tanuja	Drama, romance, social, musical
Shaheed-E-Azam	Sukumar Nair	Sonu Sood, Raj Zutshi, Dev Gill	Historical, drama
Shakti - The Power	Boney Kapoor	Karisma Kapoor, Nana Patekar, Sanjay Kapoor, Shahrukh Khan	Drama
Shararat	Gurudev Bhalla	Abhishek Bachchan, Hrishita Bhatt, Mohnish Bahl, Amrish Puri	Comedy, drama
Soch	Sushen Bhatnagar	Sanjay Kapoor, Arbaaz Khan, Raveena Tandon, Danny Denzongpa, Aditi Govitrikar	Thriller, mystery
Sur: The Melody of Life	Tanuja Chandra	Lucky Ali, Gauri Karnik, Harsh Vashisht, Simone Singh, Nitin	Musical
The Legend of Bhagat Singh	Rajkumar Santoshi	Ajay Devgn, Amrita Rao, Raj Babbar, Sushant Singh	Historical, drama
Tumko Na Bhool Paayenge	Pankaj Parashar	Salman Khan, Dia Mirza, Sushmita Sen, Inder Kumar, Arbaaz Khan	Drama
Tum Se Achcha Kaun Hai	Deepak Anand	Nakul Kapoor, Rati Agnihotri, Kim Sharma, Aarti Chabria, Ali Asgar	Romance, drama
Waah! Tera Kya Kehna	Manoj Agrawal	Govinda, Raveena Tandon, Preeti Jhangiani	Comedy
Yeh Dil Aashiqanaa	Kuku Kohli	Karan Nath, Jividha Sharma	Romance, action
Yeh Hai Jalwa	David Dhawan	Rishi Kapoor, Salman Khan, Amisha Patel, Rinke Khanna, Rati Agnihotri, Sanjay Dutt, Anupam Kher	Comedy
Yeh Kaisi Mohabbat	Dinkar Kapur	Deepak Tijori, Viveka Babajee, Krishna Abhishek, Mukesh Rishi	Romance, drama
Yeh Kya Ho Raha Hai?	Hansal Mehta	Prashant Chianani, Aamir Ali, Vaibhav Jhalani, Yash Pandit, Payal Rohatgi	Comedy, romance
Yeh Mohabbat Hai	Umesh Mehra	Rahul Bhatt, Johnny Lever	Action
Zindagi Khoobsoorat Hai	Manoj Punj	Gurdas Maan, Tabu, Divya Dutta, Rajat Kapoor	

== See also ==
- List of Hindi films of 2003
- List of Hindi films of 2001
