= IIFA Award for Best Background Score =

Annual film award in India

The IIFA Best Background Score is a technical award chosen ahead of the ceremonies.

A. R. Rahman is the most awarded artist with seven wins followed by Pritam and Shankar–Ehsaan–Loy with three wins each.

== Multiple wins ==
Wins	Recipient
7	A. R. Rahman
3	Shankar–Ehsaan–Loy, Pritam

== Awards ==
The winners are listed below:-

Year	Winner	Film
2026	A.R. Rahman	Chhaava
2025	Achint Thakkar	Jigra
2024	Harshavardhan Rameshwar	Animal
2023	Sam C. S.	Vikram Vedha
2022	A. R. Rahman	Atrangi Re
2020	Shashwat Sachdev	Uri: The Surgical Strike
2019	Daniel B. George	Andhadhun
2018	Pritam	Jagga Jasoos
2017	Pritam	Ae Dil Hai Mushkil
2016	Sanchit Balhara	Bajirao Mastani
2015	Vishal Bhardwaj	Haider
2014	Shankar–Ehsaan–Loy	Bhaag Milkha Bhaag
2013	Pritam	Barfi!
2012	A. R. Rahman	Rockstar
2011	Shankar–Ehsaan–Loy	My Name is Khan
2010	Sanjay Wandrekar, Atul Raninga, Shantanu Moitra	3 Idiots
2009	A. R. Rahman	Jodhaa Akbar
2008	A. R. Rahman	Guru
2007	A. R. Rahman	Rang De Basanti
2006	Monty Sharma	Black
2005	Salim-Sulaiman	Mujhse Shaadi Karogi
2004	Shankar–Ehsaan–Loy	Kal Ho Naa Ho
2003	A. R. Rahman	Saathiya
2002	Babloo Chakravarthy	Kabhi Khushi Kabhi Gham
2001	Aadesh Shrivastava	Refugee
2000	Vishal Dadlani	Godmother

== See also ==
- IIFA Awards
- Bollywood
- Cinema of India
