= Nusrat Badr =

Indian lyricist (died 2020)

Nusrat Badr (died 24 January 2020) was a lyricist, of 817 songs in 108 films working mostly on Bollywood movies as songwriter. He was nominated for Filmfare Award for Best Lyricist in 2002 for the song "Dola Re Dola" from the movie Devdas. He was the son of Indian poet Bashir Badr.

== Filmography ==
Films:

- Devdas
- Deewar
- Saawariya
- Chanda Ki Doli
- Deewangee
- Familywala
- Impatient Vivek
- Alag
- Ada
- Unlimited Nasha
- Jahan Jaaeyega Hamen Paaeyega
- Rehguzar

Others:

- Khwahishein
- Saanwari
- Jhilmil Sama
- Aye Jahan Aasmaa

== Awards and nominations ==
Nominated for Filmfare Award for Best Lyricist in 2002 for "Dola Re" from Devdas.
