= Shakti: The Power =

2002 film directed by Krishna Vamsi

- Theatrical release poster
- Directed by: Krishna Vamsi
- Written by: Krishna Vamsi
- Dialogues by: Kamal Pandey
- Based on: Anthapuram (1998) by Krishna Vamsi
- Produced by: Boney Kapoor; Sridevi Kapoor
- Starring: Karisma Kapoor; Nana Patekar; Sanjay Kapoor; Shah Rukh Khan
- Cinematography: Sethu Sriram
- Edited by: Shrish Kunder
- Music by: Songs: Ismail Darbar; Guest Composition: Anu Malik; Score: Mani Sharma
- Production company: Sridevi Productions
- Distributed by: Eros International
- Release date: 20 September 2002 (India)
- Running time: 177 minutes
- Country: India
- Language: Hindi
- Box office: ₹20 crore

Shakti: The Power is a 2002 Indian Hindi-language action film co-written and directed by Krishna Vamsi. The films Karisma Kapoor, Nana Patekar, Sanjay Kapoor in the lead roles, with Shah Rukh Khan, Deepti Naval, Ritu Shivpuri, Anupam Shyam and Prakash Raj in supporting roles. The film is a remake of the 1998 film Anthahpuram, which was based on the real-life story of Betty Mahmoody, depicted in the film Not Without My Daughter (1991) which itself was based on Betty Mahmoody's book of the same name. In the film, Shekhar and Nandini's decision to visit his ancestral house in a rural Indian town goes awry when they find themselves embroiled in a feudal gang war and try to return home to Canada. The film did not fare well commercially as expected.

At the 48th Filmfare Awards, Shakti: The Power received 2 nominations – Best Actress (Kapoor) and Best Villain (Patekar).

== Plot ==
Nandini lives in Canada with her husband Shekhar and their young son. After learning of unrest in his native village in India, Shekhar returns there with his family. Nandini soon discovers that Shekhar's father, Narsimha, is the head of a powerful feuding family.

When Shekhar is killed in the violence, Nandini decides to return to Canada with her son. Narsimha refuses to allow the child to leave, intending to raise him as the family's heir. Nandini attempts to escape from the household and is helped by Jai, a drifter who becomes involved in her flight.

== Cast ==
- Nana Patekar as Narasimha, Shekhar's father
- Karisma Kapoor as Nandini, Shekhar's wife
- Shah Rukh Khan as Jai Singh
- Sanjay Kapoor as Shekhar, Nandini's late husband
- Jai Gidwani as Raja, Nandini and Shekhar's son
- Deepti Naval as Shekhar's mother
- Divya Dutta as Shekhar's sister
- Ritu Shivpuri as Shekhar's sister
- Rajashree Solanki as Shekhar's sister
- Prakash Raj as a sharpshooter
- Vijay Raaz as Beeja
- Tiku Talsania as Nandini's uncle
- Jaspal Bhatti as Nandini's uncle
- Anupam Shyam as Maharaj, Narasimha's half-brother
- Chandrakant Gokhale as Narasimha's father
- Aishwarya Rai Bachchan as a dancer in the song "Ishq Kameena" (special appearance)
- Mumaith Khan as a dancer in the song "Ishq Kameena"
- Prabhu Deva as a dancer in the song "Dumroo Baje Re" (special appearance)
- Ganesh Acharya as a dancer in the song "Dumroo Baja Re" (special appearance)

== Production ==
=== Casting ===
The film was produced by then-retired actress Sridevi (Sanjay Kapoor's sister-in-law) under the banner Sridevi Productions and was supposed to be her comeback film, but she had to find a replacement when she found out she was pregnant. She initially offered her role to Kajol, but she rejected it so Karisma Kapoor was signed instead. Fardeen Khan was the original choice for Sanjay Kapoor's role and the film was originally titled Vaapsi.

=== Filming ===
The film was shot in Rajasthan, with rural sequences filmed in and around Jaipur, Pushkar, and Jaisalmer. The climax airport scene was filmed at Jodhpur Airport. Early scenes depicting the couple’s life abroad were shot in Vancouver and Calgary, with Lake Louise in Banff National Park, Alberta, featured in one of the songs.

== Music ==
Shakti: The Power

Soundtrack album by Ismail Darbar and Anu Malik
- Released: 24 August 2002
- Genre: Feature film soundtrack
- Label: Tips Industries

The soundtrack was composed by Ismail Darbar, with lyrics were written by Mehboob. One song "Ishq Kameena" was composed by Anu Malik with lyrics written by Sameer.

No.	Title	Lyrics	Music	Singer(s)	Length
1.	"Dil Ne Pukara Hai"	Mehboob	Ismail Darbar	Alka Yagnik, Adnan Sami	06:27
2.	"Dumroo Baje"	Mehboob	Ismail Darbar	Sukhwinder Singh	06:15
3.	"Hum Tum Mile" (Male)	Mehboob	Ismail Darbar	Adnan Sami	05:37
4.	"Hum Tum Mile" (Female)	Mehboob	Ismail Darbar	Kavita Krishnamurthy	06:10
5.	"Ishq Kamina"	Sameer	Anu Malik	Sonu Nigam, Alka Yagnik	05:26
6.	"Jhoomti Gataon Mein"	Mehboob	Ismail Darbar	Mohammad Salamat	07:35
7.	"Mere Munna Raja"	Mehboob	Ismail Darbar	Anuradha Paudwal	05:05
8.	"Aye Chand Dil Ke"	Mehboob	Ismail Darbar	Kavita Krishnamurthy	06:57
9.	"Jhoomati Ghata Mein"	Mehboob	Ismail Darbar	Instrumental	06:29

== Reception ==
=== Critical response ===
Derek Elley of Variety wrote that "Strikingly lensed in the wild semi-deserts of Rajasthan, and anchored by a finely shaded performance from Nana Patekar as the patriarchal father-in-law, film swings between believable realism and Bollywood formulae to rocky results". Majorie Baumgarten of Austin Chronicle wrote that "the film is a gripping drama that is full of memorable faces, emotions, and conflicts between the old ways and the new".

=== Box office ===
Shakti: The Power grossed ₹13.82 crore (US$1.4 million) in India and $1.35 million (₹6.54 crore) in other countries, for a worldwide total of ₹20.36 crore (US$2.1 million), against its ₹10 crore (US$1.0 million) budget. It had a worldwide opening weekend of ₹7.33 crore (US$760,000), and grossed ₹11.26 crore (US$1.2 million) in its first week. It is the 13th-highest-grossing Bollywood film of 2002 worldwide.

==== India ====
It opened on 20 September 2002, across 285 screens, and earned ₹98 lakh (US$100,000) nett on its opening day. It grossed ₹2.82 crore (US$290,000) nett in its opening weekend, and had a first week of ₹4.62 crore (US$480,000) nett. The film earned a total of ₹8.47 crore (US$880,000) nett, and was declared "Flop" by Box Office India. It is the 20th-highest-grossing film of 2002 in India.

==== Overseas ====
It had an opening weekend of $565,000 (₹2.74 crore) and went on to gross $770,000 (₹3.73 crore) in its first week. The film earned a total of $1.35 million (₹6.54 crore) at the end of its theatrical run. Overseas, It is the 5th-highest-grossing Bollywood film of 2002.

== Awards ==
Category	Nominees	Result
Star Screen Award for Best Actress	Karisma Kapoor	Nominated
Filmfare Award for Best Actress	Karisma Kapoor	Nominated
Filmfare Award for Best Villain	Nana Patekar	Nominated
