= Deewangee =

2002 Indian film by Anees Bazmee

- Theatrical release poster
- Directed by: Anees Bazmee
- Written by: Anees Bazmee; Neeraj Pathak; Humayum Mirza
- Produced by: Nitin Manmohan
- Starring: Akshaye Khanna; Urmila Matondkar; Ajay Devgn
- Cinematography: Pushan Kripalani
- Edited by: Ashfaq-Sarvar
- Music by: Ismail Darbar
- Production company: Neha Arts
- Release date: 25 October 2002
- Running time: 169 minutes
- Country: India
- Language: Hindi
- Budget: ₹90 million
- Box office: ₹220 million

Deewangee (transl. Madness) is a 2002 Indian Hindi-language psychological thriller film directed by Anees Bazmee and produced by Nitin Manmohan. The film stars Akshaye Khanna, and Urmila Matondkar and Ajay Devgan.The music was composed by Ismail Darbar, with lyrics by Salim Bijnori and Nusrat Badr. This was Devgn's first negative role for which he won the Filmfare Award for Best Villain.

It is inspired and has its first half adapted from Primal Fear (1996) by Gregory Hoblit which was itself based on William Diehl's novel of the same name. Released on 25 October 2002, the film was a commercial success at the box office. It was remade in Tamil as Kadhal Kirukkan in 2003 and in Telugu as Aadi Lakshmi in 2006.

== Plot ==
Raj Goyal (Akshaye Khanna), a young and successful criminal lawyer, famous for never having lost a case, is introduced to popular singer Sargam (Urmila Matondkar) by music magnate Ashwin Mehta (Vijayendra Ghatge). The following day, Ashwin is brutally murdered in his own house. The murderer, Tarang Bharadwaj (Ajay Devgn), who is Sargam's childhood friend and music mentor, is caught red-handed at the crime scene. He claims innocence, and Sargam, believing him, approaches Raj to defend him; Raj agrees after meeting Tarang.

Realising Tarang has a mental illness, Raj hires a psychiatrist (Seema Biswas) to study his case. Meanwhile, Raj and Sargam grow closer due to their frequent meetings and eventually fall in love. After another session or two, the psychiatrist finds out that Tarang has dissociative identity disorder, and his other personality goes by the name of Ranjeet.

Using a recording of Abhijeet (Nirmal Pandey) quarrelling with his sister-in-law, Drishti (Nishigandha Wad), as evidence, Raj meets her, and she eventually reveals that her husband had indeed misbehaved with Sargam and that she saw angst in Tarang's eyes, which later erupted like a storm. Raj speaks to Ranjeet, who is the complete opposite of the innocent and simple Tarang. Ranjeet admits to killing Ashwin, who had tried to molest Sargam at the party. Ranjeet sees Tarang as his friend, who in turn considers Sargam his wife. Bringing his split personality to the court, Raj is able to win the case and free Tarang.

Right after Tarang is acquitted, Raj finds out that the split personality disorder was an act put on by Tarang to get out of jail. Tarang then tells him to stay away from Sargam. Raj tries to reopen the case to protect Sargam but fails, and Tarang is moved to a mental hospital for treatment. Raj extends Tarang's stay in the mental hospital by proving that he is sick and needs further treatment, but Tarang wriggles out of Raj's attempt and is released. Raj appoints personal security for Sargam to ensure her safety, while Tarang relentlessly tries to reach her, during which he seriously injures Yana, Sargam's assistant.

Raj says that they can trap Tarang by having Sargam perform a show and Tarang come there. But Tarang kidnaps Sargam and takes her to an old fort where he has booked a vehicle to go abroad. Sargam secretly gives her location to Raj. Sargam, while trying to escape, tells Tarang that she loves Raj, to which Tarang responds by saying that he has to kill Raj. Soon Raj arrives, and a fight ensues, which ends with Sargam overpowering Tarang and pushing him into a nearby river.

The next morning, the police are unsuccessful in finding his body. The film ends with Sargam and Raj, now married, enjoying a vacation, and they hear someone sing one of Tarang's songs. Raj believes it cannot be Tarang, and because the song is so popular, anyone can sing it. However, a person is seen on a faraway bridge walking with crutches, seeming to be Tarang.

== Cast ==
- Ajay Devgan as Tarang Bharadwaj / Ranjeet
- Akshaye Khanna as Advocate Raj Goyal
- Urmila Matondkar as Sargam
- Vijayendra Ghatge as Ashwin Mehta
- Suresh Oberoi as Advocate Mr. Bhullar
- Nirmal Pandey as Abhijeet Mehta, Ashwin's brother
- Farida Jalal as Mrs. Goyal, Raj's mother.
- Seema Biswas as the psychiatrist Sarla
- Suhasini Mulay as the judge
- Tiku Talsania as Narayan Goyal, Raj's uncle
- Tannaz Irani as Yana
- Mohan Kapur as Vikrant Kapoor
- Nishigandha Wad as Dhristi, Ashwin Mehta's wife
- Rana Jung Bahadur as Police Officer Ashish Singh

== Music ==
Deewangee

Studio album by Ismail Darbar
- Released: 14 September 2002
- Genre: Feature film soundtrack
- Label: T-Series
- Producer: Ismail Darbar

Ismail Darbar chronology
Shakti - The Power (2002)	Deewangee (2002)	Baaz (2003)

The soundtrack of the film contains 11 songs and was released on 14 September 2002. The music is conducted by composer Ismail Darbar. According to the Indian trade website Box Office India, with around 12,00,000 units sold, this film's soundtrack album was the year's ninth highest-selling.

No.	Title	Lyrics	Artist(s)	Length
1.	"Pyar Se Pyare Tum Ho"	Salim Bijnori	Sonu Nigam, Kavita Krishnamurthy	6:27
2.	"Yeh Taazgi Yeh Saadgi"	Nusrat Badr	Sunidhi Chauhan	3:19
3.	"Saasein Saasein Hain"	Salim Bijnori	Sonu Nigam, Kavita Krishnamurthy	5:49
4.	"Saat Suron Ka"	Salim Bijnori	Udit Narayan, Kavita Krishnamurthy	5:56
5.	"Pyar Se Pyare Tum Ho"		Instrumental	4:00
6.	"Ai Ajnabi"	Salim Bijnori	Sunidhi Chauhan	6:02
7.	"Dholi O Dholi"	Salim Bijnori	Kavita Krishnamurthy, Babul Supriyo	7:00
8.	"Saat Suron Ka"	Salim Bijnori	Kavita Krishnamurthy	5:56
9.	"Yeh Taazgi Yeh Saadgi"	Nusrat Badr	KK, Mahalaxmi Iyer	7:10
10.	"Pyar Se Pyare Tum Ho (Sad)"	Salim Bijnori	Sonu Nigam	5:22
11.	"Hai Ishq Khata"	Nusrat Badr	Jaspinder Narula	5:55

== Reception ==
Deewangee received mixed reviews from critics. Bollywood Hungama rated the film 2.5/5, stating, "In an enterprise that boasts of two powerful performers-Ajay and Akshaye, comparisons are inevitable. But, to be honest, it's difficult to gauge who's better. Ajay Devgan essays a complex role with utmost ease, alternating between a simpleton and the shrewd (as part of the split personality!). Akshaye Khanna enacts a suave character with terrific understanding, proving yet again that he's amongst the best in the business today. Urmila Matondkar makes her presence felt in a male-dominated film. Her performance towards the end is praiseworthy. Amongst character artistes, Seema Biswas, Suresh Oberoi and Tanaz Currim are adequate. On the whole, DEEWANGEE has a novel story with several poignant moments as its USP. A well-made film with a few loose ends nonetheless, it has much to offer as compared to the vendetta fares and mushy love stories being dished out in the garb of entertainment. At the box-office, the impressive cast and the aggressive promotion have resulted in tremendous hype for the film, which in turn should translate into good business, keeping its investors smiling."

== Awards ==
Won

- Filmfare Best Villain Award – Ajay Devgn
- Star Screen Award Best Villain – Ajay Devgn
- Zee Cine Award Best Actor in a Negative Role – Ajay Devgn

Nominated

- Star Screen Award for Best Actor – Akshaye Khanna

== See also ==
- Nail Polish, 2021 Indian Hindi-language legal thriller drama film.
- Plot twist
