= Saathiya (film) =

2002 film by Shaad Ali

- Theatrical release poster
- Directed by: Shaad Ali
- Written by: Mani Ratnam
- Dialogues by: Gulzar
- Based on: Alaipayuthey by Mani Ratnam
- Produced by: Bobby Bedi
- Starring: Rani Mukerji; Vivek Oberoi
- Cinematography: Anil Mehta
- Edited by: A. Sreekar Prasad
- Music by: A. R. Rahman
- Production companies: Kaleidoscope Entertainment; Yash Raj Films
- Distributed by: Yash Raj Films
- Release date: 20 December 2002
- Running time: 139 minutes
- Country: India
- Language: Hindi
- Budget: ₹7.5 crore
- Box office: ₹29.1 crore

Saathiya (transl. Companion) is a 2002 Indian Hindi-language musical romantic drama film directed by Shaad Ali in his directorial debut, written by Mani Ratnam, and produced by Yash Raj Films and Kaleidoscope Entertainment. A remake of Ratnam's Alaipayuthey (2000), the film stars Rani Mukerji and Vivek Oberoi, with Sandhya Mridul, Tanuja, Satish Shah, Swaroop Sampat, and Sharat Saxena in supporting roles. The narrative follows Aditya and Suhani, a young couple who elope and marry despite parental opposition, only to find their relationship tested by personal struggles and a sudden tragedy.

The cinematography and editing were handled by Anil Mehta and A. Sreekar Prasad respectively. The soundtrack was composed by A. R. Rahman, who composed the music for the original film, with lyrics written by Gulzar. The music, particularly the title track "Saathiya" sung by Sonu Nigam, was particularly well received and went on to win several awards.

Saathiya was released theatrically on 20 December 2002, and received critical acclaim for its direction, performances, screenplay, and music. It emerged as a commercial success, earning ₹291 million (US$3.4 million) and ranking as the eighth highest-grossing Hindi film of the year.

At the 48th Filmfare Awards, Saathiya received eight nominations and won six awards, including Best Actress (Critics) (Mukerji), Best Screenplay (Ratnam), and Best Male Playback Singer (Sonu Nigam for "Saathiya").

== Plot ==
Aditya Sehgal is devastated when his wife, Suhani, goes missing following an argument over their faltering marriage. As he searches for her across Mumbai, the narrative shifts into a flashback tracing the evolution of their relationship.

Aditya first meets Suhani at a wedding and is immediately smitten. Despite initial hesitation, Suhani gradually reciprocates his feelings. However, their romance is strained by socio-economic differences—Aditya hails from a wealthy business family, while Suhani belongs to a middle-class household. When their parents disapprove, particularly after Aditya's father insults Suhani's father, the couple elopes and secretly marries.

Complications arise when Suhani reveals her marriage during a proposal for her elder sister, leading to her expulsion from her home. Simultaneously, Aditya's parents discover the truth and disown him. Isolated from their families, the couple begins a modest life in a small apartment, struggling with the realities of marriage, career pressures, and domestic responsibilities.

Tensions escalate after Suhani accuses Aditya of infidelity, resulting in a heated argument. Later that evening, Suhani is struck by a car while walking home, unbeknownst to Aditya. Believing she has left him in anger, he waits for her return.

After realizing she is missing, Aditya begins a city-wide search. He eventually learns that Suhani has been admitted to a hospital under a different name and is in critical condition. The driver responsible for the accident, IAS officer Yeshwant Rao, initially claims responsibility. However, his wife, Savitri, later reveals she was the actual driver, and Yeshwant had taken the blame to protect her.

As Suhani regains consciousness, Aditya rushes to her side, confessing the anguish he endured during her absence. Suhani reciprocates, and the two reconcile, reaffirming their love for each other.

== Cast ==
- Rani Mukerji as Suhani Sharma Sehgal
- Vivek Oberoi as Aditya Sehgal
- Sandhya Mridul as Dina Sharma, Suhani's sister
- Tanuja as Shobhna Sharma, Suhani's mother
- Satish Shah as Barrister Om Seghal, Aditya's father
- Swaroop Sampat as Shanti Seghal, Aditya's mother
- Sharat Saxena as Chandraprakash Sharma, Suhani's father
- Tinnu Anand as Daruwala
- Virendra Saxena as Jeevan
- Ujjwal Rana as Raghu
- Anju Mahendru as Prema
- Shehnaz Anand as Radha
- Chandrashekhar Gautam as Zafar
- Karl Katgara as Homi
- Kunal Kumar as Bhaskar
- Prerna Sharma as Prerna
- Pubali Sanyal as Anju
- Trishla Patel as Nancy
- Aarya Mehta as Chhoti
- Aditya Srivastava as ACP Aditya Singh Rathore
- Deepraj Rana as Police Inspector
- Jaya Bhattacharya as Vidya
- Karthik Kumar as Shyam
- Manu Rishi as Doctor
- Paritosh Sand as Ved
- Sanjay Mishra as Brij
- Vaishali Thakkar as Suhani's friend
- Vinay Apte as Senior Police Inspector
- Shamita Shetty as dancer in the song "Chori Chori" (special appearance)
- Shah Rukh Khan as Yeshwant Rao, IAS (cameo appearance)
- Tabu as Savitri Rao (cameo appearance)

== Production ==
=== Development ===
Saathiya marked the directorial debut of Shaad Ali, a former assistant of Mani Ratnam. Ali collaborated with lyricist Gulzar to adapt the screenplay and dialogues for a Hindi-speaking audience.

=== Casting ===
Shaad had initially intended for Abhishek Bachchan to play the lead role, however Bachchan declined the offer. The role was then given to Vivek Oberoi, who had recently gained recognition for his debut in Company, which released the same year. Rani Mukerji was cast as Suhani. Initially reluctant to take on the role due to her hesitation about remaking an acclaimed film, she eventually accepted after being persuaded by Aditya Chopra.

=== Filming ===
The film was primarily shot in Mumbai, with one song "Mere Yaar Milade" shot in Dhanushkodi, Tamil Nadu. Several songs, including “Saathiya” and “Chalka Chalka Re,” were filmed across urban and suburban locations in Mumbai, with a focus on natural lighting and handheld camerawork to enhance realism.

== Soundtrack ==
Saathiya

Soundtrack album by A. R. Rahman
- Released: 18 October 2002
- Recorded: Panchathan Record Inn
- Genres: Feature Film soundtrack, Ambient
- Length: 44:03
- Labels: YRF Music (digital); Saregama (physical)
- Producer: A. R. Rahman

A. R. Rahman chronology
Kadhal Virus (2002)	Saathiya (2002)	Parasuram (2003)

The soundtrack of Saathiya was composed by A. R. Rahman, with lyrics written by Gulzar. It features nine songs, most of which were adapted from Rahman's original compositions for Mani Ratnam’s Tamil film Alaipayuthey (2000). Two tracks, “Mere Yaar Mila De” and “Naina Milaike,” were newly composed for the Hindi version, replacing “Evano Oruvan” and “Alaipayuthey,” respectively. Rahman experimented with a blend of Carnatic influences and contemporary arrangements, incorporating classical, Sufi, and electronic elements.

The title track “Saathiya,” sung by Sonu Nigam, was particularly well-received and went on to win several awards. According to Box Office India, the Saathiya soundtrack was the second highest-selling Bollywood album of 2002, with approximately two million units sold—just behind Humraaz.

=== Reception ===
The music album was praised by music critics for its innovation and lyrical depth. Taran Adarsh of Bollywood Hungama described the music as “melodious and easy on the ears,” naming the title track as the standout. Cine Urban commended the digital sound mix and visual presentation of the songs in the film, while Mrbrown highlighted “Chhalka Chhalka Re,” “Chupke Se,” and “Aye Udi Udi Udi” as musical highlights. Glamsham wrote that Rahman created “a different genre of music” with a unique, upbeat sound that stood out among his contemporaries.

At the 48th Filmfare Awards, Saathiya won Best Music Director (A. R. Rahman) and Best Male Playback Singer (Sonu Nigam for “Saathiya”).

All tracks are written by Gulzar.

Saathiya
No.	Title	Singer(s)	Length
1.	"Saathiya"	Sonu Nigam, Clinton Cerejo	05:57
2.	"Chhalka, Chhalka Re"	Mahalaxmi Iyer, Vaishali Samant, Richa Sharma, Shoma	05:45
3.	"Aye Udi Udi"	Adnan Sami	04:36
4.	"Chupke Se"	Sadhana Sargam, Murtuza Khan, Qadir Khan	06:04
5.	"O Humdum Soniyo Re"	K K, Kunal Ganjawala, Shaan	03:57
6.	"Mere Yaar Mila De"	A. R. Rahman	05:43
7.	"Naina Milaike"	Sadhana Sargam, Madhushree	05:14
8.	"Maangalyam"	Srinivas, K. K., Kunal Ganjawala, Shaan	01:43
9.	"Chori Pe Chori" (Rap lyrics and vocals: Blaazé)	Asha Bhosle, Karthik	05:01
Total length:			44:03

== Reception ==
=== Box office ===
Saathiya emerged as a commercial success, earning approximately ₹291.5 million (US$3.4 million) worldwide. It ranked as the eighth highest-grossing Hindi film of the year.

==== India ====
In India, the film collected a net revenue of ₹152.55 million and a gross revenue of ₹247.1 million. The film had a strong opening, with a first-day collection of ₹5.3 million and a first-week total of ₹37.8 million.

==== Overseas ====
Internationally, Saathiya grossed approximately $925,000 (₹45.2 million). In the United States and Canada, the film earned $312,660.

=== Critical reception ===
Saathiya received generally positive reviews from critics, with praise directed towards its performances, direction, music, and realistic portrayal of romantic relationships. Several reviewers, however, noted issues with pacing and narrative consistency.

Writing for Nowrunning, Subhash K. Jha described the film as "a gentle study of love and marital blues in urban India" and praised its realistic tone and spontaneity. He commended Rani Mukerji and Vivek Oberoi for their "believable" performances, and highlighted the film's technical merits, particularly A. Sreekar Prasad’s editing and Anil Mehta’s cinematography, which he called "wonderfully chiselled and lively."

Sukanya Verma of Rediff.com noted that the film's simple narrative structure was effectively executed, avoiding unnecessary subplots. She appreciated director Shaad Ali’s focused storytelling and observed that the lead pair’s chemistry added emotional depth to the film.

Manish Gajjar of the BBC described the film as "a touching love story with a difference" and praised the lead performances, noting that "Oberoi shows great promise" and that Mukerji "plays the character with great conviction." He also lauded A. R. Rahman’s soundtrack as "melodious" and highlighted the film's direction and emotional tone.

In a review for Variety, David Rooney called the film "a slick, emotionally satisfying romantic drama." He praised the musical score by A. R. Rahman and described Mukerji's performance as "expressive," effectively capturing the transition from youthful romance to mature resilience. Rooney also cited the production values and cinematography as contributing to the film's overall appeal.

Udita Jhunjhunwala of Mid-Day commended Mukerji for her "understated" portrayal of Suhani, stating the role "fits her like a glove." She criticized the first half for "choppy editing and rushed pacing," and felt that the climax was "overly commercial," but acknowledged the film's emotional sincerity.

Taran Adarsh of Bollywood Hungama was more critical, rating the film 1.5 out of 5. He praised the soundtrack and cinematography but criticized the screenplay, stating that the second half "falls flat" and that the film "relies too heavily on its music to sustain interest."

== Accolades ==
The film received several accolades, including six Filmfare Awards, three IIFA Awards, three Screen Awards and four Zee Cine Awards

== Legacy ==
Saathiya is regarded as one of the more influential romantic dramas in Hindi cinema from the early 2000s. The film was noted for its realistic portrayal of post-marital conflict and for subverting conventional Bollywood tropes by not adhering to a traditional "happily ever after" narrative structure.

The film marked a significant milestone in Vivek Oberoi’s early career, becoming his third box-office success in his debut year following Company and Road. It also played a pivotal role in establishing Rani Mukerji as a leading actress in Hindi cinema. Although she had experienced only moderate success prior to Saathiya, her performance in the film was widely praised and is often cited as one of the most defining roles of her career.

The song “Chalka Chalka Re,” adapted from the original Tamil track “Yaaro Yaarodi” from Alaipayuthey (2000), gained renewed visibility when the original version was featured in the 2008 English-language romantic comedy The Accidental Husband.
