= Ismail Darbar =

Indian composer

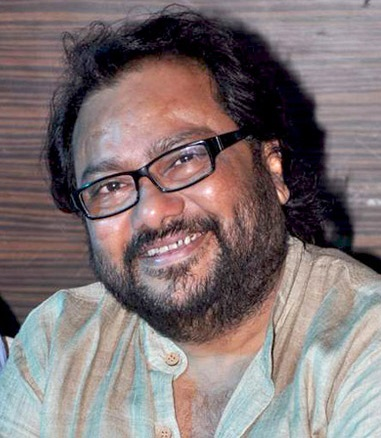
- Ismail Darbar at Vestoria fashion show

Background information
- Born: 1 June 1964 (age 62); Surat, Gujarat, India
- Genres: Indian classical; Bollywood; Filmi
- Occupations: Music director; violinist; instrumentalist; film score composer; singer
- Instruments: Violin

Ismail Darbar is an Indian film score composer, instrumentalist, singer, violinist and music director. He won the National Film Award for Best Music Direction for Hum Dil De Chuke Sanam (1999).

== Career ==
Ismail Darbar is from Surat, Gujarat. He worked for several years as a session violinist for leading music directors Laxmikant Pyarelal, Kalyanji Anandji, Bappi Lahiri, Rajesh Roshan, Anand–Milind, Nadeem-Shravan, Jatin–Lalit and A. R. Rahman. Finally, he got a break with Sanjay Leela Bhansali's film Hum Dil De Chuke Sanam. Earlier, Darbar had played violin for Jatin–Lalit in the movie Khamoshi: The Musical. Later, his music in Bhansali's Devdas was acclaimed. He did not work with Bhansali after Devdas due to personal differences. After Devdas, Darbar did a few more movies but without much success. In 2005, he composed for seven out of 12 tracks for Subhash Ghai's Kisna: The Warrior Poet after A. R. Rahman had left the project mid-way to complete an international assignment. However, Ghai would later say, "The music [of the film] has turned out so well that you can't distinguish an Ismail song from a Rahman one".

Darbar, Jatin–Lalit, Aadesh Shrivastava and Himesh Reshammiya were the four judges on Sa Re Ga Ma Pa Challenge 2005. Darbar was also a judge for Sa Re Ga Ma Pa Challenge 2007. He was also one of the three judges for Amul Star Voice of India 2 and Bharat Ki Shaan: Singing Star – Season 2 on DD National.

In 2007, Darbar released his first private music album, Rasiya Saajan, directed by S Ramachandran.

Darbar also appeared on season three of the reality series Bigg Boss which aired on Colors TV.

In 2018, Darbar co-composed his directorial debut film, Yeh Kaisa Tigdam, with Badshah (Nanu) Khan.

He entered state-level politics by joining BJP Gujarat in 2011.

== Awards ==
- R.D Burman awards in 1999
- National Film Award for Best Music Direction for Hum Dil De Chuke Sanam in 2000
- Worlds Amazing Talent in 2021

== Filmography ==
=== As music director ===
Year	Film title	Notes
1999	Hum Dil De Chuke Sanam	Won – National Film Award for Best Music Direction; Won – Filmfare RD Burman Award for New Music Talent; Nominated – Filmfare Award for Best Music Director
2000	Tera Jadoo Chal Gayaa	
2002	Deewangee	
2002	Devdas	Won – Screen Award for Best Music Director; Nominated – Filmfare Award for Best Music Director
2002	Desh Devi	
2002	Shakti: The Power	
2003	Baaz: A Bird in Danger	
2003	Vishnu	Telugu film
2005	Kisna: The Warrior Poet	
2006	Husn	
2006	Debojit	
2007	Rasiya Saajan	Private album
2008	Mehbooba	
2009	The Unforgettable	
2013	Mahabharat	Star Plus
2013	Kaanchi	
2014	Simran	
2014	Ek Tho Chance	Unreleased
2014	Gurudakshina	
2016	Santheyalli Nintha Kabira	Kannada film
2018	Yeh Kaisa Tigdam	Co-composed with Badshah (Nanu) Khan

== Controversies ==
Darbar became the subject of controversy when he accused A.R. Rahman of having bought the Academy Awards he won for the film Slumdog Millionaire (2008). Rahman denied the allegations, but decided not to file a lawsuit against Darbar.

On 2 February 2015, Darbar, his son Zaid Darbar and their associates were arrested for physically assaulting an assistant director, Prashamit Chaudhury, who had been employed by him earlier. Darbar refused to pay his due salaries and instead settled the score by assaulting his former employee.

== See also ==
- List of Indian film music directors
