= Company (2002 film) =

2002 Indian film by Ram Gopal Varma

- Film poster
- Directed by: Ram Gopal Varma
- Written by: Jaideep Sahni
- Produced by: Ram Gopal Varma; C. Aswini Dutt; Boney Kapoor
- Starring: Mohanlal; Ajay Devgn; Vivek Oberoi; Manisha Koirala; Antara Mali; Seema Biswas
- Narrated by: Makrand Deshpande
- Cinematography: Hemant Chaturvedi
- Edited by: Chandan Arora
- Music by: Sandeep Chowta
- Production companies: Varma Corporation; Vyjayanthi Movies; Bayview Projects LLP
- Distributed by: Eros International
- Release date: 12 April 2002
- Running time: 155 minutes
- Country: India
- Language: Hindi
- Budget: ₹9.5 crore
- Box office: ₹25.02 crore

Company is a 2002 Indian Hindi-language crime drama film directed by Ram Gopal Varma and written by Jaideep Sahni. The film stars Mohanlal, Ajay Devgn, Vivek Oberoi, Manisha Koirala, Antara Mali, and Seema Biswas. It marked Mohanlal's debut in Hindi cinema. It is the second instalment in Varma's Gangster trilogy. The film follows Chandu, a henchman of a gangster named Malik, with whom he forms a rapport that eventually falls apart after tension arises between them.

Varma conceived the idea of the film after meeting a man named Haneef, who had been in prison for five years after the 1993 Bombay bombings and was a close aid of the underworld don Dawood Ibrahim in his D-Company. Haneef told Varma about the fallout between Ibrahim and Chhota Rajan. Varma also had much information that he used in the film, especially about police procedures he could not use in Satya since it was too much for one film. The film was made in several locations in Mumbai, Mombasa, Nairobi, Hong Kong, and Switzerland. Hemant Chaturvedi served as the director of photography, while Chandan Arora edited the film.

Company was released on 12 April 2002 and received positive reviews from critics. It was commercially successful, grossing ₹25.02 crores against its production budget of ₹9.5 crores. It was screened at the Austin Film Festival, the New York Asian Film Festival, and the Fribourg International Film Festival. The film won six awards at the 48th Filmfare Awards, including Best Supporting Actor and Best Male Debut for Oberoi, Critics Best Actor for Devgn, and Critics Best Actress for Koirala. Several film critics have cited Company as one of Varma's best works.

== Plot ==
Chandrakant 'Chandu' Nagre joins the Mumbai underworld; he gradually learns the trade and increases the gang's profits, leading Malik, the leader of the gang, to take a liking to him. Malik goes on a bloody rampage, killing all of his rivals to take control of the underworld. Inspector Rathod, who once tortured and abused Chandu in jail, is killed with Malik's permission. During the execution of a contract killing, Malik and Chandu argue over the target; Chandu stops the deliberate vehicle crash and falls from Malik's favour.

The contract was taken out by a politician who tries to use Malik's gang to eliminate a popular candidate for the Home Minister's post. The assassination, a staged vehicle collision, takes place in spite of Chandu's objection after Malik, not relying on Chandu anymore, gives direct orders. The rift between Chandu and Malik widens. The Joint Commissioner of Mumbai Police, Veerappalli Sreenivasan, uses the rift to bring the mafia under control. Chandu and Malik become bitter enemies. After Chandu's retaliation for the assassination of Warsi, a lieutenant and Chandu's lifelong friend, two factions of Mumbai's once-powerful gang Company begin a full-scale war. Malik and Chandu kill as many members of their opponents' gangs as possible. Sreenivasan is criticised, but he and his men know that since many gang members are being killed, this war is making it easier for his department to dispose of Malik and Chandu.

The war results in an intense chase in Kenya, during which Malik hires assassins to kill Chandu, who is severely injured but survives. Sreenivasan persuades Chandu to come back to Mumbai and fight his war with Malik by helping the police bring the mafia under control. Chandu kills the politician who ordered the contract killing, in prison. Chandu and Malik come to a truce, but Chandu never withdraws his order to Koda Singh, one of his aids, to kill Malik. At the same time, Koda kills Malik at point-blank range in Hong Kong and is immediately arrested. After the assassination, Sreenivasan notifies Chandu, who is shocked at this news. Chandu then spends the rest of his life in prison after being persuaded by Sreenivasan to surrender.

== Cast ==
- Mohanlal as IG Veerappalli Srinivasan IPS, Commissioner of the Mumbai Police
- Ajay Devgn as N. Mallik
- Vivek Oberoi as Chandrakant "Chandru" Nagre
- Manisha Koirala as Saroja
- Seema Biswas as Ranibhai
- Antara Mali as Kannu
- Akash Khurana as Vilas Pandit
- Vijay Raaz as Koda Singh
- Rajpal Yadav as Joseph
- Shabbir Masani as David Khan
- Neeraj Vora as Sanam Khan
- Ashraful Haque as Krishnan
- Pankaj Jha as Anees
- Harsh Chhaya as Inspector Sawant
- Mukul Nag as Inspector Navlekar
- Rajesh Tandon as Gadgil
- Rajendra Sethi as Saeed
- Madan Joshi as Aslam Bhai
- Bharat Dabholkar as Home Minister Bharat Rahute
- Ganesh Yadav as Yadav
- Akshay Verma as Kenkare
- Mukesh Bhatt as Akram
- Isha Koppikar as item dancer in the song "Khallas" (special appearance)
- Urmila Matondkar as item dancer in the song "Gandha Hai" (special appearance)

== Production ==
=== Development ===
At a producer's house, director Ram Gopal Varma met a man named Haneef, who had been in prison for five years after the 1993 Bombay bombings. He was a close aide of gangster Dawood Ibrahim. Varma started talking to Haneef out of curiosity and his "obsession with the criminal psyche", who told him how the underworld operated. During that time, the media was circulating stories about the conflict between Ibrahim and Chhota Rajan, who had a fallout and wanted to kill each other, thus giving Varma the idea for Company. During his research for Satya (1998), Varma found out several things he could not incorporate into one film, especially the police procedures, because there was too much information.

Varma said he drew inspiration for the supporting characters and scenes from the staff of his own production company. He said Haneef's version of the underworld war gave him a story while his research gave him the "atmosphere". He found a strong resemblance with the rivalries between criminals and those between politicians because he felt "human nature is same everywhere". Varma was also inspired by the September 2000 attack on Rajan in Bangkok, which was perceived as the intelligence agencies pitting one gang against another. He later met several crime reporters, police officers and associates of gangsters regarding the research of the film. The film's screenplay was written by Jaideep Sahni.

=== Casting ===
Company marked Malayalam actor Mohanlal's debut in Hindi cinema. He portrayed IPS Veerapalli Srinivasan, a character based on the former Police Commissioner of Mumbai, Dhanushkodi Sivanandhan. Varma described the character as someone who looks heroic and "more like a professor and treats crime as a disease and criminals as patients". Kamal Haasan was first considered for the part, but Varma later replaced him with Mohanlal, feeling Haasan's "stylized" acting might not fit the raw and realistic tone he wanted for the film. Varma had first offered the role of Malik to Shah Rukh Khan. However, upon narrating the story to him, he felt that Khan's body language did not suit the character. Ajay Devgn was then finalized then for the role. Varma wanted to keep the mafia boss character calm and composed, which he based on Devgn's personality. Abhishek Bachchan was the initial choice for the role of Chandrakant Aangre, but declined due to other commitments at the time. Varma then cast newcomer Vivek Oberoi. Upon meeting Varma, who said he wanted to cast someone as a gangster living in a slum and told Oberoi he looked too good for the role, Oberoi asked Varma for 15 days, during which he stayed in the slums and slept on the floor. He rubbed oils and creams on his body, and sun-bathed daily to look darker for the role. He applied some mud to his face on the day of his meeting with Varma, and was eventually selected for the role of Chandru. Rinkle Khanna was cast as Saroja, but was replaced by Manisha Koirala a fews days into shooting.

=== Filming ===
Hemant Chaturvedi served as the director of photography and Chandan Arora edited the film. Location filming for the project took place in the slums of Mumbai, Mombasa, Nairobi, Hong Kong, and Switzerland. The film's prologue scene, in which eagles are flying over the city, was the final scene to be filmed. Varma asked his cameraman to take a few shots of the city to use as inserts. While he was filming, the eagles were flying; Varma said the footage reminded him of the opening scene of Mackenna's Gold (1969) and was "seized by the desire to somehow incorporate them in the film". Instead of using it as an exterior cut, he used it for the opening to "create drama". For the opening sequence, Varma wrote and used a fake informational voice-over about eagles waiting for months for their prey because it was "profound-sounding". Varma filmed the song "Khallas" hand-held with a camera "as a guest at a seedy disco where people find it difficult to move around" because he did not want to have a "picture-perfect composition".

== Soundtrack ==
Company: The Original Motion Picture Soundtrack

Soundtrack album by Sandeep Chowta
- Released: 15 February 2002
- Genre: Soundtrack
- Length: 39:02
- Label: T-Series
- Producer: Sandeep Chowta

The soundtrack album of Company was composed by Sandeep Chowta with lyrics written by Jaideep Sahni, Nitin Raikwar and Taabish Romani. The album contains eight tracks, two of which are instrumentals. The vocals were performed by Asha Bhosle, Sudesh Bhosle, Sapna Awasthi, Altaf Raja, Babul Supriyo, Sonali Vajpayee, Sowmya Raoh and Chowta. It was released on 15 February 2002 by T-Series.

The album met with mostly positive reviews. Taran Adarsh said the film "boasts of just one song, the immensely popular "Khallas", while the remaining songs form part of the background". Sheela Raval of India Today wrote that the songs seemingly blend with the film and said; "Even the sole song – "Khallas", lipsynched by the sexy Isha Koppikar – doesn't seem like a needless interjection". Jyoti Shukla of Rediff.com said "Khallas" is "out and out for front-benchers and breaks the tempo of the movie".

Track listing
No.	Title	Lyrics	Music	Singer(s)	Length
1.	"Khallas"	Nitin Raikwar	Sandeep Chowta	Asha Bhosle, Sudesh Bhosle, Sapna Awasthi	5:00
2.	"Tumse Kitna"	Taabish Romani	Sandeep Chowta	Altaf Raja	04:28
3.	"Pyar Pyar Mein"	Nitin Raikwar	Sandeep Chowta	Babul Supriyo, Sonali Vajpayee	04:51
4.	"Ankhon Mein"	Taabish Romani	Sandeep Chowta	Sowmya Raoh	05:13
5.	"Khallas Remix"	Nitin Raikwar	Sandeep Chowta	Asha Bhosle, Sudesh Bhosle, Sapna Awasthi	05:11
6.	"Gandha Hai"	Jaideep Sahni	Sandeep Chowta	Sandeep Chowta
7.	"A Shot of Company"	Instrumental	Sandeep Chowta	Instrumental	04:32
8.	"Malik's Soul"	Instrumental	Sandeep Chowta	Instrumental	6:19

== Release and reception ==
Company was released in India on 12 April 2002 in 295 screens, It was screened at the New York Asian Film Festival in 2003 in the Subway Cinema section for Asian films. followed by screenings at the Fribourg International Film Festival and the Austin Film Festival. The film was also screened retrospectively in 2006 at the Fantastic Fest, along with other Varma-produced films including Ab Tak Chhappan (2004), Ek Hasina Thi (2004) and Shiva (1990). Company was released in DVD format on 22 September 2006. It is also available on video-on-demand website ZEE5.

=== Critical response ===
Company received critical acclaim upon release. Taran Adarsh said the film has "a new language, a language that's even more hard-hitting when compared to its predecessors". He also praised Devgn's performance and said, "the actor takes to this complex character like a fish takes to water". Ziya Us Salam of Idlebrain.com called it "the kind of new century fare, which tells you to welcome a cinema with muted colours, snooping camera angles and almost unrelieved suspense", and added, "It is a grim film which lives in stilted frames, which thrives on silhouettes". Sheela Raval of India Today wrote that there is a "raw feel to the film but there are no rough edges ... given the amount of information Varma had collected on the subject and his desire to package it all in the three-hour plus production, the film almost ascends to the level of a well-made documentary".

Jyoti Shukla of Rediff.com called it a "fast-paced movie" that is "anchored by brilliant performances". She praised the performances of Mohanlal, Devgan and Oberoi, and said they are "a treat to watch". Derek Elley of Variety wrote; "By Bollywood standards, a dark and realistic look at the Mumbai underworld through the battle between a powerful don and his vengeful former sidekick, Company manages to cater to Hindi cinema norms while feeding the viewer something a little different." In 2010, Raja Sen wrote in his review; "This finely plotted duel between two gangsters left us battered, bruised and craving more".

=== Box office ===
Company was made on a production budget of ₹70 million (US$730,000). It opened to 100 per cent occupancy in Mumbai and grossed ₹11.8 million (US$120,000) on its opening day. It went on to collect ₹111 million (US$1.2 million) worldwide, which included ₹60.1 million (US$620,000) from the Indian box office, in its first week. The film's first-week theatre occupancy was 87 per cent in Delhi, Punjab, Hyderabad, and Nagpur. In its entire run, Company grossed ₹238 million (US$2.5 million) in India and ₹250 million (US$2.6 million) worldwide.

== Awards ==
At the 48th Filmfare Awards, Company won six awards: the Best Supporting Actor and Best Male Debut for Oberoi; Critics Award for Best Actor for Devgn (also for the film The Legend of Bhagat Singh) and Critics Award for Best Actress for Koirala; and the Best Story and Best Dialogue for Sahni. At the 4th IIFA Awards, the film won four awards: Best Supporting Actor for Vivek Oberoi; Best Story for Jaideep Sahni; Best Editing for Chandan Arora and Best Action for Allan Amin.

== Legacy ==
Several film critics have cited Company as one of Varma's best works. It was mentioned in Raja Sen's list of The Top 75 Films of the Decade in 2010. While reviewing Varma's 2008 film Contract, critic Rajeev Masand called Company, along with Satya, "one of the most influential films of the past ten years". It is considered one of the best technically superior films in Ram Gopal Varma's career. British director Danny Boyle cited Company and Satya as inspirations for his Academy Award-winning film Slumdog Millionaire (2008). He said the films "offer slick, often mesmerizing portrayals of the Mumbai underworld". Isha Koppikar established herself as the sex symbol of Bollywood with her Item Number Khallas. Company is the second film of Varma's Gangster series after Satya; it was followed by D (2005), which stars Randeep Hooda and was also produced by Varma.
