= List of awards and nominations received by Dolly Ahluwalia =

Dolly Ahluwalia awards and nominations
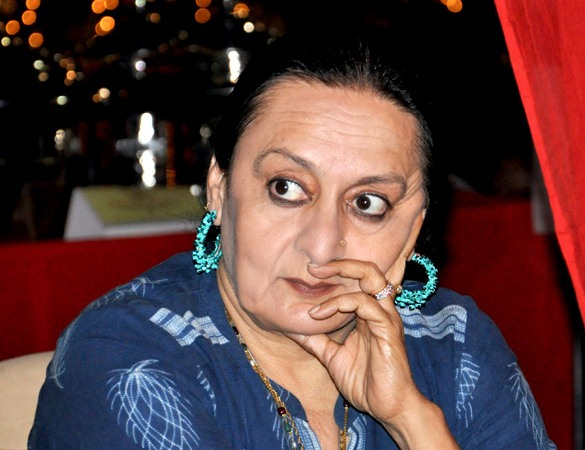
- Ahluwalia in 2013
Awards and nominations
Award	Wins	Nominations
National Film Awards	3	3
Filmfare Awards	3	4
IIFA	3	4
Genie Awards	0	3

Totals (Note: Certain award groups do not simply award one winner. They acknowledge several different recipients, have runners-up, and have third place. Since this is a specific recognition and is different from losing an award, runner-up mentions are considered wins in this award tally. For simplification and to avoid errors, each award in this list has been presumed to have had a prior nomination.)
- Wins: 11
- Nominations: 18

Dolly Ahluwalia is an Indian fashion designer and actress. She been awarded the National Film Award for Best Costume Design twice, for Bandit Queen (1996) and Haider (2015). She won the Filmfare Awards three times, for Omkara (2007), Bhaag Milkha Bhaag (2014), and Haider (2015).

== National Film Awards ==
Year	Category	Film	Result
1995	Best Costume Design	Bandit Queen	Won
2013	Best Supporting Actress	Vicky Donor	Won
2015	Best Costume Design	Haider	Won

== Filmfare Awards ==
The Filmfare Awards are one of the oldest and most prestigious Hindi film awards. They are presented annually by The Times Group for excellence of cinematic achievements. Dolly has three awards, the most awarded in this category.

Year	Category	Film	Result	Ref.
2007	Best Costume Design	Omkara	Won	
2013	Best Supporting Actress	Vicky Donor	Nominated	
2014	Best Costume Design	Bhaag Milkha Bhaag	Won	
2015	Best Costume Design	Haider	Won	
2018	Best Costume Design	Rangoon	Nominated	

== Zee Cine Awards ==
Year	Category	Film	Result
2013	Best Supporting Actress	Vicky Donor	Nominated

== IIFA Awards ==
Year	Category	Film	Result
2010	Best Costume Design	Love Aaj Kal (Shared with Anaita Shroff)	Won
2013	Best Supporting Actress	Vicky Donor	Nominated
2014	Best Costume Design	Bhaag Milkha Bhaag	Won
2015	Best Costume Design	Haider	Won

== Genie Awards ==
Year	Category	Film	Result
1993	Best Costume Design	The Burning Season	Nominated
2005	Best Costume Design	Water	Nominated
2007	Best Costume Design	Partition	Nominated

== Screen Awards ==
Year	Category	Film	Result
2013	Best Supporting Actress	Vicky Donor	Won

== Producers Guild Film Awards ==
Year	Category	Film	Result
2010	Best Costume Design	Love Aaj Kal	Nominated
2013	Best Supporting Actress	Vicky Donor	Won

== Screen Weekly Awards ==
Year	Category	Film	Result
2018	Best Costume Design	Rangoon	Won

== Times of India Film Awards ==
Year	Category	Film	Result
2012	Best Supporting Actress	Vicky Donor	Won
