= 41st Kerala State Film Awards =

Annual Indian film awards ceremony

- Awarded for: Best of Malayalam Cinema in 2010
- Date: 22 May 2011
- Location: Thiruvananthapuram
- Country: India
- Presented by: Kerala State Chalachitra Academy
- First award: 1969
- Website: http://www.keralafilm.com

The 41st Kerala State Film Awards for the Malayalam film industry were announced and presented on 22 May 2011.

== Winners ==
Name of Award	Awardee(s)	Name of Film	Remarks
Best Film	ProducerDirector: Salim Ahmed	Adaminte Makan Abu	
Second Best Film	Producer B Rakesh. Director: Lenin Rajendran	Makaramanju	
Best Director	Shyamaprasad	Elektra	
Best Actor	Salim Kumar	Adaminte Makan Abu	
Best Actress	Kavya Madhavan	Khaddama	
Second Best Actor	Biju Menon	T. D. Dasan Std. VI B	
Second Best Actress	Mamta Mohandas	Katha Thudarunnu	
Best Comedian	Suraj Venjaramoodu	Oru Naal Varum	
Best Child Artist	Krishna Pathmakumar	Janaki	
Best Story	Mohan Sharma	Gramam	
Best Cinematography	Shehnad Jalal; M J Radhakrishnan	Chitrasoothram, Veettilekkulla Vazhi	
Best Screenplay	Salim Ahamed	Adaminte Makan Abu	
Best Editor	Sobin K Soman	Pakarnnattam	
Best Lyrics	Rafeeq Ahamed	Sadgamaya	for the song Oru pooviniyum vidarum..
Best Music Director	M. Jayachandran	Karayilekku Oru Kadal Dooram	for the song Chithra salabhame..
Best Male Playback Singer	Hariharan	Paattinte Palazhy	for the song Pattu patuvvan mathram..
Best Female Playback Singer	Rajalakshmy	Janakan	for the song Olichirunne..
Best Background Score	Isaac Thomas Kottukapally	Adaminte Makan Abu Veettilekkulla Vazhi	
Best Film with Popular Appeal and Aesthetic Value	Producer and Director: Ranjith	Pranchiyettan and The Saint	
Best Debut Director	Mohan Raghavan	T. D. Dasan Std. VI B	
Best Makeup Artist	Pattanam Rasheed	Yugapurushan	
Best Costume Designer	S. B. Satheeshan	Yugapurushan, Makaramanju	
Best Choreography	Madhu Gopinath, Vakkom Sajeev	Makaramanju	
Best Sound Recordist	Shubdeep Sen Guptha	Chitrasutram	
Best Dubbing Artist	Rizabawa	Karmayogi	For Thalaivasal Vijay
Best Dubbing Artist	Praveena	Elektra	For Manisha Koirala
Special Jury Mention	Premlal	Aathmakatha	Direction
Special Jury Mention	Thalaivasal Vijay	Yugapurushan	Acting

== See also ==
- National Film Awards
