= IIFA Award for Best Costume Design =

Annual film award in India

The IIFA Award for Best Costume Design is a technical award, chosen ahead of the ceremonies, at the annual International Indian Film Academy Awards.

== Multiple wins ==
Wins	Recipient
5	Manish Malhotra
3	Neeta Lulla, Dolly Ahluwalia
2	Karan Johar, Anaita Shroff Adajania

== Awards ==
The winners are listed below:

Year	Winner	Film
2017	Manish Malhotra	Ae Dil Hai Mushkil
2016	Anju Modi & Maxima Basu	Bajirao Mastani
2015	Dolly Ahluwalia	Haider
2014	Dolly Ahluwalia	Bhaag Milkha Bhaag
2013	Aki Narula & Shefalina	Barfi!
2012	Niharika Khan	The Dirty Picture
2011	Niharika Khan	Band Baaja Baaraat
2010	Anaita Shroff Adajania, Dolly Ahluwalia	Love Aaj Kal
2009	Neeta Lulla	Jodhaa Akbar
2008	Manish Malhotra, Karan Johar, Sanjiv Mulchandani	Om Shanti Om
2007	Anaita Shroff Adajania	Dhoom 2
2006	Subarna Ray Chaudhuri	Parineeta
2005	Vikram Phadnis	Mujhse Shaadi Karogi
2004	Manish Malhotra	Kal Ho Naa Ho
2003	Reza Shariffi, Sandeep Khosla, Neeta Lulla, Abu Jani	Devdas
2002	Manish Malhotra	Kabhi Khushi Kabhie Gham
2001	Manish Malhotra and Karan Johar	Mohabbatein
2000	Neeta Lulla	Taal

== See also ==
- IIFA Awards
- Bollywood
- Cinema of India
