= Basharat Peer =

Kashmiri-American journalist, commentator and author

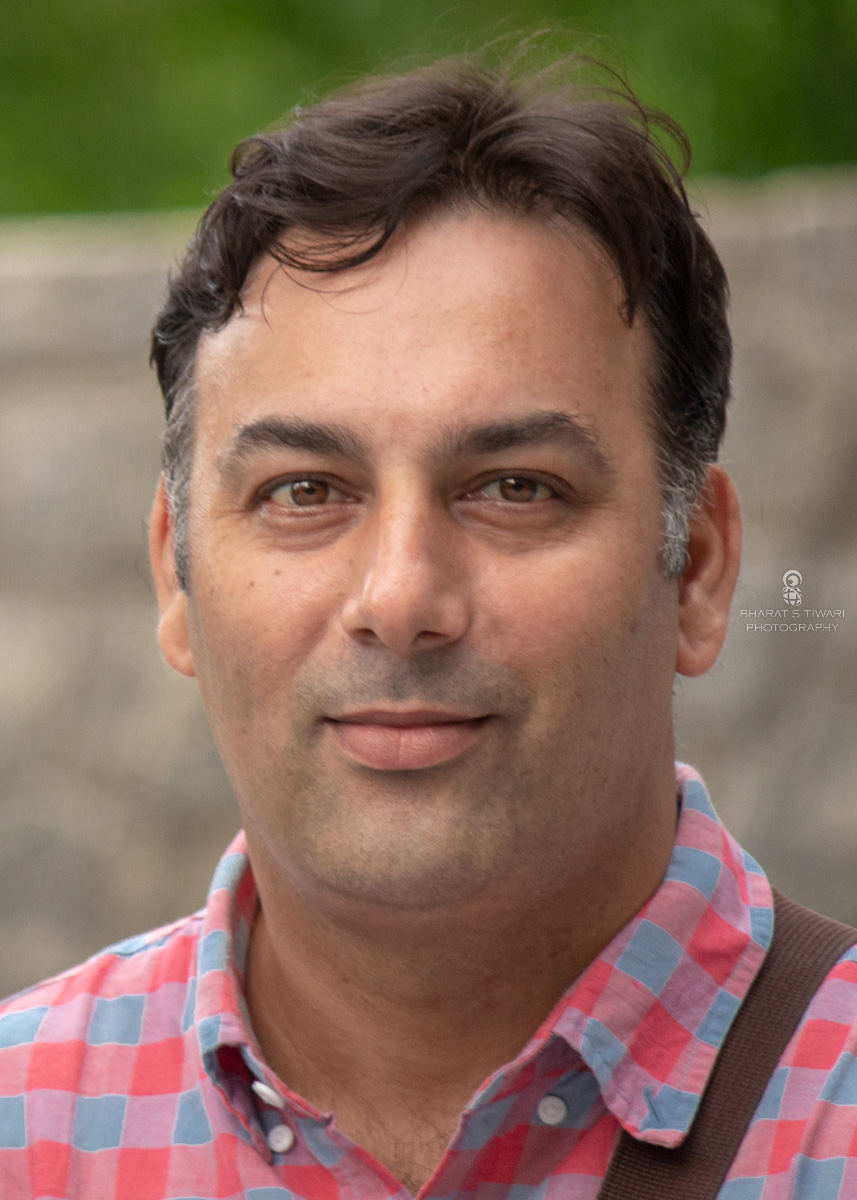
- Peer in 2017
- Born: c. 1977; Seer Hamdan, Jammu and Kashmir, India
- Education: JNV Anantnag; Aligarh Muslim University; University of Delhi; Columbia University
- Occupations: Journalist, author, political commentator
- Notable credits: Curfewed Night (2008); Haider (2014); A Question of Order (2017)
- Spouse: Ananya Vajpeyi (m. 2013)

Basharat Peer (born 1977) is an Indian journalist, script writer, and author.

Peer spent his early youth in the Kashmir Valley before shifting to Aligarh and then, Delhi for higher education. In August 2006, he relocated from India to New York City in the United States, where he is currently based as an opinion-editor at The New York Times.

== Biography ==
=== Early and personal life ===
Peer was born in Seer Hamdan area of south Kashmir’s Anantnag district of the erstwhile Indian state of Jammu and Kashmir into a Kashmiri Muslim family. He did his early schooling from Jawahar Navodaya Vidyalaya Aishmuqam, an educational institution located near the city of Anantnag, and attended Aligarh Muslim University as well as the University of Delhi for higher education in the fields of political science and law, respectively. Peer also attended the Graduate School of Journalism at Columbia University in the United States.

Peer's father is a retired officer of the Jammu and Kashmir Administrative Service. He married Ananya Vajpeyi—a Delhi-based academician of Hindu–Sikh background—in 2013, following an eight-year-long courtship.

=== Career ===
Peer started his career as a reporter at Rediff and Tehelka. In his early career he was based in Delhi. He has worked as an Assistant Editor at Foreign Affairs and was a Fellow at Open Society Institute, New York. He was a Roving Editor at The Hindu. He has written extensively on South Asian politics for Granta, Foreign Affairs, The Guardian, FT Magazine, The New Yorker, The National and The Caravan.

He is the author of Curfewed Night, an eyewitness account of the Kashmir conflict, which won the Crossword Prize for Non-Fiction and was chosen among the Books of the Year by The Economist and The New Yorker. Peer ran the "India Ink" blog on the digital edition of The New York Times.

Peer was the script writer along with Vishal Bhardwaj for the 2014 Bollywood film Haider, in which he also made a special appearance. He is also known for his literary pieces. His open letter to Indians under the title of "Letter to an Unknown Indian" started a literary debate on the Kashmir dispute.

In 2025, Peer's reporting on migrant workers during the COVID-19 pandemic was adapted into the film Homebound, directed by Neeraj Ghaywan. The film premiered at the 2025 Cannes Film Festival.

== See also ==
- List of Indian writers
- Mirza Waheed
