= S. B. Satheeshan =

Indian costume designer

S. B. Satheesan
- Occupation: Costume designer
- Years active: 1995 – present
- Awards: National Film Awards: Best Costume Designer (1998); Kerala State Awards: Best Costume Designer (1997, 1998, 2007, 2012)

S. B. Satheesan is a national award-winning Indian costume designer or fashion designer working predominantly in Malayalam films.

== Early career ==
Satheeshan grew up in Chemboor, near Venjaramoodu, Kerala. He trained with a neighbourhood tailor and started a tailoring shop named 'S.B. Stichings' at Chemboor. He was discovered by Mayalam film producer Adoor Gopalakrishnan who saw his costume designs in a local theatrical production and hired him to work on Kathapurushan.

== Filmography ==
Year	Film	Language	Director	Notes
1995	Kathapurushan	Malayalam	Adoor Gopalakrishnan	
1997	Guru (1997 film)	Malayalam	Rajiv Anchal	
1998	Daya	Malayalam	Venu (cinematographer)	
1998	Summer in Bethlehem	Malayalam	Sibi Malayil	
1999	Ustaad	Malayalam	Sibi Malayil	
2000	Devadoothan	Malayalam	Sibi Malayil	
2002	Nizhalkkuthu	Malayalam	Adoor Gopalakrishnan	
2004	Black (2004 film)	Malayalam	Ranjith (director)	
2005	Athbhutha Dweepu	Malayalam	Vinayan	
2005	Anandabhadram	Malayalam	Santosh Sivan	
2005	Rajamanikyam	Malayalam	Anwar Rasheed	
2006	Classmates (2006 film)	Malayalam	Lal Jose	
2007	Before the Rains	English	Santosh Sivan	
2007	Naalu Pennungal	Malayalam	Adoor Gopalakrishnan	
2007	Goal (2007 Malayalam film)	Malayalam	Kamal (director)	
2008	Madambi	Malayalam	B. Unnikrishnan	
2008	Thalappavu	Malayalam	Madhupal	
2008	Thirakkatha	Malayalam	Ranjith (director)	
2009	I Love Me	Malayalam	B. Unnikrishnan	
2009	Ee Pattanathil Bhootham	Malayalam	Johny Antony	
2010	Apoorvaragam	Malayalam	Sibi Malayil	
2010	Pramani	Malayalam	B. Unnikrishnan	
2010	Kadaksham	Malayalam	Sasi Paravoor	
2010	Ringtone (film)	Malayalam	Ajmal	
2010	Yugapurushan	Malayalam	R.Sukumaran	
2011	Dam999	English	Sohan Roy	
2011	Snehaveedu	Malayalam	Sathyan Anthikad	
2011	Sevenes	Malayalam	Joshiy	
2011	Kanakompathu	Malayalam	Mahadevan	
2011	Doubles (2011 film)	Malayalam	Sohan Seenulal	
2011	Traffic (2011 film)	Malayalam	Rajesh Pillai	
2012	Puthiya Theerangal	Malayalam	Sathyan Anthikad	
2013	Celluloid (film)	Malayalam	Kamal (director)	
2013	Oru Indian Pranayakadha	Malayalam	Sathyan Anthikad	
2013	Nadan	Malayalam	Kamal (director)	
2013	Oru Yathrayil	Malayalam	Major Ravi	
2013	Sringaravelan	Malayalam	Jose Thomas	
2013	Daivathinte Swantham Cleetus	Malayalam	G.Marthandan	
2013	Red Wine	Malayalam	Salam Bappu	
2014	The Dolphins	Malayalam	Diphan	
2014	Njaan	Malayalam	Ranjith (director)	
2014	RajadhiRaja	Malayalam	Cheran (director)	
2014	Apothecary (film)	Malayalam	Madhav Ramadasan	
2014	Mr. Fraud	Malayalam	B. Unnikrishnan	
2014	My Dear Mummy	Malayalam	Mahadevan	
2014	1 by Two	Malayalam	Arun Kumar Aravind	
2014	Ring Master	Malayalam	Rafi Mecartin	
2015	Ennum Eppozhum	Malayalam	Sathyan Anthikad	
2015	Mili (2015 film)	Malayalam	Rajesh Pillai	
2016	Motorcycle Diaries (film)	Malayalam	Rajesh Pillai	
2019	Mamangam	Malayalam	M. Padmakumar	

== Awards ==
Kerala State Film Award

- 1997 Kerala State Film Award for Best Costume Designer - Guru
- 1998 Kerala State Film Award for Best Costume Designer - Daya
- 1999 Kerala State Film Award for Best Costume Designer- Rishivamsam
- 2000 Kerala State Award for Best Costume Designer- Devadoothan
- 2002 Kerala State Award for Best Costume Designer-Nizhalkuthu
- 2005 Kerala State Award for Best Costume Designer-Athbutha dweep
- 2007 Kerala State Film Award for Best Costume Designer - Naalu Pennungal
- 2010 Kerala State Film Award for Best Costume designer- Yugapushan, Makaramanju
- 2012 Kerala State Film Award for Best Costume Designer - Celluloid, ozhimuri

National Film Award

- 1998 National Film Award for Best Costume Design - Daya
