= Dhamaal (disambiguation) =

Dhamaal is a 2007 Indian Hindi-language comedy film.

Dhamaal or Dhamal may also refer to:

- Dhamaal (film series), including Dhamaal, Double Dhamaal and Total Dhamaal
- Chang dance, or Dhamal, a folk dance from Rajasthan, India
- Dhamail or dhamal, a form of Bengali folk music and dance
- Dhamal, a form of Sufi whirling practised in Pakistan

== See also ==
- Dumhal, a dance of Jammu and Kashmir, India
- Damal (film)
- Dhamaal Express, an Indian television show
