= Devdas (2002 Hindi film) =

2002 Indian film by Sanjay Leela Bhansali

- Theatrical release poster
- Directed by: Sanjay Leela Bhansali
- Written by: Prakash Ranjit Kapadia; Sanjay Leela Bhansali
- Based on: Devdas by Sarat Chandra Chattopadhyay
- Produced by: Bharat Shah
- Starring: Shah Rukh Khan; Aishwarya Rai; Madhuri Dixit
- Narrated by: Shah Rukh Khan
- Cinematography: Binod Pradhan
- Edited by: Bela Sehgal
- Music by: Songs: Ismail Darbar; Score: Monty Sharma
- Production company: Mega Bollywood
- Distributed by: Eros International
- Release dates: 23 May 2002 (Cannes Film Festival); 12 July 2002 (India)
- Running time: 184 minutes
- Country: India
- Language: Hindi
- Budget: ₹50 crore
- Box office: ₹168 crore

Devdas (Hindi: देवदास) is a 2002 Indian Hindi-language epic historical romance drama directed by Sanjay Leela Bhansali who co-wrote the screenplay with Prakash Ranjit Kapadia adapted from the Bengali-language 1917 novel by Sarat Chandra Chattopadhyay. It stars Shah Rukh Khan, Aishwarya Rai and Madhuri Dixit in lead roles, with Jackie Shroff, Kirron Kher, Smita Jaykar, and Vijayendra Ghatge in supporting roles. The film narrates the story of Devdas Mukherjee (Khan), a wealthy law graduate who returns from London to marry his childhood friend, Parvati "Paro" (Rai). However, the rejection of their marriage by his own family sparks his descent into alcoholism, ultimately leading to his emotional deterioration and him seeking refuge with the golden-hearted courtesan Chandramukhi (Dixit).

Bhansali was inspired to remake the novel into a film after reading it for a second time, and announced the project in November 1999. The screenplay was written by him and Prakash Ranjit Kapadia, who also wrote the dialogue. Nitin Chandrakant Desai built the sets between August 2000 and May 2001, spending ₹200 million (US$4.12 million). Along with Bhansali and other crews, he did extensive research on Calcuttan building design from the period of the British Raj. Principal photography was handled by Binod Pradhan from November 2000 to April 2002, taking place in Bikaner, Film City, and Filmistan. While Ismail Darbar and Birju Maharaj composed the soundtrack, Monty Sharma composed the background score.

Devdas is featured in Out of Competition section at the 2002 Cannes Film Festival on 23 May 2002 and was released worldwide on 12 July that year. It was the most expensive Indian film ever made at the time, with a budget of ₹500 million (US$10.29 million). The film received mixed reviews when it premiered at Cannes, but was better received when it was theatrically released. The film was a major commercial success and emerged as the highest-grossing Indian film of the year, earning approximately ₹1.68 billion ($35 million) worldwide. It won several accolades, including 5 awards at the 50th National Film Awards, including Best Popular Film Providing Wholesome Entertainment and Best Female Playback Singer (Shreya Ghoshal for "Bairi Piya"). At the 48th Filmfare Awards, it won a record-setting 11 awards, including Best Film, Best Director (Bhansali), Best Actor (Khan), Best Actress (Rai) and Best Supporting Actress (Dixit). It was also nominated for the BAFTA Award for Best Film Not in the English Language. Over the years the film has grown a cult following and considered an all time classic in Indian cinema.

== Plot ==
In the early 1900s, Kausalya Mukherjee prepares for the return of her son, Devdas, after a ten-year legal education in London. The news brings immense joy to their neighbor, Sumitra, whose daughter, Parvati "Paro," was Devdas's inseparable childhood companion. Before his departure, Paro had lit a ceremonial lamp, vowing never to let it extinguish until his return. Upon Devdas's arrival, their rekindled companionship quickly matures into a deep, reciprocal love. However, Kausalya strongly disapproves of the match due to social stratification, viewing Paro’s maternal lineage of nautch dancers and street performers as beneath their aristocratic zamindar status, a bias actively stoked by Devdas' manipulative sister-in-law, Kumud.

During a family celebration, Sumitra publicly proposes a matrimonial alliance between Devdas and Paro. Kausalya arrogantly rejects the offer, humiliating Sumitra by mocking her lower social standing. Seeking closure, Paro secretly meets Devdas at his estate, but they are discovered by Devdas' rigid father, Narayan, who inflicts further public disgrace upon her. Lacking the moral courage to defy his patriarchal household, an overwhelmed Devdas flees to Calcutta and sends a letter to Paro, callously urging her to forget him and claiming he never loved her. Heartbroken and betrayed, Paro agrees to an arranged marriage with Bhuvan Choudhry, a wealthy, aristocratic widower with three adult children.

Regretting his cowardice, Devdas returns to stop Paro's wedding, but she fiercely reprimands him for his abandonment and proceeds with the nuptials. Following her departure, Bhuvan candidly informs Paro that she was wed solely to preside over his vast estate, as his emotional devotion belongs entirely to his deceased first wife. Paro stoically accepts her domestic duties but remains emotionally tethered to Devdas. Meanwhile, an unmoored Devdas succumbs to an existential spiral of alcoholism. His companion, Chunnilal, introduces him to Chandramukhi, a glamorous and deeply empathetic courtesan. Chandramukhi falls profoundly in love with Devdas's tortured soul, transforming her kotha into his permanent sanctuary as his health deteriorates.

Family dynamics fracture further when Narayan dies, leaving Devdas completely estranged from his mother due to Kumud's ongoing machinations. Seeking to intervene, Paro confronts Chandramukhi over Devdas's terminal addiction but relents upon recognizing the courtesan's genuine, selfless devotion. Paro invites Chandramukhi to her estate's Durga Puja celebration, concealing her profession to protect her. However, Kalibabu, Bhuvan's vindictive son-in-law and a patron of Chandramukhi's brothel, exposes her identity. Chandramukhi courageously defends her dignity before leaving, but Kalibabu uses the incident to reveal Paro’s past romance with Devdas to Bhuvan, who responds by permanently confining Paro to the mansion.

Now suffering from terminal liver failure, a dying Devdas boards a train to fulfill a long-standing promise to see Paro one last time before he dies. He collapses outside the gates of her marital manor. Spotting him, Paro desperately sprints across the vast courtyard to reach him. Recognizing her, Bhuvan commands his guards to lock the compound. The massive iron gates slam shut just before Paro can cross the threshold. Trapped inside, Paro weeps in agony as a fading Devdas whispers her name and succumbs to his illness, causing her eternal childhood lamp to finally flicker out.

== Cast ==
- Shah Rukh Khan as Devdas Mukherjee
- Aishwarya Rai as Parvati "Paro" Chaudhary (née Chakraborty)
- Madhuri Dixit as Chandramukhi
- Jackie Shroff as Chunnilal
- Kirron Kher as Sumitra Chakraborty, Paro's mother
- Smita Jaykar as Kaushalya Mukherjee, Devdas' mother
- Manoj Joshi as Dwijdas Mukherjee, Devdas' older brother
- Ananya Khare as Kumud Mukherjee, Devdas' sister-in-law
- Milind Gunaji as Kalibabu
- Dina Pathak as Bhuvan's mother
- Vijayendra Ghatge as Bhuvan Chaudhry
- Tiku Talsania as Dharamdas
- Jaya Bhattacharya as Manorama
- Sunil Rege as Neelkanth Chakraborty
- Vijay Crishna as Narayan Mukherjee, Devdas' father
- Amardeep Jha as Kalibabu's mother
- Apara Mehta as Badi Aapa
- Muni Jha as Kaka
- Radhika Singh as Yashomati
- Disha Vakani as Sakhi
- Ava Mukherjee as Devdas's grandmother

== Production ==
=== Development ===
Devdas is the third Hindi remake of the 1917 Bengali novel of the same name by Sarat Chandra Chattopadhyay, following the 1936 and 1955 versions. The director Sanjay Leela Bhansali read the novel for a second time and decided to adapt it. When asked by a Times of India interviewer about why he based the film on the novel, he said that it was "the most widely read story", and added, "I thought it would be a fascinating challenge for me [...] to present already known and loved characters, in my very own way, with my perspective." He wanted to make this remake was "bigger, better and more spectacular than any classical movie made in Indian cinema". He explained how the novel Devdas has "a simple story [and] a soul which was so big", and confessed that he was motivated "to do justice to this, it had to be made with grandeur and opulence". He stated that it was his interpretation of the novel and "a tribute to a great story that transcends sexual love and makes emotion its hero."

Bhansali, who had wanted to make a film that has grandeur and grace, spoke of his love to the film "as much as Devdas loved his Paro. I have put more sincerity and passion into Devdas than my other two films [Khamoshi: The Musical (1996) and Hum Dil De Chuke Sanam (1999)] put together". He described the novel's main character, also named Devdas, as "the paradox of a man who was [...] like a child, utterly lovable", believing that it "exists in every male, especially every Indian male". In an interview with Man's World magazine, he found a resemblance between the character and his father, who directed the 1965 action film Lootera, starring Dara Singh. He saw Devdas "as a man who is so passionate about his love that it eventually consumes his entire being". He revealed that his father often narrates the novel's story to him, and he read it entirely for the first time at the age of 17. Furthermore, Bhansali claimed that he only altered the presentation style of the 1955 version by the director Bimal Roy, with retaining its essence.

The first news about Devdas appeared in an article written by Bhawana Somaaya for The Hindu in November 1999. It was produced (and financed) by the industrialist Bharat Shah under his production company, Mega Bollywood. The screenplay was written by Bhansali with Gujarati playwright and television series writer Prakash Ranjit Kapadia, who also wrote the dialogue. The distribution was handled by Eros International directly in India, the United Kingdom and the United States. In May 2002, after negotiations with companies such as Pathé and Fortissimo Films for world sales and Miramax Films for distribution rights in the United States and United Kingdom, Eros assigned Focus Features as the sales agent outside the United States and India, including the United Kingdom and France in collaboration with Eros. However, in November the same year, Eros reclaimed these rights from Focus after months of negotiations for them and planned to sell remaining rights at the MIFED (Mercato internazionale del film e del documentario) market; the companies had jointly handled sales in France, Switzerland, Greece, Australia and North Korea in the interim. Bhansali included several novelties on its plot, as he had a desire to make it different from its predecessors; for instance, in the novel, Devdas returns from his studies in Calcutta (present-day Kolkata), while in the film's version, he is shown finishing his studies in London. In June 2000, the film faced controversy when another producer, K. Chopra, had registered a film with the same title. Bhansali, however, was able to successfully get the title.

=== Casting ===
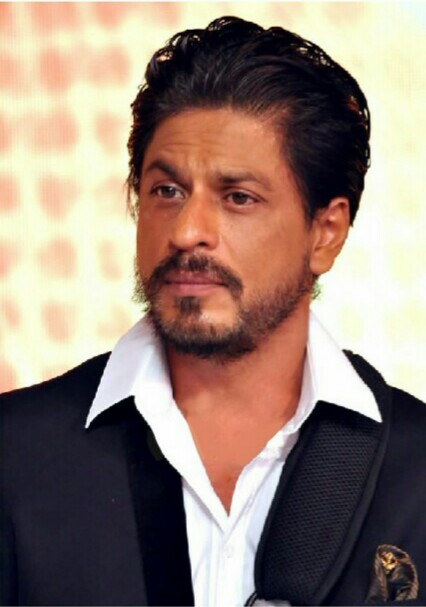
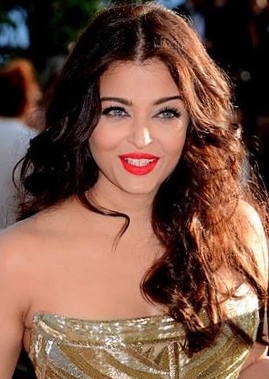
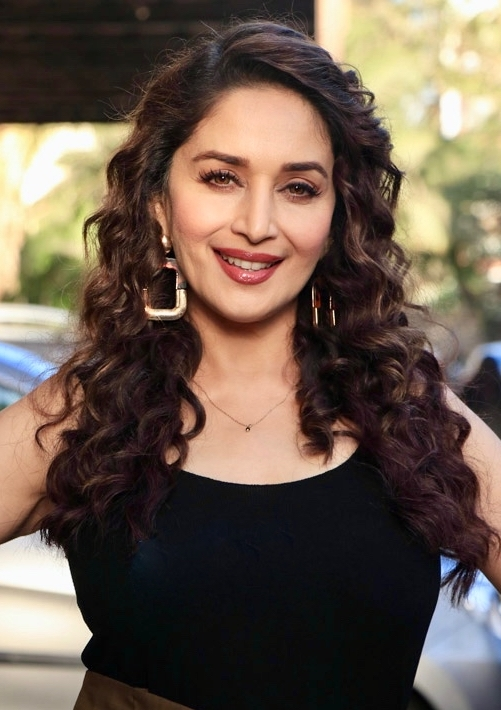
The lead actors of Devdas: Shah Rukh Khan, Aishwarya Rai, and Madhuri Dixit (l-r)

Shah Rukh Khan, Aishwarya Rai, and Madhuri Dixit were cast as the lead actors. At the same time when the film's first report appeared, it was reported that Bhansali tried to offer Dixit the role of Chandramukhi, a part written specifically for her. She declined it because of her marriage to the cardiovascular surgeon Shriram Madhav Nene on 17 October 1999, but eventually accepted it in September 2000. She said of her excitement about the collaboration: "Working with Sanjay was a dream. He gives you a lot of scope and leeway with the role's interpretation. Since he has the whole film worked out in his mind, he is aware of the length of the scene. He knows exactly what he wants from each scene in order to keep the storyline crisp."

Devdas marked the third film between Khan and Rai, after the romantic films Josh (2000) and Mohabbatein (2000). The former features as Devdas, a Bachelor of Law student who later being an alcoholic, which was originally offered to Salman Khan. Bhansali approached him in February 2000, following the release of Khan's Phir Bhi Dil Hai Hindustani (2000). Having watched his performances while assisting Vidhu Vinod Chopra in 1942: A Love Story (1994), Bhansali stated that he was "extremely happy" after Shah Rukh Khan accepted to star in the film. Meanwhile, the latter was given with the role of Paro, Devdas' childhood friend, the next month; this was the second collaboration between her and Bhansali, following Hum Dil De Chuke Sanam. She first heard the story of the novel when he narrated the film's script to her. Prior to her, several actresses were offered to play the role, including Kajol and Kareena Kapoor. Working with Bollywood well-known stars was a new experience for her, who was a newcomer at the time after debuted in Mani Ratnam's Tamil political film Iruvar (1997) and she said, "[...] so the fact that this was an opportunity to work with them on a big scale was one of the immediate attractions."

The supporting cast includes Kirron Kher, Smita Jaykar, and Vijayendra Ghatge. In August 2000, Kher was cast as Paro's mother, Sumitra. She had always wanted to work with Bhansali after sees his work in Khamoshi: The Musical and Hum Dil De Chuke Sanam, and met him at the 50th Berlin International Film Festival when the screening of her film, the drama Bariwali, in 2000. He offered Kher two roles, Sumitra and Devdas' mother Kaushalya, but the director suggested her to choose the former role. In an interview with Rediff.com, she described the role as "a very definite character, never seen on the big screen before", and found it to be different compared with other mother roles from any films. She also felt that it gave her "a lot of scope to perform—from a flamboyant, young and larger-than-life character." Kher later positively spoke of her rapport with him: "What made me keen on working with him was the bound script that he gave me and the unusual characterisation of Sumitra."

Jaykar, who was also offered with both roles, chose to play Kaushalya. Jaykar explained that she had portrayed similar roles before, and believed that they were "very bechari [hopeless] [...] lots of soulful crying". A second collaboration with Bhansali subsequent to his previous venture, she confessed, "The look of this film is different from that of Hum Dil De Chuke Sanam. It is richer, more opulent." Ghatge portrays Paro's husband Bhuvan, a forty-old-year zamindar; he said that Bhansali initially wanted him to play a role opposite Kher (he did not mention specifically). Discussing his role, Ghatge stated, "What I like about my character is that he comes from a noble lineage. There is a dignity, a grace in him that appealed to me." Ghatge compared the film to two Kamal Amrohi's historical films—Pakeezah (1972) and Razia Sultan (1983)—and noted how Devdas "is the only other lavish film I have ever seen". Vijay Chrisna got the role of Narayan, Devdas' father, and he was sure Bhansali offered him it because of his age factor.

In October 2000, Jackie Shroff joined the cast and made an extended cameo appearance, playing Devdas' friend Chunnilal, a role that was declined by Govinda, Manoj Bajpayee, and Saif Ali Khan.

=== Sets ===
The production design of Devdas led by Nitin Chandrakant Desai (Bhansali's collaborator in Hum Dil De Chuke Sanam), with between sixty and one hundred assistants, including Pune-based architect Dheeraj Alkokar, helped him in several constructions. Bhansali wanted the sets to be different from the novel's 1936 and 1955 Hindi remakes and, to fulfill his request, Desai visited the National Film Archive of India to collect the photographs of the previous remake versions and "to be sure that there is no duplication". As the film is set in the 1900s, Bhansali, Desai and other crews did extensive research and discussions on house design from the period of the British Raj in Calcutta and Indian culture at the time. After this research, Desai came up with the first four different set designs: Paro's haveli and mansion, Devdas' house, and Chandramukhi's brothel.

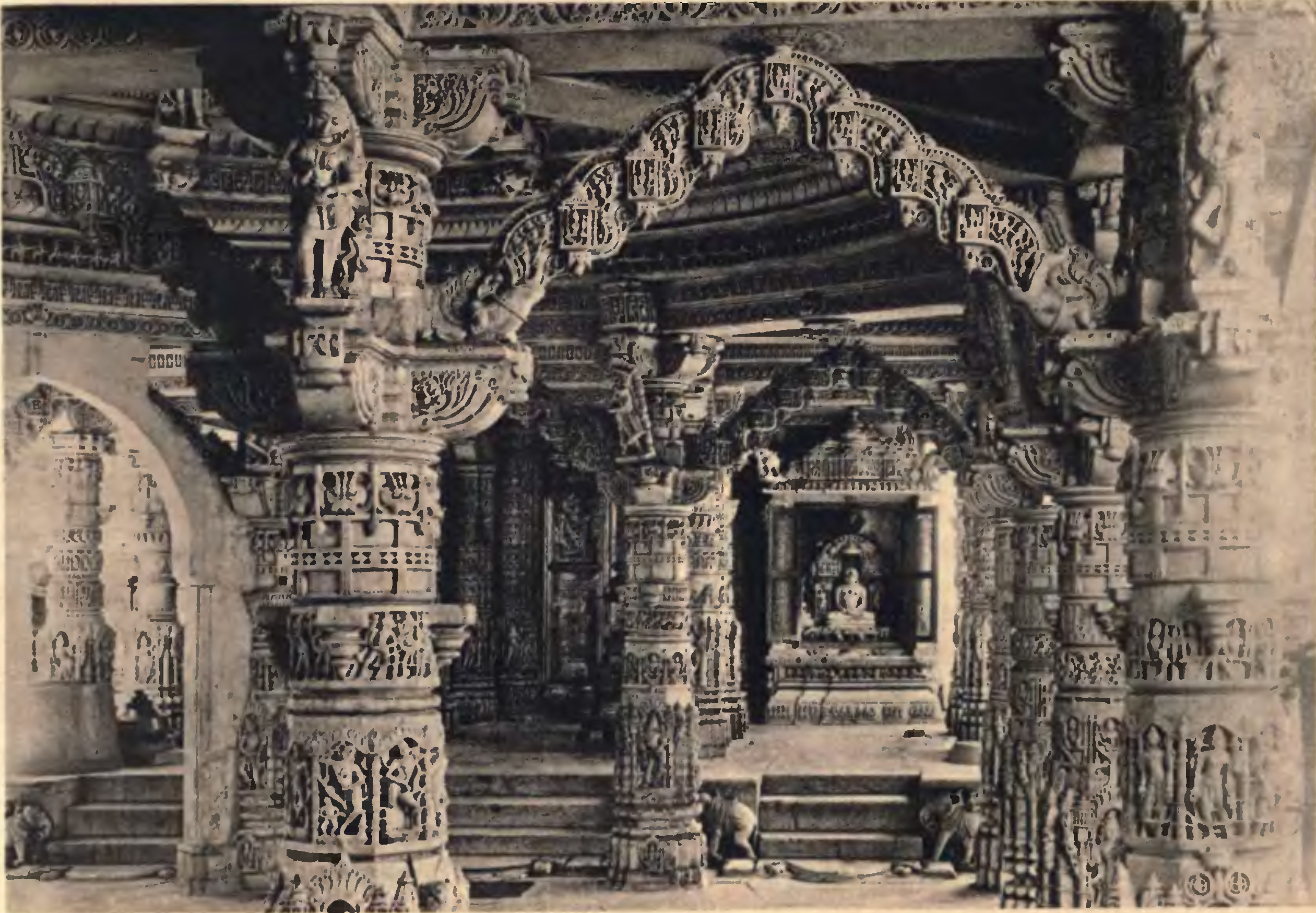
Nitin Chandrakant Desai was inspired from the Dilwara Temples (pictured) to build Chandramukhi's brothel.

Desai started building the sets in August 2000—two months before the shooting began—and finished in May 2001 in Film City, a film studio complex in Mumbai. For representing an aristocratic family, he was predominantly used the colors yellow and green for Devdas' no-walls in-between house to make it a 1911 British-styled home, and used between 128 and 180 pillars (this was inconsistently reported), each 60-foot (18 m) high. The building had a total area of 250-foot (76 m), and was constructed on a ₹1.5 million (US$30,864.64) budget.

For Paro's haveli, the place where she lives before marriage, Desai spent ₹30 million (US$617,292.84) and used pink and blue as the main colors. He told Anita Aikara of The Indian Express in a 2011 interview, "[...] I spend so much time in the details of the home that Bhansali asked me to rework Devdas' house. It looked very small when compared to Paro's [haveli]." According to India Today's journalists, 1.22 million pieces for Paro's bedroom's stained glass were continuously made in ten days; Alkokar claimed that it is aimed to "reflect her fragile beauty". A number of painted walls with standstill figures were created for Paro's mansion, features in the film post her marriage to Bhuvan, and, this time for the primary color, Desai chose "claustrophobic" red. Both Devdas' and Paro's house were done in November 2000.

The brothel of Chandramukhi was the most expensive set among others, with ₹120 million (US$2.47 million) was spent; The Times of India called it "the costliest set of made in the history of Hindi cinema", while Alkokar said that it was "the most challenging job". A multidimensional set with a temple city and an artificial lake around it, the construction was inspired by the Dilwara Temples located in Rajasthan. With the major color of festive gold, the set had 60 explicitly-carved domes and a 6-foot (1.8 m) chandelier. For the song "Dola Re Dola", Desai (without Alkokar's help) used twenty-five pieces of glass for the floor and added a layer to prevent actors from getting injured when they dance on it. The media estimated the total budget of the film's entire sets to be ₹200 million (US$4.12 million), and reported that it took nearly nine months to build them. Desai recalled the experiment as "a beautiful challenge, as a classic masterpiece had to be recreated with precision and opulence".

=== Characters ===
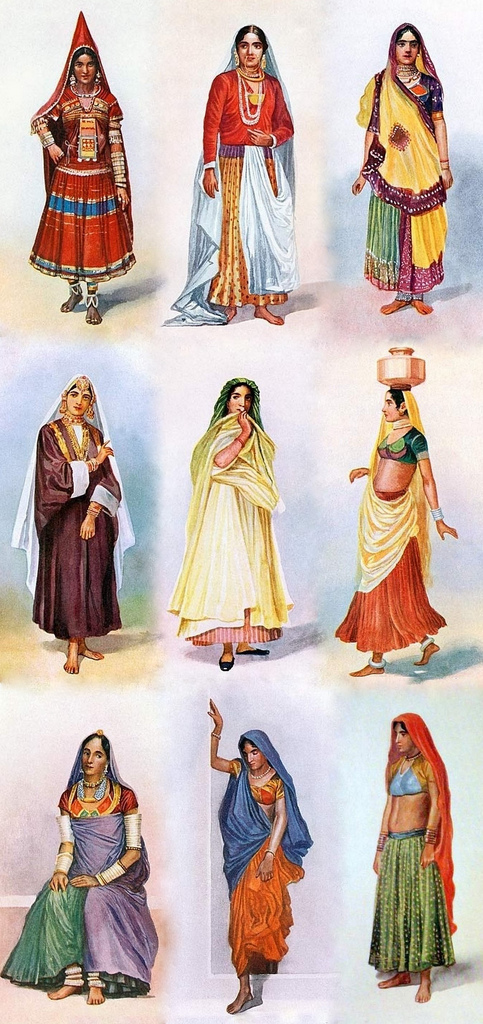
The painter M. V. Dhurandhar's illustrations of ghagra cholis, which were parts of Dixit's costumes

Abu Jani, Neeta Lulla, Reza Shariffi, and Sandeep Khosla designed the costumes. Lulla claimed to be a fan of the duo Jani and Khosla, adding that "I do not know them on a personal level, but I received positive vibes. We were competing among ourselves not with each other." In preparation, the crews watched a number of Bengali films based on Kolkata, talking to locals, and did research on the Bengali culture, including traditional wear and dress patterns at that time. They visited several museums, and made intensive discussions on the costumes that, according to The Times of India, "... would be a blend of [a look] from the magical period and a look that today's audience could relate to". All of the clothes by Jani and Khosla were inspired by traditional Bengali clothes from the 1930s and 1940s. Beside that, Lulla bought 600 saris from the city and mix-and-matched them: "Sometimes, I mixed two saris in one, sometimes three." Designing the jewellery as well, she chose kundan and garnet, which she found to be "suited the [film's] era", and added stones in them.

Khan had read the novel version several years before the shooting, however, confessing that he did not want to watch the two remakes, starring K. L. Saigal and Dilip Kumar as his character. He said, "I did not want my own interpretation to be influenced by what he had done." Devdas, a part that required Khan to drink, has two different appearances—the first was a western look, while the second was a typical alcoholic look. For the former, which features in the film following the character's study in London, Jani and Khosla bought vintage suits, including cravat, handkerchief, and shoes, from old-clothing stores in the same city. For the latter, they dressed him in beige, white, and off-white, although Khan wanted the character to wear black clothes. They also gave Khan an angvastra, chikan, dhoti, and kurta, and a short-hair cut to show his nonchalant nature.

Same as Khan, Rai decided to not watch the earlier remakes and wanted "to go in to this project with no mental frame of reference whatsoever, I wanted my Paro to be Sanjay's interpretation of the character and to do that, I needed to stay free of any conceptions based on what previous actresses had done with the role." Lulla gave the mix-and-match product of 600 saris—with traditional motifs of Kantha and traditional-striped borders, called chudipaard and aashpaard—to her for the film's first half; according to reports from the media, it was revealed that each saris took around three hours to drape on a mannequin. While for the second half, Rai wore dhakais with eight to nine meters long, which was different from the regular size of six meters. Furthermore, Lulla used tangails, ashpards, chudipards, and Chinese brocades. She used traditional print valkalams for Jaykar and Banarasi sari for Ananya Khare, playing Devdas' sister-in-law.

Dixit believed that Devdas and the two previous versions "are entirely different", and commended Bhansali's "mounting, eye for detail [and] passion" for "[helping] raise the movie to an absolutely [dissimilar] level altogether". Describing Chandramukhi as "a very poignant, very feminine character", she compared her part to Rekha's role in Muqaddar Ka Sikandar (1978). Dixit, who portrayed a courtesan for the first time, admitted that it was "a very challenging role, especially since Sanjay does not compromise with quality". She added, "Still she has much resilience. She belongs to a relegated category but she possesses a golden heart. Playing such a role was an excellent experience." She wore ghagra cholis, Banarasi saris, brocades, and silk saris that have a total weight of approximately thirty kilograms and costed ₹1.5 million (US$30,864.64), making its designers Jani and Khosla were initially reluctant to give her the costumes. Moreover, Dixit experienced difficulty when she wore the dress for publicity stills, leading the duo to create a new lighter version, weighted sixteen kilograms. The lengha was described as a 'marvel of mirrors which took a team of skilled artisans two months to put together and featured as part of 'The Fabric of India' exhibit held in 2015 at the Victoria & Albert Museum in London.

Meanwhile, Lulla worked on Rai's and Dixit's saris in the song "Dola Re Dola", along with Shariffi who helped to design the latter actress' costume. Jani and Khosla designed Shroff's costumes as well; an open-collared sherwani, dhoti, and kurta were employed. Interviewed by the journalist Aseem Hattangady of Rediff.com, they complained that "the biggest challenge was, we had to avoid having the ensembles look fresh and unworn. This was achieved by selective washing."

=== Filming ===
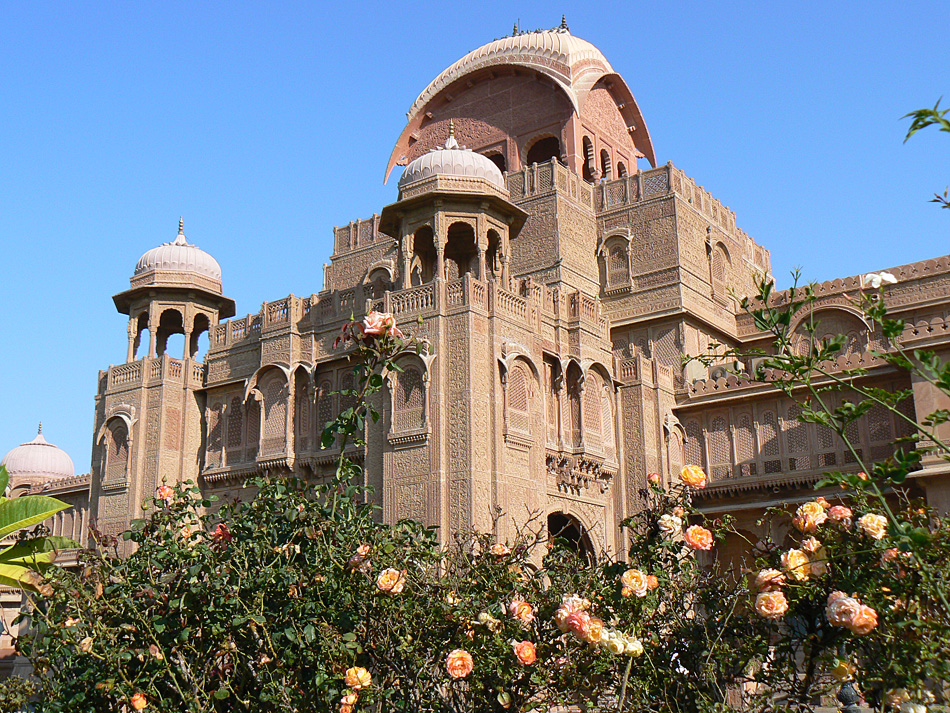
The train sequences from Devdas were shot in Bikaner.

Binod Pradhan served as the cinematographer for Devdas. He met Bhansali when the shooting of 1942: A Love Story and supposed to filmed Khamoshi: The Musical, but he was replaced by Anil Mehta for an unknown reason. Pradhan said, "It took time to adjust to Sanjay's style of work. I am known to be a slow cameraman. Initially, we would discuss camera angles and how he wanted a scene shot. But now, I can read his mind. I know exactly what he wants." He praised Bhansali for "handles love stories with a sensitivity that I have never seen on screen before". While working with Bhansali, Pradhan found the director to be "meticulous and painstaking" and it was revealed that the latter did research before the shooting began.

It took two days for Pradhan to work on the sets' lighting; he used three million watts of power produced by 42 generators and 2,500 lights with 700 lightmen were employed. Principal photography started in November 2000 in Film City. Birju Maharaj, Saroj Khan, Vaibhavi Merchant, and the duo Pappu–Malu (born Zahur Sheikh and Kavita Gandhi, respectively) completed the choreography. The artificial lake around the Chandramukhi's brothel set was filled by many gallons of water to avoid from dry up. The set was burnt three times, and the media presumed it because of the generators or diyas that were put around the location. On 9 December, the filming was delayed after two crew members had accidents on the set of Paro's haveli, with one dying (Dindayal Yadav, then aged 27) and the other (Raju Yadav) being seriously injured after trying to help the former. According to Bollywood Hungama, an electrician turned on a stand-fan while the two was near on it, causing Yadav's head was fatally hit.

A second delay happened in the 15-day shooting schedule on 8 January 2001, when the film's producer and financier Shah was arrested by the Mumbai Police; he was charged with receiving funding from the Karachi-based gangster Chhota Shakeel of the Mumbai underworld. The controversy began after a caller, claiming himself to be Abu Salem, contacted the news channel Star India and talked about his ₹480 million (US$9.88 million) investment on Devdas. However, Shah denied the accusation, admitting that he did not know the caller, and confessed the film's entire budget was financed by himself. The trial was commenced when the pre-release of his another film, Chori Chori Chupke Chupke (2001), and finished in October 2003 with the High Court sentenced him with a one-year imprisonment.

The film's climax sequences, featuring Devdas' travel to Paro's and her husband Bhuvan's house, were shot on a train in Bikaner. In their August 2001 issue, Filmfare published that 75% of the film was completed. Also that month, another accident occurred, resulting in the death of the 40-year-old lightman Subhash Morkar. The schedule for the song "Dola Re Dola" took place in Filmistan in November 2001. Shooting was completed on 29 April 2002. After the filming ended, it was edited by Bhansali's sister Bela Sehgal. Jitendra Chaudhary handled the audiography, while Monty Sharma did the background score.

== Music ==
The entire soundtrack and lyrics for Devdas was composed by Ismail Darbar, making it his second collaboration with Bhansali after Hum Dil De Chuke Sanam, and written by Nusrat Badr, respectively—except for "Kaahe Chhed", composed and written by Maharaj, and "Morey Piya", written by Sameer Anjaan. The vocals were performed by Dixit, Jaspinder Narula, Kavita Krishnamurthy, KK, Maharaj, Raghav Chatterjee, Rashmi Sharma, Shreya Ghoshal, Supriya Adhikari, Udit Narayan and Vinod Rathod.

The soundtrack album, which was highly anticipated, has nine original songs and one background score. Newspapers reported that it had been considered as "Bollywood's best music album ever" even before its release on 2 April 2002 by Universal Music India. The Vice President of Universal Music India Vinay Sapru refused to confirm the music rights' purchasing cost, but the press reported that the label had given an advance of more than ₹100 million (US$2.06 million). (Note: In an interview with Bharati Dubey of Rediff.com, the film's producer and financier Bharat Shah said that he earned ₹130 million (US$2.67 million). However, another article from the publication revealed that he only received ₹120 million (US$2.47 million), which was also reported by The Tribune.) Upon release, it topped charts on a number of platforms in India and emerged as the third-highest-selling Bollywood soundtrack of the year, with between 1.8 million and 2 million sales. According to Rediff.com, 5.000 units had been sold on the then-defunct e-commerce Fabmart itself. Chitralekha magazine featured the soundtrack in their listing of "Top Five Hindi Film Albums" of the year. The song "Maar Dala" became popular and entered the top 10 most-listened songs chart by Raaga.com, peaking the third position.

The album received positive critical reviews. Writing for India Today, S. Sahaya Ranjit singled out Ghoshal's "tuneful voice" and concluded, "In an age when film music is heavily westernised, the use of Indian instruments ... is pleasing. Apart from the voices, the rich choral accompaniment is prominent. A sheer delight for classical music buffs." Joginder Tuteja of Bollywood Hungama opined that Darbar's compositions and Badr's lyrics were "classical-based" and "very rich", respectively, while adding that the former did "a commendable job". Kavita Awasathi from the television entertainment network B4U shared similar thoughts of Darbar, with elaborating that "has once again weaved magic [and] done an admirable job here". Biswadeep Ghosh of Outlook observed that he "has shed all inhibitions and come up with some really divine music". A review in The Hindu said, "Ismail Durbar has made attempts to blend classical music into his tunes. But because of his dependence on and usage of familiar tunes, the music lacks the freshness."

== Marketing and release ==
Devdas was one of the most anticipated Indian films of the year, owing to its budget and the success of Bhansali's previous directorial venture, and several trade analysts regarded it as "a massive gamble". Taran Adarsh, the editor of the film magazine Trade Guide, noted, "There seems to be a lot of interest in the film which is positive indication." In his article, Adarsh wrote that Mega Bollywood received many calls from film exhibitors across the country, "wanting to open the advance booking for two weeks instead of the regular one-week advance booking". The journalist Prerana Trehan felt that the film had good word-of-mouth publicity, and Maya C. of The Hindu labelled it as the "most-talked-about Bollywood film of the year". With a total budget of ₹500 million (US$10.29 million), it was the most expensive Indian film at the time. The film's promotional trailer was televised in April 2002.

On 20 April 2002, Devdas was selected to premiere at the 2002 Cannes Film Festival, after the festival's director Christian June met Bhansali in November 2001. June wanted Bhansali to send the prints of the film to him in March 2002, but Bhansali did the requirement in the next month after shooting was done. Marking the first Indian film to be screened at the festival, it was chosen for the out-of-competition section and the premiere occurred on 23 May, with its stars—Khan and Rai—were in the attendance; the press questioned about the absence of Dixit. Audiences criticized the film's themes, which had been filmed several times before, and The Hindu called it the festival's "disappointment". Bhansali, however, later said of his enjoyment about the screening, describing it as "a huge honour for Bollywood" and claimed, "To me, it seems like an opportunity for a completely new kind of audience to see our cinema." Khan and Rai went to New York City on 29 June to attend a press conference for promoting the film, this time Bhansali did not attend it.

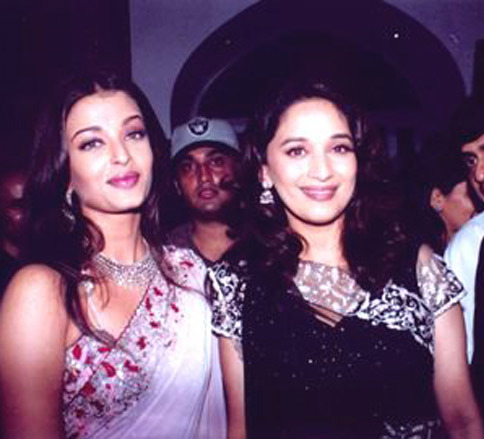
Rai and Dixit at the special screening for Devdas, one day before its worldwide release

On 11 July 2002, the Ministry of Information and Broadcasting held a special screening for Indian Deputy Prime Minister L. K. Advani in an auditorium at Mahadev Road, New Delhi. Another special screening was organized at the same time, attended by the film's cast and crew members and other celebrities. On the next day, Devdas was opened worldwide after facing several postponements; it was originally scheduled for release on 14 June, but later shifted to 28 June and 12 July. It faced competition from Kuch Tum Kaho Kuch Hum Kahein, Kyaa Dil Ne Kahaa, Om Jai Jagadish and Shararat. Devdas was released on 350 screens in India and 250 screens overseas. While the film's duration was 174 minutes in India, it was shortened to 150 minutes for the overseas prints. As parts of the promotions, MTV India managed special shows for the film: Devdas – Countdown Calendar features footage and tracks from the film, and MTV's Big Picture: Director's Special contains interviews of the cast and Bhansali. The former was aired on the channel from early July to the day of the film's release, while the latter was broadcast on 18 July.

Devdas along with five other remakes of the novel was shown at the Devdas Film Festival, a six-day festival held by the Hyderabad Film Club in Secunderabad on 16–22 September 2002; the 2002 version by Bhansali was chosen as the closing of the festival. The secretary S. S. Prakash Reddy told The Hindu that the purpose of the festival was to show "people ... the subtle changes in script and the deviations from the original novel too." Devdas was selected for the Festival of Indian Feature Films and Documentaries section at the India Festival 2002 at Tagore Theatre on 21–30 September. It was screened at the Directorate of Film Festivals's 33rd International Film Festival of India on 1 October. It opened the Palm Springs International Film Festival on 12 January 2003. The film was shown at Bollywood Shuffle festival in Brooklyn on 20 December. In 2017, Fathom Events screened the film alongside the period epic romantic drama Veer-Zaara (2004) as parts of the "Best of Bollywood Event Series" event in the United States.

The novel's version by Chattopadhyay was translated to English under the title of Devdas: A Novel by Sreejata Guha in Bangalore, featuring Rai in a scene from Devdas on the cover. It was published by Penguin Books in July 2002 (shortly after the release of the film), and ranked among the highest-selling books in India. Distributed by Eros International, the film was released on a double-disc DVD on 20 January 2003 in NTSC widescreen format. The film's cable and satellite rights for Indian television were sold to Sony Entertainment Television in a five-year contract for ₹120 million (US$2.47 million) on 18 April, and its world television premiere happened on 27 April on Sony Max. Its VHS and single-disc DVD versions were released on 26 January 2004 and 10 February 2009, respectively. The film was re-released in the English-dubbed version in July 2004 at the theatres and multiplexes across India. The film was available on a triple-disc DVD on 1 February 2005. A VCD version was also provided. The rights of the film subsequently acquired by Khan under his production and distribution company Red Chillies Entertainment. It has been accessible for streaming on Apple TV+ and Amazon Prime Video since March 2016.

== Reception ==
=== Critical response ===
==== India ====
Devdas received mixed reviews from Indian critics, with most of them praised Dixit in her role as Chandramukhi, but panned Bhansali's direction, and Khan and Rai's performances.

Sukanya Verma described it as "a work of art and heart", saying, "Sanjay Leela Bhansali's labour of love Devdas is a larger-than-life, poignant and spectacular interpretation." However, she felt that the supporting cast "comes up with an exceedingly over-the-top performance and disrupts the entire tempo of the film", mostly that from Kher, who she found "goes overboard with her boisterous, dreamy-eyed mother". In a one-star review, the entertainment portal Bollywood Hungama stated, "... Devdas belies the expectations that one has from a film of this magnitude. Expectedly, the much-hyped film has taken a historic start all over, but it lacks in merits and most importantly, repeat value, which is so very vital to recover the colossal investment that has gone into its making." The critic explained that the film's "first half has an enjoyable mix of light moments and dramatic scenes", raising "the expectations of a better and much bigger second half. But the post-interval portions fail to hold ... attention and there are several reasons for it."

"Shah Rukh Khan does a good job in a very difficult role. ... His flashes of arrogant harshness are excellent, and he can carry off sensuous romantic scenes effortlessly. Madhuri Dixit ... does an equally good job. As for Aishwarya Rai, Bhansali has done a masterful job of camouflaging her weaknesses as an actress in practically every scene, and of photographing her to near perfection."

— Shyamala B. Cowsik of Rediff.com, reviewing the actor's performances in Devdas

The film critic Subhash K. Jha, who gave the film a three-and-a-half stars rating, asserted that Devdas "confirms the director's faith in the power of the visual medium to create poetry out of melodrama and the audience's faith in Bhansali as one of the most gifted filmmakers mainstream Hindi cinema has produced", adding that Rai "attains legendary proportions in this film ... Her eyes are crystal-blue pools that change colours according to her character's moods." Sita Menon appreciated Dixit's performance as Chandramukhi, a part that she called the "most understated role and perhaps the one that is most lingering", for being "stunning lending passion, fire and gentleness with such consummate ease that watching her perform is sheer delight". S. Ramachandran of Mid-Day complimented Khan for "excellently hics his way through without a hiccup in the role of Devdas", and believed that Rai "pumps glamour into the much sought-after role of Paro". Writing for The New Sunday Express, Baradwaj Rangan wrote that the film was dominated with the "most-elaborate" costumes and spoke positively of how Dixit "effortlessly combines allure and sacrifice".

Outlook claimed that "[s]eeing Devdas is like witnessing an exhausting opera. It's all about the sheer self-indulgence, ego and audacity of its maker". The magazine saw that Bhansali turned the film into "a tale of female bonding, between a head-strong Paro ... and Chandramukhi", and observed of how its dialogues "are declamatory with mixed metaphors and play of words aplenty", comparing it to Mughal-e-Azam (1960) and Pakeezah. Madhu Trehan (reviewing for the magazine as well) thought that Devdas became "a chick film" because of its dialogues and screenplay. Anjana Guha Chatterjee of The Indian Express concluded, "His film is in no way Sarat Chandra's Devdas. It was entirely Sanjay Leela Bhansali's Devdas." Khalid Mohamed rated the film three stars, dismissing it as "a magnum opus" that "makes [the audience] want to hit the bottle and fast out of sheer disappointment". Even so, he noted that Mukerji was "bankably competent" and described Rai's performance as the "best" one in her career. Rajeev Masand found the film to be "a big disappointment" and declared it as "the worst film" in Bhansali's directorial career, with Roshmila Bhattacharya reviewing, "Ornate, opulent and indulgent, Sanjay Leela Bhansali's Devdas is a rich tapestry of colours."

Ziya Us Salam took note of Bhansali's ability to "give form to feeling here, expression to thought. His concept is old and familiar, his presentation new and delightful. His canvas is grand, his imagination grander still. His sets are opulent, his images larger than life, his characters larger still." Deepa Gahlot opined that both Rai and Dixit were burdened by their heavy costumes and compulsion to perform perfectly. Gahlot bemoaned that the film's dialogues were "shockingly inappropriate—cheap in places", and added that "[the] film veers completely away from the novel in the second half, when he introduces Paro's creepy step-son-in-law, makes Devdas's vampish sister-in-law vie for control, and creates a forced situation for a meeting between the Paro and Chandramukhi who do a dance number together—unthinkable at the time." Komal Nahta, giving it eight out of ten stars, was impressed with Khan's "mind-blowing" performance, commending him for playing his role "with such finesse and aplomb that it is sheer delight to watch him." Amit Khanna from India Today credited Rai for "brings a fine balance of arrogance, vulnerability and sensuality to her performance".

Siddharth Patankar from NDTV opined that most of the film's cast "overacted" in the first half, and presumed it because of Bhansali's direction. He singled out Dixit's "powerful" performance, which he thought was a "highlight" of the film. In a review published in The Hindu, the critic Paresh C. Palicha elaborated: "On the acting front, the performance of the three main actors is top-notch." He lauded Khan for "[excelling] in the role of his lifetime", noting that "he shows a tendency to go overboard in the scenes where he is shown in an inebriated state ..." Ratna Rajaiah (also from The Hindu) hailed the film was an "outstanding example of brilliant cinematic techniques and technology", and according to her, Devdas was "a fabulous, sumptuous, glittering tribute to the lofty ideal of romantic love where almost every frame leaves you gasping at its immaculately, painstaking orchestrated beauty." Sudhanva Deshpande of Frontline magazine referred to Khan as "overwhelming", while arguing that Rai gave a "below-par" performance though she "gets all of the director's attention and the best shots". Furthermore, Deshpande believed Dixit had succeeded to save her "weak" role.

==== Overseas ====
Devdas generated mixed reviews when it premiered at Cannes, with many reviewers were critical of the direction, story, sets, and costumes. Journalists also attributed it to the film's melodramatic sequences and how Khan and Rai portraying their roles as Devdas and Paro, respectively. However, better reviews were given following its theatrical release. On the review aggregator website Rotten Tomatoes, 89% of 19 critics' reviews are positive, with an average rating of 7.6/10. Patrick Z. McGavin of the Chicago Tribune said that it "welds a powerful technical sophistication with a deeply emotional story that moves starkly from joyous exuberance to epic tragedy", and felt Bhansali had brilliantly directed the film, "[layering] abstract stylization with a charged dramatic construction". Writing for the BBC, Shamaila Khan gave the film nine-and-a-half stars and declared it as "one of the best films" she has ever seen, noting that it was "completely justifies [its] title as the most expensive Indian film ever made". She expressed approval of the "breathtaking" cinematography of the film, and commended its sets and costume designs.

Zeba Haider from the Arab News found Devdas to be overly "loud and melodramatic", while hailing the production aspects and the performances of the lead cast. However, Haider lauded Bhansali for "bringing the life culture and values of 1930s to a 21st-century audience" and concluded, "There is no denying that he did succeed in making the audience alive to the realities of the 1930s. No doubt the film viewer will find himself somewhere in some form in Bhansali's Devdas. And that is a great achievement." In the words of Empire magazine: "Devdas lacks Bollywood's broader comic touches but in its field, it's the event movie of the year." According to the review, Rai "proves she has the acting talent to back up her flawless looks". Giving the film two stars, the critic and film historian Derek Malcolm of The Guardian criticized its production design, which he described as "tacky". The Chicago Reader weekly's J. R. Jonas added, "... the sets and costumes are intoxicating, and whenever the tabla kicked in, I understood why people of my parents' generation used to dream about the movies."

In Screen International, Sheila Johnston wrote that Khan was a "dead loss as the film's romantic hero" and thought her chemistry with Rai "a failure". Johnston deemed that Khan looks "too old for the role", but saying that Rai "develops nicely from gorgeous doe-eyed ingenue to a figure of real stature and authority". Laura Bushell of the BBC rated the film four out of five stars, taking note of the actors, especially Rai, who the critic called "stunningly beautiful". Derek Elley of Variety summarized, "By contrast, Bhansali's reworking, in splashy color and widescreen, cranks up the fantasy elements, piles on the melodrama and shears back most of the novel's plot." Reviewing for the Radio Times, David Parkinson, giving the rating of three stars, reported Dixit had made an "exhilarating presence" in Devdas and commented that the film was "gorgeous" and "epic". Kim Linekin from Eye Weekly was appreciative of Rai's performance: "Surprisingly, the beauty pageant winner is the best actor in the bunch. Rai's doe eyes and long hair are exploited to full effect, but she also seems the most committed to the story and creates the most believable character."

Sukhdev Sandhu of The Daily Telegraph gave Devdas a scathing review by saying that it was "embarrassingly bad" and "absolutely horrid". He observed that Rai "dimply and doe-eyed, coos and trills like an asthmatic mynah bird" and saw that she failed to made a chemistry with Khan, later arguing that the film "wastes the talent of its cast". He opined, "It gives its audience a tacky, cartoon version of Bollywood. Colourful and tumultuous it my be, but its preoccupation with spectacle does not make up for the absence of soul." The Independent likened the film to a "pudding trolley" that has "flaring colours, elaborate song and dance sequences and opulent locations". Michael Dequina of the Film Threat rated the film five stars, stating "... there's more to Devdas than extravagance; the emotion and passion of the story is felt just as strongly in every frame as the budget". Rich Cline, writing for the website as well, noted in his review that the costumes were "vibrant" and regarded that its plot was "jammed with meaning and relevance".

Kryztoff de Breza did a review for Rediff.com at the film's premiere at Cannes; he described the film as "a treat to the eyes" and admired its sets and costumes, which he found to be "beautiful". In a review carried by The Globe and Mail, Liam Lacey shared similar thoughts: "It's all vastly sumptuous, though the spectacle frequently overwhelms the dramatic impact." Still, Breza was ambivalent of Bhansali's direction, mentioning that he "lose the strings and the film degenerates rapidly" when it features the sequences of Devdas and Chunnilal getting drunk. Rick McGinnis considered the cast's performances were "completely over-the-top—pitched at a level somewhere north of soap-opera hysterical—and absolutely perfect", while labelling the film "an instant Bollywood classic". Katrina Onstad of the National Post credited the film for giving its "... older generation of duelling mothers [characters] ... some great, scenery-chewing monologues". The BBC's Poonam Joshi presumed the story was "beautifully recounted through subtle and heartrending interchange". Adrian Martin recognized the film as "one of the most spectacular Bollywood musicals of the past decade".

=== Box office ===
Although the reviews were generally mixed, Devdas was highly successful at the box office in India and overseas, due to its cast's performances, costumes, dialogues, narrative style, and sound design. In India, the film had a theatrical run of fourteen weeks. It collected ₹20.9 million (US$430,047.35) on the opening day, the year's highest first-day earnings, and ₹61.5 million (US$1.27 million) after the first weekend. Following the first week, the film had grossed ₹117.8 million (US$2.42 million)—according to The Times of India, it earned ₹3.5 million (US$72,017.5) at six theatres in Hyderabad in this period. Still, Devdas gradually lost public interest and subsequently earned ₹0.9 million (US$18,518.79) in the next week. The trade analyst Amod Mehra reported, "Hype has pulled the film through. Though the film is doing well in major cities, collections have dropped drastically in the interiors." He believed that the big budget of the film was negatively influenced its theatrical performance. It eventually collected ₹681.9 million (US$14.03 million), making it Indian highest-grossing film of 2002.

In the United Kingdom, Devdas emerged as the highest-grossing film of the year from India and The Guardian called it "a significant UK box office hit"; the film debuted in fifth place, grossing $730.243. By the end of its first week, the film had grossed ₹97.5 million (US$2.01 million) abroad, marking the year's highest overseas first-week gross for an Indian film. At the end of its overseas running, the Hindi language collected ₹316.9 million (US$6.52 million), including $2.5 million from the United Kingdom. The film-trade website Box Office India estimated the Hindi version's total collections to be ₹998.8 million, making it the most profitable Indian film of 2002. A Chinese language version grossed a further CN¥2.75 million in China. As of 2003, the film grossed a total of approximately ₹1.68 billion ($35 million) worldwide.

== Accolades ==
Devdas was the Indian submission for the Best International Feature Film at the 75th Academy Awards. It was chosen by the Film Federation of India (FFI) over the fantasy film Agni Varsha (2002), the dramas Kabhi Khushi Kabhie Gham (2001), Mondo Meyer Upakhyan (2002) and Saanjhbatir Roopkathara (2002), the war film Kannathil Muthamittal (2002) and the biopic The Legend of Bhagat Singh (2002). Bhansali met the director Ashutosh Gowariker and the actor Aamir Khan—the crew and cast members of Lagaan (2001), which was also nominated in the category at the previous ceremony—to ask for their help to get Devdas to enter the nomination. When the 75th Academy Awards was held on 23 March 2003 at the Dolby Theatre in Hollywood, Los Angeles, the film was not nominated and the FFI was blamed by journalists, including Gautaman Bhaskaran of The Hindu, who called their decision "shortsighted", "almost mulish" and "has been extremely detrimental for Indian cinema".

Devdas received a nomination for the Best Film Not in the English Language from the 56th iteration of the British Academy Film Awards (BAFTA). At the 50th National Film Awards, the film received five awards: Best Popular Film Providing Wholesome Entertainment, Best Playback Singer – Female (Ghoshal), Best Production Design (Desai), Best Costume Design (Lulla, Jani, Khosla, Shariffi) and Best Choreography (Saroj Khan). It garnered a leading 17 nominations at the 48th Filmfare Awards, and won 11 awards—the most for any film at the time—including Best Film, Best Director (Bhansali), Best Actor (Khan), Best Actress (Rai) and Best Supporting Actress (Dixit). It won 16 of its 18 nominations at the 4th IIFA Awards, including Best Film, Best Director (Bhansali), Best Actor (Khan), Best Actress (Rai) and Best Supporting Actress (Kher).

== Legacy ==
=== Impact ===
"How can love ever grow irrelevant? Devdas is the ultimate love story. The novel belonged to an era when drinking, going to nautch girls and loving your neighbours daughter were taboo. All that is irrelevant today. But [Devdas'] unflinching love for Paro, whereby even the seductive Chandramukhi couldn't distract him, is timeless. Devdas gave dignity to the concept of love. I've never heard of such love anywhere else."

— Bhansali on the relevance of Devdas

Devdas is regarded as one of Bhansali's best works. Rahul Desai of Film Companion wrote in 2017, "There is no greater film to demonstrate how the glorious vanity of song picturization in Indian movies goes a long way in defining our memories of them. Devdas, I suspect, was the beginning of Bhansali's marriage with perfection and prose—an abusive, fascinating relationship that would thrive on its imperfections in the years to come." In an interview with The Indian Express, Bhansali revealed that he would only cast Khan again if he remade the film. He called Khan's acting flawless and said that the actor "understood the character without losing his spontaneity", adding, "He has left me speechless. I had my doubts before working with him. But it's his most endearing and honest performance."

Devdas has been featured in several listings. Richard Corliss of Time magazine featured the film in his listings of "2002: Best and Worst" in 2002 and "The 10 Greatest Movies of the Millennium" in 2012. In 2010, Empire listed the film among the "100 best films of world cinema", noting: "A star-crossed love-triangle melodrama... Hollywood needs another one of those!" Also that year, Donald Clarke, writing for The Irish Times, considered it to be one of "Indian most exuberant films". In 2013, The New York Times' Jeff Olozia included it in the "Louboutin's Bollywood" listing. The film was ranked sixth in Lata Jha of Mint's listing of "Ten Most Popular Period Films of Bollywood" in 2015. The next year, Elena Nicolaou and Prakruti Patel from O, The Oprah Magazine featured Devdas in their listing of "25 Best Bollywood Movies of All Time".

A book on the production of the film was published by the journalist and author Mushtaq Shiekh in August 2002, entitled Devdas: The Indian Hamlet. Shah Rukh Khan and Bhansali wrote the foreword and afterword, respectively.

=== Influence ===
Dale Hudson of the film journal Screen credited Devdas for "dramatically [changing] the social mobility of women from earlier cinematic interpretations" of the novel. The Hindu hailed, "The film is even greater than Romeo and Juliet, as it has been shot more number of times than the Shakespearean play, itself." A dialogue said by Khan, "Babuji ne kahaa gaon chhod do, sab ne kahaa Paro ko chhod do..." (Dad said to leave the village, everyone said to leave Paro...), and, "Kaun kambhakkht bardaasht karne ko peeta hai?" (Who the hell drink to tolerate?), told by Khan to Dixit, attained popularity. Deepika Padukone, who collaborated with Bhansali in Goliyon Ki Raasleela Ram-Leela (2013), Bajirao Mastani (2015) and Padmaavat (2018), revealed that she was impressed with how Bhansali portraying the female characters, noting: "If you look closely, every (female) character has her own life and journey; I hope my part is also as remembered and loved as that of ... Paro or Chandramukhi's."

Following the film's success, traditional Indian women's costumes emerged as a style trend of the year. The Hindu wrote that it has influenced young women in India to wear saris that have the same design with those of Rai and Dixit in Devdas. Most properties from the film, including pieces of glass from the scene in which Shah Rukh Khan's character breaking his alcohol bottle after getting drunk, were offered for purchase on several Indian auction websites. In March 2003, Rai's saris were exhibited at the Taj Mahal Palace Hotel. Talking to The Hindu, Lulla said that the "bridal collection epitomises the traditional Indian woman who believes in tasteful things of life complete with class and elegance"; she added that Rai's jewellery was popular among Indian college students. They were re-exhibited in August at the Welcomhotel Chennai. The works have been referenced in several visual arts; Suhasi Dhami's look in a 2012 episode from Yahan Main Ghar Ghar Kheli was inspired by the saris. Also that year, Filmfare included Rai's costumes in their listing of "10 Shades of Beauty", elaborating, "From her jewellery to her pallu, all her styling was given intricate details which made this Paro look flawless."

== In popular culture ==
The song "Dola Re Dola" was reused in Karan Johar's Rocky Aur Rani Kii Prem Kahaani (2023) as a dance sequence performed by Ranveer Singh and Tota Roy Chowdhury.

== See also ==
- Devdas, 1936 film
- Devdas, 1955 film
- Devdas, 2013 Bangladeshi remake
- Raaz, 2002 film
- List of Indian submissions for the Academy Award for Best International Feature Film
- List of submissions to the 75th Academy Awards for Best Foreign Language Film
