= Kuberan (2002 film) =

- Directed by: Sundar Das
- Written by: V. C. Ashok
- Produced by: Menaka
- Starring: Dileep; Samyuktha Varma; Kalabhavan Mani
- Cinematography: Saloo George
- Edited by: L. Bhoominathan
- Music by: Mohan Sithara; Sharreth (Score)
- Production company: Revathy Kalamandhir
- Distributed by: Shenoy Cinemas; Sudev Release
- Release date: 5 April 2002
- Country: India
- Language: Malayalam

Kuberan is a 2002 Indian Malayalam-language comedy drama film directed by Sundar Das and produced by Menaka under the production company Revathy Kalamandhir. It stars Dileep, Samyuktha Varma, and Kalabhavan Mani, along with a supporting cast of Uma Shankari, Harisree Ashokan, Keerthy Suresh, Indrans, and Jagathy Sreekumar. The film was released during Vishu 2002.

== Plot ==
Siddharthan, an exhibitionist, is the guardian of three children from his village. He rents a house posing as a rich man and is visited by his old friend, Ramanujan, who creates chaos. The young heiress, Pooja, is the daughter of the owner of a palace and has a haunted past. Her husband was a sadist, and she ran away to her native village. Her mother finds out where she is and also comes to the village. Pooja does not want to go with her mother. Hence, she acts like an amnesia patient and says that their neighbour, Siddharthan, is her husband and his adopted children are their children. Thus, her mother allows Pooja to stay in the village. Pooja's husband finds her and comes to get her back. Pooja tells Siddharthan that she does not want to go with her husband. Siddharthan fights Pooja's husband, and in the end, Gouri's father shoots Pooja's husband and goes to prison. Pooja leaves the house, and Siddharthan joins his girlfriend, Gauri.

== Cast ==
- Dileep as Siddharthan
- Samyuktha Varma as Pooja
- Kalabhavan Mani as Ramanujan, Siddharthan's Friend
- Uma Shankari as Gauri, Siddharthan's Lover
- Jagathy Sreekumar as S.I. Thimmayya
- Harisree Ashokan as Theyyunni
- Indrans as "Arana" Abdu
- Janardhanan as Dr. Vasan
- Suresh Krishna as Sanjay, Pooja's Husband
- Mohan Sharma as Goppannan, Gouri's Father
- Baburaj as Giri
- Rizabawa as Thampuran, Pooja's Father
- Manka Mahesh as Pooja's Mother
- Bindu Ramakrishnan as Pooja's Grandmother
- Master Vignesh as Siddharth's adopted child
- Keerthy Suresh as Siddharth's adopted child
- Geetha Salam

== Soundtrack ==
The film's soundtrack contains six songs, all composed by music director Mohan Sithara, Background score by Sharreth, and with lyrics written by Gireesh Puthenchery.

No.	Title	Singer(s)
1	"Kanakachilanka"	M. G. Sreekumar, Sujatha Mohan
2	"Kanakachilanka" (M)	M. G. Sreekumar
3	"Kannivasantham"	K. J. Yesudas
4	"Kannivasantham" (D)	K. J. Yesudas, Sujatha Mohan
5	"Manimukile"	Swarnalatha
6	"Oru Mazhappakshi Paadunnu"	M. G. Sreekumar, Sujatha Mohan, Mohan Sithara

== Reception ==
A critic from Sify wrote that "Kuberan is old wine in a new bottle". A critic from Screen India praised the performances of the cast, the music and the scriptwriting.

== Box office ==
The film was a commercial success.

== Accolades ==
Kerala Film Critics Association Awards

- Best Make-up Artist – Jayachandran
- Best Costume Design - Indrans Jayan
