= Subarna Ray Chaudhuri =

Indian Costume Designer

Subarna Ray Chowdhuri
- Born: January 12, 1972 (age 54)
- Occupation: Costume designer
- Notable work: Parineeta (2005)
- Awards: IIFA Award for Best Costume Design

Subarna Ray Chowdhuri is a noted Indian costume designer from Kolkata. She won the Apsara Critic Choice Award for her work in Parineeta and also won the IIFA Award for Best Costume Design in 2006.

In 2013, Subarna designed for three movies :, Gunday and Ghanchakkar, each of which was distinctly different from the other. Actress Sonakshi Sinha vociferously expressed her concern over the absence of Subarna's nomination from most awards for their film 'Looterey'.
