= Neeta Lulla =

Indian costumer designer and fashion stylist (born 1965)

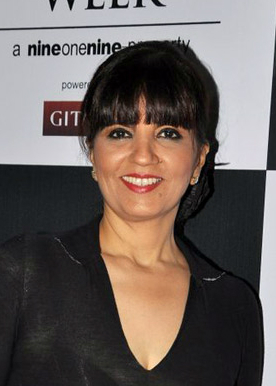
- Lulla in 2012
- Born: 5 March 1965 (age 61); Mumbai, Maharashtra, India
- Occupations: Costume designer; couturier; fashion stylist
- Label: Neeta Lulla Fashions
- Spouse: Shyam Lulla
- Children: 2
- Awards: National Film Awards for Best Costume Design
- Website: www.neetalulla.com

Neeta Lulla is an Indian costume designer and fashion stylist who has worked on over 300 films. She has been designing wedding dresses since 1985. She is famed for designing costumes in Jagadeka Veerudu Athiloka Sundari, Khuda Gawah, and Devdas.

== Career ==
Her first big client was jewelry designer Varuna Jani, though Jani hadn't started her business at the time. After that Lulla fully committed to a Bollywood client base when she designed for actor Sapna who was prominent in the Bollywood community in South India. This success was followed by her designs for actresses Salma Agha and Sridevi.

A notable creation from later in Neeta's career was a dress she designed for Aishwarya Rai's wedding to Abhishek Bachchan. She crafted Rai's pearl-encrusted lehenga for her mehendi ceremony and an additional dress for her South Indian wedding ceremony. The designer has claimed her favorite actress for whom she has created pieces was Divya Bharti. Neeta Lulla has designed for Shilpa Shetty, Aishwarya Rai, Sridevi, Sapna, Salma Azad, Isha Koppikar and Juhi Chawla. Courtesy of reality TV show Tahul, Lulla also designer for Dimpy Ganguly, Rahul Mahajan's young bride.

After successfully completing the challenge of designing for films like Mohenjo Daro (2016), she plans on trying her hand in Tollywood again with Gautamiputra Satakarni.

Neeta Lulla has been known to utilize Paithani, the ancient technique of tapestry that combines multiple threads of different colors and incorporates gold and silver threads woven together to create a dynamic piece of silk. One of her most notable Paithani collections was shown in February 2016 at the Make In India initiative. At this show she showcased a wide range of pieces including flowing lehangas, long kurtas, jackets, dhoti pants, sarong skirts — all of which were embroidered according to the Paithani style. In regards to the collection and show held in Maharashtra, Neeta commented:

"Maharashtra has always held a special place in my heart; this has been home to my whole life and art. I have chosen to showcase the intricacies, elaborateness and immaculacy of Paithani, a legacy of Maharashtra."

In 2013, Lulla opened The Whistling Wood International Neeta School of Fashion in her home city of Mumbai. The institute offers a selection of courses in fashion, merchandising and online marketing. The school is currently owned by Subash Ghai who has worked with Lulla on several films. Neeta comments:

"I have been teaching fashion for the last 26 years. As an extension to my teaching I joined a venture which is part of Whistling Woods International that belongs to Ghai. It seems that Indian film industry really does see the fashion industry as an extension of their own business."

== Social activism ==
Neeta Lulla has been vocal about combating gender-based violence and has used her work as a platform for promoting the issue. Her 2016 collection "#SheIsMe" simultaneously communicated both gentleness and resilience in the face of abuse. The collections debut at Lakme Fashion Week included a dance recital that spoke against women abuse. Lulla comments:

"This collection in its entirety speaks about a woman's characteristics. You see the vibrancy of the Cherry Blossom and the Osmanthus transition into the colours of dried flowers and cracked mother Earth. Just as these magnificent miracles of nature respond to tenderness and care but can also just as easily dry away with neglect, a woman's spirit begins to wither under any physical or emotional abuse. We need to raise our voice against this."

== Personal life ==
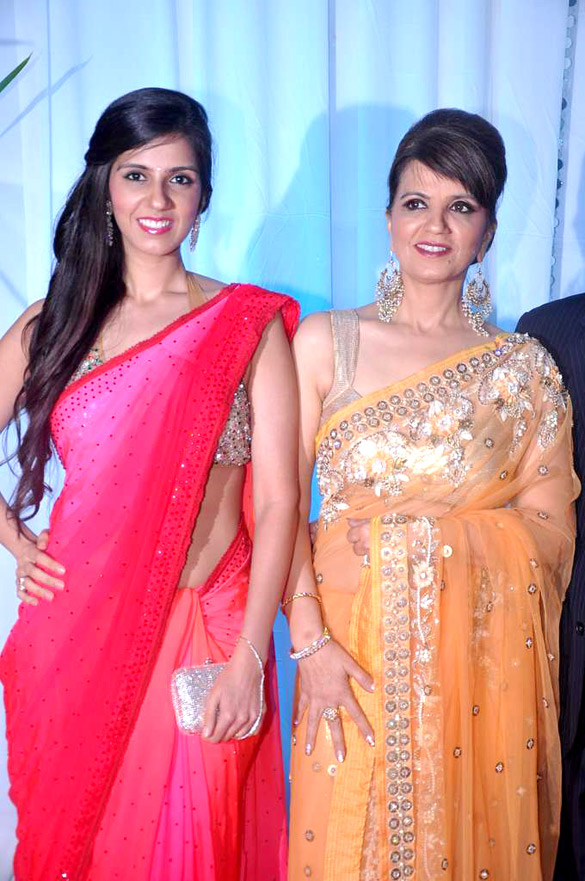
Neeta Lulla at Esha Deol's wedding reception

Neeta Lulla was born in Mumbai, India in a Sindhi family and grew up in Mumbai and Hyderabad. She spent significant time in Film City, Mumbai, a film studio and completed her education from SNDT Women's University. She is now married to Dr Shyam Lulla who is a psychiatrist.

== Collections ==
- Make in India: showcased an exclusive Paithani collection made of contemporary separates on 17 February 2016
- #SheIsMe: showcased at Lakme Fashion Week, collection focused on combating gender based violence, 6 April 2016

== Awards ==
- National Film Award for Best Costume Design 2012 for Balgandharva
- National Film Award for Best Costume Design 2009 for Jodhaa Akbar.
- IIFA Best Costume Design Award 2009 for Jodhaa Akbar.
- Kingfisher Fashion Award 2005 for Contribution to Fashion
- Bollywood Movie Award – Best Costume Designer 2003 for Devdas.
- Zee Cine Award for Best Costume Designer 2003 for Devdas.
- National Film Award for Best Costume Design 2002 for Devdas.
- Bollywood Movie Award – Best Costume Designer 2001 for Mission Kashmir.
- IIFA Best Costume Design Award 2000 for Taal
- Fashion Designer of the Decade at Satya Brahma founded Indian Affairs India Leadership Conclave 2016.
- Cannes Film Festival 2023 – Best Costume Award for Shaakuntalam.
