= Curfewed Night =

Memoir by Basharat Peer

Curfewed Night: A Frontline Memoir of Life, Love and War in Kashmir
- Author: Basharat Peer
- Language: English
- Subject: Kashmir conflict
- Genre: Memoir
- Set in: 1990s, Jammu and Kashmir
- Publisher: Random House
- Publication date: 2010
- Publication place: India
- Pages: 256
- Awards: Crossword Prize for Nonfiction
- ISBN: 978-1439109113

Curfewed Night: A Frontline Memoir of Life, Love and War in Kashmir is a memoir on the Kashmir conflict between India and Pakistan, written by Kashmiri-American journalist Basharat Peer. It primarily focuses on the impact of the ongoing anti-India insurgency in Jammu and Kashmir, and is a winner of the Crossword Prize for Nonfiction. It was also included in the 2010 issues of both the 'Books of the Year' list by The Economist and 'A Year's Reading' by The New Yorker.

J&K authorities have removed Curfewed Night from the curriculum of Cluster University and University of Kashmir. Education advisors in Delhi/Srinagar have maintained that such “Resistance Literature” sustains “secessionist mindset, aspiration & narrative” among students.

== Synopsis ==
The book describes the author's personal experiences in the wake of the insurgency in Indian-administered Jammu and Kashmir in the 1990s. Despite his family's pleas, Jammu Kashmir Liberation Front militants attack an Indian military convoy close to their village. The Indian forces' reprisal is expected to be swift, and the family quickly grab their possessions and leave. In the end, they return home to find only a few bullets stuck in the walls, which Peer's grandfather pulls out with pliers.

A few years later, Peer's father is targeted in an attack by Kashmiri militants due to the fact that he is an officer in the Jammu and Kashmir Administrative Service, under a government seen to be run by Delhi. He was, according to rumour, betrayed by a jealous rival at work.

After becoming a journalist for an Indian newspaper, Peer reports on other wars far away from home but is inevitably drawn back to Kashmir.

The second half of his book records his interviews with the victims of the army occupation. Another sinister development is the increasing prominence in the conflict of Pakistani-funded militant groups such as Lashkar-e-Taiba and Jaish-e-Mohammed, which carry out suicide attacks in Kashmir, India and even in Pakistan itself against Sufi and Shia mosques. These groups also often have links with the Taliban.

The book ends in April 2005, with the hopeful resumption of a bus route between Srinagar and Muzaffarabad, the capitals of the Indian- and Pakistani-administered regions of Kashmir. But five years on, despite occasional gestures from both the governments, freedom is still a distant prospect for the people of Kashmir.

== Reviews ==
The book was well received. The New York Times described it as "an instructive primer on the conflict mixed with literary reportage on its human toll". and praised in the Guardian by Kamila Shamsie for the way it brought the conflict "into the lives of Kashmiris". The noted historian William Dalrymple, writing in The Guardian said an extraordinary book, a minor masterpiece of autobiography and reportage and called it a "classic account" of the conflict.

== Adaptations ==
Basharat Peer is the screenplay writer of Indian Bollywood film Haider, which is a combination of both Hamlet and Curfewed Night.
