= Indrans Jayan =

Indian costume designer

Indrans Jayan is an Indian film costume designer working predominantly in Malayalam films. He won the National Film Award for Best Costume Design in 2009 (Kutty Srank) and 2010 (Namma Gramam). Born in Kumarapuram, Trivandrum, he is the cousin of the Malayalam film actor Indrans. He has worked as costume designer for close to 300 films.

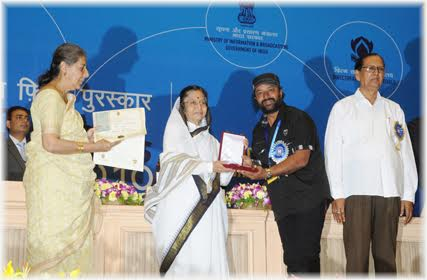
Indrans Jayan Receiving National Film Award for 2010 film Namma Gramam

== Awards ==
National Film Awards

- 2010: Best Costume Design for Gramam Tamil Directed By: Mohan Sharma
- 2009: Best Costume Design for Kutty Srank. Malayalam Directed By: Shaji N. Karun

Kerala State Film Award

- 2011: Veeraputhran- P. T. Kunju Muhammed Malayalam

Other awards

- 2004: Film Critics Award - Kuberan (2002 film) - Sunderdas
- 2011: Surya TV & Film Producers Award - Veeraputhran

== Selected filmography ==
- Jaadhakam
- Radha Madhavam Directed by: Suresh Unnithan and Written by Lohithadas
- Pakshe Directed by: Mohan (director)
- Spadikam Directed by: Bhadran (director)
- Bhoothakkannadi Directed by: A. K. Lohithadas
- Sukrutham Directed by: Harikumar (director)
- Udhyanapalakan Directed by: Harikumar (director)
- Kuberan (2002 film) Directed by: Sundar Das
- Arayannangalude Veedu Directed by: A. K. Lohithadas
- Oru Cheru Punchiri Directed by: M. T. Vasudevan Nair
- Vadhu Doctoranu Directed by: K. K. Haridas
- Katha Nayakan Directed by: Rajasenan
- Kutty Srank Directed by: Shaji N. Karun
- Raamanam Directed by: M. P. Sukumaran Nair
- Veeraputhran Directed by: P. T. Kunju Muhammed
- Sundara Purushan (2001 film) Directed by: Jose Thomas
- Nakshathra koodaram
- Meleparambil Aanveedu
- Aniyan Bava Chetan Bava
- Dilliwala Rajakumaran
- Nadodimannan
- Swapaanam
- Adyathe kanmani
- Kottaram Veettile Apputtan
- Darling Darling
- Namma Gramam
- Gowrishankaram
- AKG
- out of sillubus
- Kunjananthante Kada
- Athishayan
- Sammanam
- Vasanthathinte kanal vazhikal
- April fool
- Ayaal
- Puthukkottayile Puthumanavalan
- Aalavattom
- Malayali maamanu vanakkom
- Our sankeerthanam pole
- Bharya want Ham suhruthu
- Krithyam
- Sadhananthante samayam
- Ammaku our thaarattu
- Onnam Loka Mahayudham
- Chekavar
- Rudrasimhasanam
