= Rajashilpi =

- Poster
- Directed by: R. Sukumaran
- Written by: R. Sukumaran
- Produced by: G. P. Vijayakumar
- Starring: Mohanlal; Bhanupriya
- Cinematography: Madhu Ambat
- Edited by: N. Gopalakrishnan
- Music by: Raveendran; Johnson (score)
- Production company: Savitha Productions
- Distributed by: Seven Arts International
- Release date: 9 July 1992
- Country: India
- Language: Malayalam

Rajashilpi (transl. King's Sculptor) is a 1992 Indian Malayalam-language drama film written and directed by R. Sukumaran, starring Mohanlal and Bhanupriya. The plot is a re-telling of the legend about lord Shiva and goddess Sati who was later reborn as goddess Parvati for the love of Shiva. It was Bhanupriya's first Malayalam film. The film won Cinema Express Award for Best Malayalam Film.

== Plot ==
Rajashilpi is the re-telling of the legend about lord Shiva. The plot of the story is constructed in a way that the events in the legend repeats itself in a new setting with different characters but with the same spiritual auras of the main persons, especially Siva and Sati. The first image of Durga is maintained throughout the film, Durga is the re-incarnated Uma. Only after Durga comes to be aware of her re-incarnated life as Uma that she is able to fall in love with Shambu. Until then her seductive tactics go in vain. The death of Durga's father is shown very differently in the film. It is as if the Shiva is doing his Thandava, the dance of Siva out of his rage that symbolizes destruction of this universe-life of cause and effect.

== Cast ==
- Mohanlal as Shambu
- Bhanupriya as Durga/Uma
- Srividya as Lakshmibhai Thampuraatti
- Nedumudi Venu as Madhavan
- Augustine as Gopalan
- T. R. Omana as Muthassi
- Captain Raju as Bhadran
- Narendra Prasad as Staanu Aashaan
- Jagannadhan
- Santhakumari
- Shyama

== Soundtrack ==
The soundtrack of this movie was composed by Raveendran for which the lyrics were penned by O. N. V. Kurup.

Track	Song title	Singer(s)
1	Ambilikala Choodum	K. S. Chithra
2	Kaveri	K. J. Yesudas, K. S. Chithra
3	Arivin Nilave	K. S. Chithra
4	Poikayil	K. J. Yesudas
5	Punarabhi Jananam	P. Jayachandran
