= Dolly Ahluwalia =

Indian actress and costume designer

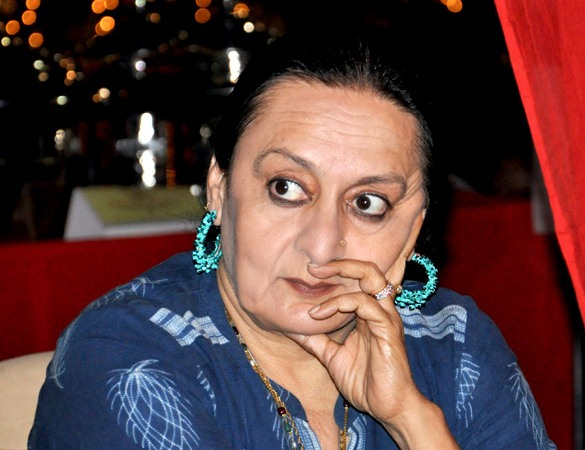
- Occupations: Costume designer, actress
- Years active: 1993–present
- Spouse: Kamal Tiwari
- Awards: Full list

Dolly Ahluwalia is an Indian actress and costume designer who was awarded the Sangeet Natak Akademi Award in 2001 for costume design. She has won 3 Filmfare Awards and three National Film Awards, two Best Costume Design awards for Bandit Queen (1993) and Haider (2014), and then as Best Supporting Actress for Vicky Donor (2012), which is also her best known role as an actress.

== Career ==
She is alumni of National School of Drama graduating in 1979. Ahluwalia started her career by designing costumes for theatre. Thereafter she started film career with Shekhar Kapur's Bandit Queen in 1993, which got her first National Film Award for Best Costume Design. Thereafter she designed for notable directors like Vishal Bhardwaj in The Blue Umbrella (2005), Omkara (2006), Blood Brothers (2007), Kaminey (2009) and Haider (2014), with Deepa Mehta in Water (2005) and Midnight's Children (2012). Besides working with mainstream Bollywood films like Love Aaj Kal (2009), Luv Shuv Tey Chicken Khurana (2012) and with Rakeysh Omprakash Mehra in Bhaag Milkha Bhaag (2013).

== Filmography ==
=== Costume designer ===
Year	Film
1993	Bandit Queen
2006	Omkara
2005	Water
2005	The Blue Umbrella
2007	Aaja Nachle
2007	Blood Brothers
2009	Love Aaj Kal
2009	Kaminey
2011	Rockstar
2012	Luv Shuv Tey Chicken Khurana
2012	Midnight's Children
2013	Bhaag Milkha Bhaag
2014	Haider
2017	Rangoon

=== Actress ===
Year	Title	Role
1995	Amma and Family (TV series)	
2003	Mudda – The Issue	
2005	Yahaan	
2005	Water	
2005	The Blue Umbrella	
2009	Aloo Chaat	Beeji
2011	Ek Noor	
2012	Vicky Donor	Dolly Arora
2012	Luv Shuv Tey Chicken Khurana	Buaji
2013	Saadi Love Story (Punjabi)	Mrs. Brar
2013	Bajatey Raho	Jasbeer Baweja
2013	Yeh Jawaani Hai Deewani	Simran Talwar
2019	Badnaam Gali	Buaji
2019	Axone	Naani
2020	Doordarshan	Darshan Kaur
2021	Bell Bottom	Raavie Malhotra
2023	Chhatriwali	Dhingra Aunty
2023	Thank You for Coming	Kishori Kapoor
2024-2025	Lovely Lolla	Shakuntala Chawla
2025	Sitaare Zameen Par	Preeto
2025	Son of Sardaar 2	Bebe
2025	Calorie	Gurdeep
2025	The Great Shamsuddin Family	Asiya
2026	Main Vaapas Aaunga	Keenu's Grandmother
