= Rick McGinnis =

Canadian photographer and writer

Rick McGinnis is a Canadian photographer and writer, and was previously a columnist for Metro newspapers across Canada. He wrote a sardonic daily TV column called Idiot Box along with DVD reviews, restaurant reviews, entertainment features and even recaps of reality shows. His daily television column was cancelled in early 2009 when Metro laid off all of its writers. He is currently a freelance writer whose work appears in the Toronto Star among other venues.

Rick's photography has appeared in Metro, Now Magazine, Toronto Life, the National Post, The Globe and Mail, the Toronto Star, the Village Voice, the New York Times, Esquire, SPIN, Vogue (US), Entertainment Weekly and many other publications. Examples of his work can be found on his website. He has shot a number of album covers, including several for jazz musician Jane Bunnett and Gordon Lightfoot's 1993 album Waiting For You. In 2014 he began a blog, Some Old Pictures I Took, devoted to his three decades as a photographer.

Photos published on Some Old Pictures, some for the first time, have ended up in box sets by White Zombie, Natalie Merchant and Fela Kuti, and an unpublished portrait of the writer Jay McInerney was featured in a New Yorker article on the writer.

In the fall of 2018 McGinnis decided to bring Some Old Pictures I Took to an end, in the interest of publicizing new work on a new blog, Rick McGinnis Photographs. To commemorate the end of the Old Pictures blog, he self-published a trio of photozines - MUSIC, SQUARE and STARS, each devoted to an aspect of his work over thirty years, with photos published on the blog. In 2019 he published three new photozines on Blurb, FACES, JAZZ and INSTAGRAM.
