= R. Sukumaran =

Indian film director

R Sukumaran
- Occupations: Screenplay writer; Film director; Painter

R. Sukumaran is an Indian film director, who works in Malayalam films.

== Career ==
Sukumaran's entry into film-making was incidental. While on an exhibition in Germany, he was invited to make a movie and thus began his work as a director. His first movie was Paadha Mudra which was both critically and commercially successful. The movie explored the father-son relationship. This was followed by Rajashilpi which bordered on the realms of fantasy. Yugapurushan, released in February 2010, had been in the making for over fifteen years.

Though Sukumaran has made few films, they were "enough to establish him as a filmmaker worth reckoning" with and to give him a reputation in Malayalam cinema.

He studied painting and mastered water color as well as oil color under Artist Mouttathu K Raman Unnithan (Medayil Bungalow) at Pallickal, Nooranadu in a gurukula sampradaya for several years.

== Filmography ==
- Paadha Mudra (1988)
- Rajashilpi (1992)
- Yugapurushan (2010)
