= Seer Hamdan =

Seer Hamdan Anantnag

Seer Hamdan is a town in the Anantnag district of Jammu and Kashmir in India. It has a population of 20,233 people.

== Economy and culture ==
Seer Hamdan is known for its scenery, sports stadium, skill development I.T. I and Forest Research Centre popularly known as "Sandoz". The area has a water channel known as "Shah Kol" that was constructed by the eighth Sultan of Shah Mir dynasty of Kashmir Zain-ul-Abidin who was known by his subjects as Bod Shah (lit. 'Great King') for irrigation purposes and now it irrigates hectares of land of this town and adjacent villages.

There is a subdistrict hospital which caters to the heavy rush of patients from the adjacent areas.

=== Religious tourism ===
Seer Hamdan is 13 km from the main town Anantnag and falls on KP (Khanbal-Pahalgam) road which leads to the tourist destination Pahalgam and also serves a route for Holy Amarnath Cave through which every year thousands of Yatris travel.

Seer Hamdan is the site of a holy relic of Muhammad which is preserved in Hazratbal Shrine Seer Hamdan which is also a place of attraction for thousands of devotees of Islam. As well as this shrine, there is also another holy shrine of Mir Sayyid Ali Hamadani, located in the middle of the town.

One of the tributaries of the Jhelum River, known as "Lidder", flows through the town.
