= Haider (film) =

2014 film by Vishal Bhardwaj

- Theatrical release poster
- Directed by: Vishal Bhardwaj
- Written by: Basharat Peer; Vishal Bhardwaj
- Story by: Vishal Bhardwaj
- Based on: Hamlet by William Shakespeare
- Produced by: Vishal Bhardwaj; Siddharth Roy Kapur
- Starring: Shahid Kapoor; Tabu; Shraddha Kapoor; Kay Kay Menon; Irrfan Khan
- Cinematography: Pankaj Kumar
- Edited by: Aarif Sheikh
- Music by: Vishal Bhardwaj
- Production companies: UTV Motion Pictures; VB Pictures
- Distributed by: UTV Motion Pictures
- Release date: 2 October 2014
- Running time: 160 minutes
- Country: India
- Language: Hindi
- Budget: ₹35 crore
- Box office: ₹85 crore

Haider is a 2014 Indian Hindi-language political action thriller film directed by Vishal Bhardwaj, who co-produced it with Siddharth Roy Kapur, and written by Bhardwaj and Basharat Peer. It stars Shahid Kapoor, Tabu, Kay Kay Menon, Shraddha Kapoor and Irrfan Khan.

Set amidst the insurgency-hit Kashmir conflicts of 1995, Haider is a modern-day adaptation of William Shakespeare's tragedy Hamlet. It is also based on Basharat Peer's memoir Curfewed Night. Haider, a young student and a poet, returns to Kashmir at the peak of the conflict to seek answers about his father's disappearance and ends up being tugged into the politics of the state. Haider is the third installment of Bhardwaj's Shakespearean trilogy after Maqbool (2003) and Omkara (2006).

The film was screened at the 19th Busan International Film Festival, and released worldwide on 2 October 2014 to widespread critical acclaim; it was a major commercial success, earning ₹85 crore worldwide and garnering attention from the media due to its controversial subject matter. The subject matter, direction, story, screenplay, film score, cinematography, editing, and performances of the ensemble cast received high critical praise and garnered several accolades. However, the film faced backlash for its graphic depiction of alleged human rights abuses and torture by Indian security forces in Kashmir, which many described as an "unfair" portrayal of the armed forces. Hindu nationalist groups accused it of sympathizing with separatists and launched a boycott campaign, while some audiences and commentators labelled it provocation or propaganda. The film was banned in Pakistan.

Haider was the first Indian film to win the People's Choice Award at the Rome Film Festival. At the 62nd National Film Awards, Haider won a leading 5 awards: Best Music Direction (Bhardwaj), Best Male Playback Singer (Sukhwinder Singh for "Bismil"), Best Dialogue (Bhardwaj), Best Choreography (Sudesh Adhana for "Bismil") and Best Costume Design (Dolly Ahluwalia). At the 60th Filmfare Awards, Haider received 9 nominations, including Best Film and Best Director (Bhardwaj), and won 5 awards including Best Actor (Shahid Kapoor), Best Supporting Actor (Menon) and Best Supporting Actress (Tabu).

== Plot ==
During the insurgency in Kashmir, which continues through 1995, Hilaal Meer, a doctor based in Srinagar, agrees to perform an appendectomy on Ikhlaque, the leader of a terrorist group; to avoid detection, he performs the surgery at his house, much to the chagrin of his wife Ghazala, who questions his allegiance. The following day, during a military raid, Hilaal is accused of harboring terrorists. A shootout ensues at his home, during which Ikhlaque is killed and Hilaal is taken away for questioning. The doctor's house is subsequently bombed to kill any other terrorists hiding inside.

Sometime later, Ghazala's son Haider returns from Aligarh Muslim University to seek answers about his father's disappearance. Upon arrival, he is shocked to find his mother singing and laughing along with her brother-in-law, Khurram, Hilaal's younger brother. Unable to understand Ghazala's behavior, he begins searching for Hilaal in various police stations and detention camps with the help of his childhood sweetheart Arshia Lone, a journalist, whose father, Pervez, is a police officer.

Winter arrives in Kashmir. Saddened by the growing closeness between Ghazala and Khurram, and still unable to find any leads, Haider begins to lose hope. However, Arshia encounters a stranger, Roohdaar, who has Haider contact him to receive information regarding his missing father. Roohdaar, who is part of a pro-separatist group, explains that he and Hilaal were both imprisoned in a detention camp by a counterinsurgency militia formed by Khurram. The group had both Hilaal and Roohdaar executed, but Roohdaar survived and is meeting Haider to pass on Hilaal's final wish: for Haider to take revenge on Khurram for his betrayal.

Devastated and enraged, Haider begins behaving erratically, shaving his head and staging public demonstrations against the government and AFSPA. Khurram takes him aside and claims that Roohdaar was responsible for Hilaal's death; Haider is put off by the conflicting claims of Hilaal's demise despite knowing the truth himself, and confides his dilemma to Arshia, showing her the gun given to him to kill Khurram. Arshia, in turn, confides about Haider's actions to Pervez, who in turn passes the information forward to Khurram, who orders Haider institutionalized during a ceremony officiating his marriage to Ghazala.

The following morning, Haider prepares to kill Khurram, but morally abstains from it on seeing that Khurram is in prayer. He is captured by Pervez, who orders him executed. However, Haider escapes and brutally murders his two captors, the Salmans, former friends of his who became informants for Pervez while he was away. He contacts Roohdaar, who suggests that he travel to Pakistan to receive military training. Haider calls Ghazala to inform her that he is going across the border, but Ghazala meets with him before he leaves at the ruins of their family home. She admits informing Khurram about the presence of terrorists in her home on the day of Hilaal's arrest, but claims to have been unaware at the time that Khurram was Pervez's informant. Pervez receives word of Haider's whereabouts and arrives at the house to assassinate him, but Haider kills him first and escapes.

Arshia is emotionally traumatized by learning of her father's death at the hands of her lover, and commits suicide. Meanwhile, Ghazala finds Roohdaar's contact number in Arshia's diary and calls him. Haider goes to his pickup point, the graveyard where Hilaal was buried. However, he spots a nearby funeral, which he realizes is for Arshia. He defies the advice of his handlers and interrupts the procession, leading to a fight with Arshia's brother, Liyaqat, who dies in the scuffle. Khurram and his men arrive at the house, engaging in a gunfight that leaves most of Khurram's men dead. Ghazala is dropped off at the house by Roohdaar and begs Khurram for a chance to get Haider to surrender. Haider remains insistent on revenge, but Ghazala warns him that revenge merely begets revenge. She bids him farewell and returns to Khurram's men, where she detonates a suicide vest given to her by Roohdaar. Khurram is gravely injured and his men killed; Haider prepares to kill him, but remembers Ghazala's parting words discouraging revenge. He walks away from the site of the blast, despite Khurram's pleas to end his life.

== Cast ==
- Shahid Kapoor as Haider Meer (Based on Prince Hamlet)
  - Anshuman Malhotra as young Haider
- Tabu as Ghazala Meer, Haider's mother (Based on Gertrude)
- Shraddha Kapoor as Arshia Lone (Based on Ophelia/Horatio)
- Kay Kay Menon as Khurram Meer, Haider's paternal uncle (Based on King Claudius)
- Irrfan Khan as Roohdaar (special appearance) (Based on The Ghost)
- Narendra Jha as Dr. Hilal Meer, Haider's father (Based on King Hamlet)
- Kulbhushan Kharbanda as Hussain Meer
- Lalit Parimoo as Pervez Lone (Based on Polonius)
- Ashish Vidyarthi as Brigadier T. S. Murthy
- Aamir Bashir as Liqayat Lone, Arshiya's brother (Based on Laertes)
- Sumit Kaul as Salman 1 Courtier (Based on Rosencrantz)
- Rajat Bhagat as Salam 2 Courtier (Based on Guildenstern)
- Ashwath Bhatt as Zahoor Hussain (Based on Fortinbras)

== Production ==
=== Development ===
Vishal Bhardwaj first ought to direct romantic film 2 States and ask Shah Rukh Khan to play to role. However, Khan rejected it for playing back to back romantic films, and wanted a darker role, so he asked Bhardwaj to cast him in Haider, but Bhardwaj rejected back. Initially, Vishal Bhardwaj and Shahid Kapoor were in talks of making a sequel to their previous collaboration, the action drama Kaminey (2009). The project was put on hold and a new project with Kapoor in the lead was confirmed, titled as Haider, which was reportedly based on an adaptation of William Shakespeare's Hamlet. The adaptation was made to portray the political intrigue and history of Kashmir as well as the play's sexual conflicts.

Bhardwaj was initially developing the play as a contemporary espionage thriller with author Stephen Alter. They wrote a 30-page synopsis that was sent to Gulzar. Though Gulzar liked the synopsis, he enquired Bhardwaj of the missing tragedy of Hamlet in the penned thriller. The synopsis had incomplete details about the life, authenticity and the Official Secrets Act of RAW agents. On his return to India, Bharadwaj's wife Rekha Bhardwaj was reading Basharat Peer's memoir, Curfewed Night, a book based on life in violence-wrecked Kashmir. Rekha was deeply moved after reading the book. Bharadwaj didn't immediately read the book but was aware about its content. Later, Bhardwaj desired to change the synopsis. Remembering Peer's book, he contacted him and they started working on the script. Bhardwaj quoted Peer's importance in the film as, "If Basharat was not a part of the film, Haider wouldn't be made or it wouldn't be made this way." The film is Peer's first film project. On co-scripting the same, he stated that writing Curfewed Night was a response to caricatures of Kashmiris in Indian political writing whereas he wrote Haider in the same spirit, with the same feeling with Bhardwaj.

Bhardwaj and Peer agonised a lot over the soliloquies required. There were sections of the To be, or not to be speech that was translated directly in Hindi. Due to constraints of time they had to omit the Apparel maketh a man soliloquy though. They retained and translated the section where Hamlet meets Rosencrantz and Guildenstern and speaks about Denmark being in prison. Further, new soliloquies were created to convey Hamlet's madness and the veiled political satire in it. This was brought in when Haider with his head shaved, dressed in torn, shabby clothes rants on a traffic roundabout in Srinagar and apart from a few senseless jokes, reads out the bare act of the Armed Forces Special Powers Act. Apart from this, Peer explained that an adaptation doesn't exactly follow the original, like the part of Fortinbras was barely there in Haider. The world of King Claudius and Polonius is portrayed as the counter-insurgency and government-run, counter-insurgent militias in Haider and thematically dominates the action.

"It was the political turmoil and the 25 years of tragedy of Kashmir that compelled me. Our way of looking at Kashmir has either been cosmetic – only for shooting songs – or rhetoric, where we show a man in a phiran, holding a Kalashnikov. Haider is the first film where we see Kashmir from the inside. I don't think we have made a mainstream film about the issue."

— Bhardwaj on setting Haider in Kashmir (in an interview with The Indian Express)

As per the story of Hamlet, an Oedipus complex exists that draws Hamlet (played by Shahid Kapoor) towards his mother Gertrude (played by Tabu) that could have been interpreted both at a physical and psychological level, however, Bhardwaj kept this reference subtle as the target audience was predominantly Indian and called it 'one of the aspects in this mother-son relationship.' In his previous outing of Othello's adaptation, Omkara (2006), he removed the last monologue due to the fact that it was more suited for a stage play sequence but retained that type of monologue for Haider. Shahid Kapoor learnt a 6-page monologue for the climactic scene where his character Haider turns mad. He put forth the delivery of that monologue in front of a crowd of 5000 listening. For filming the scene, which was done in 3–4 hours, Shahid Kapoor was made completely bald.

Sumit Kaul, who played the character of one of the Salmans, was involved in training the Kashmiri accent of actress Tabu apart from lead actors Shahid and Shraddha. His portions of filming were canned in 15 days, however, he was with the team for 2 1/2 months in Kashmir. He taught the nuances of how a native Kashmiri would speak in English or Hindi.

"I sat with both Shahid and Shraddha and tutored them to speak Hindi with a Kashmiri touch."

— Sumit Kaul reflecting on his role during the filming of Haider (in an interview with BollywoodLife.com)

Kaul also helped actress Tabu get the enunciation when she sang the folk song "Roshe Valle" that was a part of the film score.

"Ghazala is torn between her idealistic husband, her opportunistic brother-in-law, and her innocent and passionate son. Somewhere, she feels she has the responsibility to keep everything in control, but obviously she can't. Her love for her son is crazy. She is always trying to protect him from being misled and misguided. He (Bhardwaj) cast me as Shahid's mother because he wanted the oddity of the relationship to come out which wouldn't have come across with a regular aged mother-and-son combination. Haider shares a love-hate relationship with Ghazala, but it's a very passionate emotion. You almost feel odd that these two are mom and son. Haider's predicament is that he doesn't know what to do with his mother—whether to love her, hate her, believe her or kill her."

— Actress Tabu who plays the character "Ghazala", in an interview with The Indian Express.

Kapoor, along with Bhardwaj and UTV Motion Pictures, each have a 33.3% share in the film. The budget for the film is ₹390 million (US$4.0 million) taking into account ₹240 million (US$2.5 million) spent into the production of the film and ₹150 million (US$1.6 million) for promotions.

Dolly Ahluwalia designed the costumes for the film. She began working by creating Kashmiri designs of costumes in Delhi. When Bhardwaj and Pankaj Kumar, the film's cinematographer were doing a recce in the valley of Kashmir, she was there to share her creative vision with him. She took her sketches and swatches there. She returned to Delhi and continued with her work there. Instead of picking up costumes easily available in bazaars of Kashmir, she designed the phirans for Shahid Kapoor, and the hijabs and head-scarves for both Tabu and Shraddha Kapoor. Ahluwalia was quoted saying, "Somewhere along the way her husband disappears and she marries his brother who is wealthier than him, and this change in marital status is explained through richer colors and fabrics." She added that her real challenge was exploring the psyche of the character of Haider through colors, textures and cuts. The signs of madness in his character are depicted through the pom-poms in his cap during the track "Bismil" that is a manifestation of the traditional folk dance Dumhal of the Kashmiri valley performed by Wattal tribes. For the costumes seen in climax portions, she was quoted saying, "Against the white snowy backdrop, I stuck to black and reds to bring out the cold of the human mind through the cold snow and the death of romance in blood red hues."

=== Filming ===
Haider was shot in 2 parts. The first schedule was in November–December 2013 and then next in January–February 2014. Keeping the weather conditions in consideration, the first part of the film is shot in autumn-winter and the second part featuring intense drama and action sequences in snowy weather. The entire filming was completed in 54 days.

Principal photography began at Dal Lake in November 2013. Haider was filmed at Pahalgam, Kehribal area in Anantnag, Mattan, Aishan Sahab Zaina Kadal Bridge in old Srinagar, Nishat Bagh, Qazigund, Martand Sun Temple, Naseem Bagh (at Kashmir University Garden), Hazratbal and Sonamarg, all of which are located in Jammu and Kashmir Bhardwaj was forced to pack up after a group of Kashmir University students disrupted shooting of a sequence of a Fedayeen attack which was being canned at the University of Kashmir at Hazratbal. The students objected to the hoisting of the national flag atop a makeshift bunker. A few students objected to the shooting of a few scenes and started "pro-freedom" slogans, dismantling the stage. The youngsters also forced them out of the shooting location in Naseem Bagh (Kashmir University Garden) despite heavy security, claiming that they had no idea about the shoot happening on that location. Students of Kashmir University also raised objection to Irrfan Khan when he was spotted smoking inside the campus. The last filming schedule of Haider began in Kashmir in January 2014. For the song "Bismil" shot at Martand Sun Temple in Kashmir, Shahid Kapoor was quoted saying, "It is one of the best shot songs of my career. The location, the elements like face-paint to depict war-like situations, have been used in 'Bismil'. Then there are 100 feet tall puppets, which I have never seen in any song before." For the choreography of the songs, Bhardwaj was very keen that Shahid's character didn't have any dance movements that Shahid did in his previous films as it was required for the character's angst and feelings. Bhardwaj recruited a Norway-based choreographer for the choreography of this track. The shooting of the film was also halted briefly for a second time in Zainakadal in Srinagar in January 2014, when a spectator threw coal towards the actors. Filming was completed by 24 February 2014.

=== Certification ===
After 41 cuts, the Central Board of Film Certification (CBFC) gave the film a U/A certificate. The scenes that were censored were a truck load of corpses, wire being inserted inside a naked man, a shot of a bloody dead body and abusive words. Apart from this, a shot of a bare back during the song "Khul Kabhi To" was also considered offensive and censored. The CBFC demanded deletion of a scene where Haider (played by Shahid Kapoor) cries on seeing flames. A confusion arose when Rakesh Kumar, the CEO of CBFC along with an examining committee saw the film and prescribed the cuts. After the film was re-edited, instead of sending it to the revising committee for reviewing, Kumar himself watched the film again and gave it a U/A certificate. Nandini Sardesai, a member of the revising committee told The Times of India that Kumar saw Haider twice and passed it with a U/A certificate. She stated that director of the film Vishal Bhardwaj had apparently agreed to the cuts. Later, Bhardwaj clarified that the CBFC only demanded 7 cuts but gave his film 35 extra cuts in order to make the script look more realistic. Bhardwaj added that since the film is set in Kashmir and given the associated troubled politics of the state, he knew the film would land in controversies.

The controversy over film's plot, analysts stated that India has become more open to sensitive subjects. Dr. Zakir Hussain, a senior analyst at the Indian Council of World Affairs was quoted saying, "As democratic traditions strengthen in the country, more and more such movies will be made and people will be educated. Haider is the first step in that direction." Director Bhardwaj faced criticism over the depiction of the armed forces in an allegedly unfair way as the film also portrayed scenes of torture in Indian army camps and abuse of human rights by Indian officials. To this portrayal, Indian Twitter users, filled with sentiments brought up hashtagging of words "#BoycottHaider" that generated estimate 75,000 tweets since the film release. In reply to this criticism, people on Twitter started trending #HaiderTrueCinema which trended for 2 days and this caused #BoycottHaider to be withdrawn from the list of trending topics on Twitter.

It was also denied certification and banned by the Pakistan Central Board of Film Censors for depicting the sensitive issue of the Kashmir insurgency.

== Music ==
The original songs and film score are composed by Vishal Bhardwaj. The soundtrack has nine songs whose lyrics are penned by Gulzar, except for 2 songs "Gulon Mein Rang Bhare" and "Aaj Ke Naam" that were written by Faiz Ahmed Faiz. Shahid Kapoor and Shraddha Kapoor launched the music of the film along with Vishal Bhardwaj at Radio Mirchi studios in Mumbai in mid-August 2014. The soundtrack had a digital as well as physical release on 12 September 2014. The film score was digitally released on 24 October 2014.

== Reception ==
=== Critical response ===
Haider received widespread critical acclaim upon release for its subject matter, direction, story, screenplay, film score, cinematography, editing, and performances, with major praise directed to Shahid Kapoor. On the review aggregator website Rotten Tomatoes, 88% of 17 critics' reviews are positive, with an average rating of 7.62/10.

==== India ====
Writing for The Hindu, Sudhish Kamath felt, "Lyricist Gulzar, writer-director Vishal Bhardwaj, and writer Basharat Peer have given us an instant classic, a literary epic (the screenplay is out in the stores too) with a lesson to learn from recent history. Haider is an incredibly brave uncompromising film made with loads of conviction with blatant disregard to market conventions, one that will make you cheer during the meta-moment in the film." Rajeev Masand of CNN-IBN called that film an elegant, thrilling one that casts a brave, unflinching eye on the Kashmir struggle. He noted, "In deviating from the original ending of Hamlet, it also makes a necessary point about the cyclical nature of revenge and violence". He gave the film 3.5 out of 5 stars. Writing for Deccan Chronicle, Kusumita Das who compared the film to the book summarized, "Considering Hamlet, with all its complexity, is certainly not an easy adaptation to venture into – that alone could well make this Vishal's finest film yet." Subhash K. Jha with immense praise felt, "Haider is a beast that just won't be tamed by regular cinematic definitions. There is flamboyance and subtlety, both at once in the treatment. Elegance and earthiness rub shoulders in the execution of what is regarded as one of Shakespeare's most complex tragedies. Above all, there are the performances – towering, luminous actors craning their collective creative necks into the director's vision, to give it mesmerizing magical spin. Mr. Bhardwaj's third Shakespearean sojourn is his best yet. Haider is like a painting viewed from the road inside an art gallery. The vision is distant yet vivid, layered life-like and yet exquisitely poetic."

Raja Sen of Rediff gave the film 5 out of 5 stars and wrote: "Haider is one of the most powerful political films we've ever made, a bona-fide masterpiece that throbs with intensity and purpose". Writing for Mid-Day, Shubha Shetty-Saha said "Vishal Bharadwaj brings alive the ecstasy, pain and passion of Hamlet on screen, he also reminds us of the harsh truth in our own backyard, the man-made mayhem in the God-made jannat [heaven] that is Kashmir". Faheem Ruhani for India Today praised the Even the oedipal theme between characters played by Shahid Kapoor and Tabu, summarizing his review as, "Haider may seem a bit sluggish in the first-half and slightly long. However, it makes up for most of it in the dramatic, intense climax that you are treated to towards the end. Haider is definitely a film you should not miss." Zee News's critic Ritika Handoo reviewed positively, "William Shakespeare's Hamlet is a masterpiece in literature, and Vishal Bhardwaj's Haider will be talked about in the same vein as one such artistic product in cinematic history. Haider will be recognized as Shahid's career-best performance." Srijana Mitra Das of The Times of India called the film "one of cinema's bravest takes on identity, frightening, yet fun" and particularly praised Tabu's performance whom she considered the prime-asset of the film. Sweta Kaushal for Hindustan Times noted, "Vishal Bhardwaj's Haider is a rare Bollywood gem you must watch." Writing for Filmfare, Rachit Gupta felt, "Haider doesn't have an ounce of the commercial thrills and spills that entertain the 100-crore masses. But it does have an undeniable dramatic punch. It is one of the best stories you'll every watch on celluloid. Give this edgy film a chance to entertain you. Because it will do so with aplomb. It's certainly better than the other chutzpah out there." On the contrary, Shubhra Gupta of The Indian Express felt the storytelling falters, quoting that, "It is a gorgeous but choppy film that you cannot take your eyes off for fear of losing another exquisite piece of detailing; it is also one that fails to fully keep you with it."

==== International ====
Mike McHill of The Guardian wrote, "Radical Indian version of Hamlet gives the story compelling political angles and musical surprises. A palpable hit, in any language." Rachel Saltz of The New York Times titled her critical review as, "Shakespearean Revenge in a Violent Kashmir" emphasizing more on script and directorial aspects, noting, "Haider may not be the equal of Mr. Bhardwaj's other Shakespeare films, and it may be deficient in the "Hamlet" department, but it certainly gives good Gertrude." At The Hollywood Reporter, Lisa Tsering was more positive on the film, summarizing, "With Haider, Bhardwaj wisely forgoes the rough-edged attitude in his other films to embrace a slicker and more sophisticated style; and some of the film's most effective moments are masterful in their visual storytelling skill." Writing for Digital Spy, Priya Joshi praised the film, calling it a "masterclass in film-making and performance" and "an exemplary cinema and a work of great artistic merit", She added, "Shahid Kapoor is a standard-bearer for a generation." Suprateek Chatterjee of the Firstpost praised the performances of Shahid Kapoor and Tabu, thereby calling it "his best film so far". Praising the key aspects of the movie, critic Manjusha Radhakrishnan for Gulf News writes, "Everything about Haider is subtle: including the undertones of the infamous sexual tension between mother and son. Tabu and Shahid Kapoor surrender themselves completely to their roles and are endearingly uninhibited. The pace is never hurried, so be a bit patient and give these superbly talented actors a chance. Just like the cinematography that captures Kashmir's rugged beauty, Haider will wow you with its raw appeal." On writing for Emirates 24/7, Sneha May Francis opined, "Haider does appear a little over indulgent, but considering Vishal had such a Herculean task at hand, it's just a small price to pay for good cinema. Shakespearean tragedy Hamlet gets a sinfully delightful adaptation by master filmmaker Vishal Bhardwaj". Ryan Gilbey based at New Statesman claimed, "The idea of a Bollywood Hamlet throws up all manner of preconceptions. But Haider transpires to be a far less irreverent interpretation than, say, the 2000 US version in which Ethan Hawke delivered the "To be or not to be" soliloquy from the "Action" section of Blockbuster Video. Bhardwaj relocates the action to Kashmir in the mid-1990s. If the graft doesn't quite take, it's because the film is so persuasive in portraying the oppression of the Kashmiri people that the woes of Hamlet seem small beer."

=== Box office ===
The film earned ₹850 million worldwide.

== Awards and nominations ==
At the 62nd National Film Awards, Haider won 5 awards, including Best Music Direction and Best Dialogue (both Bhardwaj). At the 60th Filmfare Awards, Haider received 9 nominations, including Best Film and Best Director (Bhardwaj), and won 5 awards including Best Actor (Shahid Kapoor), Best Supporting Actor (Menon) and Best Supporting Actress (Tabu).
