= National Film Award for Best Costume Design =

Indian film award

- National award for contributions to Indian Cinema
- Awarded for: Best costume design for the feature films for a year
- Sponsored by: National Film Development Corporation of India
- Rewards: Rajat Kamal (Silver Lotus); ₹2,00,000
- First award: 1984
- Most recent winner: Deepali Noor and Sheetal Sharma, Pushpa 2: The Rule (2024)

The National Film Award for Best Costume Design is one of the National Film Awards presented annually by the National Film Development Corporation of India. It is one of several awards presented for feature films and awarded with Rajat Kamal (Silver Lotus).

The award was instituted in 1984, at 32nd National Film Awards and awarded annually for films produced in the year across the country, in all Indian languages.

== Multiple wins ==
• 4 wins : Neeta Lulla

• 2 wins : Bhanu Athaiya, P. Krishnamoorthy, Indrans Jayan, Dolly Ahluwalia

== Recipients ==
Award includes 'Rajat Kamal' (Silver Lotus) and cash prize. Neeta Lulla has majority of wins in this category with four.

Following are the award winners over the years:

List of award recipients, showing the year (award ceremony), film(s), language(s) and citation
Year	Recipient(s)	Film(s)	Language(s)	Refs.
1984 (32nd)	Harudas	Ghare Baire	Bengali	
1984 (32nd)	Bapuldas	Ghare Baire	Bengali	
1985 (33rd)	Saba Zaidi	Trikal	Hindi	
1986 (34th)	Prabhat Jha	Parinati	Hindi	
1987 (35th)	Ramilla Patel	Pestonjee	Hindi	
1987 (35th)	Mani Rabadi	Pestonjee	Hindi	
1988 (36th)	Sudharshan	Daasi	Telugu	
1989 (37th)	P. Krishnamoorthy	Oru Vadakkan Veeragatha	Malayalam	
1990 (38th)	Bhanu Athaiya	Lekin...	Hindi	
1991 (39th)	Neeta Lulla	Lamhe	Hindi	
1991 (39th)	Kachins	Lamhe	Hindi	
1991 (39th)	Leena Daru	Lamhe	Hindi	
1992 (40th)	Mala Dey	Rudaali	Hindi	
1992 (40th)	Simple Kapadia	Rudaali	Hindi	
1993 (41st)	Loveleen Bains	Muhafiz	Urdu	
1994 (42nd)	Supriya Dasgupta	Amodini	Bengali	
1995 (43rd)	Dolly Ahluwalia	Bandit Queen	Hindi	
1996 (44th)	M. Dandapani	Kulam	Malayalam	
1997 (45th)	Vaishali Kasaravalli	Thaayi Saheba	Kannada	
1998 (46th)	S. B. Satheeshan	Daya	Malayalam	
1999 (47th)	Sarika	Hey Ram	Tamil	
2000 (48th)	P. Krishnamoorthy	Bharati	Tamil	
2001 (49th)	Bhanu Athaiya	Lagaan	Hindi	
2002 (50th)	Neeta Lulla	Devdas	Hindi	
2002 (50th)	Abu Jani	Devdas	Hindi	
2002 (50th)	Sandeep Khosla	Devdas	Hindi	
2002 (50th)	Reza Shariffi	Devdas	Hindi	
2003 (51st)	Bibi Ray	Chokher Bali	Bengali	
2003 (51st)	Sushanto Pal	Chokher Bali	Bengali	
2004 (52nd)	Ishrath Nissar	Hasina	Kannada	
2005 (53rd)	Anna Singh	Taj Mahal: An Eternal Love Story	Hindi	
2005 (53rd)	Sabyasachi Mukherjee	Black	Hindi	
2006 (54th)	Manjeet Maan	Waris Shah: Ishq Daa Waaris	Punjabi	
2007 (55th)	Ruma Sengupta	Krishnakanter Will	Bengali	
2008 (56th)	Neeta Lulla	Jodhaa Akbar	Hindi	
2009 (57th)	Indrans Jayan	Kutty Srank	Malayalam	
2010 (58th)	Indrans Jayan	Namma Gramam	Tamil	
2011 (59th)	Neeta Lulla	Balgandharva	Marathi	
2011 (59th)	Niharika Khan	The Dirty Picture	Hindi	
2012 (60th)	Poornima Ramaswamy	Paradesi	Tamil	
2013 (61st)	Sabarni Das	Jaatishwar	Bengali	
2014 (62nd)	Dolly Ahluwalia	Haider	Hindi	
2015 (63rd)	Payal Saluja	Nanak Shah Fakir	Punjabi	
2016 (64th)	Sachin Lovalekar	Cycle	Marathi	
2017 (65th)	Gobinda Mandal	Nagarkirtan	Bengali	
2018 (66th)	Indrakshi Pattanaik	Mahanati	Telugu	
2018 (66th)	Gaurang Shah	Mahanati	Telugu	
2018 (66th)	Archana Rao	Mahanati	Telugu	
2019 (67th)	Sujith Sudhakaran	Marakkar: Lion of the Arabian Sea	Malayalam	
2019 (67th)	V. Sai	Marakkar: Lion of the Arabian Sea	Malayalam	
2020 (68th)	Nachiket Barve	Tanhaji	Hindi	
2020 (68th)	Mahesh Sherla	Tanhaji	Hindi	
2021 (69th)	Veera Kapur Ee	Sardar Udham	Hindi	
2022 (70th)	Niki Joshi	Kutch Express	Gujarati	
2023 (71st)	Sachin Lovalekar	Sam Bahadur	Hindi	
2023 (71st)	Divvya Gambhir	Sam Bahadur	Hindi	
2023 (71st)	Nidhhi Gambhir	Sam Bahadur	Hindi	
2024 (72nd)	Deepali Noor	Pushpa 2: The Rule	Telugu	
2024 (72nd)	Sheetal Sharma	Pushpa 2: The Rule	Telugu	
