= Raaga.com =

Indian music streaming service

Raaga
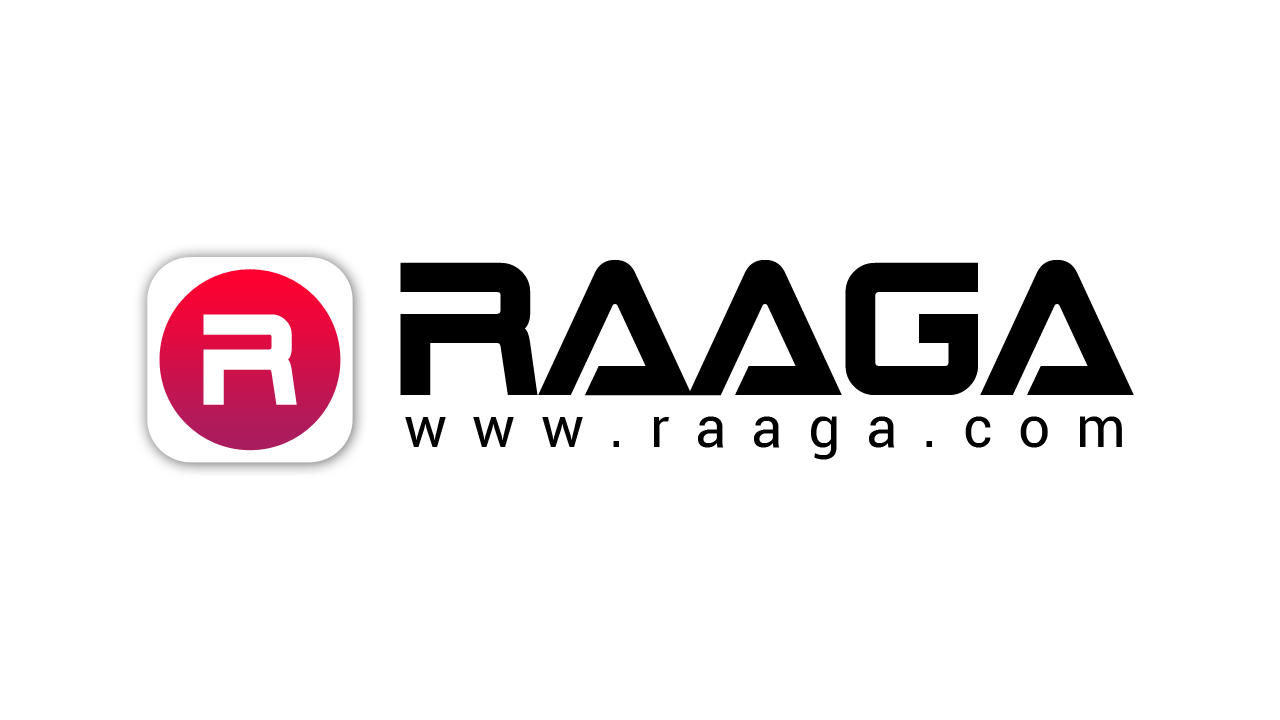
- Key people: Senthil Venkat (CEO & Founder of Raaga.com)
- Launch date: 2006; 19 years ago
- Platforms: Windows; Android; Android TV; Chrome Web Store; iOS
- Availability: Worldwide
- Website: www.raaga.com

Raaga is an Indian music streaming service, providing songs, podcasts and videos in various languages like Hindi, Tamil, Malayalam, Telugu, Kannada, Bengali, Gujarati, Punjabi, Marathi, Bhojpuri, Sanskrit and genres like Carnatic music, Hindustani classical music and others. The logo of the site contains its slogan: "A world of music".

The music streaming service is free to users and is supported by advertisements. Mobile applications are available for iPhone, Android, and applications are also available for Android TV, Apple TV and Amazon Fire TV. They've also added support for Android Auto, Apple Carplay and available on Amazon Alexa devices.

Since 2019, Raaga has ventured into producing its original content in the regional languages mostly Hindi, Telugu, Tamil, and English. Along with the launch of its original shows, the service has launched Raaga Talk dedicated to Indian podcasts and shows that include both their original audio shows and podcasts of third party providers.

The streaming service also operates a dedicated app for devotional music, called Aalaya ( meaning 'home').

== See also ==
- Bollywood Hungama
- JioSaavn
- Gaana
- Wynk
