= Gramam =

- Directed by: Mohan Sharma
- Written by: Mohan Sharma
- Produced by: Mohan Sharma
- Starring: Nishan; Samvrutha; Nedumudi Venu; Sukumari; Mohan Sharma; Y. G. Mahendra; Nalini; Fathima Babu
- Cinematography: Madhu Ambat
- Edited by: B. Lenin
- Release dates: 10 August 2012; (Malayalam); 3 January 2014 (Tamil)
- Running time: 131 minutes
- Country: India
- Languages: Malayalam; Tamil

Gramam (transl. Village) or Namma Gramam (transl. Our village) is an Indian bilingual film written, directed and produced by actor-producer Mohan Sharma. It was simultaneously made in Malayalam and Tamil languages under the respective titles. It stars Nishan, Samvrutha, Nedumudi Venu, Sukumari Nair, Mohan Sharma, Y. G. Mahendraa, Nalini and Fathima Babu. The film, which was well received by critics upon its screening at various film festivals, won two National Film Awards and two Kerala State Film Awards among other laurels.

Gramam is the first part of a planned trilogy on the Palakkad Brahmin community. Set between 1937 and 1947, the film is about a child widow and how she fights societal conventions. The second and third parts of the trilogy will be respectively set between 1947-1962 and 1962–1975. The film got released in Kerala on 10 August 2012. Sukumari received the National Award for Best Supporting Actress in 2010.

== Cast ==
- Mohan Sharma as Rao Bahadur Mani Swami
- Nishan as Kannan
- Samvrutha as Thulasi
- Sukumari as Amminiyamma/ Paatti
- Nedumudi Venu as Govindankutty Maashu
- Nalini as Kunju Ammaal
- Priya as Nechumu/Lakshmiyamma
- Renuka as Thankam
- Kozhikode Narayanan Nair as Panikkar Jolsyan
- Kalamandalam Radhika as Narayani
- Fathima Babu as Karthyayani
- Y. G. Mahendra as Burma Ambi Swami
- Maya Vishwanath as Bhargavi
- Kripa as Vrinda
- Aneesh G Menon as Kuttan
- Ravi Shankar
- Abhilash

== Reception ==
In regards to the Malayalam version, a critic from The Times of India rated the film 3/5 stars and wrote, "Gramam evokes wistful emotions and stays true to its purpose. It has a well-etched cast who emote with earnestness and clarity". A critic from Rediff.com rated the film 2.5/5 stars and wrote, "The overall experience of watching Gramam is like reading something that is grammatically correct but not emotionally stirring".

In regards to the Tamil version, a critic from The Times of India rated the film 3/5 stars and wrote, "The film moves at a languid pace and the scripts course is predictable to an extent but Mohan Sharma manages to keep things from turning dull. He populates this world with a few interesting characters".

== Awards ==
National Film Awards

- Won - Silver Lotus Award - Best Supporting Actress - Tamil - Sukumari
- Won - Silver Lotus Award - Best Costume Design - Indrans Jayan

Kerala State Film Awards

- Best Story - Mohan Sharma
- Best Male Playback Singer - Balamuralikrishna

Tamil Nadu State Film Awards

- Tamil Nadu State Film Award Special Prize for Best Film -Mohan Sharma
- Best Editor-B. Lenin
