= Dumhal =

Dumhal is a dance performed in the Indian territory of Jammu and Kashmir by the Watal tribe. Only the men folk of the wattal are privileged to perform this dance, on specific occasions and at set locations. Generally, this dance is performed with wearing long, colourful robes and tall, conical caps, studded with beads and shells.

The dancers sing in chorus. Drums are used to assist the music. The performers move in a ritual manner and dig a banner into the ground on set occasions. Usually, the dance begins with men dancing around this banner.
