= Yugapurushan =

2010 film by R. Sukumaran

- Yugapurushan Poster
- Directed by: R. Sukumaran
- Written by: R. Sukumaran
- Produced by: A. V. Anoop
- Starring: Thalaivasal Vijay; Mammootty; Navya Nair; Kalabhavan Mani; Siddique
- Cinematography: Ramachandra Babu
- Edited by: Sai Suresh
- Music by: Mohan Sitara
- Distributed by: A.V.A. Productions
- Release date: 5 February 2010
- Country: India
- Language: Malayalam

Yugapurushan is a 2010 Indian Malayalam-language film about the life and times of Sree Narayana Guru. The movie is directed by R. Sukumaran. It has an ensemble cast led by Thalaivasal Vijay, Mammootty and Siddique.

== Plot ==
The story revolves around the life and teachings of Sree Narayana Guru. Various events in his life like the Aruvippuram movement, Vaikom Satyagraha are detailed. The movie involves two major sub plots which highlights the relevance of the guru and his teachings as well as his love to his fellow beings one where an intercaste couple portrayed by Navya Nair and Kalabhavan Mani fights the caste establishment with the blessings of Gurudevan. Another sub plot involves a family where Jagathy Sreekumar plays a drunken abusive husband and his wife (Kalpana) who is at the receiving end seeks the Guru's help and finally with the Guru's blessing Jagathy Sreekumar returns to the path of righteousness. The movie consists of four songs penned by Kaithapram Damodaran Namboothiri and two poems by Kumaran Asan.

== Cast ==
- Thalaivasal Vijay as Sree Narayana Guru
- Mammootty as K. C. Kuttan
- Siddique as Dr. Padmanabhan Palpu
- Babu Antony as Ayyankali
- Navya Nair in a dual role as :
  - Savithri Antharjanam
  - Daughter of Savithri Antharjanam and Koran
- Devan as Madhavan
- Sai Kumar as Namboothiri
- Jishnu Raghavan as K. A. Ayyappan
- Hima Shankar as Ponni
- Kalabhavan Mani as Koran
- Arun Cherukavil as Kochu Thamburan
- Kalpana
- Jagathy Sreekumar
- Salim Kumar as Maniyan
- Thampy Antony
- Kailas Nath
- Subbalakshmi
- Shobha Mohan
- Kozhikode Sarada
- Cherthala Lalitha
- Biju Pappan
- Chali Pala
- Vijayan Peringode
- Devu Krishnan

== Production ==
The film was in the making for more than fifteen years. Sukumaran says this movie was a childhood ambition, a destiny. His devotion to Sree Narayana Guru is what promoted him to make this movie. Over 2000 hand drawn images constitute the story board.

Mohanlal was initially cast as Swami Vivekananda, a cameo role in the movie which comes in the flashback, but later on withdrew from the movie due to problems with his shooting dates.

== Soundtrack ==
The film's soundtrack contains six songs, all composed by Mohan Sithara, with lyrics by Kaithapram Damodaran Namboothiri except for the song "Prajnjanam" which was penned by Sreenarayana Guru.

#	Title	Singer(s)
1	"Oru Mathavumanyamalla"	K. J. Yesudas
2	"Kodi Kodi Adimakal"	Unni Menon
3	"Dahikkunnu Bhagini"	V. Manikandan
4	"Manjumalayilinju"	V. Manikandan
5	"Prajnjanam "	Madhu Balakrishnan
6	"Jaathi Bhetham"	K. J. Yesudas, V. Manikandan

== Release ==
Yugapurushan was released in theatres in Kerala on 5 February 2010. The film got great responses from the critics. Though the film wasn't a crowd puller during its initial release, it eventually did have poor box-office overall.
