= Atrangi Re (Original Motion Picture Soundtrack) =

- Soundtrack album cover

Soundtrack album by A. R. Rahman
- Released: 6 December 2021
- Recorded: 2019–2021
- Studios: Panchathan Record Inn and AM Studios, Chennai; A. R. Studios, Mumbai; KM Music Conservatory, Chennai; Yash Raj Studios, Mumbai
- Genre: Feature film soundtrack
- Length: 28:41
- Language: Hindi
- Label: T-Series
- Producer: A. R. Rahman

A. R. Rahman chronology
Mimi (2021)	Atrangi Re (2021)	Heropanti 2 (2022)
External audio
- Audio Jukebox on YouTube

Singles from Atrangi Re
- 1. "Chaka Chak" Released: 30 November 2021; 2. "Rait Zara Si" Released: 5 December 2021

Atrangi Re is the soundtrack to the 2021 Indian Hindi-language romantic fantasy comedy drama film of the same title, directed by Aanand L. Rai features seven songs which were composed by A. R. Rahman and lyrics written by Irshad Kamil. The album featured an assortment of singers, which includes Shreya Ghoshal, Arijit Singh, Haricharan, Daler Mehndi, Shashaa Tirupati, Dhanush, Rashid Ali and Hiral Viradia. This is the Hindi singing debut of South Indian singer Haricharan.

Rahman and Kamil had written five songs during their meeting in COVID-19 pandemic and the music was written mostly with the lead actors in mind and Rai's visualization of villages through global perspective. The album was led by two singles: "Chaka Chak" and "Rait Zara Si" released on 30 November and 5 December, respectively. The album was released by T-Series on 6 December 2021, which was preceded by a launch event in the presence of the cast and crew, and a concert led by Rahman and his musical team. The soundtrack to the Tamil dubbed version Galatta Kalyaanam, released four days later.

The album received positive reviews with praise for Rahman's compositions, and had eventually received six nominations at the 67th Filmfare Awards, with a win for Best Choreography (Vijay Ganguly), six nominations at the 22nd IIFA Awards, winning three, and twelve nominations at the 14th Mirchi Music Awards, winning three of them.

== Background ==
A. R. Rahman was announced to score music for the film in January 2020, in his second collaboration with Rai after Raanjhanaa (2013). Rahman felt that as the film travels across India, the music needed to move with the story as well as its characters. He admired Rai's vision on bringing villages to life and offer an international perspective. The music had to have varied genres, including poem, ghazal or songs that would be rhythmic, hooky and traditional, so he wanted the main chorus out of the way, and brainstorm ideas to make the music more appealing, which he did for the album.

During the COVID-19 pandemic, Rahman met Rai, screenwriter Himanshu Sharma and lyricist Irshad Kamil, discussing about the music for the film and eventually over five songs had been written for the film. Keeping in mind with the onscreen and offscreen personalities of the lead actors, Rahman curated three of the songs for them. He had conceptualised the song "Garda" for Kumar, after having a collection of his dance numbers and wanted something cool for the actor. The song "Little Little" was written with Dhanush in mind, as he used to mix English, Hindi and Tamil words in the lyrics. On curating the song, Kamil stated that:

"We had a song for Dhanush and I said 'Oh My God', it's a tough one. So, all of us were sitting one night and at around 9:30-10 we finished dinner. We were discussing what could be the song and then 'Little Little' came in. So we had a list of 15 different things and Irshad said little-little and somebody said, 'Oh, the little-little is the song actually.' When somebody's drinking, we say, I just have little-little (laughs). So, that's how the song happened."

Impressed by Khan's dance moves, Rahman wanted to create a dance number for her in the film. He asked Kamil to describe a hook word that would be the anchor of the song, for which Kamil gave the word "Chaka Chak". He further described "Rait Zara Si" as the soul of the film, which gives the entire emotion of the film in three to four minutes.

== Track listing ==
=== Hindi ===
All lyrics are written by Irshad Kamil.

Atrangi Re (Original Motion Picture Soundtrack)
No.	Title	Singer(s)	Length
1.	"Garda"	Daler Mehndi	3:44
2.	"Chaka Chak"	Shreya Ghoshal	4:31
3.	"Tere Rang"	Haricharan Seshadri, Shreya Ghoshal	4:34
4.	"Little Little"	Dhanush, Hiral Viradia	4:18
5.	"Tumhein Mohabbat Hai"	Arijit Singh	3:07
6.	"Rait Zara Si"	Arijit Singh, Shashaa Tirupati	4:51
7.	"Toofan Si Kudi"	Rashid Ali	3:36
Total length:			28:41

=== Tamil ===
The soundtrack to the Tamil-dubbed version Galatta Kalyaanam was released by T-Series on 10 December 2021. It featured songs with lyrics written by Madhan Karky, Yugabharathi, Rohini, Dhanush, Kabilan and Vivek.

Galatta Kalyanam (Original Motion Picture Soundtrack)
No.	Title	Lyrics	Singer(s)	Length
1.	"Mannaarkudi"	Madhan Karky	Mano	3:44
2.	"Chaka Chakalathi"	Yugabharathi	Shreya Ghoshal	4:29
3.	"Murali Mogha"	Rohini	Haricharan Seshadri, K. S. Chithra	4:35
4.	"Little Little"	Dhanush	Dhanush, Sharanya Srinivas	4:18
5.	"Idhudhaan En Kadhai"	Kabilan	Srinivas	2:56
6.	"Kaadhalai Solla Mudiyatha"	Kabilan	Yazin Nizar, Shashaa Tirupati	4:52
7.	"Sooraavali Ponnu"	Vivek	A. R. Ameen	3:37
Total length:				28:30

== Critical reception ==
The album received positive reviews from critics. Nair of Music Aloud gave 4 out of 5 stars and wrote "A R Rahman delivers another winner with Irshad Kamil". Monika Rawal Kukreja of Hindustan Times called the music as "pure gold" and added "Each song sets a different mood, the essence of which you want to take back home". Avinash Ramachandran of The New Indian Express commented on the film's music, saying "Although a bulk of the songs are used to hasten the narrative of the first half, it is only with the power of this music that we embark on this middling journey." Prateek Sur of Outlook wrote "AR Rahman is the king when it comes to music and he proves that once again in this film. The background score haunts you and makes you feel like you're standing right beside the characters in every moment." Daily News and Analysis writer mentioned that Rahman's "infectious soundtrack is the major highlight of the film".

== Awards ==
Award (Note: Awards, festivals and organizations are in alphabetical order.)	Date of ceremony (Note: Date is linked to the article about the awards held that year, wherever possible.)	Category	Nominee(s)	Result	Ref.
International Indian Film Academy Awards	3–4 June 2022	Best Music Director	A. R. Rahman (Note: Shared with Tanishk Bagchi, Jasleen Royal, Javed–Mohsin, B Praak, Jaani for Shershaah)	Won	
International Indian Film Academy Awards	3–4 June 2022	Best Lyricist	Irshad Kamil – ("Rait Zara Si")	Nominated	
International Indian Film Academy Awards	3–4 June 2022	Best Male Playback Singer	Arijit Singh – ("Rait Zara Si")	Nominated	
International Indian Film Academy Awards	3–4 June 2022	Best Female Playback Singer	Shreya Ghoshal – ("Chaka Chak")	Nominated	
International Indian Film Academy Awards	3–4 June 2022	Best Background Score	A. R. Rahman	Won	
International Indian Film Academy Awards	3–4 June 2022	Best Choreography	Vijay Ganguly – ("Chaka Chak")	Won	
Mirchi Music Awards	19 March 2022	Album of The Year	Atrangi Re	Nominated	
Mirchi Music Awards	19 March 2022	Listeners' Choice Album of the Year	Atrangi Re	Won	
Mirchi Music Awards	19 March 2022	Music Composer of The Year	A. R. Rahman – ("Tere Rang")	Nominated	
Mirchi Music Awards	19 March 2022	Music Composer of The Year	A. R. Rahman – ("Rait Zara Si")	Nominated	
Mirchi Music Awards	19 March 2022	Music Composer of The Year	A. R. Rahman – ("Chaka Chak")	Nominated	
Mirchi Music Awards	19 March 2022	Lyricist of The Year	Irshad Kamil – ("Chaka Chak")	Nominated	
Mirchi Music Awards	19 March 2022	Male Vocalist of The Year	Arijit Singh – ("Tumhein Mohabbat Hai")	Nominated	
Mirchi Music Awards	19 March 2022	Male Vocalist of The Year	Haricharan – ("Tere Rang")	Nominated	
Mirchi Music Awards	19 March 2022	Female Vocalist of The Year	Shreya Ghoshal – ("Chaka Chak")	Won	
Mirchi Music Awards	19 March 2022	Female Vocalist of The Year	Shreya Ghoshal – ("Tere Rang")	Nominated	
Mirchi Music Awards	19 March 2022	Song of The Year	"Chaka Chak"	Nominated	
Mirchi Music Awards	19 March 2022	Listeners' Choice Song of the Year	"Chaka Chak"	Won	
Filmfare Awards	30 August 2022	Best Music Director	A. R. Rahman	Nominated	
Filmfare Awards	30 August 2022	Best Lyricist	Irshad Kamil – ("Rait Zara Si")	Nominated	
Filmfare Awards	30 August 2022	Best Male Playback Singer	Arijit Singh – ("Rait Zara Si")	Nominated	
Filmfare Awards	30 August 2022	Best Female Playback Singer	Shreya Ghoshal – ("Chaka Chak")	Nominated	
Filmfare Awards	30 August 2022	Best Choreography	Vijay Ganguly – ("Chaka Chak")	Won	
