= Jagga Jasoos (soundtrack) =

Soundtrack album by Pritam
- Released: 14 July 2017
- Recorded: 2014–2017
- Studios: New Edge Studios, Mumbai; AIR Studios, London
- Genre: Feature film soundtrack
- Length: 54:27
- Language: Hindi
- Label: T-Series
- Producers: Siddharth Roy Kapur; Ranbir Kapoor; Anurag Basu

Pritam chronology
Tubelight (2017)	Jagga Jasoos (2017)	Jab Harry Met Sejal (2017)

Jagga Jasoos (transl. Detective Jagga) is the soundtrack album to the 2017 Hindi-language film of the same name directed by Anurag Basu, starring Ranbir Kapoor and Katrina Kaif in the lead roles. The film is produced by Pictureshuru Entertainment and Disney Pictures India. The film's soundtrack and background score is composed by Pritam in his fourth collaboration with Basu, whereas the lyrics for the songs were written by Amitabh Bhattacharya and Neelesh Misra. The film features dialogues in a sing-song rhymes format written by Samrat Chakraborty, Devesh Kapoor and Debatma Mandal along with Bhattacharya and Basu themselves.

Since the film is a musical with songs being demanded for the narrative, Pritam had conceptualised a soundtrack that consisting of 29 songs, which includes five straight numbers and the rest of the tracks were consisted of dialogues and rhymes being sung by the actors, rather than reciting the dialogues. Pritam had worked for the soundtrack for more than three years, that inspires of various cultures in the music genre and uses several instruments. The soundtrack which consisted of six tracks as straight numbers, were released by T-Series on 14 July 2017, coinciding the film's release. The remaining musical songs were expected to be released after the film's theatrical run, but were not released as planned, due to Pritam's complications with the Disney Pictures India and T-Series on releasing the album. Later, the musical tracks were published by the composer individually during mid-February 2018.

The album received positive reviews from critics, praising the compositions, lyrics and choice of singers, eventually went on to become one of the best musical soundtracks of the 2017 (and the decade). Film critics praised Basu and Pritam on the integration of the songs and the writing of dialogues in musical rather than storytelling format. The tracks "Ullu Ka Pattha" and "Galti Se Mistake" were chart-busters, and appreciated for the tune, lyrics and the song choreography. In addition to the critical and audience response, the album won numerous accolades, including received five Bollywood Film Journalists, four Filmfare, two International Indian Film Academy and Screen Awards, a Mirchi Music and Zee Cine Award each.

== Background ==
The soundtrack was composed by Pritam in his fourth collaboration with Anurag Basu after Gangster (2006), Life in a... Metro (2007) and Barfi! (2012). Besides composing the soundtrack, Pritam also worked on the film's score. The lyrics for the songs were written by Amitabh Bhattacharya and Neelesh Misra. The dialogues were written by Bhattacharya, Basu, Samrat Chakraborty, Devesh Kapoor and Debatma Mandal in musical rhymes. Arijit Singh, Nikhita Gandhi, Amit Mishra, Tushar Joshi, Mohan Kannan, Geet Sagar, June Banerjee, Antara Mitra, Ashwin M. Prabhu, Aroh Mehta, Ananya Wadkar, Vivianne Pocha and Shubhanshu Kesharwani. The songs were choreographed by Shiamak Davar, Vijay Ganguly and Ruel Dausan Varandani provided the vocals.

According to Pritam, Jagga Jasoos is considered to be his "most difficult film he had worked in his career". The film went on production for more than three years, beginning since 2014 and as was the album, which resulted the composer to reject nearly 50 films since mid-2013. It was a musical film and Basu wanted to have more than 20 songs in the soundtrack, with all tracks being consisted of lip-synced songs. Unlike the album for Barfi! was being finalised at the last minute before the release, the soundtrack was conceptualised during the film's production. The tracks consisted of monologues which carry forward the conversation and enhance the narrative. Ranbir Kapoor was reported to sing most of his dialogues instead of saying them in the conventional way. Speaking to an interview with The Indian Express, Kapoor had stated this:

"To be honest, it's my disadvantage as an actor. It is my shortcoming. I have tried singing, I cannot sing, however there are a few times I have sung in this film, because there are a lot of spoken words and melody was required [...] It is accepted that actors do not sing songs in our industry. But Jagga Jasoos is a true musical, and the thing is that, my character, stammers and it is easier to sing than to talk, when you sing you don't stammer. It is a very new concept in India, so I don't know if it will be accepted in India."

== Recording and production ==
By October 2014, Pritam started working on two romantic tracks pictured between the leads, and by late-December 2014, he managed to compose seven tracks for the album. In February 2017, it was reported that the film will have 29 songs being incorporated as a part of the narrative. The composer further stated that the tracks articulately expresses Kapoor's stuttering character, and he also cited the Hollywood musical La La Land (2016) as an example to show how songs seem very organic when embedded in the narrative intelligently. He used an instrumental quotient for one of the tracks which includes of trumpet, electronic guitar, piano, acoustic guitar, keyboard and bass. The soundtrack is highly influenced from folk music in various cultures.

Pritam took inspiration from Assamese Bihu folk music for the track "Galti Se Mistake". Dhrubajyoti Phukan who co-produced the song, along with Sunny M. R. and Rohan Chauhan had stated that: "There is always a crescendo at the end of the song in Assamese Bihu. It consists of a multiple layer crescendo which varies from slightly loud to faster and louder feel. The same tone has been kept in this song [...] There is a rift of Pipa (instrument), which has been modified to merge in the original composition song and plus we have used sample groups to make it sound like electronic Bihu and not raw Bihu. The Pepa tune has been chopped in such a way that it has to be matched to typical Assamese phrases like mix of six to eight groups playing some phrases in 4-4. It's a unique colour of Assamese Bihu which has been very nicely used in this hook part. There is hardly any music in the world where this kind of technique has been used and it sounds great."

Tushar Joshi sang for two of the tracks in the album, apart from acting as a playback singer to Kapoor's character. He eventually joined Pritam's musical team in August 2016, when the film's production was underway. He stated this in an interview with News18 saying: "I was totally clueless as even the film's production hadn't reached the finishing stage. Initially, I just observed and then afterwards, I understood the format. When we were trying to find Ranbir's voice, I had no idea that it'll be me [...] But because I was better versed with the script, I could do it well when the time came." The dubbing process for the songs took place within one month.

== Release ==
On 5 June 2017, the first track from the album, "Ullu Ka Pattha" was released as a single. Sung by Arijit Singh and Nikhita Gandhi, the track was choreographed by Shiamak Davar, where the quirky and robotic dance movement between Kapoor and Kaif received praise. The second track "Galti Se Mistake" highlights the carefree days of a students' life. It was released on 19 June 2017. Despite the track being positively received for the quirky, fun-filled lyrics, the picturization and Kapoor's choreography, the composer Pritam was criticised for alleged plagiarism as the song was inspired from Mexican based pop trio 3Ball MTY's track "Inténtalo". However, the music producers Sunny M. R., Dhrubajyoti Phukan and Rohan Chauhan declined the claims. The third track "Jhumritalaiyya" was released on 23 June 2017, exploring the relationship between the characters of Kapoor and Kaif. On 30 June, the fourth track "Phir Wahi" was released, which portrays Kapoor's childhood and the relationship with his father. The fifth track "Musafir" was released on 10 July 2017.

Three days before the release, Pritam had announced that the soundtrack album will have 5 straight songs. The rest of the album will have 25 songs which are a part of the film's story told in a sing song manner and releasing those tracks would reveal the complete content of the film. As a result, the team planned to release the soundtrack only after the film's release, as Pritam said that: "Once people have watched the film, they can understand the context of the songs without taking away from the story of the film. After the release of the movie, the audience can witness the visuals of this musical." The five-song soundtrack album was released on 14 July 2017, which coincided with the film's release.

== Reception ==
In the music review for Bollywood Hungama, Joginder Tuteja gave 3.5 stars to the soundtrack stating it as "quite impressive and actually deserved to cover a much longer distance than it would eventually do". Apoorva Nijhara, in the review for Pinkvilla wrote: "As Jagga Jasoos is a musical so we don't get to hear all the songs but the ones we got to listen truly justify the madness of the trailer. Pritam has done a great job with the selection of the music and singers like Arijit Singh, Tushar Joshi and Amit Mishra." News18-based critic Shanthanu David said that "Pritam's tunes might urges you to forget the troubles beset due to the filming and release". Vipin Nair of Music Aloud gave 4.5 stars (out of 5) calling it as "the most incredible work of music that composer Pritam has produced to date". Karthik Srinivasan's review for Milliblog summarised "Pritam showcases a tremendously enjoyable range over the 5-song Jagga Jasoos soundtrack". Nihit Bhave of The Times of India, gave 3.5 stars for the film's music concluding "Pritam's foot tapping music and a story that, while told through an inconvenient lyrical narration, is one worth experiencing".

It was listed in several year-enders published by A Humming Heart, Deccan Music and Milliblog, claiming it as the "Best Bollywood Album of 2017". The tracks "Ullu Ka Pattha" and "Jhumritalaiyya" were listed in 'Top Hindi Songs of 2017' by Milliblog and Music Aloud. "Ullu Ka Pattha" was listed as one of the "Top 15 Bollywood Songs Of 2017" by Film Companion and The Indian Express. In Sukanya Verma's article about "Best Bollywood Songs of 2017" to Rediff.com listed "Khaana Khaake" as one of the tracks. The album was featured in decade-end lists, which includes Devesh Sharma's article for Filmfare, published on World Music Day (21 June 2021), Akshay Manwani's review for Firstpost, Sankhayan Ghosh's review for Film Companion, and Devarsi Ghosh's list for Scroll.in. Tatsam Mukherjee's article for Huffington Post about "The Top 20 Bollywood Albums Since 2000" listed the album.

== Track listing ==
Jagga Jasoos (Original Motion Picture Soundtrack)
No.	Title	Lyrics	Singer(s)	Length
1.	"Ullu Ka Pattha"	Amitabh Bhattacharya	Arijit Singh, Nikhita Gandhi, Vivianne Pocha	3:31
2.	"Galti Se Mistake"	Amitabh Bhattacharya	Amit Mishra, Arijit Singh, Shubhanshu Kesharwani	3:23
3.	"Jhumritalaiyya"	Neelesh Misra	Arijit Singh, Mohan Kanan	3:59
4.	"Phir Wahi"	Amitabh Bhattacharya	Arijit Singh	4:13
5.	"Musafir"	Amitabh Bhattacharya	Tushar Joshi	4:42
6.	"Khaana Khaake"	Amitabh Bhattacharya	Pritam, Amitabh Bhattacharya, Tushar Joshi, Geet Sagar, June Banerjee, Antara Mitra, Amit Mishra, Ashwin Kulkarni, Aaroh Velanker, Ananya Wadkar, Sunny M.R.	3:19
7.	""Alvida""	Strings	Hareem Farooq, Strings, Aima Baig, Sahir Ali Bagga, and Sabri Brothers	9:00
Total length:				23:07

== Unreleased compositions ==
By December 2017, it has been reported that Pritam were in talks with the production company and music label, Disney Pictures India and T-Series to release the entire soundtrack, and in the process, he released the first of the unreleased musical numbers on 9 February 2018. The track was titled "Aflatoon", sung by Nikhita Gandhi is a mellow-based guitar number, and was licensed and published through the composer's YouTube channel. Several of the tracks were later released by Pritam himself. But the album was not released in entirety, due to the issues regarding with Pritam and Disney Pictures India. In March 2021, Pritam had stated about the complications on the album's release, as he stated: "I was so keen to bring the musicals of Jagga Jasoos to the public domain, but Disney did not agree. There were so many legal issues and such red-tapism that it left me frustrated. This remains as a big regret in my heart." As of late-2020, only 15 tracks were published through the composer's YouTube channel.

Jagga Jasoos (Musicals) – Unreleased Album
No.	Title	Lyrics	Singer(s)	Length
1.	"Aflatoon"	Samrat Chakraborty	Nikhita Gandhi	2:09
2.	"Humko Usse Kya"	Anurag Basu, Samrat Chakraborty, Amitabh Bhattacharya	Neeti Mohan, Chorus	1:14
3.	"Badlucky"	Amitabh Bhattacharya, Samrat Chakraborty	Tushar Joshi	3:45
4.	"Bas Do Din Aur"	Amitabh Bhattacharya, Samrat Chakraborty	Tushar Joshi	1:57
5.	"Chocolaty Chunnu"	Amitabh Bhattacharya	Varenyam Pandya, Purvash Chakraborty, Arnab Chakrabarty	3:16
6.	"Hotel Agapastala"	Samrat Chakraborty	Neeti Mohan, Tushar Joshi, Ashwin Kulkarni, Simo Lagnawi	1:48
7.	"Badluck Bagchi"	Amitabh Bhattacharya	Nikhita Gandhi	1:08
8.	"World Of Jagga"	Samrat Chakraborty	Neeti Mohan, Chorus	1:17
9.	"Question Mark"	Samrat Chakraborty	Tushar Joshi, Neeti Mohan	1:51
10.	"Sab Jhooth"	Samrat Chakraborty	Varenyam Pandya, Saswata Chatterjee	1:55
11.	"Aaya Jagga"	Amitabh Bhattacharya	Neeti Mohan, Antara Mitra, Jonita Gandhi, Harjot Kaur, Risha Rathore, Himani Kapoor, June Banerjee, Meenal Bale, Arunita Kanjilal, Arnab Chakraborty	2:04
12.	"Red Circle"	Amitabh Bhattacharya	Nikhita Gandhi	0:43
13.	"News Musical"	Samrat Chakraborty	Nikhil Paul George, Antara Mitra, Ashwin Kulkarni, Tushar Joshi, Himanshu Shirlekar, Aaroh Velanker, Abhishek Sarangi, Amit Sawant, Kaushik Das, Akashdeep Sengupta, Subhadeep Das, Supriti Banerjee	2:05
14.	"Tukka Laga"	Anurag Basu, Samrat Chakraborty	Tushar Joshi, Saurabh Shukla, Meiyang Chang and Suzanne D'Mello	4:06
15.	"Hotel Beatboxing"	Anurag Basu, Debatma Mandal	Tushar Joshi, Nagesh Reddy	1:52
Total length:				31:19

== Awards and nominations ==
Award (Note: Awards, festivals and organisations are in alphabetical order.)	Date of ceremony (Note: Date is linked to the article about the awards held that year, wherever possible.)	Category	Nominee(s)	Result	Ref.
Bollywood Film Journalists Awards	6 March 2018	Best Music Director	Pritam	Won	
Bollywood Film Journalists Awards	6 March 2018	Best Background Score	Pritam	Won	
Bollywood Film Journalists Awards	6 March 2018	Best Sound Effects	Abhishek Nair, Shijin Melvin Hutton	Won	
Bollywood Film Journalists Awards	6 March 2018	Best Lyrics	Amitabh Bhattacharya (for the song "Khaana Khaake")	Won	
Bollywood Film Journalists Awards	6 March 2018	Best Choreography	Vijay Ganguly, Ruel Dausan Vrindani (for the song "Galti Se Mistake")	Won	
Filmfare Awards	20 January 2018	Best Music Director	Pritam	Won	
Filmfare Awards	20 January 2018	Best Background Score	Pritam	Won	
Filmfare Awards	20 January 2018	Best Lyricist	Amitabh Bhattacharya (for the song "Galti Se Mistake")	Won	
Filmfare Awards	20 January 2018	Best Lyricist	Amitabh Bhattacharya (for the song "Ullu Ka Pattha")	Nominated	
Filmfare Awards	20 January 2018	Best Choreography	Shiamak Davar (for the song "Ullu Ka Pattha")	Nominated	
Filmfare Awards	20 January 2018	Best Choreography	Vijay Ganguly (for the song "Khaana Khaake")	Nominated	
Filmfare Awards	20 January 2018	Best Choreography	Vijay Ganguly, Ruel Dausan Vrindani (for the song "Galti Se Mistake")	Won	
International Indian Film Academy Awards	22–24 June 2018	Best Music Director	Pritam	Nominated	
International Indian Film Academy Awards	22–24 June 2018	Best Background Score	Pritam	Won	
International Indian Film Academy Awards	22–24 June 2018	Best Choreography	Vijay Ganguly, Ruel Dausan Vrindani (for the song "Galti Se Mistake")	Won	
Mirchi Music Awards	28 January 2018	Album of The Year	Pritam, Amitabh Bhattacharya, Neelesh Misra	Nominated	
Mirchi Music Awards	28 January 2018	Upcoming Male Vocalist of The Year	Tushar Joshi (for the song "Musafir")	Nominated	
Mirchi Music Awards	28 January 2018	Best Song Producer	Dhrubajyoti Phukan, Sunny M.R. (for the song "Ullu Ka Pattha")	Nominated	
Mirchi Music Awards	28 January 2018	Best Background Score	Pritam	Nominated	
Mirchi Music Awards	28 January 2018	Listeners' Choice Album of the Year	Pritam, Amitabh Bhattacharya, Neelesh Misra	Won	
Screen Awards	2 December 2017	Best Choreography	Vijay Ganguly, Ruel Dausan Vrindani (for the song "Galti Se Mistake")	Nominated	
Screen Awards	2 December 2017	Best Choreography	Shiamak Davar (for the song "Ullu Ka Pattha")	Won	
Screen Awards	2 December 2017	Best Male Playback Singer	Arijit Singh (for the song "Galti Se Mistake")	Won	
Screen Awards	2 December 2017	Best Music	Pritam	Nominated	
Zee Cine Awards	30 December 2017	Best Choreography	Vijay Ganguly, Ruel Dausan Vrindani (for the song "Galti Se Mistake")	Won	
Zee Cine Awards	30 December 2017	Best Choreography	Shiamak Davar (for the song "Ullu Ka Pattha")	Nominated	
Zee Cine Awards	30 December 2017	Best Music	Pritam	Nominated	
Zee Cine Awards	30 December 2017	Song of the Year	"Galti Se Mistake"	Nominated	
