= Humko Aaj Kal Hai Intezaar =

Humko Aaj Kaal Hai Intezaar is a chartbuster Hindi dance song from the film Sailaab (1990), sung by Anupama Deshpande, composed by Bappi Lahiri, written by Javed Akhtar, lip-synched by actress Madhuri Dixit and choreographed by Saroj Khan. Saroj Khan won Filmfare Award for Best Choreographer for the song.

== Picturisation ==
Dixit’s character is rescued from a fishnet and revived by a village healer, who unleashes her dancing abilities in the process. The singer has one common line in every stanza, "Humko Aaj Kal Hai Intezaar, Koi Aaye Leke Pyaar". The verse is followed by a chorus of some fishermen and their wives. Madhuri's costume and dance are inspired by traditional Marathi women and the dance form Lavni. Saroj Khan won a Filmfare award for her choreography.

== Popularity ==
The song has been described by an online portal as the best aspect of Sailaab film. On 15 May 2017, it was selected as one of the "Top 15 Madhuri Dixit songs of all time", by a leading Indian newspaper, The Hindustan Times on her 50th birthday. Like other popular 1990s dance numbers, this song too was remixed in the early 2000s. Popular television actress Drashti Dhami appeared on the remix version of the song. In 2018, as revealed in social medias, Richa Chadha's look in film 3 Storeys closely resembles the look of Madhuri Dixit in the song "Humko Aaj Kal Hai".

== Awards and nominations ==
Year	Award	Category	Recipient	Result
1991	Filmfare Awards	Filmfare Award for Best Choreography	Saroj Khan	Won
