= Rupali Ganguly =

Indian actress (born 1977)

- Ganguly in 2026
- Born: 5 April 1977 (age 49); Bombay, Maharashtra, India
- Occupations: Actress; politician
- Years active: 1985–present
- Known for: Sarabhai vs Sarabhai; Anupamaa
- Political party: Bharatiya Janata Party (2024–present)
- Spouse: Ashwin K Verma (m. 2013)
- Children: 1
- Parents: Anil Ganguly (father); Rajni Ganguly (mother)
- Relatives: Vijay Ganguly (brother)
- Awards: Full list

Rupali Ganguly (Bengali pronunciation: [rupali gaŋguli]; born 5 April 1977) is an Indian actress who primarily works in Hindi television One of the highest-paid television actresses in India, Ganguly is best known for portraying Monisha Singh Sarabhai in the sitcom Sarabhai vs Sarabhai (2004–2006) and Anupamaa Joshi in the drama Anupamaa (2020–present). She is a recipient of several accolades including two ITA Awards and four Indian Telly Awards.

Born to Anil Ganguly, Ganguly made her acting debut at the age of seven, in her father's directorial venture Saaheb (1985). She featured opposite Tapas Paul in her father's Bengali film Balidan (1990) which was a massive commercial success. Despite the success of the film, she no longer appear in Bengali cinema. Ganguly later had her breakthrough with her portrayal of Dr. Simran Chopra in the medical drama series Sanjivani: A Medical Boon (2003–2005). In 2006, she participated in Bigg Boss 1. Ganguly continued to appear in numerous successful television series, portraying Sujata in Ek Packet Umeed (2008) and Pinky Khanna Ahuja in Parvarrish – Kuchh Khattee Kuchh Meethi (2011–2013), following which she took a sabbatical from acting for seven years, and returned with Anupamaa.

== Early life and family ==
Ganguly was born on 5 April 1977 in Bombay, Maharashtra into a Bengali Hindu family. Ganguly's father, Anil Ganguly, was a director and screenwriter and her brother Vijay Ganguly is a choreographer. She studied hotel management and theatre.

== Career ==
Ganguly made her acting debut at the age of seven with her father's film Saaheb in 1985 in her childhood. She appeared opposite Tapas Paul in Balidan (1990) a Bengali Film, directed by her father. The film became a massive commercial success. Despite the success of the film, Ganguly failed to build a career in Bengali cinema. She made her television debut in Sukanya in 2000, and has also appeared in Sanjivani and Bhabhi.

Ganguly received widespread recognition and critical acclaim for her portrayal of Monisha Sarabhai, a middle-class young woman married in a high society, Cuffe Parade-living socialite family in the cult sitcom Sarabhai vs Sarabhai from 2004 to 2006. Later in November 2006, Ganguly participated in the reality show Bigg Boss 1. She got evicted in its tenth week.

She is also a part of many Hindi theatre plays in her career, Some of her plays are Oye Ki Girl Hain, Selfie, "All the very best", and Patte Khul Gaye. In 2009, she participated in Colors TV's stunt based reality show, Fear Factor: Khatron Ke Khiladi 2. She also gave voice over in an animation film Dashavatar in 2008. In 2000, she established an advertising agency in Mumbai.

Since 2020, she is portraying the titular character in StarPlus's Anupamaa. Ganguly made her digital debut in 2022 with her ongoing show Anupamaa's prequel web series named Anupama: Namaste America which premiered on Disney+ Hotstar in 2022.

Rupali Ganguly went viral for her intense dialogue “ghuma ghumake marungi” in the TV show Anupamaa. Fans compared her delivery to Sunny Deol, dubbing her “Sunny Deol Pro Max”, and widely shared clips on social media, highlighting her impactful screen presence.

== Political career ==
Ganguly started her political career in 2024, by joining Bharatiya Janta Party at the party headquarters in Delhi, on 1 May 2024. On joining BJP, she said, "The one personality that attracts everyone towards BJP is PM Narendra Modi. When I see this 'Mahayagya' of development, I feel that I should also take part in this."

== In the media ==
A report from Times Of India marked her as the highest earning Indian television actor in 2023. Ganguly is known for portraying powerful roles on-screen. In the Eastern Eye's "Top 50 Asian Stars" list, she was placed 29th in 2022 and 16th in 2024. In 2023, Ganguly featured in an ad for the Vocal for Local campaign, along with her 'Anupamaa co-actor Gaurav Khanna. In 2023, she ranked 5th in Times Now "Popular Television Actresses" list.

== Controversies ==
In November 2024, Rupali filed a defamation lawsuit for ₹50 crore against her stepdaughter Esha Verma on purported allegations. Esha Verma posted a video on her social media account, alleging that her father, Ashwin K Verma, harassed her mother. After the defamation suit was filed, Esha deleted the post from her social media handles.

In 2026, Ganguly sparked widespread backlash for tweeting that she wished the "Prime Minister of India Narendra Modi was a dictator".

== Personal life ==
Ganguly married businessman Ashwin K. Verma on 6 February 2013. The couple has a son born 25 August 2013.

== Filmography ==
=== Films ===
- All films are in Hindi unless otherwise noted.

| Year | Title | Role | Notes | Ref. |
|---|---|---|---|---|
| 1985 | Saaheb | Uncredited | | |
| 1987 | Mera Yaar Mera Dushman | Uncredited | | |
| 1990 | Balidan | | Bengali film | |
| 1996 | Angaara | Gulabi | | |
| 1997 | Do Ankhen Barah Hath | Neeta Dayaram | | |
| 2006 | Premante Inte | Lizi | Telugu film | |
| 2008 | Dashavatar | Apsara | Voice role | |
| 2008 | Eti | Shreya | Bengali film | |
| 2011 | Satrangee Parachute | Sumitra C. Sharma | | |

=== Television ===
| Year | Title | Role | Notes | Ref. |
|---|---|---|---|---|
| 2000 | Dil Hai Ki Manta Nahi | Priya / Anjali | double role | |
| 2000–2001 | Sukanya | Sukanya | Bengali-language series | |
| 2002 | Suraag – The Clue | Shweta | | |
| 2003–2004 | Zindagi...Teri Meri Kahani | Riya | main role | |
| 2003–2005 | Sanjivani: A Medical Boon | Dr. Simran Chopra | main role | |
| 2004 | Bhabhi | Roshni Khanna | | |
| 2004–2006 | Sarabhai vs Sarabhai | Manisha "Monisha" Singh Sarabhai | main role | |
| 2005–2007 | Kahaani Ghar Ghar Kii | Gayatri Agarwal | | |
| 2005 | Kkavyanjali | Mona Mittal | | |
| 2005 | CID: Special Bureau | Meera | | |
| 2006 | Yes Boss | Sharmili | | |
| 2006–2007 | Bigg Boss 1 | Contestant | 6th place | |
| 2007 | Sapna Babul Ka... Bidaai | Roopa | | |
| 2008 | Ek Packet Umeed | Sujata Dharamraj | | |
| 2008 | Zara Nachke Dikha | Contestant | season 1 | |
| 2009 | Aapki Antara | Anuradha Rai | | |
| 2009 | Fear Factor: Khatron Ke Khiladi 2 | Contestant | 12th place | |
| 2010 | Kitchen Champion 2 | Contestant | | |
| 2010 | Meethi Choori No 1 | Contestant | | |
| 2010 | Baa Bahoo Aur Baby | Rekha Sharma | | |
| 2011 | Adaalat | Public Prosecutor Rohini Malik | | |
| 2011 | Mujhe Meri Family Se Bachao | Sweetie Avasthi | | |
| 2011–2013 | Parvarrish – Kuchh Khattee Kuchh Meethi | Pinky Kaur Khanna Ahuja | Main role | |
| 2013 | Bioscope | Host | | |
| 2017 | Sarabhai vs Sarabhai: Take 2 | Manisha "Monisha" Singh Sarabhai | | |
| 2020–present | Anupamaa | Anupamaa "Anu" Joshi | Main role | |
| 2022 | Ravivaar With Star Parivaar | Anupamaa "Anu" Joshi | | |
| 2022 | Anupama: Namaste America | Anupamaa "Anu" Joshi | | |

== Awards and nominations ==
For Anupamaa, Ganguly has won two ITA Award, among ten nominations.

== See also ==
- List of Indian television actresses
- List of Hindi television actresses
