= Jab Harry Met Sejal (soundtrack) =

Soundtrack album by Pritam
- Released: 3 August 2017
- Recorded: 2016–2017
- Genre: Feature film soundtrack
- Length: 57:11
- Language: Hindi
- Label: Sony Music India
- Producer: Pritam

Pritam chronology
Jagga Jasoos (2017)	Jab Harry Met Sejal (2017)	Kalank (2019)

Singles from Jab Harry Met Sejal
- 1. "Radha" Released: 21 June 2017; 2. "Beech Beech Mein" Released: 1 July 2017; 3. "Safar" Released: 10 July 2017; 4. "Butterfly" Released: 19 July 2017; 5. "Hawayein" Released: 26 July 2017; 6. "Phurrr" Released: 3 August 2017

Jab Harry Met Sejal is the soundtrack to the 2017 film of the same name directed by Imtiaz Ali and stars Anushka Sharma and Shah Rukh Khan. The film's music is composed by Pritam and lyrics were written by Irshad Kamil. The soundtrack accompanied 13 songs which was released by Sony Music India on 3 August 2017.

== Background and release ==
Jab Harry Met Sejal is Pritam's third collaboration with Ali after Jab We Met (2007) and Love Aaj Kal (2009). The music rights for the film were acquired by Sony Music India for ₹15 crore (US$1.6 million).

The first song from the soundtrack "Radha" was released as a single on 21 June 2017, coincided with World Music Day; the track was performed by Shahid Mallya and Sunidhi Chauhan. Upon its release, the track crossed 6 million views within less than 24 hours of its release. Owing to its success, the song was released in multiple languages for promotional purposes in Tamil ("Vandhaale Radha"), Telugu ("Nene Nee Radha"), Bengali ("Ami Holam Tomar Radha") and Arabic ("Ami Holam Tomar Radha"). The Tamil and Telugu versions were sung by Shashaa Tirupati, while the Bengali and Arabic versions were respectively sung by Pragya Dasgupta and Shaimaa ElShayeb. The second song "Beech Beech Main" is a party number, featuring Khan and Sharma. Sung by Arijit Singh, Shalmali Kholgade and Shefali Alvares, the song was released on 1 July 2017.

The third song "Safar" performed by Singh was released on 10 July 2017. The music video was preceded with an interaction between Kamil, Khan and Pritam regarding the song's curation and composition, which Scroll.in described it as an innovative way to promote the film. The fourth song "Butterfly", sung by Dev Negi, Chauhan, Aman Trikha and Nooran Sisters was released on 19 July 2017. The film version of the song was mixed with a tumbi track, that was absent in the final mastering which was sent to the music platforms. The fourth song "Hawayein" performed by Singh was released on 26 July 2017. It became the most streamed song with its music video being viewed 9.8 million times within 24 hours on YouTube. Pritam said that he did not expect the song to be a huge success, while Sanujeet Bhujabal, marketing director at Sony Music India described it as a "never-heard-before phenomenon".

On 23 July 2017, Khan announced on Twitter that American DJ Diplo had composed a song "Phurrr" with Pritam. A mix of bhangra and electronic music, the song was sung by Diplo, Mohit Chauhan and Tushar Joshi and was released on 3 August. The film version was solely composed by Pritam, without Diplo's involvement, which was included in the soundtrack. The 13-track album was released on 30 July 2017.

Post the film's release, on 8 August 2017, Pritam announced that he would take a one-year sabbatical, without signing new projects until the release of Kalank (2019).

== Reception ==
Manish Gaekwad of Film Companion wrote "The album piles on with so many tracks [...] and sometimes that is precisely why one cannot take it anymore." Joginder Tuteja of Bollywood Hungama rated 4 out of 5 saying "The music of Jab Harry Met Sejal is already popular and it is all set to enjoy a good run in weeks and months to come as well." Vipin Nair of Music Aloud wrote "Composing for Imtiaz Ali after a gap of eight years, Pritam returns with a vengeance, giving him the team’s biggest and best soundtrack yet in Jab Harry Met Sejal." Debarati S Sen of The Times of India commented that they have made an "enjoyable album", "which captures the usual genres that characterises a typical Bollywood film, well enough". Pradeep Menon of Firstpost called "Safar" as "one of Pritam’s most captivating songs yet". Milliblog wrote "Close on the heels of the magnificent Jagga Jasoos, Pritam ups the ante in Jab Harry Met Sejal, in what seems to be his best year yet!" Suanshu Khurana of The Indian Express called it as "a mix of brilliant and some completely ordinary tracks". Shantanu David of News18 stated that the album has "both hits and misses".

== Track listing ==
Jab Harry Met Sejal (Original Motion Picture Soundtrack)
No.	Title	Singer(s)	Length
1.	"Radha"	Sunidhi Chauhan, Shahid Mallya	5:02
2.	"Beech Beech Mein"	Arijit Singh, Shalmali Kholgade, Shefali Alvares	3:26
3.	"Safar"	Arijit Singh	6:05
4.	"Butterfly"	Dev Negi, Sunidhi Chauhan, Aman Trikha, Nooran Sisters	3:57
5.	"Hawayein"	Arijit Singh	4:50
6.	"Parinda"	Pardeep Singh Sran	3:12
7.	"Ghar"	Nikhita Gandhi, Mohit Chauhan	3:41
8.	"Yaadon Mein"	Jonita Gandhi, Mohammed Irfan, Cuca Roseta, Arjun Chandy	5:35
9.	"Raula"	Diljit Dosanjh, Neeti Mohan	4:16
10.	"Jee Ve Sohaneya"	Nooran Sisters	4:10
11.	"Phurrr" (Film Version)	Mohit Chauhan, Tushar Joshi	3:25
12.	"Hawayein" (Film Version)	Arijit Singh	5:07
13.	"Parinda" (Searching)	Tochi Raina, Nikhil D'Souza	4:16
Total length:			57:11

Jab Harry Met Sejal (Original Motion Picture Soundtrack)
No.	Title	Singer(s)	Length
14.	"Phurrr" (Single Version)	Diplo, Mohit Chauhan, Tushar Joshi	3:24
Total length:			60:35

== Accolades ==
Award	Date of ceremony	Category	Recipient	Awards	Ref.
Asian Customer Engagement Forum and Awards	2 October 2017	Capability Award – Best Use of Social Media for Jab Harry Met Sejal	Red Chillies Entertainment — "Safar"	Won	
Filmfare Awards	20 January 2018	Best Music Director	Pritam	Nominated	
Filmfare Awards	20 January 2018	Best Female Playback Singer	Nikhita Gandhi — "Ghar"	Nominated	
International Indian Film Academy Awards	22–24 June 2018	Best Playback Singer Male	Arijit Singh — "Hawayein"	Won	
Mirchi Music Awards	28 January 2018	Song of The Year	"Hawayein"	Won	
Mirchi Music Awards	28 January 2018	Album of The Year	Jab Harry Met Sejal	Won	
Mirchi Music Awards	28 January 2018	Male Vocalist of The Year	Arijit Singh — "Hawayein"	Won	
Mirchi Music Awards	28 January 2018	Music Composer of The Year	Pritam — "Hawayein"	Won	
Mirchi Music Awards	28 January 2018	Lyricist of The Year	Irshad Kamil — "Hawayein"	Won	
Mirchi Music Awards	28 January 2018	Lyricist of The Year	Irshad Kamil — "Safar"	Nominated	
Mirchi Music Awards	28 January 2018	Female Vocalist of The Year	Nikhita Gandhi — "Ghar"	Nominated	
Mirchi Music Awards	28 January 2018	Best Song Producer (Programming & Arranging)	Tanuj Tiku, Dj Phukan & Sunny M.R. — "Ghar"	Nominated	
Mirchi Music Awards	28 January 2018	Best Background Score	Hitesh Sonik	Nominated	
Screen Awards	2 December 2017	Best Music	Pritam	Nominated	
Screen Awards	2 December 2017	Best Playback Singer (Male)	Arijit Singh — "Hawayein"	Nominated	
Zee Cine Awards	30 December 2017	Best Music Director	Pritam	Nominated	
Zee Cine Awards	30 December 2017	Best Lyricist	Irshad Kamil — "Hawayein"	Nominated	
Zee Cine Awards	30 December 2017	Best Playback Singer (Male)	Arijit Singh — "Hawayein"	Nominated	
Zee Cine Awards	30 December 2017	Best Playback Singer (Female)	Sunidhi Chauhan — "Radha"	Nominated	
