= Vijay Ganguly =

Indian choreographer (born 1980)

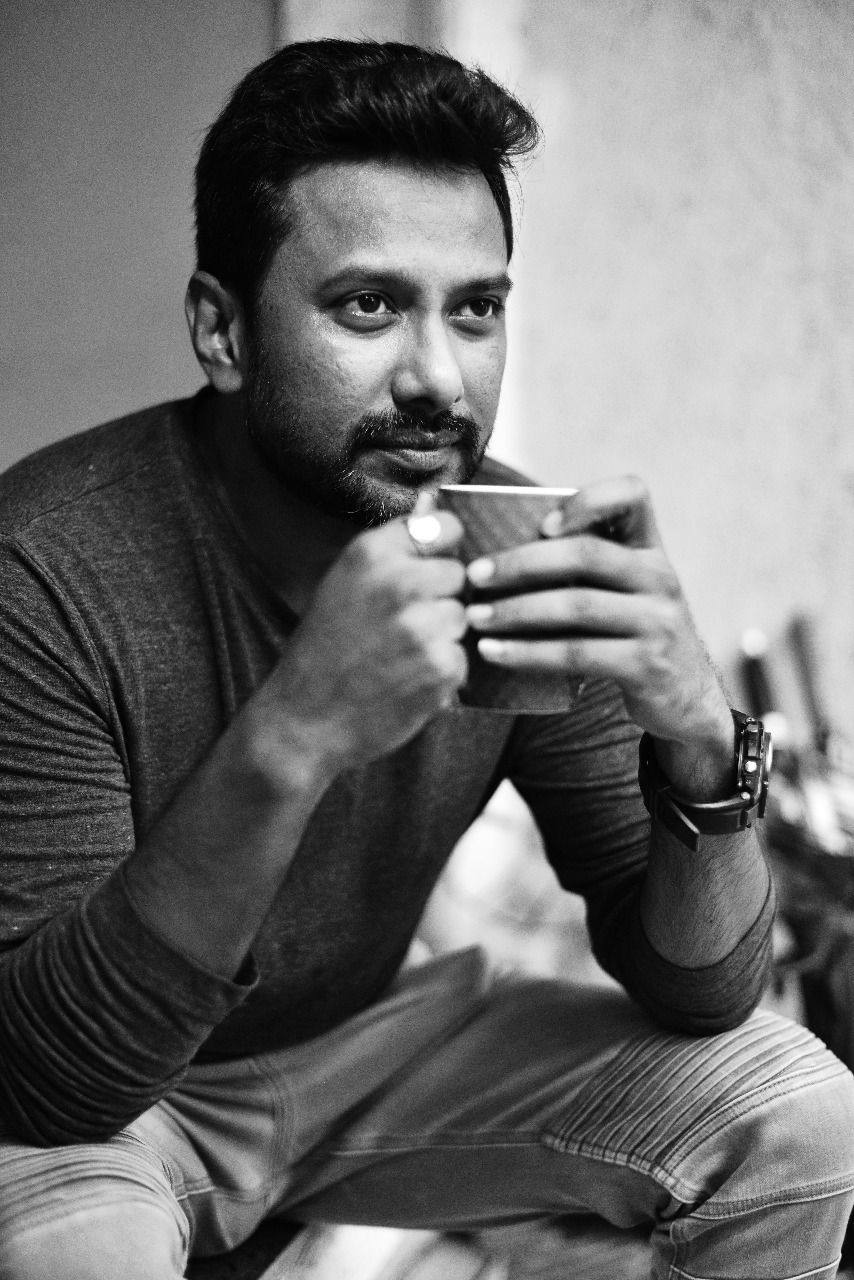
- Born: Vijay Anil Ganguly; 1980 (age 45–46); Bombay, Maharashtra, India
- Occupation: Choreographer
- Known for: Jagga Jasoos, Andhadhun, Love Aaj Kal, Tumhari Sulu, Stree, Dhurandhar, Dhurandhar The Revenge
- Parent(s): Anil Ganguly (father); Rajni Ganguly (mother)
- Relatives: Rupali Ganguly (sister)

Vijay Ganguly (born 1980) is an Indian choreographer known for Jagga Jasoos (2017), Andhadhun (2018), Stree (2018) and Love Aaj Kal (2020). He won the 2018 Filmfare Award for Best Choreography for the song "Galti Se Mistake" in Jagga Jasoos, for which he also won the 2018 IIFA for Best Choreography and 2017 Zee Cine Awards for Best Choreography.

== Biography ==
Vijay Ganguly was born in 1980 to his father Anil Ganguly, a film director. He is a younger brother of actress Rupali Ganguly.

== Career ==
Vijay Ganguly acted in a few films as child artist including Saaheb (1985), Sadak Chhap (1987), and Dushman Devta (1991). He started his career as an assistant choreographer in 2005 with the film Bunty Aur Babli, and later worked as assistant choreographer in films including Taare Zameen Par (2007), Yuvvraaj (2008), and Mission: Impossible – Ghost Protocol (2011). He began his career independently as choreographer in 2013. He has choreographed many songs including "Nachenge Saari Raat" from Junooniyat (2016), "Mere Rashke Qamar" from Baadshaho (2017), and the album Tumhari Sulu (2017). He rose to prominence after his works for the song "Galti Se Mistake" from Jagga Jasoos (2017), which also won him many accolades. He has been trained in salsa, contemporary, jazz and hip hop.

== Filmography ==
=== As Choreographer ===
- Cocktail 2 (2026)
- Dhurandhar: The Revenge (2026)
- Dhurandhar (2025)
- Saiyaara (2025)
- Bhool Bhulaiyaa 3 (2024)
- Jigra (2024)
- Vicky Vidya Ka Woh Wala Video (2024)
- Stree 2 (2024)
- Munjya (2024)
- Ishq Vishk Rebound (2024)
- Teri Baaton Mein Aisa Uljha Jiya (2024)
- Pippa (2023)
- The Great Indian Family (2024)
- Atrangi Re (2021)
- Shubh Mangal Zyada Saavdhan (2020)
- Love Aaj Kal (2020)
- Bhangra Paa Le (2020)
- Bala (2019)
- Super 30 (2019)
- Kesari (2019)
- Badhaai Ho (2018)
- Andhadhun (2018)
- Stree (2018)
- Jagga Jasoos (2017)
- Tumhari Sulu (2017)
- Baadshaho
- Hate Story 3 (2015)

=== As Chief Assistant Choreographer ===
- Bhaag Milkha Bhaag (2013)
- Zokkomon (2011)
- Aladdin (2009)
- Rab Ne Bana Di Jodi (2008)
- Little Zizou (2008)
- Yuvvraaj (2008)
- Taare Zameen Par (2007)
- I See You (2006)
- Bunty Aur Babli (2005)

== Awards and nominations ==
Film	Award	Category	Work	Result	Ref.
Jagga Jasoos	Screen Awards 2017	Best Choreography	"Galti Se Mistake"	Nominated	
Jagga Jasoos	Zee Cine Awards	Best Choreography	"Galti Se Mistake"	Won	
Jagga Jasoos	Bollywood Film Journalists Awards	Best Choreography	"Galti Se Mistake"	Won	
Jagga Jasoos	19th IIFA Awards	Best Choreography	"Galti Se Mistake"	Won	
Jagga Jasoos	63rd Filmfare Awards	Best Choreography	"Galti Se Mistake"	Won	
Jagga Jasoos	63rd Filmfare Awards	Best Choreography	"Khaana Khaake"	Nominated	
Tumhari Sulu	63rd Filmfare Awards	Best Choreography	"Ban Ja Rani"	Nominated	
Atrangi Re	22nd IIFA Awards	Best Choreography	"Chaka Chak"	Won	
Atrangi Re	67th Filmfare Awards	Best Choreography	"Chaka Chak"	Won	
