= Satrangee Parachute =

2011 film directed by Vineet Khetrepal

- Theatrical release poster
- Directed by: Vineet Khetrepal
- Screenplay by: Pulakesh Bhowmik
- Story by: Pulakesh Bhowmik
- Produced by: Vineet Khetrepal
- Starring: Jackie Shroff; Kay Kay Menon; Zakir Hussain; Rajpal Yadav; Rupali Ganguly; Azaan Rustam Shah; Sanjay Mishra; Sanjay Swaraj
- Cinematography: Soumik Haldar
- Edited by: Pranav V. Dhiwar; Sanjib Dutta
- Music by: Shamir Tandon; Kaushik Dutta
- Distributed by: Wonderworks Films
- Release date: 25 February 2011
- Running time: 115 minutes
- Country: India
- Language: Hindi

Satrangee Parachute (transl. A rainbow-coloured parachute) is a Hindi-language film that was released on 25 February 2011. The film revolves around an eight-year-old kid who runs away from his village in Nainital to Mumbai with four of his friends.

== Plot ==
Pappu (Siddhartha Sanghani), leader of a group of precocious kids, sets off to find a parachute for their visually impaired friend Kuhu. Pappu's parents, Chhotulal (Zakir Hussain) and Sumitra (Rupali Ganguly), worry for him but this is not the first time he has run away. However, the other parents are angry with Pappu for leading their kids astray.

When the five children overhear a man (Ashraf-ul-Haq) mention buying a parachute, the kids follow him and his friends, but it turns out that the four men are terrorists planning an operation needing parachutes.

The police mistake the five kids as members of the terrorists and they are arrested. The investigating officer Rhino (Kay Kay Menon) gets nothing from the kids, so his commanding officer (Jackie Shroff) takes over.

== Cast ==
- Rajvi Patel as Kuhu
- Jackie Shroff as Jay Singh
- Rupali Ganguly as Sumitra C. Sharma
- Sanjay Mishra as Daroga Pratap Singh
- Kay Kay Menon as Rhino
- Rajpal Yadav as Parimal Babu
- Lilliput Faruqui

== Soundtrack ==
The music was composed by Kaushik Dutta, Shamir Tandon and released by Saregama.

Satrangee Parachute

Soundtrack album by Kaushik Dutta Shamir Tandon
- Released: 2011
- Recorded: 2011
- Genre: Soundtrack
- Length: 36:02
- Label: Saregama
- Producers: Kaushik Dutta; Shamir Tandon

Track list
No.	Title	Lyrics	Music	Singer(s)	Length
1.	"Tere Hasne Se"	Rajeev Barnwal	Shamir Tandon	Lata Mangeshkar	5:19
2.	"Zindagi Ki Raah Mein" (Title Track)	Rajeev Barnwal	Kaushik Dutta	Kailash Kher	3:53
3.	"Mere Paas Aao" (Mr. Natwarlal Remix)	Rajeev Barnwal	Shamir Tandon	Usha Uthup	5:10
4.	"Chal Pade Hum" (Journey Song)	Rajeev Barnwal	Kaushik Dutta	Shaan	5:07
5.	"Udd Jaa Udd Jaa"	Pinky Poonawala	Kaushik Dutta	Abhilasha, Ali Sher, Khurram Iqbal	3:27
6.	"Mere Bachche" (Lullaby)	Rajeev Barnwal	Kaushik Dutta	Shreya Ghoshal	4:34
7.	"Satrangee Theme" (Colours Of Life)		Kaushik Dutta	Instrumental	3:01
8.	"Teri Lori"	Rajeev Barnwal	Kaushik Dutta	Rahat Fateh Ali Khan	5:31
Total length:					36:02

== Reception ==
The Times of India gave Satrangee Parachute 2 stars out of 5, saying "Why does the world's biggest film industry dish out the saddest kiddie films, week after week? Why can't Bollywood go the Hollywood way and treat children's film as hardcore, high market entertainment? Why must our film makers give the tween and teen film market a step motherly treatment. Sadly Satrangee Parachute fails to address any of these questions with its narrative that appeals neither to kids nor to adults."
