= Anil Ganguly =

Indian film director

- Born: 26 January 1933; Calcutta, Bengal Presidency, British India (now West Bengal, India)
- Died: 15 January 2016 (aged 82); Mumbai, Maharashtra, India
- Occupations: Director; Screenwriter
- Years active: 1962–1998
- Notable work: Kora Kagaz; Tapasya (1976 film)
- Relatives: Rupali Ganguly (daughter); Vijay Ganguly (son)

Anil Ganguly (26 January 1933 – 15 January 2016) was an Indian film director and screenwriter, who worked in Hindi cinema from 1970s to 2001. He is best known for Jaya Bhaduri-starrer Kora Kagaz (1974) and the Raakhee-starrer Tapasya (1975), both of which won the National Film Award for Best Popular Film Providing Wholesome Entertainment. He is also known for his films with Raakhee, including Trishna, Aanchal, and Saaheb (1985). In 1990, Raakhee and Tapas Paul featured in his Bengali film Balidan which became a massive financial grosser.

== Career ==
Ganguly started his career making literary adaptations with strong female roles and themes of marital discord. For his second film Kora Kagaz his adapted Ashutosh Mukhopadhyay's story "Saat Paake Bandha", previously adapted into a Bengali film by the same name. Films female lead Jaya Bhaduri won Filmfare Best Actress Award for her role. His next film, Tapasya (1975) with Raakhee as lead was produced by Rajshri Productions, and was based on story by Ashapurna Devi. Raakhee won the Filmfare Best Actress Award for her role He later adapted Sarat Chandra Chattopadhyay's novel Parineeta as Sankoch (1976), with Sulakshana Pandit and Jeetendra as leads. Humkadam again starring Raakhee, and made in 1980, was an adaptation of Satyajit Ray's Mahanagar.

He made Aanchal with Rajesh Khanna as the lead hero and the film turned out to be platinum jubilee hit. His last major film was Anil Kapoor and Amrita Singh starrer Saaheb (1985). Later in his career, he shifted to making action and thriller films but nine of 9 films he made since 1986 were unsuccessful at the box office. His last directorial venture was Odia film Kiye Para Kiye Najara (1998) with Tapas Paul, and Debashree Roy. He died on 15 January 2016 at the age of 82.

== Awards ==
Year	Title	Category	Work	Ref.
1974	National Film Award	Best Popular Film Providing Wholesome Entertainment	Kora Kagaz	
1975	National Film Award	Best Popular Film Providing Wholesome Entertainment	Tapasya	

== Filmography ==
- All films are in Hindi unless otherwise noted.

Year	Title	Note
1962	Half Ticket	Assistant director
1965	Bheegi Raat	Assistant director
1974	Kora Kagaz	
1976	Tapasya	
1976	Sankoch	
1978	Trishna	
1979	Khandaan	
1980	Agreement	
1980	Neeyat	
1980	Aanchal	
1980	Humkadam	
1982	Karwat	
1983	Kaun? Kaisey?	
1985	Saaheb	
1987	Mera Yaar Mera Dushman	
1987	Pyar Ke Kabil	
1987	Sadak Chhap	
1990	Balidan	Bengali film
1991	Dushman Devta	
1993	Dil Ki Baazi	
1996	Angaara	
1998	Kiye Para Kiye Nijara	Odia film

== Personal life ==
His daughter, Rupali Ganguly is television, film and theatre actress. His son, Vijay Ganguly is a director and choreographer.
