= Aanchal (1980 film) =

1980 film by Anil Ganguly

- Poster
- Directed by: Anil Ganguly
- Written by: Tarasankar Bandyopadhyay (story); Sachin Bhowmick (screenplay)
- Based on: Champadangar Bou (1954)
- Produced by: Tapan Chatterjee; Ramesh Bhatia; Mohan Lalwani; Prem Lalwani
- Starring: Rajesh Khanna; Raakhee; Rekha; Prem Chopra; Amol Palekar
- Cinematography: Dilip Ranjan Mukherjee
- Edited by: Waman Bhonsle; Gurudutt Shirali
- Music by: R D Burman
- Distributed by: Baba Digital Media; Shemaroo Video Pvt. Ltd.
- Release date: 18 September 1980
- Running time: 160 minutes
- Country: India
- Language: Hindi

Aanchal is a 1980 Indian Hindi-language drama film directed by Anil Ganguly. It was a remake of Bengali film Champadangar Bou (1954), which itself was based on a novel of the same name by Tarasankar Bandyopadhyay. It stars Rajesh Khanna, Raakhee and Rekha in leading roles and supported by Prem Chopra and Amol Palekar. This story basically revolves around a relationship shared by Rajesh Khanna and Raakhee. The music is by R. D. Burman. The songs are sung by Kishore Kumar, Lata Mangehkar and Asha Bhonsle.

== Plot ==
It is the story of an Indian woman, as pure as Sita, who is tested by a series of family events and problems. The story revolves around the relationship between Shambu (Rajesh) and his sister-in-law Shanti (Raakhee). People in the village start speculating whether Shambu is romantically involved with Shanti, and even Kishan starts doubting his brother's intentions. Tulsi who loves Shambu, too, starts thinking bad about Shambu.

== Cast ==
- Rajesh Khanna as Shambu
- Raakhee as Shanti
- Rekha as Tulsi
- Prem Chopra as Jaggan Prasad
- Amol Palekar as Kishan Lal
- Jankidas as man who disrupts the Ramleela drama
- Leela Mishra as Ishwarya
- Birbal as 'Sugreev' in drama and Murali barber
- Master Ravi as Hemchand DESU
- Master Sandeep as Chedi
- Asit Sen as Govt survey officer
- Amol Sen as Farmer selling cows to Kishan
- Abhi Bhattacharya as Ramleela Drama singer
- Dinesh Hingoo as Mutthu, Jaggan's driver
- Viju Khote as Jaggan's henchman
- Shammi as Chachi
- Ranjana Sachdev as Kaluwa's mother
- Sarita Devi as Jaggan's mother

== Music ==
Songs for Khanna are sung by Kishore Kumar, for Raakhee by Lata Mangehkar and for Rekha by Asha Bhonsle. Songs were written by Majrooh Sultanpuri.

1. "Bas Meri Jaa" – Kishore Kumar, Lata Mangeshkar
2. "Aisa Rangeen Sama" – Kishore Kumar
3. "Paise Ka Kajal" – Kishore Kumar, Asha Bhonsle
4. "Lanka Chale Ramji" – Kishore Kumar, Sapan Chakraborty
5. "Bhor Bhaye Panchi" – Lata Mangeshkar
6. "Jane De Gaadi Teri" – Asha Bhonsle
