= List of awards and nominations received by Rupali Ganguly =

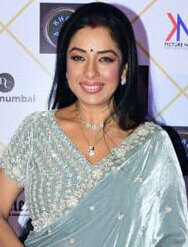
Ganguly in 2022

Rupali Ganguly is an Indian actress who works in Hindi television along with films. Ganguly has won several accolades mostly noted for Anupamaa and is best known for playing Anupamaa in the series. She has received two Indian Television Academy Awards, two Iconic Gold Awards and two Indian Telly Awards. Ganguly is also known for portraying Manisha "Monisha" Singh Sarabhai in the sitcom Sarabhai vs Sarabhai which earned her a nomination for Indian Telly Award for Best Actress in a Comic Role.

== Indian Television Academy Awards ==
The Indian Television Academy Awards, also known as the (ITA Awards) is an annual event organised by the Indian Television Academy. The awards are presented in various categories, including popular programming (music, news, entertainment, sports, travel, lifestyle and fashion), best television channel in various categories, technical awards, and Best Performance awards.

Year	Category	Show	Character	Result
2021	Best Actress (Popular)	Anupamaa	Anupamaa	Won
2021	Best Actress (Drama)	Anupamaa	Anupamaa	Nominated
2022	Best Actress (Popular)	Anupamaa	Anupamaa	Nominated
2022	Best Actress (Drama)	Anupamaa	Anupamaa	Nominated
2023	Best Actress (Popular)	Anupamaa	Anupamaa	Nominated
2023	Best Actress (Drama)	Anupamaa	Anupamaa	Nominated
2024	Best Actress (Popular)	Anupamaa	Anupamaa	Nominated
2024	Best Actress (Drama)	Anupamaa	Anupamaa	Nominated
2024	Best TV Personality	Anupamaa	Anupamaa	Won
2025	Best Actress (Popular)	Anupamaa	Anupamaa	Won

== Indian Telly Awards ==
The 'Indian Telly Awards' are annual honours presented by the company of Indian Television to persons and organisations in the television industry of India. The Awards are given in several categories such as best programme or series in a specific genre, best television channel in a particular category, most popular actors and awards for technical roles such as writers and directors.

Year	Category	Show	Character	Result
2004	Best Negative Actress	Sanjivani	Simran Chopra	Nominated
2005	Best Actress in a Comic Role	Sarabhai vs Sarabhai	Manisha "Monisha" Singh Sarabhai	Nominated
2023	Best Actress in Lead Role	Anupamaa	Anupamaa	Won
2023	Best Onscreen Couple (with Gaurav Khanna)	Anupamaa	Anupamaa	Won
2023	Best TV Personality	Anupamaa	Anupamaa	Nominated
2023	Fans Favorite Actress	Anupamaa	Anupamaa	Nominated
2025	Best Actress in a Lead Role	Anupamaa	Anupamaa	Nominated
2025	Fan Favorite Actress	Anupamaa	Anupamaa	Won
2025	Best Television Personality of the Year	—	—	Won

== Gold Awards ==
The Zee Gold Awards (also known as the Gold Television or Boroplus Awards) are honours presented excellence in the television industry. The Awards are given in several categories.

Year	Category	Show	Character	Result
2022	Best Actress in a Lead Role	Anupamaa	Anupamaa	Nominated
2022	Gold Best Onscreen Jodi (with Gaurav Khanna)	Anupamaa	Anupamaa	Nominated

== Iconic Gold Awards ==
Year	Category	Show	Character	Result
2023	Iconic Best Actress	Anupamaa	Anupamaa	Won
2024	Iconic Best Actress	Anupamaa	Anupamaa	Won
2025	Most Influential Personality Television Female	Anupamaa	Anupamaa	Won

== Pinkvilla Style Icon Awards ==
Year	Category	Show	Character	Result
2024	Best Actor TV – Female	Anupamaa	Anupamaa	Won
2025	Best Actor TV – Female	Anupamaa	Anupamaa	Won

== Other awards and recognition ==
Year	Award / Organisation	Category	work	Result
2022	Lions Gold Awards	Best Actress	Anupamaa	Won
2023	Lions Gold Awards	Best Actress	Anupamaa	Won
2023	Bollywood Hungama Style Icons Awards	Most Stylish TV Actor of the Year – Female	—	Won
