= Saroj Khan =

Indian dancer and choreographer (1948–2020)

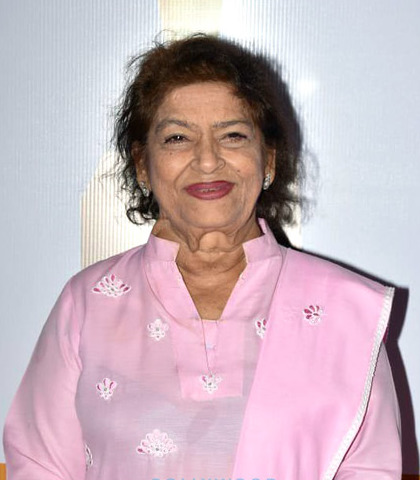
- Khan in 2020
- Born: Saroj Kishanchand Sadhu Singh Nagpal; 22 November 1948; Bombay, Bombay State, India
- Died: 3 July 2020 (aged 71); Mumbai, Maharashtra, India
- Occupation: Choreographer
- Years active: 1958–2020
- Spouses: B. Sohanlal (m. 1961; sep. 1965) Sardar Roshan Khan (m. 1975)
- Children: 4

Saroj Khan (born Saroj Kishanchand Sadhu Singh Nagpal; 22 November 1948 – 3 July 2020) was an Indian dance choreographer in Hindi cinema. She was best known for the dance form mujra and the first woman choreographer in Bollywood. With a career spanning over forty years, she choreographed over 3000 songs and received several accolades, including four National Film Awards and record eight Filmfare Awards for Best Choreography.

== Personal life ==
She was born Nirmala Nagpal. Her parents, Kishanchand Sadhu Singh and Noni Singh, migrated to India after partition of India. She started her career as a child artist at the age of three with the film Nazarana as baby Shyama, and was a background dancer in the late 1950s. She learnt dance while working under film choreographer B. Sohanlal, whom she married at the age of 13 while he was 43 years and was already married with 4 children which she did not know at the time of marriage.

After having three children (including one that died as an infant), the couple separated; after their separation, she married businessman Sardar Roshan Khan in 1975 and changed her name after converting to Islam. The couple have one child together: a daughter, Sukaina Khan, who is known to run a dance institute in Dubai.

== Career ==
Khan moved to choreography, first as an assistant choreographer and later getting her break as an independent choreographer, with actress Sadhana's Geeta Mera Naam (1974). However, she had to wait many years to receive acclaim, which came with her work with Sridevi; their songs together such as Hawa Hawai in Mr India (1987), Main Teri Dushman, Dushman Tu Mera in Nagina (1986) and Mere Haathon Mein in Chandni (1989), and later her collaborations with Madhuri Dixit, starting with the hit "Ek Do Teen" in Tezaab (1988), Tamma Tamma Loge in Thanedaar (1990) and Dhak Dhak Karne Laga in Beta (1992) are hailed as iconic Bollywood dance numbers. Thereafter, she went on to become one of the most successful Bollywood choreographers.

In 2014, Khan worked with Madhuri Dixit again in Gulaab Gang. She was on the advisory board of Rishihood University.

=== Television appearances ===
Saroj Khan appeared on a reality dance show as a member of the jury in the first season of Nach Baliye, which aired on STAR One along with two other judges. She also appeared in the second season of the same show. She has recently been a judge for the show Ustaadon Ka Ustaad, which is aired on Sony Entertainment Television (India). She appeared on the 2008 show Nachle Ve with Saroj Khan, which was aired on NDTV Imagine. She choreographed for this show. She appeared on Sony's Boogie Woogie from December 2008 as one of the judges, along with Javed Jaffrey, Naved Jaffrey and Ravi Behl. She was a judge on the third season of a popular show – Jhalak Dikhhla Jaa, which began on 27 February 2009 and was aired on Sony Entertainment Television (India) alongside former Nach Baliye judge Vaibhavi Merchant and actress Juhi Chawla. She also judged the dance reality show Nachle Ve with Saroj Khan.

In 2012, The Saroj Khan Story, a documentary produced by PSBT and Films Division of India and directed by Nidhi Tuli was released.

She appeared in Taarak Mehta Ka Ooltah Chashmah as a judge in a dance competition.

She won three National Film Awards and eight Filmfare Awards, the most recognition of any choreographer.

Her son Raju Khan is a choreographer and producer.

== Death ==
Khan was admitted to Guru Nanak Hospital at Bandra, Mumbai on 17 June 2020, because of breathing difficulties, and died of cardiac arrest on 3 July 2020 at the age of 71.

== Selected filmography ==
Year	Film	Notes	Ref.
2026	Hum Mein Shahenshah Koun	Posthumous release	
2019	Kalank		
2019	Manikarnika: The Queen of Jhansi		
2016	Byomkesh Pawrbo	Bengali	
2015	Tanu Weds Manu Returns		
2014	Gulaab Gang		
2014	Kochadaiiyaan	Tamil	
2013	ABCD: Any Body Can Dance		
2012	Rowdy Rathore		
2012	Agent Vinod		
2010	Khatta Meetha		
2009	Life Partner		
2009	Love Aaj Kal		
2009	Delhi-6		
2007	Jab We Met	Won the National Film Award for Best Choreography	
2007	Namastey London		
2007	Guru	Won the Filmfare Award for Best Choreography	
2007	Dhan Dhana Dhan Goal		
2007	Saawariya		
2007	Sringaram	Won the National Film Award for Best Choreography	
2006	Don - The Chase Begins Again		
2006	Fanaa		
2005	Mangal Pandey: The Rising		
2004	Veer-Zaara		
2004	Swades		
2004	Kuch Naa Kaho		
2003	Dhund: The Fog		
2002	Saathiya		
2002	Devdas	Won the Filmfare Award for Best Choreography & National Film Award	
2001	Lagaan: Once Upon a Time in India	Won the Filmfare Award for Best Choreography	
2001	Hum Ho Gaye Aapke		
2000	Fiza		
1999	Taal		
1999	Hum Dil De Chuke Sanam	Won the Filmfare Award for Best Choreography & American Choreography Award	
1998	Soldier		
1998	Vinashak - Destroyer		
1998	Choodalani Vundi	Telugu	
1997	Aur Pyaar Ho Gaya		
1997	Pardes		
1997	Iruvar	Tamil	
1996	Khamoshi: The Musical		
1995	Dilwale Dulhania Le Jayenge		
1995	Raja		
1995	Yaraana		
1994	Hum Hain Bemisaal		
1994	Mohra		
1994	Anjaam		
1993	Baazigar		
1993	Anmol		
1993	Tholi Muddhu	Telugu	
1993	Aaina		
1993	Khalnayak		
1993	Darr		
1992	Beta		
1992	Vishwatma		
1990	Awaargi		
1990	Thanedaar		
1990	Sailaab		
1989	Chandni		
1989	Chaalbaaz		
1989	Nigahen: Nagina Part II		
1988	Tezaab		
1987	Kizhakku Africavil Sheela	Tamil	
1987	Mr. India		
1987	Hifazat		
1986	Nagina		
1983	Hero		
1983	Thai Veedu	Tamil	
1974	Geeta Mera Naam		
1970	Dupatta	as stage dancer (Punjabi Movie)	

As writer

- Veeru Dada (1990)
- Khiladi (1992)
- Hum Hain Bemisaal (1994)
- Nazar Ke Samne (1995)
- Chhote Sarkar (1996)
- Dil Tera Diwana (1996)
- Daava (1997)
- Judge Mujrim (1997)
- Bhai Bhai (1997)
- Hote Hote Pyar Ho Gaya (1999)
- Benaam (1999)
- Khanjar (2003)

== Awards and recognitions ==
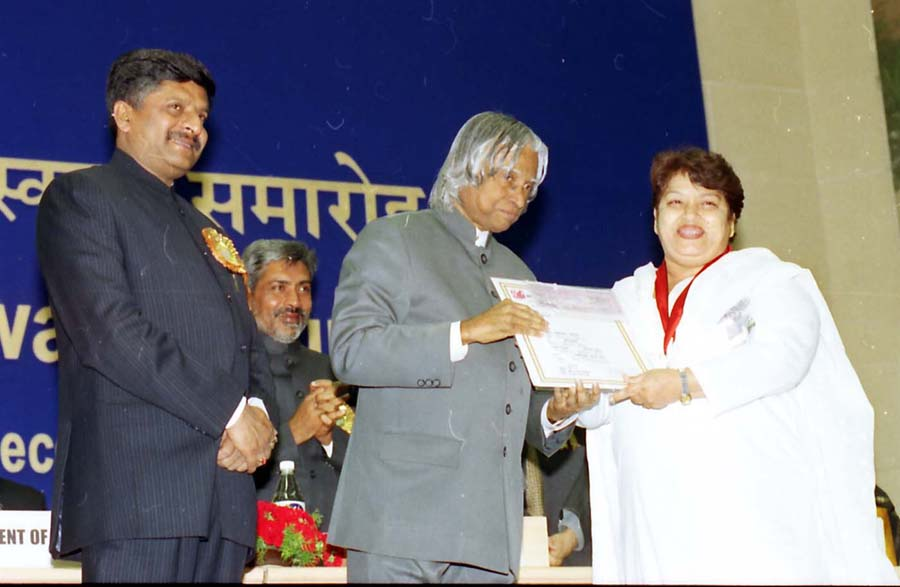
Khan receiving the National Film Award for Best Choreography for Dola Re Dola by President A. P. J. Abdul Kalam in December 2003.

Khan was the recipient of the most National Film Awards for Best Choreography with three wins.

Khan was the first recipient of the Filmfare Award for Best Choreography. Filmfare instituted this award after watching the excellent choreography and audience response in Khan's song "Ek Do Teen" from Tezaab. Khan went on to have a hattrick at the Filmfare Awards winning consistently for 3 years from 1989 to 1991. She also held the record for winning the most Filmfare Awards for Best Choreography, winning 8.

The Saroj Khan Story is a 2012 Indian documentary film on Khan's life directed by Nidhi Tuli and produced by Public Service Broadcasting Trust.

=== National Film Awards ===
Year	Film	Nominated work	Category	Result	Ref.
2003	Devdas	"Dola Re Dola"	Best Choreography	Won	
2006	Sringaram	All songs	Best Choreography	Won	
2008	Jab We Met	"Yeh Ishq Haaye"	Best Choreography	Won	

Filmfare Awards

Year	Film	Nominated work	Category	Result	Ref.
1989	Tezaab	"Ek Do Teen"	Best Choreography	Won	
1990	ChaalBaaz	"Na Jaane Kahan Se"	Best Choreography	Won	
1991	Sailaab	"Humko Aaj Kal Hai Intezaar"	Best Choreography	Won	
1993	Beta	"Dhak Dhak Karne Laga"	Best Choreography	Won	
1994	Khalnayak	"Choli Ke Peeche"	Best Choreography	Won	
2000	Hum Dil De Chuke Sanam	"Nimbooda Nimbooda"	Best Choreography	Won	
2003	Devdas	"Dola Re Dola"	Best Choreography	Won	
2008	Guru	"Barso Re"	Best Choreography	Won	

IIFA Awards

- 2000 – Best Choreography: Hum Dil De Chuke Sanam for the song "Nimbooda Nimbooda"
- 2003 – Best Choreography: Devdas for the song "Dola Re Dola"
- 2019 – Lifetime Achievement Award

Zee Cine Awards

- 2003 – Best Choreography: Devdas for the song "Dola Re Dola"

American Choreography Awards

- 2002 – Outstanding Achievement in Feature Film: Lagaan: Once Upon a Time in India (2001)

Nandi Awards

- 1998 – Nandi Award for Best Choreographer: Choodalani Vundi

Kalakar Awards

- 2011 – 19th Annual Kalakar Achiever Award for Outstanding Contribution in Dance Choreography

== Controversies ==
In October 2014, Khan reportedly got upset after being parodied in Happy New Year. The spoof character was played by Kiku Sharda. Farah Khan denied having spoofed Saroj. Farah had earlier allegedly spoofed Manoj Kumar in her 2007 film Om Shanti Om.

In April 2018, Khan made statements defending the practice of casting couch, stating that the film industry provides people employment and "doesn't rape and abandon" them. Following an online backlash, she apologised for her comments.

== See also ==
- Indian women in dance
