= Angaara =

- Directed by: Anil Ganguly
- Written by: Anil Ganguly; Tarun Ghosh
- Produced by: Hiren Bafna; Mahesh Garg; Shreeram Goyal
- Starring: Mithun Chakraborty; Simran
- Cinematography: Babu
- Music by: Dilip Sen-Sameer Sen
- Production company: Sri R.V. Films
- Release date: 13 September 1996
- Country: India
- Language: Hindi

Angaara is a 1996 Indian Hindi-language action film directed by Anil Ganguly, and starring Mithun Chakraborty, Rupali Ganguly, Sadashiv Amrapurkar. The film's music was by the duo Dilip Sen and Sameer Sen. It did not do well at the box office.

== Plot ==
Sagar lives with his mother, younger brother and a younger sister. He has never met his father, who had abandoned his mother. Sagar is a thief, a secret not known to anyone else including his family. He uses different disguises to steal from Dhaniram Koilewala and Pascal. Dhaniram and Pascal go to Honda Dada for help. Honda decides to help them. Meanwhile, Sagar comes across a man, Om Prakash who would help him to find his father. Sagar soon finds out that Om has a different plan. Honda and his men too find out who Sagar is and thus Sagar's and his family's life is at risk. How would he save himself and his family from them is the real question.

== Cast ==
- Mithun Chakraborty as Sagar
- Kamal Sadanah as Vishal
- Simran as Pooja Pascal
- Sadashiv Amrapurkar as Police Inspector Shyamu Nath
- Rupali Ganguly as Gulabi
- Suresh Bhagwat as Bankelal, Gulabi's maternal uncle
- Hemant Birje as Chotu
- Suresh Chatwal as Vinay, Gulabi's maternal uncle
- Sudhir Dalvi as Sagar's father
- Tarun Ghosh as Vidyacharan
- Farida Jalal as Saraswati
- Mohan Joshi as Om Prakash
- Rami Reddy as Honda Dada
- Goga Kapoor as Pascal
- Harish Patel as Dhaniram Koilewala

== Music ==
Angaara

Studio album by Dilip Sen-Sameer Sen
- Released: 1996

1. "Jeevan Hai Sangram" - Kumar Sanu
2. "Aaja Gori Banki Chhori" - Kumar Sanu, Kavita Krishnamurthy
3. "Dheere Dheere Bolna Mere Sang" - Mohammed Aziz, Kavita Krishnamurthy
4. "Gore Gore Gaalwali" - Udit Narayan, Sadhana Sargam,
5. "Aara Hile Chhapra Hile" - Udit Narayan, Alka Yagnik
6. "Tun Tuna Tun Tuna" - Abhijeet, Poornima
