= IIFA Award for Best Choreography =

Annual film award in India

The IIFA Award for Best Choreography is a technical award chosen ahead of the International Indian Film Academy Awards ceremonies. Saroj Khan received the first choreography award in 2000. Farah Khan (6 wins) is the most awarded choreographer followed by duo Bosco–Caesar (3 wins) and Saroj Khan / Vaibhavi Merchant / Ganesh Acharya / Vijay Ganguly / Remo D'Souza (2 wins each).

== Multiple wins ==
Wins	Recipient
6	Farah Khan
3	Bosco–Caesar
2	Saroj Khan, Vaibhavi Merchant, Ganesh Acharya, Vijay Ganguly, Remo D'Souza

== Awards ==
The winners are listed below:-

Year	Winner(s)	Film
2024	Bosco–Caesar	Pathaan ("Jhoome Jo Pathaan")
2023	Bosco–Caesar	Bhool Bhulaiyaa 2 ("Bhool Bhulaiyaa (Title Track)")
2022	Vijay Ganguly	Atrangi Re ("Chaka Chak")
2020	Bosco–Caesar	War ("Ghunghroo")
2019	Kruti Mahesh, Jyothi D. Tomar	Padmaavat ("Ghoomar")
2018	Vijay Ganguly, Ruel Dausan Varindani	Jagga Jasoos ("Galti Se Mistake")
2017	Adil Shaikh	Kapoor & Sons ("Kar Gayi Chull")
2016	Remo D'Souza	Bajirao Mastani ("Pinga")
2015	Ahmed Khan	Kick ("Jumme Ki Raat")
2014	Remo D'Souza	Yeh Jawaani Hai Deewani ("Badtameez Dil")
2013	Ganesh Acharya	Agneepath ("Chikni Chameli")
2012	Bosco–Caesar	Zindagi Na Milegi Dobara ("Senorita")
2011	Farah Khan	Dabangg ("Munni Badnaam Hui")
2010	Bosco–Caesar	Love Aaj Kal ("Chor Bazaari")
2009	Farah Khan	Dostana ("Desi Girl")
2008	Vaibhavi Merchant	Aaja Nachle ("Aaja Nachle")
2007	Ganesh Acharya	Omkara ("Beedi")
2006	Vaibhavi Merchant	Bunty Aur Babli ("Kajra Re")
2005	Farah Khan	Mujhse Shaadi Karogi ("Laal Dupatta")
2004	Farah Khan	Kal Ho Naa Ho ("Maahi Ve")
2003	Saroj Khan	Devdas ("Dola Re Dola")
2002	Farah Khan	Dil Chahta Hai ("Woh Ladki Hai Kahaan")
2001	Farah Khan	Kaho Naa... Pyaar Hai ("Ek Pal Ka Jeena")
2000	Saroj Khan	Hum Dil De Chuke Sanam ("Nimbooda")

== See also ==
- IIFA Awards
- Bollywood
- Cinema of India
