= Kan Simittum Neram =

- Poster
- Directed by: Kalaivanan Kannadasan
- Written by: Kalaivanan Kannadasan
- Produced by: R. Sarathkumar; M. Santhanam
- Starring: Karthik; Ambika; R. Sarathkumar
- Cinematography: G. Dhanapal
- Edited by: K. Ramalingam
- Music by: V. S. Narasimhan
- Production company: Varalaxmi Creations
- Release date: 13 April 1988
- Running time: 140 minutes
- Country: India
- Language: Tamil

Kan Simittum Neram (transl. Eye blinking time) is a 1988 Indian Tamil-language thriller film directed by Kalaivanan Kannadasan in his debut. The film stars Karthik, Ambika and R. Sarathkumar in his Tamil debut, and was released on 13 April 1988. It was remade in Hindi as Sailaab (1990).

== Plot ==
The film begins with a man trying to kill Lakshmi, but he missed his attempt and killed her aunt. While escaping, he got an accident and forgot everything. Since that day, the doctor Lakshmi took care of him. She didn't know about him so she named him Kannan. Inspector Sarath investigated on the Lakshmi's aunt murder and Kannan's past.

Sarath then found a photo of Kannan and Lakshmi, he went to the photo's store to know the truth. A third person was involved in this affair. Sarath found him and the man revealed the truth. The man, Ravi, was in love with Vani. Her father arranged a marriage to Vani, so Ravi did some photo-trick to stop the wedding. He produced a photo showing Vani's fiancé with a woman in wedding attire, the woman's photo was taken from a marriage mediator. The marriage was finally cancelled, therefore, Ravi and Vani got married. The inspector went to Vani's fiancé house, met his uncle who revealed that Raja has disappeared and he told him everything. Raja was a son of a pious small family and he worked for a company in the nearby town. A family came, saw Raja's sister and agreed to marry her. To pay the bride price, Raja accepted to marry Vani. A photo somehow came to the knowledge of Raja's sister's groom side and they stopped the marriage proposal. Raja's mother and sister committed suicide thinking that Raja has backstabbed them by marrying a woman. Raja came home, discovered the death of his family member and decided to get revenge on Lakshmi, the woman on the photo with him.

Inspector Sarath has orders to capture Raja. In the meantime, Lakshmi and Raja go to Ooty. Sarath calls her to prevent it but Lakshmi does not take it seriously. During playing Hide-and-seek, Raja falls and is knocked out. When he wakes up, his memory returns and he has the desire to kill Lakshmi. What transpires eventually is an interesting climax.

== Cast ==
- Karthik as Raja / Kannan
- Ambika as Lakshmi
- R. Sarathkumar as Inspector Sarath
- Roshni as Gowri
- Kutty Padmini as Vaani
- Vinoth as Ravi
- Senthil as Kannayiram (Kanna)
- S. S. Chandran as Pirambaram (Pinna)
- Poornam Viswanathan as a doctor
- T. S. Raghavendra as Vaani's father

== Production ==
Kan Simittum Neram is the directorial debut of Kalaivanan Kannadasan. The film marks Sarathkumar's debut in Tamil cinema. It is also his first film as producer.

== Soundtrack ==
The soundtrack was composed by V. S. Narasimhan. The song "Vizhigalil Kodi" is set in Mayamalavagowla raga.

Track listing
| No. | Title | Lyrics | Singer(s) | Length |
|---|---|---|---|---|
| 1. | "Mamanthan" | Uma Kannadasan | Malaysia Vasudevan, K. S. Chithra | 4:24 |
| 2. | "Ragam Pudhu Ragam" | Tamilmani | K. J. Yesudas | 4:34 |
| 3. | "Thane Paduthe" | Kalaivanar Kannadasan | P. Susheela | 4:19 |
| 4. | "Vizhigalil Kodi Abinayam" | Vaira Vijayam | S. P. Balasubrahmanyam, K. S. Chithra | 4:19 |
| Total length: | | | | 17:36 |

== Release and reception ==
Kan Simittum Neram was released on 13 April 1988. Jayamanmadhan of Kalki praised the film for the direction, photography, music and for maintaining the suspense. The Indian Express wrote, "Kalaivanan Kannadasan directing his first film, has to answer for a sloppy script [..] but the good beginning and end perhaps mean that he has just made a beginning and this is not the end".
