= Sailaab (1990 film) =

1990 Indian film by Deepak Balraj Vij

- Promotional Poster
- Directed by: Deepak Balraj Vij
- Written by: Achala Nagar (dialogues)
- Screenplay by: Reema Rakesh Nath
- Story by: Kalaivanan Kannadasan
- Produced by: Surender Jain
- Starring: Aditya Pancholi; Madhuri Dixit; Suresh Oberoi
- Cinematography: Manish Bhatt
- Edited by: Prashant Khedekar; Vinod Nayak
- Music by: Songs: Bappi Lahiri; Background Score: Aadesh Shrivastava
- Release date: 31 August 1990
- Country: India
- Language: Hindi

Sailaab (English: Flood) is an Indian Hindi-language suspense thriller film of 1990 directed by Deepak Balraj Vij, starring Aditya Pancholi and Madhuri Dixit in lead roles. This film is a remake of 1988 Tamil film Kan Simittum Neram.

Saroj Khan won the Filmfare Best Choreography Award for Madhuri's dance for the song "Humko Aaj Kal Hai Intezaar". The song also features in "Top 10 songs of Madhuri Dixit" published by Times of India.

== Plot ==
Dr. Sushma Malhotra (Madhuri Dixit) treats her patient, a kind thief and killer (Aditya Pancholi), who has lost his memory in an accident. She renames him Krishna. For the care she takes, Krishna falls in love with her, and then they get married. Soon after they are married, however, Inspector Ranjeet Kapoor (Suresh Oberoi) warns her that her husband was set to kill her before his accident and may again attempt to kill her, but she disregards this. In another accident, while taking photographs of Sushma, Krishna falls and hurts his head. This injury brings back his old memories about his beloved sister's suicide in her failed marriage because Sushma attached a false photo of them and wrote a false letter saying she was pregnant with his child, which resulted in him trying to kill her. He says his name is Rajeev and claims Sushma killed his sister, but Inspector Ranjeet arrives in time to stop him and tell him a criminal named Monty actually killed his sister. Together, Inspector Ranjeet and Rajeev find Monty and his gang, and Monty confesses to killing Rajeev's sister because he wanted to blackmail him. Rajeev kills him while Inspector Ranjeet kills his gang. An injured Rajeev regrets harming his wife, and they are united, saying that he is not Rajeev; he is her "Krishna."

== Cast ==
- Aditya Pancholi as Rajeev / Krishna
- Madhuri Dixit as Dr. Sushma Malhotra
- Kulbhushan Kharbanda as Dr. Din
- Suresh Oberoi as Inspector Ranjeet Kapoor
- Shafi Inamdar as Inspector Haidar Ali
- Om Shivpuri as Mr. Mathur
- Leena Kamat
- Kishore Namit
- Anand Balraj as Monty

== Awards ==
- Filmfare Award: Best Choreography to Saroj Khan for the song "Humko Aaj Kal Hai Intezaar".

== Soundtrack ==
The songs are composed by Bappi Lahiri and lyrics were penned by Javed Akhtar. Aadesh Shrivastava did the background music for the film.

| Song | Singer |
|---|---|
| "Mujhko Yeh Zindagi" | Asha Bhosle, Amit Kumar |
| "Palkon Ke Tale Jo Sapne Pale" | Amit Kumar, Kavita Krishnamurthy |
| "Jhoome Hawayen Aur Jhoome Fizayen" | Sudesh Bhosle, Anupama Deshpande, Mangal Singh |
| "Humko Aaj Kal Hai" | Anupama Deshpande |
