= Dushman Devta =

- Theatrical release poster
- Directed by: Anil Ganguly
- Written by: Anwar Khan
- Story by: Sachin Bhowmick
- Produced by: Anil Ganguly
- Starring: Dharmendra; Dimple Kapadia; Aditya Pancholi; Sonam
- Cinematography: Pratap Singh
- Music by: Bappi Lahiri; Indeevar (lyrics); Anjaan (lyrics)
- Production company: Shri R.V. Films International
- Release date: 29 March 1991
- Country: India
- Language: Hindi

Dushman Devta is a 1991 Bollywood action drama film directed by Anil Ganguly, starring Dharmendra, Dimple Kapadia, Aditya Pancholi, Sonam in lead role. The music director of the movie was Bappi Lahiri.

== Plot ==
A small town in rural India is being terrorized by wild animals and bandits. No one is able to stop them from killing and looting the residents. The only one who was able to stand against the bandits was master Dina Nath, but he was arrested and is imprisoned. When Dina Nath returns home, he befriends a young man by the name of Shiva and asks him to protect this town. Subsequently, Dina Nath is killed. Shiva is blamed for Dina Nath's death by the townspeople, severely beaten, and left for dead. But some compassionate townspeople rescue him as they think he is Lord Shiva reincarnated to save their town. They do not know that Shiva is an escaped convict, and by playing God to the simple-minded townspeople, he is merely whiling for time, so that he can carry out his very own secret agenda.

== Cast ==
- Dharmendra as Shiva
- Dimple Kapadia as Gauri
- Aditya Pancholi as Suraj
- Sonam as Ganga
- Sadashiv Amrapurkar as Raja
- Gulshan Grover as Garjan Singh
- Jankidas as Pandit
- Shreeram Lagoo as Master Dinanath
- Sulbha Deshpande as Mrs. Dinanath
- Ajit Vachani as Inspector Basermal

== Soundtrack ==
Track	Song	Singer(s)
1	"Uri Uri Baba"	Usha Uthup
2	"Bubbala Bu"	Bappi Lahiri, Alka Yagnik
3	"Ho Jaye Ho Ja"	Falguni Seth, Hema Sardesai, Bappi Lahiri
4	"Pyar Ke Ghar Mere"	Asha Bhosle
5	"Thari Aur Mari"	Anuradha Paudwal
