= Atrangi Re =

2021 Indian film by Aanand L. Rai

- Official release poster
- Directed by: Aanand L. Rai
- Written by: Himanshu Sharma
- Produced by: Aanand L. Rai; Himanshu Sharma; Bhushan Kumar; Krishan Kumar
- Starring: Dhanush; Sara Ali Khan; Akshay Kumar
- Cinematography: Pankaj Kumar
- Edited by: Hemal Kothari
- Music by: A. R. Rahman
- Production companies: T-Series Films; Colour Yellow Productions; Cape of Good Films
- Distributed by: Disney+ Hotstar
- Release date: 24 December 2021
- Running time: 137 minutes
- Country: India
- Language: Hindi

Atrangi Re (transl. O weird One ) is a 2021 Indian Hindi-language romantic comedy drama film directed by Aanand L. Rai and written by Himanshu Sharma. Produced by T-Series Films, Colour Yellow Productions and Cape of Good Films, the film stars Dhanush, Sara Ali Khan and Akshay Kumar in the leading roles. The film tells the story of a girl named Rinku who is in love with a magician named Sajjad. She gets forcibly married off to Dr. Vishu. Vishu soon falls in love with Rinku but the love triangle gets weirder when Sajjad shows up.

The film's idea was conceived by Rai in 2013, after the release of Raanjhanaa. He developed the screenplay with Sharma, exploring the subject of complexities of human emotions, especially love and was certain to cast Dhanush given the relativity of subject, script and time but the rest of the casting was eventual. As the project was officially announced in late-January 2020, the filming process began in March 2020 and completed within March 2021, despite losing out six months of filming in between owed to the COVID-19 pandemic in India. The film was shot across Varanasi, parts of Bihar, Delhi, Agra, Mumbai, and few scenes in Madurai, Karaikudi. The score and soundtrack album were composed by A. R. Rahman, with lyrics written by Irshad Kamil. The cinematography and editing were performed by Pankaj Kumar and Hemal Kothari, respectively.

After being rescheduled multiple times from its release dates, as a result of the nationwide lockdown due to the pandemic, the makers premiered the film through Disney+ Hotstar on 24 December 2021, thereby bypassing theatrical release. It was also dubbed and released in Tamil under the title Galatta Kalyaanam. The film received mixed to positive reviews from critics, praising the unconventional plot, performances of the lead actors, direction, soundtrack and score, but criticised the incoherent screenplay and execution of overall storyline.

== Plot ==
The story begins with Rinku Suryavanshi being chased by her family's goons at Siwan Junction railway station as she tries to elope with her long-term boyfriend. She is caught and beaten by her grandmother Dulhayen, who orders her to wed any bachelor to get Rinku off her hands. The following day, Rinku's aunt gives her drugged kheer, which is meant for Rinku's parents' death anniversary.

S. Venkatesh Vishwanath "Vishu" Iyer, a Tamilian doctor briefly visiting with his friend Madhusudan "MS", a psychiatrist, gets kidnapped and drugged by Rinku's uncles who were actually aiming for MS, and the two are forcefully married. They travel to New Delhi by train, where they learn that both of them oppose the marriage and already have lovers: Vishu will be engaged to his friend Mandakini "Mandy" in two days, and Rinku's boyfriend, performing artist and magician Sajjad Ali Khan, will reach Delhi in a week. The two stay for a day in a hostel where Vishu lives and there, Rinku tells Vishu how her parents were immolated to death as a result of Dulhayen's conspiracy. The two reach Madurai for Vishu's wedding but Mandy sees a trending video showing their forced marriage, thus calling off the wedding; in the drama that ensues, Vishu angrily berates Mandy's father for misbehaving with Rinku, and leaves.

Angry and sad, Vishu returns to Delhi with Rinku and realizes he loves her. However, Sajjad has arrived, and Rinku runs off to meet him. Vishu sends MS to see that Rinku leaves safely; in a twist, it is revealed that Sajjad is imaginary and Rinku is mentally ill, talking and eloping with someone who is not there. Bewildered by this, MS speculates that Sajjad may be someone from Rinku's childhood, and Rinku's growing love for Vishu creates guilt in her because she has loved Sajjad for years, and if she loves Vishu, Sajjad will have no scope to exist. He runs to Vishu, who is in the operation theatre, and tells him about "Sajjad". They leave to find Rinku. Vishu meets Rinku on a train and manages to stop her by saying that he needs to file for divorce before leaving. Vishu then hastily concludes that the love story Rinku told him could be of her parents'.

Vishu and MS devise a plan to medicate Rinku and attempt to drive "Sajjad" away as MS feels that the more Rinku's mental health improves, the more "Sajjad" will become ill. One day, a drunk Rinku kisses Vishu on the cheek and "Sajjad" sees this. The latter tells Rinku to ask Vishu what sets him apart. Vishu, in retaliation, starts to break bottles on his head and is taken to the emergency room. As an apology, "Sajjad" confesses that he will make the Taj Mahal disappear for him. Vishu and his friends gather people and just when he is about to do so, MS gives Rinku her medicine and she sees that Sajjad's "magic trick" has failed. At night, she asks Vishu why everyone was clapping even though the Taj Mahal didn't disappear. Frustrated, Vishu confesses his love for Rinku, telling her that she is his wife and he is supposed to stand by her.

"Sajjad" feels threatened by Rinku's love for Vishu and attempts suicide. MS and Vishu, being doctors, take "Sajjad" to "operate" on him. MS tells Vishu to consider letting Rinku know that "Sajjad" died on the operating table but Vishu disagrees. The next day, while filing for divorce, Rinku refuses, saying she wants both "Sajjad" and Vishu. Vishu takes her to the Delhi Junction railway station to meet "Sajjad", who is "going to Japan" for a show as she can see "Sajjad" where she intends to. He also says that he will wait for her at the station until evening so she should elope with Sajjad or change her mind and return to him.

At the station, Rinku spots "Sajjad" with a little girl who he says is Rinku herself when she was a child. He says that she must go to Vishu, her soulmate, and that this time, he will no longer return. At this point, Rinku breaks down remembering her childhood. Eventually, it is revealed through a flashback that "Sajjad" is a real person, who, in fact, is her father; he had run away with her mother Manjari, married and had Rinku. However, the Suryavanshis filed a case and Sajjad was arrested. Rinku and Manjari were forcefully brought back home. Sajjad was released from jail and started performing in the circus. Manjari often secretly attended his shows with Rinku and they spent time together.

One day, just before Sajjad's firewalking performance, the Suryavanshis replaced the artificial fuel with real fuel, which immolated Sajjad. Among the audience, Manjari realises that Sajjad is burning and runs to him to save him, but both die together in the flames in front of little Rinku. This shapes up her paracosm with Sajjad all the way into adulthood, a fact that Vishu and MS had already realised, causing them to play along. This ends when "Sajjad" disappears and Rinku runs back to Vishu, who was distributing sweets to others saying that his wife has returned. The two finally reconcile and it is shown in parallel that Vishu is carrying Rinku, just like Sajjad would carry a young Rinku.

== Cast ==
- Dhanush as Dr. S. Venkatesh Vishwanath "Vishu" Iyer, Rinku's Husband, Mandy's ex-fiance, The main protagonist
- Akshay Kumar as Sajjad Ali Khan, a magician, (Rinku's father and Manjari's husband)
- Sara Ali Khan in a dual role as
  - Rinku Sooryavanshi (Vishu's wife and Sajjad and Manjari's daughter)
    - Mannat Mishra as young Rinku
  - Manjari Sooryavanshi (Sajjad's wife and Rinku's mother)
- Seema Biswas as Dulhayen Suryavanshi (Rinku's grandmother)
- Ashish Verma as Dr. Madhusudan 'Madhu' alias (MS), (Vishu's best friend)
- Dimple Hayathi as Mandakini 'Mandy' Rao, Vishu's ex-fiancé
- Pankaj Jha as Rinku's uncle
- Ashok Banthia as Rinku's uncle
- Vijay Kumar as Matadin
- Anil Grover as Dablu
- Bharti Gola as Rinku's aunt
- Anand Babu as Vishu's father
- Nithya Ravindran as Vishu's mother
- G. Marimuthu as Mandy's father
- Jaya Swaminathan as Mandy's mother
- Gopal Dutt as a divorce lawyer

== Production ==
=== Development ===
During the production of Tanu Weds Manu: Returns (2015), writer Himanshu Sharma came up with the script idea to Rai, which did not materialise, and the latter went to work on other projects. Following the release of Zero (2018), Rai decided to revive the script which was based on human emotions, which he added: "It comes from just one thing [...] that is you are willing to fall in love. We are scared of falling in love because we are scared of getting hurt. The minute you get rid of that fear, you will understand people and their emotions better. I have been fortunate enough to meet people who are so willingly available with all their emotions." As per Rai, "when the story of Atrangi Re was discussed as an idea in 2014, Rai stated that only thing that was certain was Dhanush, the rest of the casting happened gradually. For the character of Vishu, Rai wanted Dhanush to portray another colour of his. Raanjhanaa was about redemption, but Atrangi Re, it is about a different kind of expression of love." He called the role "very layered role", citing example that "there are people who like to be silent and you don't know them at all, but then there are people like the character Vishu who are quiet, but you still understand them". Dhanush in an interview with Firstpost stated: "The director and writer attracted me to the project and that is all. I Rai to bring my madness to his character "Vishu" and that is what he tried. On designing the character Rinku, Rai called it "beautiful, restless and innocent". Khan's age went in her favour, as the role required "somebody young and fresh, without baggage".

The film was announced on 30 January 2020 under the title Atrangi Re. With Dhanush, Khan and Kumar were announced as the leading actors, Himanshu Sharma was signed to write the screenplay. Furthermore, A. R. Rahman was signed to compose the film's background score and soundtrack album and Irshad Kamil wrote lyrics to the original songs. This marked Rai's second collaboration with Rahman, Himanshu and Kamil after working together in Raanjhanaa, as well as Rahman's first soundtrack for a production by both T-Series Films and Cape Of Good Films.

Speaking about the film and its storyline, Rai stated that the film cannot be classified in any specific genre. He added: "All the three characters are funnily weird and it's their emotional journey. I am always looking for partners who are as emotionally touched as I am with the story and all three of them are like that. Every character in this film has it's [sic] own traits will put them in an unseen space." Rai decided to set the storyline in Bihar and Madurai, in belief that the film will "be an amalgamation of two Indian cultures". It has been reported that the title was initially registered by Salman Khan under his production company, and gave the title to Rai under a condition that the film was directed by Rai himself. He expressed his gratitude to Khan for giving up the title.

=== Casting ===
In March 2019, Filmfare reported Varun Dhawan to star in the film, and Alia Bhatt was considered for the leading role. However, it did not come into fruition. In June 2019, Dhanush was reported to play the leading role, he discussed about the script with Rai, who was present at the promotional event of The Extraordinary Journey of the Fakir (2019) in Mumbai. This marked the second collaboration between the Rai and Dhanush, after Raanjhanaa (2013), also being the latter's debut in Bollywood. On casting Dhanush, Rai said that "I was trying to cast actors of the Hindi cinema but no one was in a condition to play such a rooted character written. When I met Dhanush in Mumbai and discussed the script in 10 minutes, he was fascinated by the narrative and agreed to do the film."

In July 2019, Sara Ali Khan and Hrithik Roshan were considered for playing the other leading characters. An article from Mumbai Mirror, stated the film as "a love story revolving around the three lead characters". Roshan, denied his part in the film, saying that he was not contacted by Rai about his role in the film, The team decided to approach Ajay Devgn for the other leading role before Akshay Kumar signed in as the third lead. Rai stated that His role was said to be an extended cameo which Rai had refuted and further stated that "it is a special character which is demanded for the narrative". In an interview with Bombay Times, Kumar added: "I am thrilled to be working with Aanand L Rai, as I have always admired the way he has showcased his stories. When he narrated the film to me, I said 'yes' within 10 minutes. It is a challenging character to play, but at the same time, it is such a special role that my heart just couldn't say 'no' to it. I will remember it for the rest of my life." Dimple Hayathi underwent casting and look test for being paired alongside the character played by Dhanush in Mumbai by October 2020.

As per Rai, on an unusual casting that drew criticism and curiosity, he stated that "I knew that Khan would be fitting in Rinku, because she has got all the potential to get the character right. Honesty, straightforwardness, innocence... are some of the qualities that were required to play Rinku and these come naturally to her. The way she has played the character I can't imagine anyone else doing it." Talking on character played by Kumar, Rai said: "Kumar is said to have a small role in the film but his belief in the director and Rai's "strong understanding of complex human emotions". Nimrat Kaur was considered to play a pivotal role, and was also present at the shooting schedule in Delhi, however, her portion was not included in the film.

=== Filming ===
The team planned to begin shooting for the film at March 2020 and continue for 80–90 days, with the Bihar schedule being canned first and the rest of the shooting in Madurai will begin in mid-April 2020. However, filming began on 5 March 2020 at Varanasi, where the first shot canned at Kashi railway station, near Rajghat. Filming was announced for a 20-day schedule, followed by scenes planned outskirts of Varanasi. Reports stated that "Khan plays a character from Bihar and will be seen in a double role in the film. A few scenes were shot on the railway track with water sprinklers creating a rain sequence. A chase scene was also shot, where Khan's character was chased by men on a vehicle. Dhanush and the film's writer, were also present during the shoot." Filming was halted by 19 March 2020 due to COVID-19 outbreak in India. Dhanush expressed the stagnation stating that "the entire first schedule went into us settling down and getting into the skin of the character, understanding the world of Atrangi Re. But as we [Dhanush and Khan] were going to dive into the world, the lockdown happened. We didn't do anything for about six months and the stagnation was traumatic".

In July 2020, it was reported that the film might restart shooting from October 2020. Rai had planned to shoot the film in real locations across Madurai, Delhi and Mumbai, as other films were being shot at confined studio set-up due to the pandemic restrictions. The team planned to set up the shooting schedule at Madurai first and return to Delhi for continuation. Filming resumed on 5 October 2020, with the second schedule being shot at Madurai. The schedule featuring Dhanush, Khan and Dimple Hayathi was canned for 15–20 days.

In November 2020, Dhanush and Sara resumed shooting for the final schedule in Delhi. After a five-day shoot in Delhi, the team moved to Greater Noida on 29 November 2020. Major part of movie was filmed at University of Delhi's Gwyer Hall. A sequence featuring the lead actors, were shot at the outdoors of Sharda University with the students and locals featuring as extras. On 4 December, Akshay Kumar joined the shooting for the film at the location after completing the shooting for Bell Bottom (2021). The filming continued at Delhi NCR, with the lead actors participating the schedule for 25 days in and around Delhi. On 21 December, the team shifted to shoot few sequences at Agra; several sequences featuring the lead cast were shot at the Taj Mahal, including, one with a song shoot featuring Akshay. An estimate 150 people were gathered for the scene. Later, few sequences were being shot at Ghatia Market. On 29 December, Dhanush had completed shooting for his portions of the film. In March 2021, a seven-day shooting schedule took place in Mumbai, with the other lead actors joining the schedule. Filming was completed by 27 March 2021.

== Soundtrack ==
The original soundtrack and film score to Atrangi Re was composed by A. R. Rahman, in his first major album composition for a T-Series Films production as well as Cape Of Good Films production, with lyrics written by Irshad Kamil. Rahman, who would compose a second time for a feature film starring Kumar since Blue (2009), said that he created the soundtrack with the on-screen and off-screen personas of the lead actors in mind. He further curated the songs and score with Rai's vision on bringing villages to life and offering an international perspective. As a result, he worked on folk-classical based compositions for the film's songs. The music reflects the moods and sentiments of the characters as the film plot travels across India.

The songs "Chaka Chak" and "Rait Zara Si" were released as singles, before the seven-song soundtrack album being released by T-Series on 6 December 2021. The release coincided with a promotional launch event held in Mumbai with the attendance of the cast and crew, and a musical concert by Rahman and his team. The album received positive response with Financial Express summed up several critics' reviews, calling the soundtrack "heart-touching music rendered by veteran music composer A. R. Rahman". Rahman won IIFA Awards for Best Music Director and Best Background Score.

== Release ==
The film was earlier set for a theatrical release on Valentine's Day (14 February 2021), as per the official announcement of the film. However, production delays due to the COVID-19 lockdown in India forced the makers to postpone the release to 6 August 2021. It did not release, as planned, due to the uncertainty prevailing over the reopening of theatres in Maharashtra. In September 2021, it was reported that the film might have a direct-to-digital release, despite the resumption of theatrical business in Maharashtra from October 2021. Akshay Kumar also hinted the possibilities of it, citing the saturation of big-budget theatrical release might impacts its collections, and further said that: "The film has a different subject and storyline, which has never been heard before. For me and Rai, the most suited platform must be chosen for the film." In mid-November 2021, the producers announced that the film will have a digital release through Disney+ Hotstar on the occasion of Christmas Eve (24 December 2021). The film was also dubbed in Tamil and released under the title Galatta Kalyaanam, and Sara Ali Khan's and Akshay Kumar's voice in the Tamil version was dubbed by popular playback singers Chinmayi and Mano respectively. The title of the Tamil version was taken from Sivaji Ganesan's 1968 film of the same name. The Tamil-version of the film was also released on the same day.

== Reception ==
=== Audience viewership ===
According to a survey report, more than 28 million households have watched the film, making it the most viewed content on a digital platform during the week of 20–26 December 2021. The film garnered the highest opening day viewership in their streaming service, thereby breaking the viewership records of Laxmii (2020), Hungama 2 and Shiddat (2021).

=== Critical response ===
In his review for Filmfare, Devesh Sharma gave a verdict, "an unusual love story buoyed by some fine performances and hummable music. Aanand L Rai has found his rhythm again with this entertaining film which also packs a message." He assigned the film 3.5 stars (out of 5). In her review for the Hindustan Times, Monika Kukreja stated it as "a refreshingly different and unique love story that so beautifully breaks through the clutter". Critics based at Bollywood Hungama gave the film 3 stars out of 5. They said, "On the whole, the film rests on a very unconventional plot. But it addresses a pertinent topic, that is, mental health which is tackled with sensitivity. Also, the performances, the musical score and several well-executed scenes turn the film into a watchable fare." Hiren Kotwani, in his review for The Times of India gave 3.5 out of 5 stars, he wrote, "While there are parts of the movie that will leave you baffled and curious for more details, it's not to say that the film doesn't entirely entertain. Here's a unique story at hand, an interesting team of actors, a refreshing soundtrack and some fine performances." Prateek Sur of Outlook Magazine, stated, "The twist is the triangular love story is what makes it worth a watch". Sukanya Verma of Rediff.com gave 3 stars (out of 5) to the film saying, "Between its glamorous state of denial, hastily concocted back stories, dubious scientific solutions, Om Shanti Om-esque high drama of a climax and a zigzag love story, Atrangi Re is as fascinating as it is foolhardy."

Manohar Basu while reviewing the film for Mid-Day, assigned 2.5 stars out of 5, saying, "Atrangi Re is ridiculous. It is mind bogglingly frustrating, especially in the first hour, due to its disjointed and contrived plot [...] While admire Rai's courage to attempt a complex film that's so out-of-the-box. But what his film lacks is an in-depth understanding of mental health disorders — schizophrenia, bipolar disorder, which in 2021 is both ignorant and unacceptable." Avinash Ramachandran of The New Indian Express wrote, "Atrangi Re too deals with an all-encompassing love that crosses all physical and mental boundaries. Just like all their films, the concept too is a fascinating one even if it borders on the old-fashioned [...] However, despite a solid cast, brilliant music, and spectacular visuals, this time around the successful collaboration misses the target by quite a distance." He awarded the film 2.5 out of 5 stars. Saibal Chatterjee of NDTV awarded the film a score of 2 stars (out of 5) stating, "Atrangi Re, demands an unconscionable degree of willing suspension of disbelief as is it lets go off all semblance of logic. The contrived storyline is intended to tug at our heartstrings — all it does is lurch from one difficult-to-digest situation to another to establish the depth of Rinku's love for Sajjad and the strength of Vishu's resolve in a 'unique' love triangle that for the most part goes round in baffling and tedious circles."

Anupama Chopra of Film Companion wrote, "The story takes unexpected turns. It hopscotches across the country and touches on myriad subjects, while the film is about the transformative power of love. Aanand and Himanshu celebrate the purity of the emotion and the beauty in being atrangi or eccentric. The ambition is laudable but the result is a bit of a mess." Rahul Desai, writing for the same website, panned the film, saying, "The film is the kind of bewildering disaster that nearly turns failure into an artform." Shubhra Gupta of The Indian Express stated, "The film was meant to be a meaningful magical mystery tour, but ends up as a misfire". Anuj Kumar of The Hindu wrote, "In a bid to move beyond the obvious, director Aanand L Rai has bloated a beautiful little thought into a contrived mess, along with a disturbing depiction of mental illness. Even Dhanush can't save this weird take on love." In his review for Mint, Uday Bhatia stated the film as "messy and incoherent, which boldly goes to places it has no idea how to escape from".

== Accolades ==
Year	Award	Category	Nominee(s)	Result	Ref.
2022	67th Filmfare Awards	Best Actor	Dhanush	Nominated	
2022	67th Filmfare Awards	Best Music Director	A. R. Rahman	Nominated	
2022	67th Filmfare Awards	Best Lyricist	Irshad Kamil for "Rait Zara Si"	Nominated	
2022	67th Filmfare Awards	Best Male Playback Singer	Arijit Singh for "Rait Zara Si"	Nominated	
2022	67th Filmfare Awards	Best Female Playback Singer	Shreya Ghoshal for "Chaka Chak"	Nominated	
2022	67th Filmfare Awards	Best Choreography	Vijay Ganguly for "Chaka Chak"	Won	
