= Saaheb =

1985 Indian film

- Poster
- Directed by: Anil Ganguly
- Written by: Madan Joshi (dialogue)
- Screenplay by: Sachin Bhowmik
- Story by: Ranjan Roy
- Produced by: Raj Valia
- Starring: Anil Kapoor; Amrita Singh; Raakhee; Deven Verma; Utpal Dutt
- Narrated by: Shilpa Pednekar
- Cinematography: P. Subedar
- Edited by: Waman Bhonsle; Gurudutt Shirali
- Music by: Bappi Lahiri
- Release date: 31 January 1985
- Running time: 150 minutes
- Country: India
- Language: Hindi

Saaheb (transl. Sir) is a 1985 Indian Hindi-language drama film directed by Anil Ganguly. It is a remake of the 1981 Bengali film Saheb directed by Bijoy Bose, Starring Tapas Paul and Utpal Dutt. The film stars Anil Kapoor, Amrita Singh, Raakhee, Deven Verma, Utpal Dutt, Biswajit, Vijay Arora, A. K. Hangal and Dilip Dhawan. The music was composed by Bappi Lahiri. The plot follows Saaheb, the youngest son of a family, who is focused on football. Due to this, everyone in the family constantly tells him he is no good. However, when circumstances demand, he gives up his kidney to fund his sister's marriage, at the cost of his football career.

== Plot ==
Retired Badri Prasad Sharma lives with his sons and their family. His younger son Sunil aka Saheb and daughter Gulti are the only one not married. Saheb is a Goal Keeper and football is his passion. But he is demotivated all the time by his brothers and their wives. Only person who understands him is his elder sister in law Sujata with whom he shares a motherly bond. Saheb meets Natasha aka Nikki and both fall in love. Badri Prasad faces financial trouble as he needs 50,000 for marriage of Gulti and none of his sons put a helping though they are earning well. He finally decides to sell his house to arrange the expenses. Saheb cant see his father breaking down and selling ancestral house. He comes across the news that a rich businessman Sinha requires a kidney donor for his son and willing to pay any amount to the donor. Saheb decides to donate his kidney knowing that he will never be able to play football again.

== Soundtrack ==
Anjaan wrote all the lyrics.

The song "Yaar Bina Chain Kahan Re" has been recreated twice, first time for 2014 film Main Aur Mr. Riight and second time for the 2020 film Shubh Mangal Zyada Saavdhan.

Song	Singer
"Kya Khabar Kya Pata"	Kishore Kumar
"Chalte Chale Laharon Ke Saath"	Kishore Kumar
"Tukur Tukur Pyar Karoongi" - 1	Asha Bhosle
"Tukur Tukur Pyar Karoongi" - 2	Asha Bhosle
"Yaar Bina Chain Kahan Re, Pyar Bina Chain Kahan Re"	Bappi Lahiri, S. Janaki
"Jawan Hai Dil, Jawan Hain Hum"	S. Janaki

== Accolades ==
- Filmfare Best Supporting Actor Award – Nominated - Utpal Dutt
  1986 Saaheb – Badri Prasad Sharma
