= Filmfare Award for Best Choreography =

Indian film award

Filmfare Award for Choreography
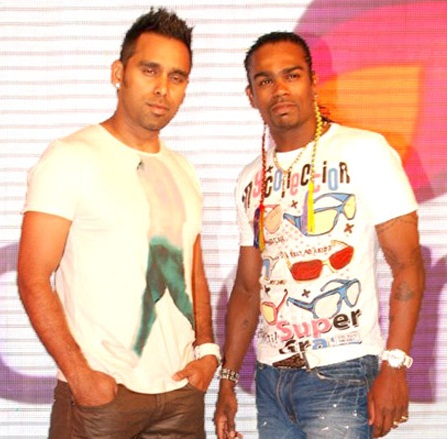
- The 2025 recipient: Bosco–Caesar
- Awarded for: Best Performance by a Choreographer
- Country: India
- Presented by: Filmfare
- First award: Saroj Khan, "Ek Do Teen Char"; Tezaab (1989)
- Currently held by: Bosco–Caesar "Tauba Tauba"; Bad Newz (2024)
- Website: Filmfare Awards

The Filmfare Award For Best Choreography is given by the Filmfare magazine as part of its annual Filmfare Awards for Hindi films.

Although the awards started in 1954, the best choreography category did not start until 1989.

Saroj Khan has a record 8 wins in this category, followed by Farah Khan with 7 wins. Saroj Khan was also the first recipient of this award in 1989.

Saroj Khan also holds the record of winning the award consecutively for 3 years making a hattrick at the Filmfare Awards in 1989, 1990 and 1991.

Madhuri Dixit has performed to 6 winning songs including Ghar More Pardesiya from 2019 Kalank movie. Deepika Padukone, Alia Bhatt and Hrithik Roshan have performed to 4 winning songs each. Aishwarya Rai has performed to 3 winning songs. Katrina Kaif has performed to 2 winning songs.

== Multiple wins ==
The following individuals have received two or more Best Choreography awards:

| Wins | Choreographer |
|---|---|
| 8 | Saroj Khan |
| 7 | Farah Khan |
| 4 | Bosco–Caesar |
| 3 | Chinni Prakash |
| 2 | Ahmed Khan, Ganesh Acharya, Vijay Ganguly, Kruti Mahesh |

== Awards ==
Here is a list of the award winners and the films for which they won.

| Year | Choreographer | Song | Film |
|---|---|---|---|
| 2025 | Bosco–Caesar | Tauba Tauba | Bad Newz |
| 2024 | Ganesh Acharya | What Jhumka? | Rocky Aur Rani Kii Prem Kahaani |
| 2023 | Kruti Mahesh | Dholida | Gangubai Kathiawadi |
| 2022 | Vijay Ganguly | Chaka Chak | Atrangi Re |
| 2021 | Farah Khan | Dil Bechara | Dil Bechara |
| 2020 | Remo D'Souza | Ghar More Paradesiya | Kalank |
| 2019 | Kruti Mahesh & Jyothi D Tommar | Ghoomar | Padmaavat |
| 2018 | Vijay Ganguly & Ruel Dausan Varindani | Galti Se Mistake | Jagga Jasoos |
| 2017 | Aadil Sheikh | Kar Gayi Chull | Kapoor and Sons |
| 2016 | Pandit Birju Maharaj | Mohe Rang Do Laal | Bajirao Mastani |
| 2015 | Ahmed Khan | Jumme Ki Raat | Kick |
| 2014 | Samir & Arsh Tanna | Lahu Muh Lag Gaya | Goliyon Ki Raasleela Ram-Leela |
| 2013 | Bosco-Caesar | Aunty Ji | Ek Main Aur Ekk Tu |
| 2012 | Bosco-Caesar | Senorita | Zindagi Na Milegi Dobara |
| 2011 | Farah Khan | Sheila Ki Jawani | Tees Mar Khan |
| 2010 | Bosco-Caesar | Chor Bazaari | Love Aaj Kal |
| 2009 | Longinus Fernandes | Pappu Can't Dance | Jaane Tu Ya Jaane Na |
| 2008 | Saroj Khan | Barso Re | Guru |
| 2007 | Ganesh Acharya | Beedi | Omkara |
| 2006 | Howard Rosemeyer | Kaisi Paheli Zindagani | Parineeta |
| 2005 | Prabhu Deva | Main Aisa Kyun Hoon | Lakshya |
| 2004 | Farah Khan | Idhar Chala Main Udhar Chala | Koi... Mil Gaya |
| 2003 | Saroj Khan | Dola Re Dola | Devdas |
| 2002 | Farah Khan | Woh Ladki Hai Kahaan | Dil Chahta Hai |
| 2001 | Farah Khan | Ek Pal Ka Jeena | Kaho Naa... Pyaar Hai |
| 2000 | Saroj Khan | Nimbooda | Hum Dil De Chuke Sanam |
| 1999 | Farah Khan | Chaiyya Chaiyya | Dil Se.. |
| 1998 | Farah Khan | Dhol Bajne Laga | Virasat |
| 1997 | Chinni Prakash | Sheher Ki Ladki | Rakshak |
| 1996 | Ahmed Khan | Rangeela Re | Rangeela |
| 1995 | Chinni Prakash | Tu Cheez Badi Hai Mast | Mohra |
| 1994 | Saroj Khan | Choli Ke Peeche Kya Hai | Khalnayak |
| 1993 | Saroj Khan | Dhak Dhak Karne Laga | Beta |
| 1992 | Chinni Prakash | Jumma Chumma De De | Hum |
| 1991 | Saroj Khan | Humko Aaj Kal Hai Intezaar | Sailaab |
| 1990 | Saroj Khan | Na Jaane Kahan Se Aayi Hai | Chaalbaaz |
| 1989 | Saroj Khan | Ek Do Teen Char | Tezaab |

== See also ==
- Filmfare Awards
- Bollywood
- Cinema of India
