= Jagga Jasoos =

2017 Indian film by Anurag Basu

- Theatrical release poster
- Directed by: Anurag Basu
- Written by: Screenplay: Anurag Basu; Dialogues in Rhyme: Amitabh Bhattacharya; Anurag Basu; Devesh Kapoor; Samrat Chakraborty; Debatma Mandal; Dialogues: Samrat Chakraborty
- Story by: Anurag Basu
- Produced by: Siddharth Roy Kapur; Anurag Basu; Ranbir Kapoor
- Starring: Ranbir Kapoor; Katrina Kaif; Saswata Chatterjee; Saurabh Shukla; Sayani Gupta; Ivan Sylvester Rodrigues
- Cinematography: Ravi Varman
- Edited by: Ajay Sharma
- Music by: Pritam
- Production companies: Walt Disney Pictures; Picture Shuru Entertainment
- Distributed by: UTV Motion Pictures
- Release date: 14 July 2017
- Running time: 162 minutes
- Country: India
- Language: Hindi
- Budget: ₹131 crore
- Box office: ₹86.85 crore

Jagga Jasoos (transl. Detective Jagga) is a 2017 Indian Hindi-language musical adventure comedy film written and directed by Anurag Basu, and produced by Siddharth Roy Kapur, Basu and Ranbir Kapoor. It stars Kapoor and Katrina Kaif, and tells the story of a teenage detective in search of his missing father. It was released on 14 July 2017 to mixed reviews from critics and was a box-office bomb, but bagged ten nominations at the 63rd Filmfare Awards, winning four of them for the film's music.

== Plot ==
The story of Jagga Jasoos revolves around the high-profile case of Purulia Arms Drop, which took place in 1995 allegedly to overthrow the then Communist Government of West Bengal, India. Jagga, a curious and shy young boy in a quaint little town lives a happy life with his accident-prone adoptive father, Badal Bagchi. Jagga, being self-conscious of his stammer, doesn't speak much. One day, Bagchi teaches him to "speak" in song. Sometime later, after admitting Jagga into a boarding school, Bagchi suddenly disappears. Feeling abandoned, Jagga's only contact with Bagchi is a VHS tape that he receives in the mail every year on his birthday. Armed with sharp detective skills, Jagga sets out to solve the mystery of his missing parent. Along the way, he finds a partner Shruti Sengupta, an accident-prone journalist with her own international criminal case to solve. Using a few tricks he learnt from Bagchi, Jagga, along with Shruti, embarks on a mission to uncover the details of his father's mysterious secret life and finds himself embroiled in a worldwide smuggling racket. The film later ends on a cliffhanger as it shows Jagga and his father on a cruise ship having been captured by the Two-Headed Bashir Alexander.

== Cast ==
- Ranbir Kapoor as Jagga Rana Bagchi
  - Saravajeet Tiwari as Junior Jagga
- Katrina Kaif as Shruti Sengupta
- Saswata Chatterjee as Badal Bagchi, Jagga's guardian whom he calls TutiFuti.
- Kiran Srinivas as Akash, Shruti's boyfriend (photographic appearance)
- Chitrak Bandyopadhyay as Debu
- Sayani Gupta as Little girl
- Saurabh Shukla as Ex-IB Officer Kishan Pal Sinha
- Ivan Rodrigues as Ahuja, Mining Tycoon
- Rajatava Dutta as Inspector Ratikant Palit
- Denzil Smith as a terrorist
- Mir Sarwar as a shooter
- Bijou Thaangjam
- Nawazuddin Siddiqui in a cameo appearance as 2-Headed Bashir Alexander
- Anurag Basu in a cameo
- Amey Pandya in cameo

== Production ==
Filming took place in Cape Town, South Africa. Reports from Cape Town were that the real-world romance of Kapoor and Kaif was falling apart and occasional arguments between the two caused some delays and resulted in scenes not having the impact intended by Basu. By 20 March 2014, Basu had completed 20 days of filming with his leads and, being unhappy with initial efforts by Kapoor, intended to use the additional schedule time to re-shoot some scenes. Kapoor was simultaneously shooting for Anurag Kashyap's Bombay Velvet and Imtiaz Ali's Tamasha. Basu explained, "We've to shoot Jagga Jasoos during the gaps in the shooting of Bombay Velvet. We completed one schedule. Now we'll go into a lengthy schedule from August. By the end of the year the shooting would be complete."

Govinda was initially scheduled to appear in the film for a special appearance. He even travelled to South Africa to shoot some outdoor sequences. However, later during film's post-production his entire role was trimmed from the final theatrical cut. Later, Kapoor apologised and stated that the film had started prematurely without a complete script resulting in significant changes to Govinda's character and his eventual removal from the entire film track.

The film was originally going to release on 27 November 2015, but the film's release date was pushed to April 2017.

It was reportedly made as part of a franchise with further sequels planned, as also indicated by the film's open ending, but after a poor box office performance these plans were reportedly shelved.

== Soundtrack ==
The film is a musical and has a total of 29 songs which are part of a narrative. Ranbir Kapoor sang most of his dialogues rather than saying them. T-Series released the film soundtrack album. Tushar Joshi sung the songs Musafir & Khaana Khaake in this movie.

== Release ==
The film was released on 14 July 2017 worldwide. A sneak peek of the film was released on 19 December 2016. The movie earned around 331.7 million in its first weekend.

== Reception ==
=== Box office ===
Jagga Jasoos proved to be a box office bomb.

=== Critical reception ===
Jagga Jasoos received mixed reviews from film critics. On the review aggregator website Rotten Tomatoes, 83% of 12 critics' reviews are positive, with an average rating of 5.9/10.

Baradwaj Rangan gave a positive review, calling it "A mad, magical, parts-greater-than-sum musical that's a total treat", concluding his review with "Anurag Basu has made a right-brain movie. I’m not sure it can be defended logically, and I’m not sure I care when the result is so mad, so magical.". Namrata Joshi of The Hindu called the film "A comic book swamped with music", observing that "Basu is aiming at reaching out to the children and the kid in every adult" while also noting the "Broadway musical format" of the film and the "distant, exotic" locations, saying "Jagga Jasoos's fantasy does get fantastic". Sukanya Verma of Rediff.com rated 3.5/5 and said, "Jagga Jasoos revels in its lavish imagination, meddlesome inquiries and delicious bongness, never once pausing to catch a breath or make sense."

Conversely, Rachit Gupta of Filmfare rated the film at 2.5/5 and said,"Jagga Jasoos could not have been so much more. But it just feels like a long and winding screenplay that tries to fit in too many foolish and lavish ideas." Sarita A Tanwar of Daily News & Analysis gave a 2/5 rating and said, "Despite the novel treatment and outstanding aesthetics, this Ranbir Kapoor-Katrina Kaif film's a mistake!" Shubhra Gupta of The Indian Express gave 1.5/5 rating and said, "Trouble is, in its zeal to put together novel locations and exotic hot spots, ‘Jagga Jasoos’ forgets to give us a story. The good-looking leads are left to fend for themselves in a sinking plot."

== Awards and nominations ==
Date of ceremony	Awards	Category	Recipient(s) and nominee(s)	Result	Ref.
2 December 2017	Screen Awards	Best Choreography	Vijay Ganguly, Ruel Dausan Vrindani (for the song "Galti Se Mistake")	Nominated	
2 December 2017	Screen Awards	Best Choreography	Shiamak Davar (for the song "Ullu Ka Pattha")	Won	
2 December 2017	Screen Awards	Best Playback Singer (Male)	Arijit Singh (for the song "Galti Se Mistake") (also for Raees)	Won	
2 December 2017	Screen Awards	Best Music	Pritam	Nominated	
30 December 2017	Zee Cine Awards	Best Post Production	Ajay Sharma, NY VFXWAALA	Won	
30 December 2017	Zee Cine Awards	Best Choreography	Vijay Ganguly, Ruel Dausan Vrindani (for the song "Galti Se Mistake")	Won	
30 December 2017	Zee Cine Awards	Best Choreography	Shiamak Davar (for the song "Ullu Ka Pattha")	Nominated	
30 December 2017	Zee Cine Awards	Best Music	Pritam	Nominated	
30 December 2017	Zee Cine Awards	Song of the Year	"Galti Se Mistake"	Nominated	
20 January 2018	Filmfare Awards	Best Actor (Critics)	Ranbir Kapoor	Nominated	
20 January 2018	Filmfare Awards	Best Music Album	Pritam	Won	
20 January 2018	Filmfare Awards	Best Background Score	Pritam	Won	
20 January 2018	Filmfare Awards	Best Lyrics	Amitabh Bhattacharya (for the song "Ullu Ka Pattha")	Nominated	
20 January 2018	Filmfare Awards	Best Lyrics	Amitabh Bhattacharya (for the song "Galti Se Mistake")	Won	
20 January 2018	Filmfare Awards	Best Action	Allan Amin	Nominated	
20 January 2018	Filmfare Awards	Best Choreography	Shiamak Davar (for the song "Ullu Ka Pattha")	Nominated	
20 January 2018	Filmfare Awards	Best Choreography	Vijay Ganguly (for the song "Khaana Khaake")	Nominated	
20 January 2018	Filmfare Awards	Best Choreography	Vijay Ganguly, Ruel Dausan Vrindani (for the song "Galti Se Mistake")	Won	
20 January 2018	Filmfare Awards	Best Cinematography	S. Ravi Varman	Nominated	
28 January 2018	Mirchi Music Awards	Album of The Year	Pritam, Amitabh Bhattacharya, Neelesh Misra	Nominated	
28 January 2018	Mirchi Music Awards	Upcoming Male Vocalist of The Year	Tushar Joshi (for the song "Musafir")	Nominated	
28 January 2018	Mirchi Music Awards	Best Song Producer (Programming & Arranging)	Dj Phukan & Sunny M.R. (for the song "Ullu Ka Pattha")	Nominated	
28 January 2018	Mirchi Music Awards	Best Background Score	Pritam	Nominated	
28 January 2018	Mirchi Music Awards	Listeners' Choice Album of the Year	Pritam, Amitabh Bhattacharya, Neelesh Misra	Won	
22 June 2018	International Indian Film Academy Awards	Best Director	Anurag Basu	Nominated	
22 June 2018	International Indian Film Academy Awards	Best Actor	Ranbir Kapoor	Nominated	
22 June 2018	International Indian Film Academy Awards	Best Music Direction	Pritam	Nominated	
22 June 2018	International Indian Film Academy Awards	Best Background Score	Pritam	Won	
22 June 2018	International Indian Film Academy Awards	Best Choreography	Vijay Ganguly, Ruel Dausan Vrindani (for the song "Galti Se Mistake")	Won	
22 June 2018	International Indian Film Academy Awards	Best Special Effects	Prasad Vasant Sutar, NY VFXWAALA	Won	

== See also ==
- Fictional detectives
  - Feluda
  - Tintin
  - Byomkesh Bakshi
- Shundi, fictional kingdom featured in the film
- Heer Raanjha, a 1970 Indian film with dialogue in verse/songs (a sung-through like Jagga Jasoos)
- Jagga Jatt, namesake of the film
- Bobby Jasoos
