= Amma Pillai =

- Directed by: R. C. Sakthi
- Produced by: M. K. Raju
- Starring: Ramki; Seetha; Jaishankar; Srividya; S. S. Chandran; Kovai Sarala
- Music by: Shankar–Ganesh
- Production company: Vimala Movies
- Release date: 25 May 1990
- Country: India
- Language: Tamil

Amma Pillai is a 1990 Indian Tamil-language film, directed by R. C. Sakthi and produced by M. K. Raju. The film stars Ramki and Seetha. It is a remake of the Malayalam film Mortuary. The film was released on 25 May 1990.

== Cast ==
- Ramki
- Seetha
- Jaishankar
- Srividya
- Nassar
- Charle
- S. S. Chandran
- Kovai Sarala

== Soundtrack ==
The music was composed by Shankar–Ganesh.

Song	Singers	Lyrics	Length
"Iniya Thendrale"	SPB	Arunachalam	04:29
"Kadhai Piranthathu"	Mano, Sindhu	Kadhal Mathi	04:30
"Maalai Nerame"	Mano, Sindhu	Piraisoodan	04:43
"Malligai Pookka"	Mano, Vani Jairam	Vaali	04:36
"Naattu Pombala"	Mano, Sindhu	Gangai Amaran	05:10
"Pogum Paathai"	K. J. Yesudas	Poovai Senkuttuvan	04:30
"Sengani Indrida"	Mano, Sindhu	Vaali	04:51
"Teenage Girls"	Mano	Kadhal Mathi	04:06
"Vetri Kidaikkum"	Vani Jairam	Poovai Senkuttuvan	04:25

== Reception ==
During the obituary of R. C. Sakthi, IANS reported that the film was critically acclaimed alongside Manitharil Ithanai Nirangalah! and Dharma Yuddham.
