= 50th National Film Awards =

2003 Indian film award

- 50th National Film Awards
- Awarded for: Best of Indian cinema in 2002
- Awarded by: Directorate of Film Festivals
- Presented by: A. P. J. Abdul Kalam (President of India)
- Announced on: 26 July 2003
- Presented on: 29 December 2003
- Official website: dff.nic.in

Highlights
- Best Feature Film: Mondo Meyer Upakhyan
- Best Non-Feature Film: Narayan Gangaram Surve
- Best Book: • Paroma and other Outsiders: The Cinema of Aparna Sen • Ritu Aaye Ritu Jaaye
- Best Film Critic: Utpal Borpujari
- Dadasaheb Phalke Award: Dev Anand
- Most awards: Kannathil Muthamittal (6)

The 50th National Film Awards, presented by Directorate of Film Festivals, the organisation set up by Ministry of Information and Broadcasting, India to felicitate the best of Indian Cinema released in the year 2002.

Awards were announced by the committee headed by Prakash Jha, Rajiv Mehrotra and Udaya Tara Nayar for the feature films, non-feature films and books written on Indian cinema, respectively, on 26 July 2003; whereas the award ceremony took place on 29 December 2003 and awards were given away by then President of India, A. P. J. Abdul Kalam.

== Awards ==
Awards were divided into feature films, non-feature films and books written on Indian cinema.

=== Lifetime Achievement Award ===
Name of Award	Image	Awardee(s)	Awarded As	Awards
Dadasaheb Phalke Award		Dev Anand	Actor, director and producer	Swarna Kamal, ₹ 100,000 and a Shawl

=== Feature films ===
Feature films were awarded at All India as well as regional level. For 50th National Film Awards, a Bengali film, Mondo Meyer Upakhyan won the National Film Award for Best Feature Film; whereas a Tamil film, Kannathil Muthamittal won the maximum number of awards (6). Following were the awards given in each category:

==== Juries ====
A committee headed by Prakash Jha was appointed to evaluate the feature films awards. Following were the jury members:

- Jury Members
  - Prakash Jha (Chairperson) • Amitabh Parashar • Arun Kaul • Biju Viswanath • Biplab Roy Chowdhary • Dinyar Contractor
  - Gautam Kaul • K. S. L. Swamy • Kiran Ghai • Alex Mathew • Manoj Tiwari • Mrinal Kanti Das • Mukesh Khanna
  - Nasir Mahmood Quraishi • Nirad N. Mohapatra • Shyamaprasad • Rauf Ahmed • S. Theodore Baskaran
  - Saibal Chattopadhyay • Sreelekha Mukherji • Swapan Mallick • Zoobi Amir

==== All India Award ====
Following were the awards given:

===== Golden Lotus Award =====
Official Name: Swarna Kamal

All the awardees are awarded with 'Golden Lotus Award (Swarna Kamal)', a certificate and cash prize.

Name of Award	Name of Film	Language	Awardee(s)	Cash prize
Best Feature Film	Mondo Meyer Upakhyan	Bengali	Producer: Arya Bhattacharya director: Buddhadeb Dasgupta	₹ 50,000/- Each
Best Feature Film	Citation: For its poetic exploration of human and social realities concerning people on the fringes of society.			
Best Debut Film of a Director	Patalghar	Bengali	Producer: Niti Sonee Gourisaria; Director: Abhijit Chaudhuri	₹ 12,500/- Each
Best Debut Film of a Director	Citation: For its craftsmanship and fine blending of the conventions of science fiction and an indigenous narrative form.			₹ 12,500/- Each
Best Debut Film of a Director	Prohor	Bengali	Producer: Debjani Gupta; Director: Subhadro Chaudhary	₹ 12,500/- Each
Best Debut Film of a Director	Citation: For its use of sensitive idiom to portray the trauma of a brutalised woman.			₹ 12,500/- Each
Best Popular Film Providing Wholesome Entertainment	Devdas	Hindi	Producer: Bharat Shah; Director: Sanjay Leela Bhansali	₹ 40,000/- Each
Best Popular Film Providing Wholesome Entertainment	Citation: For its technical finesse and its modern reinterpretation of an enduring classic.			
Best Children's Film	Baaja	Hindi	Producer: Children's Film Society; Director: Apurba Kishore Bir	₹ 30,000/- Each
Best Children's Film	Citation: For its poignant, portrayal of the maturing of a young mind.			
Best Direction	Mr. and Mrs. Iyer	English	Aparna Sen	₹ 50,000/-
Best Direction	Citation: For her effective and subtle handling of people caught in a trying and difficult times.			

===== Silver Lotus Award =====
Official Name: Rajat Kamal

All the awardees are awarded with 'Silver Lotus Award (Rajat Kamal)', a certificate and cash prize.

Name of Award	Name of Film	Language	Awardee(s)	Cash prize
Best Feature Film on National Integration	Mr. and Mrs. Iyer	English	Producer: N. Venkatesan; Director: Aparna Sen	₹ 30,000/- Each
Best Feature Film on National Integration	Citation: For its humane depiction of the bonding between two individuals of different religious backgrounds in the midst of communal tension.			
Best Film on Other Social Issues	Swaraaj	Hindi	Producer: George Mathew; Director: Anwar Jamal	₹ 30,000/- Each
Best Film on Other Social Issues	Citation: For its strong and competent depiction of women's empowerment in rural India.			
Best Actor	The Legend of Bhagat Singh	Hindi	Ajay Devgn	₹ 10,000/-
Best Actor	Citation: For entering into the spirit of the legendary character and for living up to the challenge of history.			
Best Actress	Mr. and Mrs. Iyer	English	Konkona Sen Sharma	₹ 10,000/-
Best Actress	Citation: For her strong and effective portrayal of a Tamil Brahmin woman caught between an orthodox mindset and human compassion.			
Best Supporting Actor	Nanba Nanba	Tamil	V. Chandrasekhar	₹ 10,000/-
Best Supporting Actor	Citation: For his touching and absorbing portrayal of a physically challenged man.			
Best Supporting Actress	Shubho Mahurat	Bengali	Raakhee	₹ 10,000/-
Best Supporting Actress	Citation: For her finely balanced portrayal of an enigmatic and unlikely detective against a simple middle class background.			
Best Child Artist	Makdee	Hindi	Shweta Prasad	₹ 5,000/- Each
Best Child Artist	Citation: For her spontaneous and lively portrayal of twin sisters.			₹ 5,000/- Each
Best Child Artist	Kannathil Muthamittal	Tamil	P. S. Keerthana	₹ 5,000/- Each
Best Child Artist	Citation: For her heart vending portrayal of a girl in search of her mother.			₹ 5,000/- Each
Best Male Playback Singer	Zindagi Khoobsurat Hai ("Chhote Chhote Sapne")	Hindi	Udit Narayan	₹ 10,000/-
Best Male Playback Singer	Citation: For his melodious rendering of the title song.			
Best Female Playback Singer	Devdas ("Bairi Piya")	Hindi	Shreya Ghoshal	₹ 10,000/-
Best Female Playback Singer	Citation: For her soulful rendering of the song.			
Best Cinematography	Patalghar	Bengali	Cameraman: Abhik Mukhopadhyay; Laboratory Processing: Rainbow Color Lab	₹ 10,000/- Each
Best Cinematography	Citation: For creating the distinctive and elegant visual ambience of the film that is excellently in tune with the mood of the story.			
Best Screenplay	Mr. and Mrs. Iyer	English	Aparna Sen	₹ 10,000/-
Best Screenplay	Citation: For its fluid narration of the nuances of an ambiguous relationship in troubled times.			
Best Audiography	Kannathil Muthamittal	Tamil	• A. S. Laxmi Narayanan • H. Sridhar	₹ 5,000/- Each
Best Audiography	Citation: For creating a sounds cape that heightens the dramatic conflicts of the story.			
Best Editing	Kannathil Muthamittal	Tamil	A. Sreekar Prasad	₹ 10,000/-
Best Editing	Citation: For heightening the dramatic conflicts of the story.			
Best Art Direction	Devdas	Hindi	Nitin Chandrakant Desai	₹ 10,000/-
Best Art Direction	Citation: For creating an evocative visual setting for the romantic drama.			
Best Costume Design	Devdas	Hindi	• Neeta Lulla • Abu Jani • Sandeep Khosla • Reza Shariffi	₹ 10,000/-
Best Costume Design	Citation: For their researched, inventive, designing of costumes enhancing the persona of the various characters.			
Best Music Direction	Kannathil Muthamittal	Tamil	Songs and Background Score: A. R. Rahman	₹ 10,000/-
Best Music Direction	Citation: For his original musical score highlighting the cultural conflicts and personal anguish in the story.			
Best Lyrics	Kannathil Muthamittal	Tamil	Vairamuthu	₹ 10,000/-
Best Lyrics	Citation: For rising above the conventions of film songs to reach the realms of poetry.			
Best Special Effects	Magic Magic	Tamil	Indian Artists	₹ 10,000/-
Best Special Effects	Citation: For the skilful use of digital technology to create a world of fantasy and magic.			
Best Choreography	Devdas ("Dola Re Dola")	Hindi	Saroj Khan	₹ 10,000/-
Best Choreography	Citation: For her creation of captivating dance movements to reflect the spirit of the characters and the period.			
Special Jury Award	Multiple films	–	Prakash Raj (Actor)	₹ 25,000/-
Special Jury Award	Citation: For the impressive power and versatility, which he has contributed to films in multiple languages.			
Special Mention	Bhavam	Malayalam	Jyothirmayi (Actress)	Certificate Only
Special Mention	Citation: For her remarkable performance.			

==== Regional Awards ====
The award is given to best film in the regional languages in India.

Name of Award	Name of Film	Awardee(s)	Cash prize
Best Feature Film in Assamese	Konikar Ramdhenu	Producer: Sailadhar Baruah; Director: Jahnu Barua	₹ 20,000/- Each
Best Feature Film in Assamese	Citation: For its sensitive portrayal of child abuse.		
Best Feature Film in Bengali	Shubho Mahurat	Producer: Jagannath Films; Director: Rituparno Ghosh	₹ 20,000/- Each
Best Feature Film in Bengali	Citation: For its intelligent handling of characters in a detective story.		
Best Feature Film in Hindi	The Legend of Bhagat Singh	Producer: Tips Industries; Director: Rajkumar Santoshi	₹ 20,000/- Each
Best Feature Film in Hindi	Citation: For its gripping portrayal of the life and times of a legendary martyr.		
Best Feature Film in Kannada	Singaaravva	Producer: Sandesh Nagaraj; Director: T. S. Nagabharana	₹ 20,000/- Each
Best Feature Film in Kannada	Citation: For its stylised treatment of a folk tale.		
Best Feature Film in Malayalam	Nizhalkuthu	Producer: Adoor Gopalakrishnan; Director: Adoor Gopalakrishnan	₹ 20,000/- Each
Best Feature Film in Malayalam	Citation: For its exploration of the mind of a hangman.		
Best Feature Film in Marathi	Vastupurush	Producer: NFDC; Director: Sumitra Bhave and Sunil Sukthankar	₹ 20,000/- Each
Best Feature Film in Marathi	Citation: For its competent handling of a feudal family caught in the vortex of social change in post-independence India.		
Best Feature Film in Tamil	Kannathil Muthamittal	Producer: Madras Talkies; Director: Mani Ratnam	₹ 20,000/- Each
Best Feature Film in Tamil	Citation: For its superb craftsmanship and commitment to a contemporary tragedy.		

Best Feature Film in Each of the Language Other Than Those Specified in the Schedule VIII of the Constitution

Name of Award	Name of Film	Awardee(s)	Cash prize
Best Feature Film in English	Stumble	Producer: 2 Streams Media; Director: Prakash Belawadi	₹ 20,000/- Each
Best Feature Film in English	Citation: For its intelligent handling of corruption prevailing in the world of information technology.		

=== Non-Feature Films ===
Short Films made in any Indian language and certified by the Central Board of Film Certification as a documentary/newsreel/fiction are eligible for non-feature film section.

==== Juries ====
A committee headed by Rajiv Mehrotra was appointed to evaluate the non-feature films awards. Following were the jury members:

- Jury Members
  - Rajiv Mehrotra (Chairperson) • Apurba Sharma • Kanan Krishnamurthy • Satya Narayan • Satya Prakash 'Aseem'

==== Golden Lotus Award ====
Official Name: Swarna Kamal

All the awardees are awarded with 'Golden Lotus Award (Swarna Kamal)', a certificate and cash prize.

Name of Award	Name of Film	Language	Awardee(s)	Cash prize
Best Non-Feature Film	Narayan Gangaram Surve	Marathi	Producer: Khayal Trust; Director: Arun Khopkar	₹ 20,000/- Each
Best Non-Feature Film	Citation: For the innovative telling of the story of the life of the great Marathi poet juxtaposed with the evocative visualisation of his poems. The film makes brilliant use of image and metaphor as it evolves a complex and powerful narrative.			
Best Non-Feature Film Direction	A Few Things I Know About Her	English	Anjali Panjabi	₹ 10,000/- Each
Best Non-Feature Film Direction	Citation: For the film on the saint Mirabai. With rare cinematic virtuosity, she brings together different strands from the elusive Mirabai's drawing upon stories, poetry, myth and legend into a cohesive whole.			

==== Silver Lotus Award ====
Official Name: Rajat Kamal

All the awardees are awarded with 'Silver Lotus Award (Rajat Kamal)' and cash prize.

Name of Award	Name of Film	Language	Awardee(s)	Cash prize
Best First Non-Feature Film	Paramapatham	Tamil	Producer: Film and Television Institute of Tamil Nadu; Director: Prabhu Radhakrishnan	₹ 5,000/- Each
Best First Non-Feature Film	Citation: For displaying a mature control of film form and weaves a taught, powerful and short narrative fiction to tell the story of a sculptor as the unanswered questions of his life unfold.			₹ 5,000/- Each
Best First Non-Feature Film	Beyond or Within	English	Producer: P. T. M. Payyoli; Director: Vinod Mankara	₹ 5,000/- Each
Best First Non-Feature Film	Citation: For its balanced exploration through an informative documentary on the ancient occult science and practice of the controversial Mantravada.			₹ 5,000/- Each
Best Anthropological / Ethnographic Film	The Morung – Silent Witness of the Brave Wancho	English	Producer: Anthropological Survey of India; Director: Bappa Ray	₹ 10,000/- Each
Best Anthropological / Ethnographic Film	Citation: For its detailed and painstaking yet engaging documentation of The Wancho Tribe of Arunachal Pradesh. The film imaginatively tells the story of both their past and the present through its vivid account of the central role that the 'dormitory' once played in the community.			
Best Biographical Film	Meeting Manjit	English	Producer: Ina Puri; Director: Buddhadeb Dasgupta	₹ 10,000/- Each
Best Biographical Film	Citation: For making incisive use of the visual potential of cinema to give us rare insight into an artist's life, his subconscious and its articulation on canvas. The film brilliantly juxtaposes the journeys of the artist, his friend Ina and the film maker himself.			
Best Arts / Cultural Film	The Eye of the Fish – The Kalaries Of Kerala	English	Producer: Films Division; Director: Priya Krishnaswamy	₹ 10,000/- Each
Best Arts / Cultural Film	Citation: For the rich visual texture of the film on Kalarippayuttu with its simple and effective story telling powerfully counterpoints its message of the need to reject violence and war and develop a focused mind as a potent tool of self realisation.			
Best Environment / Conservation / Preservation Film	Urumattram	Tamil	Producer: G. Meenakshi Sundaram and B.Sivakumar; Director: B.Sivakumar	₹ 10,000/- Each
Best Environment / Conservation / Preservation Film	Citation: For moving short fiction that captures the depth of human emotions embodied in mans relationship to nature that nurtures him. Even as all seems lost to the family patriarch as trees must make way for a plastic factory, the grand son offers seeds of hope.			
Best Promotional Film	The Treasure in the Snow: A Film On Sikkim	English	Producer: Ministry of External Affairs and South Asia Foundation; Director: Goutam Ghose	₹ 10,000/- Each
Best Promotional Film	Citation: For its weaving of a magical cinematic spell that vividly captures the mist and mystery of the abundant natural beauty of Sikkim – its history, people and culture.			
Best Film on Social Issues	Avchetan	Hindi	Producer: Prem Matiyani for Films Division and Ministry of Social Empowerment; Director: Manisha Dwivedi	₹ 10,000/- Each
Best Film on Social Issues	Citation: For its sensitive and direct portrayal of the predicaments and crisis of homosexuality both for the individual and his family. The short film powerfully covers a large canvas bringing together a team of outstanding new talent from the FTII led by Manisha Diwedi.			
Best Short Fiction Film	Sunder Jibon	Bengali	Producer: Satyajit Ray Film and Television Institute; Director: Sandeep Chattopadhyay	₹ 10,000/- Each
Best Short Fiction Film	Citation: For its sensitive and nuanced story about a writer and the sour taste of beauty. The film is notable for its technical excellence and the excellent synergy created by the young director Sandip Chattopadhyay and his colleagues from the Satyajit Ray Film and Television Institute in Calcutta. This award applauds them all.			
Best Film on Family Welfare	Dhatri Panna	Hindi	Producer: Films Division and Ministry of Health and Family Welfare; Director: Gul Bahar Singh	₹ 10,000/- Each
Best Film on Family Welfare	Citation: For its success in the simple yet difficult art of cinematic story telling with an important and explicit message for its rural audience, of how the tradition of the village dai can and must give way to the trained midwife.			
Best Editing	00:00	English	Pratap P Nair	₹ 10,000/-
Best Editing	Citation: For its intelligent and engaging use of cinematic form and structure as it weaves itself in and out of hotel rooms and people's lives on New Year's Eve at a sea-side hotel.			
Best Music Direction	Kalighat Paintings And Drawings	English	Raja Mitra	₹ 10,000/-
Best Music Direction	Citation: For a simple yet engaging music track that brings alive the Kalighat paintings in the film of the same title.			
Special Jury Award	00:00	English	Wrik Basu and team (Director)	₹ 10,000/-
Special Jury Award	Citation: For its intelligent and engaging use of cinematic form and structure as it weaves itself in and out of hotel rooms and people's lives on New Year's Eve at a sea-side hotel.			
Special Mention	Kalighat Paintings And Drawings	English	Raja Mitra (Director)	Certificate Only
Special Mention	Citation: For its significant achievement in documenting the rich artistic tradition and its implicit social commentary.			

=== Best Writing on Cinema ===
The awards aim at encouraging study and appreciation of cinema as an art form and dissemination of information and critical appreciation of this art-form through publication of books, articles, reviews etc.

==== Juries ====
A committee headed by Udaya Tara Nayar was appointed to evaluate the writing on Indian cinema. Following were the jury members:

- Jury Members
  - Udaya Tara Nayar (Chairperson) • Om Thanvi • Rashmi Doraiswamy

==== Golden Lotus Award ====
Official Name: Swarna Kamal

All the awardees are awarded with 'Golden Lotus Award (Swarna Kamal)' and cash prize.

Name of Award	Name of Book	Language	Awardee(s)	Cash prize
Best Book on Cinema	Paroma and other Outsiders: The Cinema of Aparna Sen	English	Author: Shoma Chatterjee; Publisher: Parumita Publications	₹ 15,000/- Each
Best Book on Cinema	Citation: For her painstaking work and thought-provoking study of the works of Aparna Sen with a clear focus on their socio-economic relevance and context.			₹ 15,000/- Each
Best Book on Cinema	Ritu Aaye Ritu Jaaye	Hindi	Author: Sarat Dutt; Publisher: Saaransh Publications Pvt. Ltd.	₹ 15,000/- Each
Best Book on Cinema	Citation: For a biography of a trend-setting music director, the late Anil Biswas, whose life story encompasses not just his personal struggles and achievements but also the scenario of Hindi film music when it was at its creative best.			₹ 15,000/- Each
Best Film Critic		English	Utpal Borpujari	₹ 15,000/-
Best Film Critic	Citation: For his sensitive analysis of a wide range of films – Indian, foreign, feature and documentary – and his attempt to focus on social issues and changing family mores and values.			

==== Special Mention ====
All the award winners are awarded with Certificate of Merit.

Name of Award	Language	Awardee(s)	Cash prize
Special Mention (Film Critic)	Marathi	Ashok Rane	Certificate Only
Special Mention (Film Critic)	Citation: For his objective evaluation of trends in cinema in India as well as abroad.		

=== Awards not given ===
Following were the awards not given as no film was found to be suitable for the award:

- Best Film on Family Welfare
- Best Film on Environment / Conservation / Preservation
- Best Feature Film in Manipuri
- Best Feature Film in Oriya
- Best Feature Film in Punjabi
- Best Feature Film in Telugu
- Best Scientific Film
- Best Agricultural Film
- Best Historical Reconstruction / Compilation Film
- Best Educational / Motivational / Instructional Film
- Best Exploration / Adventure Film
- Best Investigative Film
- Best Animation Film
- Best Non-Feature Film Cinematography
- Best Non-Feature Film Audiography
