= G. Nammalvar =

Indian agronomist

G. Nammazhvar
- Nammalvar
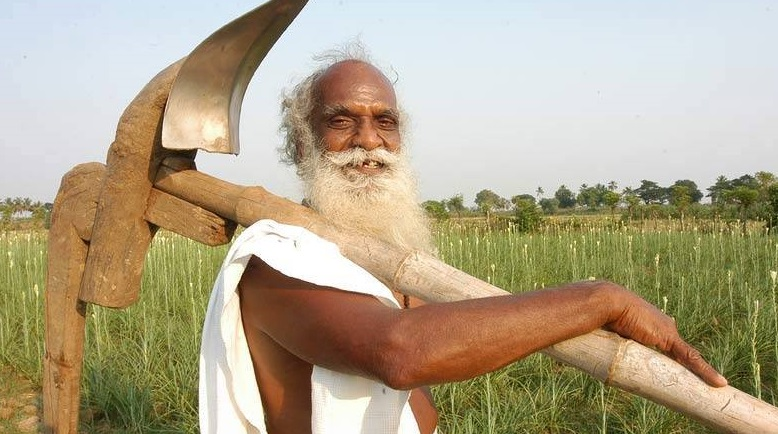
- Born: 6 April 1938; Elangadu, Thanjavur district, British Raj (present-day Tamil Nadu, India)
- Died: 30 December 2013 (aged 75)
- Resting place: Vanagam, Karur, Tamil Nadu
- Other name: organic scientist
- Education: Annamalai University
- Occupations: Agriculturist, Green Crusader, Ecological Activist
- Known for: Organic farming activism
- Spouse: Savithri Nammalvar
- Children: Meena
- Website: Vanagam - Nammalvar Ecological Foundation

G. Nammazhvar (6 April 1938 – 30 December 2013) was an Indian green crusader, agricultural scientist, environmental activist and organic farming expert best known for his work on spreading ecological farming and organic farming. He led the protest against the methane gas project started by Great Eastern Energy Corporation proposed in the Cauvery delta region of Tamil Nadu. Nammazhvar was the author of several Tamil and English books on natural farming, natural pesticides & natural fertilizers and was featured in magazines & television programs.

== Life ==
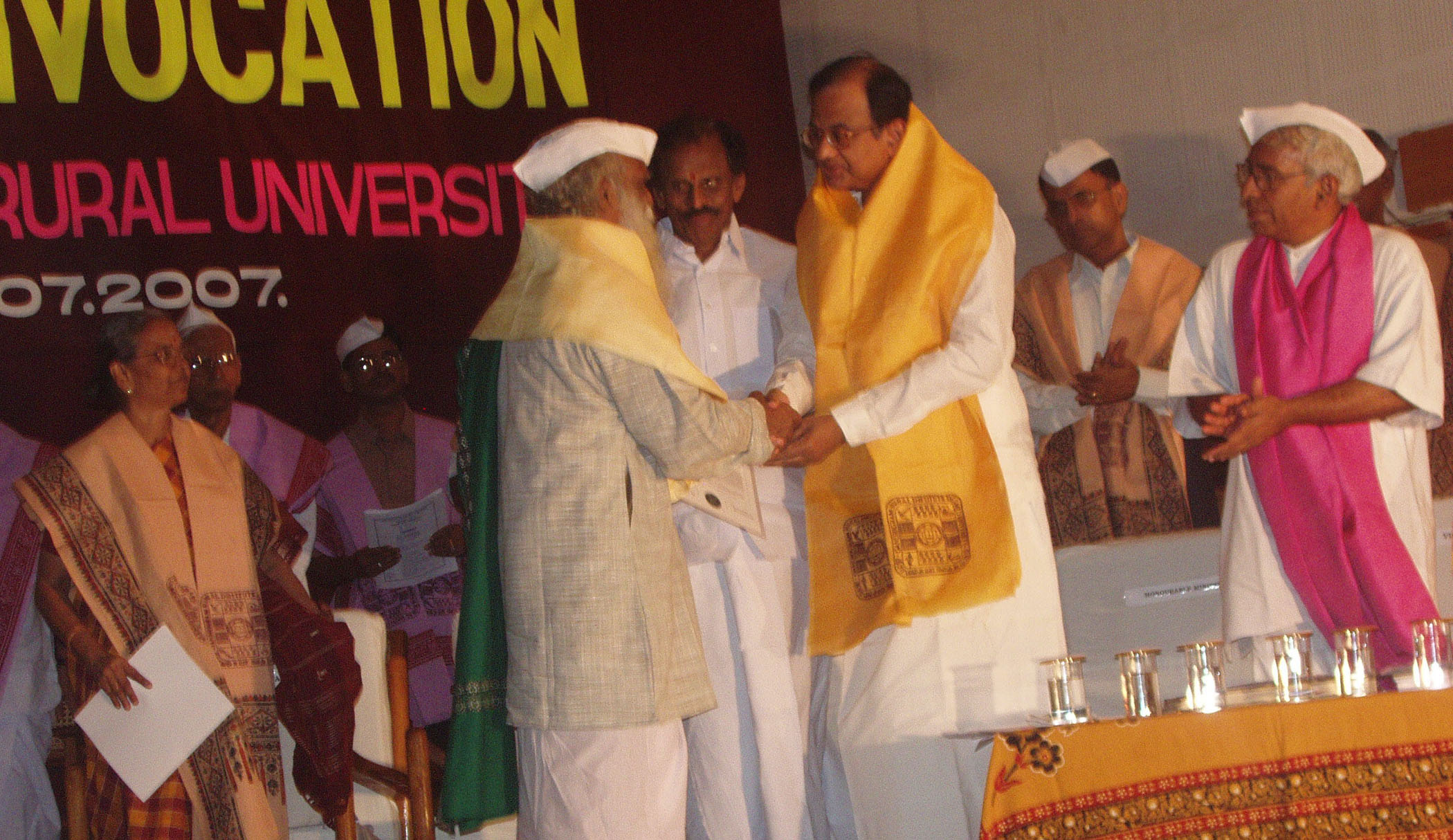
P. Chidambaram conferring Honoris Causa (Doctor of Science) to Nammalvar at the 25th Convocation of Gandhigram Rural University, Gandhigram, Tamil Nadu on July 09, 2007

Nammazhvar was born in 1938 to S. Govindasamy Parpurattiyaar in the village of Elangadu in Thanjavur District, Tamil Nadu in a Kallar (Thevar) family. He graduated from Annamalai University with a BSc degree in agriculture. In 1963, he began working for the Agricultural Regional Research Station, a government organisation in Kovilpatti, as a scientist, conducting trials on spacing and manure levels of various chemical fertilizers in cotton and millet crops. During his tenure there, the government had conducted various experiments in rain fed land, using expensive inputs like hybrid seeds, chemical fertilizers and chemical pesticides which Nammazhvar considered futile as the rain fed farmers were resource poor. Based on his experience, he felt very strongly that it was imperative to totally reorient the research work being undertaken. But his peers at the institute paid little attention to his advice. Frustrated, he left the institute.

For the next 10 years, he was an agronomist for Islands of Peace, an organisation founded by the Nobel Laureate Dominique Pire. His focus was on improving the standard of living through agricultural development in the Kalakad block of Tirunelveli District, Tamil Nadu. It was at this time that he realized that in order to get optimal results in farming, farmers should rely only minimally on external inputs. All inputs should come from within the farm. So-called wastes should be recycled and used as input. This revelation was a turning point in his life. He completely lost trust in conventional farming practices and began experimenting with sustainable agricultural methods.

In the late 1970s, Nammazhvar became greatly influenced by Paulo Freire and Vinoba Bhave and their theories on education. The purpose of education should be freedom. Freedom is essentially self-reliance. Self-sufficiency means that one should not depend on others for one's daily bread. Secondly, one should have developed the power to acquire knowledge for oneself. And last but not the least, a man should be able to rule himself, to control his thoughts and feelings.

Eager to propagate these new theories on education, specifically to aid farmers in becoming self-sufficient, he started a society, Kudumbam in 1979.

"Participatory Development" was the way forward. There can be no education without action. Nor can there be any action without education. Both go hand in hand. Nammazhvar interacted with local farmers, understood their needs, and based on their input, evolved farming practices suited to the local farmers.

In 1987 Nammazhvar attended a 4-week training course conducted by the ETC Foundation, Netherlands, on ecological agriculture. In 1990, he founded a network called LEISA (Low External Input and Sustainable Agriculture) to promote the concepts of ecological farming, specifically the importance of self-reliability and low external inputs. During the same year, he started an ecological research center for rain-fed cultivation in Pudukottai district.

Nammalvar was also greatly influenced by Mr Bernard de-Clerk of Auroville fame, whom he had worked with since 1984. In 1995 he was nominated as the Tamil Nadu state coordinator for ARISE (Agricultural Renewal in India for Sustainable Environment). Concurrently, Bernard was the coordinator at the national level. During his tenure he traveled widely across India promoting the principles of sustainable agriculture.

When the tsunami hit India on 26 December 2004, Nammazhvar was actively involved in the rehabilitation process. In 2005, he helped farmers across various villages in Nagapattinam district to rehabilitate. Few villages he worked were Mangaimadam, Periya Kuthagai, Therku Pothigai Nallur. In 2006, he left for Indonesia and assisted in reclaiming several farms in tsunami-affected areas.

Recognizing his extensive work in the field of agriculture, the Gandhi Gram Rural University, Dindigal honored Nammazhvar with a Doctorate of Science degree in 2007.

Nammazhvar traveled widely across the world, observed the agricultural practices in various different ecological systems and based on his findings, trained several farmers and NGO workers. He has written several books and articles in the Tamil language. He had a wide readership across different sections of society. His works may soon be translated to the English language, making his writings easily accessible.

Nammazhvar spent a substantial part of his time actively touring the south and conducting training classes on ecological farming. He was in the process of setting up several research cum training centers across South India. The first was at Surumanpatti, Kadavur in Karur district. He was also actively involved in linking different farms and institutes around the world so as to accelerate the process of ecological development.

He led the Historic Protest against The Methane Gas project which was Started by Great Eastern Energy Corporation an American multinational. The project was proposed in the Fertile Cauvery Delta region of Tamil Nadu which is a major agricultural region providing food resources for the majority of Tamil Nadu. Nammazhvar was the Chief Guest for the practical session conducted on organic farming titled "iniyellam iyarkai" (Now all natural) on 20–21 July 2013 by the Ramanathapuram district collector.

== Participated in ==
- Movement against the use Chemical Pesticides
- Movement against Methane extraction in Tamil Nadu
- Movement against the introduction of Bt brinjal in India
- Movement against the consumption of beef and Trafficking of Cows to Kerala

== Forming Vanagam ==
Nammazhvar founded Nammazhvar Ecological Foundation For Farm Research and Global Food Security Trust (NEFFFRGFST) or simply Vanagam to create public awareness about the benefits of Organic Farming and about the dangers and difficulties faced in traditional farming practices. Vanagam is located in Karur, Tamil Nadu.

== Death ==
Nammazhvar died on 30 December 2013, near Pattukottai, due to age-related ailments. He was on a trip to protest against methane programme (ONGC) that he had been opposing for a long time.

== Bibliography ==
Books by Dr. G. Nammazhvar
No.	Title In Tamil	Title In English	Currently Published By
1	உழவுக்கும் உண்டு வரலாறு	Ulavukkum undu Varalaru (there is also a history behind farming)	
2	எந்நாடுடைய இயற்கையே போற்றி	Ennaadudaya Iyarkaye Potri (Hail to my motherland's nature)	
3	இனி எல்லாம் இயற்கையே	Ini Ellam Iyarkaiye (Here onward it's nature)	
4	தாய் மண்	Thai Mann (Motherland)	Vanagam Publication
5	தாய் மண்ணே வணக்கம்	Thaimanne Vanakkam (Greetings to my motherland)	Vanagam Publication
6	இனி விதைகளே பேராயுதம்	Ini Vithaigale Perayutham (Seeds are the weapons of the future)	Vanagam Publication
7	பூமித்தாயே	Boomiththaye (Mother Earth)	Vanagam Publication
8	விதையிலிருந்து துளிர்க்கும் மாறுதல்	Vithaiyilirunthu Thulirkkum Maruthal (A change begotten from seeds)	Vanagam Publication
9	வயிற்றுக்கு சோறிடல் வேண்டும்	Vayittrukku Choridal Vendum	Vanagam Publication
10	நோயினைக் கொண்டாடுவோம்	Noyinai Kondaaduvom (Celebrate diseases)	Vanagam Publication
11	ஏன் வேண்டும் இயற்கை உழவாண்மை	En Vendum Iyarkai Uzhavanmai (Why do we need natural farming?)	Vanagam Publication
12	உழவுக்கு வந்தனம்	Uzhavukku vandhanam	Vanagam Publication
13	உழவும் உணவும்	Uzhavum unavum	Vanagam Publication
14	இயற்கை வேளாண்மை	Iyarkai Velanmai	Vanagam Publication
15	ஆயிரம் பேரை தேடுகிறேன்	Aayiram perai thedukiren	Vanagam Publication

== Filmography ==
Year	Film	Notes
2002	Urumattram	National Film Award for Best Non-Feature Environment/Conservation/Preservation Film
