= Siksha (film) =

- Theatrical release poster
- Directed by: Relangi Narasimha Rao
- Written by: Aatreya (dialogues)
- Story by: Anuradha Ramanan
- Based on: Sirai (1984)
- Produced by: Sashi Bhushan
- Starring: Suhasini Maniratnam; Sarath Babu
- Cinematography: S. Gopal Reddy
- Music by: K. V. Mahadevan
- Production company: Sarathi Studios
- Distributed by: AVM Productions
- Release date: 12 July 1985
- Country: India
- Language: Telugu

Siksha (transl. Punishment) is a 1985 Indian Telugu-language drama film directed by Relangi Narasimha Rao and starring Suhasini Maniratnam and Sarath Babu. The film was a remake of 1984 Tamil film Sirai.

== Cast ==
- Suhasini Maniratnam as Bhagyalakshmi
- Sarath Babu as George Prasad
- Chandra Mohan
- Rajani
- Rajesh as Krishna
- Satyanarayana as Atmanandam
- P. L. Narayana as Munasubu
- Padmanabham as Karanam
- Sutti Veerabhadra Rao
- Dubbing Janaki
- Master Ali

== Soundtrack ==
The soundtrack is composed by K. V. Mahadevan.

All lyrics are written by Acharya Aatreya.

Track listing
No.	Title	Singer(s)	Length
1.	"Paduthu Vuntanu"	P. Susheela	5:01
2.	"Erraga Burraga"	Vani Jairam	4:40
3.	"Naa Vyasuku"	S. P. Balasubrahmanyam, P. Susheela	4:25
4.	"Vidhi Pagalesina"	K. J. Yesudas	3:44
Total length:			17:50

== Reception ==
A critic from Andhra Jyothi wrote that "These days there are more films that will tear the brains of the audience! But there is a lack of movies that feed the brain! If we go deeper into this, two castes ... two religions are found. Humanity stands out as the only exception. Kudos to the producer for making a film with such a thoughtful story".

A critic from Prajasakti wrote that "In this film, the story, dialogues and background are more important. Young director Narasimha Rao Relangi has portrayed the novel of Smt. Anuradha Ramanan in a heart-wrenching manner. Especially the second half of the film leaves a big impression on the audience. This film attracts women very much".

A critic from Visalaandhra wrote that "Siksha is a film produced by an Andhra magazine based on the themes of wedding vows, wife's responsibility for their husband, their duty and their influence in society. The dialogues in the film are to be applauded in many places! Director Relangi can't just make a laugh-out-loud film... he can also make such emotional films as well!"
