= B. Sivakumar =

B. Sivakumar may refer to:

- B. Sivakumar (admiral), vice admiral of the Indian Navy currently serving as the Chief of Materiel
- B. Sivakumar (director), film director
