= Sirai =

Sirai may refer to:

- Sirai (1984 film)
- Sirai (2025 film)
