= Poovulagin Nanbargal =

Indian environmental organisation

Poovulagin Nanbargal (Friends of the Earth) is an environmental organisation based in Tamil Nadu, India. It spearheaded a legal battle against Kudankulam Nuclear Power Plant.

== History ==
Poovulagin Nanbargal started in Chennai, Tamil Nadu in the late 1980s, by the Indian Overseas Bank employee Nedunchezhiyan. He was associated with the Amnesty International India. The organisation introduced literature related to environmentalism to the Tamil language. Nedunchezhiyan died in 2006 at the age of 48. After his demise, the organisation stopped its activities. In 2008, nine men, including IT engineer G. Sundarrajan and Siddha medicine practitioner G. Sivaraman, regrouped the organisation. When the People's Movement Against Nuclear Energy (PMANE) started protests against the Kudankulam Nuclear Power Plant, Poovulagin Nanbargal gave legal support to the PMANE. To govern its activities, Poovulagin Nanbargal was registered as a public trust.

== Publication ==
Poovulagin Nanbargal has published articles about ecology, as well as about the Green Revolution in India and its impact on agriculture. In the early 1990s, when India liberalised its economy, the organisation issued pamphlets about the effect of globalization. It has translated environment-related books, including Japanese agriculturist Masanobu Fukuoka's The One-Straw Revolution and Rachel Carson's Silent Spring. It has also translated works of Vandana Shiva and Sandra Postel into Tamil.

The organisation publishes a bimonthly environmental magazine called Poovulagu and a children's magazine called Minmini.

== Legal cases ==
After the Fukushima Daiichi nuclear disaster, Poovulagin Nanbargal filed a public interest litigation (PIL) in the Madras High Court in October 2011 to stop the commission of the Kudankulam Nuclear Power Plant. In August 2012, the court accepted the Nuclear Power Corporation of India's assurance on safety of the plant and dismissed the petition. Poovulagin Nanbargal appealed to the Supreme Court of India, but the Supreme Court upheld the decision of the High Court in May 2013.

The organisation also filed PILs against the government to stop projects such as the Chennai-Salem Expressway and Neutrino Observatory. It opposed the extraction of hydrocarbon in Neduvasal.

== Festivals ==
Every year, the organisation conducts a day-long conference with a millet food festival. In 2012, it conducted Aindhinai Vizha (festival of five landscape), where scholars spoke about the present environmental impact on the Sangam landscape. In 2013, Muneer Vizhavu (festival of water) talked about conservation of water. In 2014, Aimbootham Vizha (festival of five elements) celebrated classical elements as mentioned in the Sangam literature. In 2015, the Pozhuthugal Aaru (six seasons) conference talked about the six seasons in the Tamil calendar.
