= Raasaleela =

Rasaleela
- Theatrical release poster
- Directed by: N. Sankaran Nair
- Written by: N. Sankaran Nair
- Story by: R. C. Sakthi; Kamal Haasan
- Produced by: Carmel Johny, Cartoonist Thomas, Rahman
- Starring: Kamal Haasan; Jayasudha; Kanakadurga; Rajasree
- Cinematography: J. Williams
- Edited by: Ravi
- Music by: Salil Choudhry
- Production company: R.J.T. Films
- Release date: 12 December 1975
- Country: India
- Language: Malayalam

Raasaleela is a 1975 Indian Malayalam-language film directed by N. Sankaran Nair and produced by Carmel Johny for RJD Films, starring Kamal Haasan and Jayasudha in her Malayalam debut. It is a remake of the Tamil film Unarchigal, which also starred Kamal Haasan but got released before the original. Rasaleela was dubbed and released in both Tamil and Telugu, and ran for 100 days each in their respective language cities.

== Cast ==
- Kamal Haasan as Devan
- Jayasudha as Unnimaya
- M. G. Soman
- Sankaradi
- Bahadoor
- Kanakadurga
- Manimala
- Rajasree (Gracy)

== Production ==
Raasaleela was first filmed in Tamil as Unarchigal, which also starred Kamal Haasan, but Raasaleela released first. The film directed by N. Sankaran Nair, story written by R. C. Sakthi and Kamal Haasan. The final length of the film's prints were 3,547.10 metres (11,637.5 ft) long.

== Remake ==
In 2012, Majeed Marangery remade the film with the same title. However, it failed to repeat the success.

== Soundtrack ==
Rasaleela

Soundtrack album by Salil Choudhry
- Released: 1975
- Genre: Feature film soundtrack
- Language: Malayalam
- Producer: Salil Choudhry
External audio
- Official Audio Jukebox on YouTube

The music was composed by Salil Chowdhary and the lyrics were written by Vayalar Ramavarma.

No.	Song	Singers	Lyrics
1	"Aayilyam Paadathe Penne"	K. J. Yesudas, Vani Jairam, Chorus	Vayalar Ramavarma
2	"Manakkale Thathe"	K. J. Yesudas	Vayalar Ramavarma
3	"Neeyum Vidhavayo"	P. Susheela	Vayalar Ramavarma
4	"Nishaasurabhikal"	P. Jayachandran	Vayalar Ramavarma
