= Unarchigal =

Unarchigal may refer to:

- Unarchigal (1976 film), an Indian Tamil-language film
- Unarchigal (2006 film), an Indian Tamil-language drama film
