= Koottu Puzhukkal =

- Theatrical release poster
- Directed by: R. C. Sakthi
- Screenplay by: R. C. Sakthi
- Based on: Koottu Puzhukkal by Anuradha Ramanan
- Produced by: M. Sundar Rajan; G. M. Ranga Raj
- Starring: Raghuvaran; Amala; Chandrasekhar
- Music by: M. S. Viswanathan
- Production company: Palayee Amman Art Creations
- Release date: 12 September 1987
- Running time: 130 minutes
- Country: India
- Language: Tamil

Koottu Puzhukkal (pronounced [kuːʈʈuppuɻukkaɭ] transl. Cocooned worms) is a 1987 Indian Tamil-language film written and directed by R. C. Sakthi. The film stars Raghuvaran and Amala, supported by Chandrasekhar and Y. Vijaya. It is based on the novel of the same name by Anuradha Ramanan. The film was released on 12 September 1987.

== Plot ==
Balu is a politically conscious and helpful autorickshaw driver who has feelings for his neighbour Manga, whose mother Devaki who is involved in illicit affairs with men coerces Manga to join her. Surya is an unemployed BCom graduate from a family of modest means and is dependent on his older brother for money. The older brother often derides them for asking him for money. Meanwhile, Rajam, another resident of the same housing complex is desirous of Surya. Gundurao is the head of another family with three daughters who need to be married. Vedavalli is a young working woman who faces troubles in finding a suitor for marriage, with the father of prospective grooms demanding exorbitant amounts in dowry. The climax reveals whether Raghuvaran succeeds in his love.

== Cast ==
- Raghuvaran as Surya
- Amala as Manga
- Chandrasekhar as Balu
- Y. Vijaya as Rajam
- C. I. D. Sakunthala as Devaki
- Radha Ravi as Baburam Settu
- Deepa
- Srikanth as House owner
- S. S. Chandran as Gundurao
- Saritha as Vedavalli
- S. N. Lakshmi
- Kamala Kamesh
- Thideer Kannaiah
- K. Rajan as Autorickshaw driver
- Ilavarasi
- Kutty Padmini
- V. Gopalakrishnan
- Charuhasan
- T. S. Raghavendra
- Mohini as Surya's sister

== Production ==
Koottu Puzhukkal is based on the novel of the same name by Anuradha Ramanan. Since the film's plot was primarily set in a housing complex, the film was shot at Kamakoti House at T. Nagar, Madras. A set was built on the top of the house to show eight houses as per the film's concept.

== Soundtrack ==
The soundtrack was composed by M. S. Viswanathan. The song "Nitham Nitham En" is set in Pahadi raga.

Track listing
No.	Title	Lyrics	Singer(s)	Length
1.	"Nitham Nitham"	Pulamaipithan	S. P. Balasubrahmanyam, M. S. Viswanathan	5:19
2.	"Innaikku Nadandha"	Na. Kamarasan	K. S. Chithra	3:50
3.	"Indha Malligai Poovukku"	Uma Kannadasan	P. Susheela	4:56
4.	"Desathai Parkaiyile Nenjam"	Muthulingam	S. P. Balasubrahmanyam	4:38
Total length:				18:43

== Release and reception ==
Koottu Puzhukkal was released on 12 September 1987. The Indian Express wrote, "It's a poignant film [...] the screenplay flits breathlessly from family to family .. from character to character.. There is a whole gallery....". Jayamanmadhan of Kalki wrote that with each character saying only two lines, the audience should be given free memory to remember them.
