= Coalbed methane =

Form of natural gas extracted from coal beds

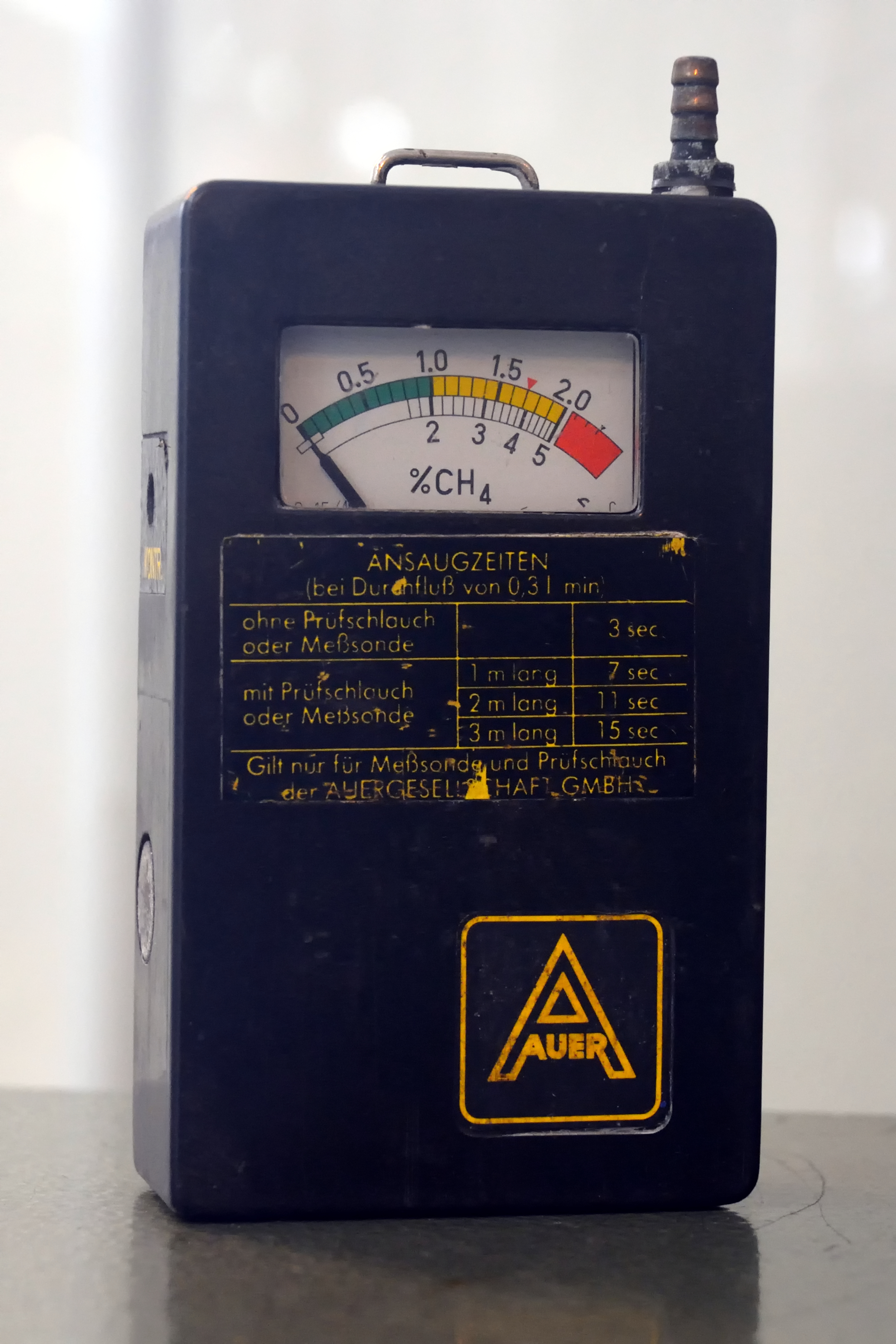
A German methane detector used for coal mining in the 1960s.

Coalbed methane (CBM or coal-bed methane), coalbed gas, or coal seam gas (CSG) is a form of natural gas extracted from coal beds. In recent decades it has become an important source of energy in United States, Canada, Australia, and other countries.

The term refers to methane absorbed into the solid matrix of the coal. It is called "sweet gas" because of its lack of hydrogen sulfide. The presence of this gas is well known from its occurrence in underground coal mining, where it presents a serious safety risk. Coalbed methane is distinct from a typical sandstone or other conventional gas reservoir, as the methane is stored within the coal by a process called adsorption. The methane is in a near-liquid state, lining the inside of pores within the coal (called the matrix). The open fractures in the coal (called the cleats) can also contain free gas or can be saturated with water.

Unlike much natural gas from conventional reservoirs, coalbed methane contains very little heavier hydrocarbons such as propane or butane, and no natural-gas condensate. It often contains up to a few percent carbon dioxide. Coalbed methane is generally formed due to thermal maturation of kerogen and organic matter, in contrast to coal seams with regular groundwater recharge where methane is typically generated by microbial communities living in situ.

== History ==
In 1975 a project to test the potential for economic gas production from coal seams was funded by Standard of Indiana, the parent company of Amoco Production Company. Edward M Warner, a junior geologist in Denver had convinced John Swearengen, Chairman of the Board of Standard to fund his research project. The first well drilled for coalbed methane, the Amoco Production Company Cahn Gas Com #1, drilled in 1976 was so successful that Amoco converted the project from research to production in 1977. Amoco never revealed that the gas was from coalbeds labelling the production simply from the Fruitland Formation. Warner’s revolutionary idea was finally acknowledged by the American Association of Petroleum Geologists in 2009. Dr. Ed Dolly, Professor Paul Weimer and Colorado State Geologist, Vince Matthews confirmed the information and produced a short documentary/interview with Ed (https://www.aapg.org/videos/geolegends-ed-warner/). The Cahn Gas Com#1/#1A research well is the largest coalbed methane producer in the history of the coalbed methane play at over 23BCF.

Coalbed methane grew out of venting methane from coal seams. Some coal beds have long been known to be "gassy" so, as a safety measure, boreholes were drilled into the seams from the surface, and the methane allowed to vent before mining.

Coalbed methane as a natural-gas resource received a major push from the US federal government in the late 1970s. Federal price controls were discouraging natural gas drilling by keeping natural gas prices below market levels; at the same time, the government wanted to encourage more gas production. The US Department of Energy funded research into a number of unconventional gas sources, including coalbed methane. Coalbed methane was exempted from federal price controls, and was also given a federal tax credit.

In Australia, commercial extraction of coal seam gas began in 1996 in the Bowen Basin of Queensland.

== Reservoir properties ==
Gas contained in coal bed methane is mainly methane and trace quantities of ethane, nitrogen, carbon dioxide, and few other gases. Intrinsic properties of coal as found in nature determine the amount of gas that can be recovered.

=== Porosity ===
Coalbed methane reservoirs are considered as a dual-porosity reservoirs, where porosity related to cleats (natural fractures) are responsible for flow behavior and reservoir porosity of the matrix is responsible for the storage of gas. The porosity of a coalbed methane reservoir can vary from 10%-20%; However, the cleat porosity of the reservoir is estimated to be in the range of 0.1%-1%

=== Adsorption capacity ===
Adsorption capacity of coal is defined as the volume of gas adsorbed per unit mass of coal usually expressed in SCF (standard cubic feet, the volume at standard pressure and temperature conditions) gas/ton of coal. The capacity to adsorb depends on the rank and quality of coal. The range is usually between 100 and 800 SCF/ton for most coal seams found in the US. Most of the gas in coal beds is in the adsorbed form. When the reservoir is put into production, water in the fracture spaces is pumped off on first. This leads to a reduction of pressure enhancing desorption of gas from the matrix.

=== Fracture permeability ===
Fracture permeability acts as the major channel for the gas to flow. The higher the permeability, the higher the gas production. For most coal seams found in the US, the permeability lies in the range of 0.1–50 milliDarcys. The permeability of fractured reservoirs changes with the stress applied to them. Coal displays a stress-sensitive permeability and this process plays an important role during stimulation and production operations. Fracture permeability in Coalbed methane reservoir tends to increase with depletion of gas; in contrast to conventional reservoirs. This unique behavior is because of shrinking of coal, when methane is released from its matrix, which results in opening up of fractures and increased permeability. It is also believed that due to shrinkage of coal matrix at lower reservoir pressures, there is a loss of horizontal stress in the reservoir which induces in-situ failure of coal. Such a failure has been attributed to sudden decrease in the fracture permeability of the reservoir

=== Thickness of formation and initial reservoir pressure ===
The thickness of the formation may not be directly proportional to the volume of gas produced in some areas.

For example, it has been observed in the Cherokee Basin in Southeast Kansas that a well with a single zone of 1 to 2 feet (0.3 to 0.6 m) of pay can produce excellent gas rates, whereas an alternative formation with twice the thickness can produce next to nothing. Some coal (and shale) formations may have high gas concentrations regardless of the formation's thickness, probably due to other factors of the area's geology.

The pressure difference between the well block and the sand face should be as high as possible as is the case with any producing reservoir in general.

=== Other properties ===
Other affecting parameters include coal density, initial gas-phase concentration, critical gas saturation, irreducible water saturation, and relative permeability to water and gas at conditions of Sw = 1.0 and Sg = 1-Sw irreducible respectively.

== Extraction ==
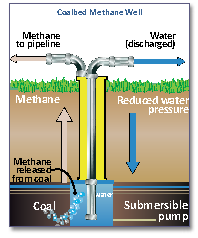
Diagram of a coalbed methane well (US DOE)

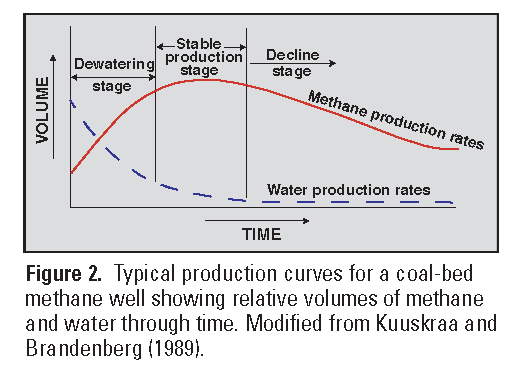
Typical production profile of a coalbed methane well (USGS)

To extract the gas, a steel-encased hole is drilled into the coal seam 100 to 1,500 metres (330 to 4,920 ft) below ground. As the pressure within the coal seam declines due to natural production or the pumping of water from the coalbed, both gas and produced water come to the surface through tubing. Then the gas is sent to a compressor station and into natural gas pipelines. The produced water is either reinjected into isolated formations, released into streams, used for irrigation, or sent to evaporation ponds. The water typically contains dissolved solids such as sodium bicarbonate and chloride but varies depending on the formation geology.

Coalbed methane wells often produce at lower gas rates than conventional reservoirs, typically peaking at near 300,000 cubic feet (8,500 m^{3}) per day (about 0.100 m^{3}/s), and can have large initial costs. The production profiles of CBM wells are typically characterized by a "negative decline" in which the gas production rate initially increases as the water is pumped off and gas begins to desorb and flow. A dry CBM well is similar to a standard gas well.

The methane desorption process follows a curve (of gas content vs. reservoir pressure) called a Langmuir isotherm. The isotherm can be analytically described by a maximum gas content (at infinite pressure), and the pressure at which half that gas exists within the coal. These parameters (called the Langmuir volume and Langmuir pressure, respectively) are properties of the coal, and vary widely. A coal in Alabama and a coal in Colorado may have radically different Langmuir parameters, despite otherwise similar coal properties.

As production occurs from a coal reservoir, the changes in pressure are believed to cause changes in the porosity and permeability of the coal. This is commonly known as matrix shrinkage/swelling. As the gas is desorbed, the pressure exerted by the gas inside the pores decreases, causing them to shrink in size and restricting gas flow through the coal. As the pores shrink, the overall matrix shrinks as well, which may eventually increase the space the gas can travel through (the cleats), increasing gas flow.

The potential of a particular coalbed as a CBM source depends on the following criteria. Cleat density/intensity: cleats are joints confined within coal sheets. They impart permeability to the coal seam. A high cleat density is required for profitable exploitation of CBM. Also important is the maceral composition: maceral is a microscopic, homogeneous, petrographic entity of a corresponding sedimentary rock. A high vitrinite composition is ideal for CBM extraction, while inertinite hampers the same.

The rank of coal has also been linked to CBM content: a vitrinite reflectance of 0.8–1.5% has been found to imply higher productivity of the coalbed.

The gas composition must be considered, because natural gas appliances are designed for gas with a heating value of about 1,000 BTU (British thermal units) per cubic foot, or nearly pure methane. If the gas contains more than a few percent non-flammable gases such as nitrogen or carbon dioxide, either these will have to be removed or it will have to be blended with higher-BTU gas to achieve pipeline quality. If the methane composition of the coalbed gas is less than 92%, it may not be commercially marketable.

"Beyond conventional methods, research institutions like The Energy and Resources Institute (TERI) in India are investigating microbial techniques to enhance methane recovery from coal beds, with reported successful field trials."

== Environmental impacts ==
=== Methane ===
As with all carbon-based fossil fuels, burning coalbed methane releases carbon dioxide (CO_{2}) into the atmosphere. Its effect as greenhouse gas was first analyzed by chemist and physicist Svante Arrhenius. CBM production also entails leaks of fugitive methane into the atmosphere. Methane is rated as having 72 times the effect on global warming per unit of mass than CO_{2.} over 20 years, reducing to 25 times over 100 years and 7.5 times over 500 years. Analysis of life-cycle greenhouse gas emissions of energy sources indicates that generating electricity from CBM, as with conventional natural gas, has less than half the greenhouse gas effect of coal.

Globally, coal mining is also a significant source of methane emissions. To identify the volumes, the industry, governments, and NGOs rely on a combination of emissions monitoring and reporting, estimates, and satellite observations. The current methods for estimating emissions at the coal mine level rely on activity data from the operation and the methane gas content of the coal seams. The emissions methodologies for several academic studies, and NGOs like Global Energy Monitor and Climate Trace, are publicly available.

Multiple Australian studies have indicated the long term negative environmental effects of coal seam gas extraction, both locally and globally.

In the United States, methane escaping from coal during mining amounts to seven percent of total methane emissions. Recovery of coal mine methane in advance of mining is seen as a major opportunity to reduce methane emissions. Companies like CNX Resources have methane abatement programs to reduce greenhouse gas emissions from active and closed mines.

=== Infrastructure ===
CBM wells are connected by a network of roads, pipelines, and compressor stations. Over time, wells may be spaced more closely in order to extract the remaining methane.

=== Produced water ===
The produced water brought to the surface as a byproduct of gas extraction varies greatly in quality from area to area, but may contain undesirable concentrations of dissolved substances such as salts, naturally present chemicals, heavy metals, and radionuclides. In many producing regions the water is treated, such as through a reverse osmosis plant and used beneficially for irrigation, water for livestock, urban and industrial uses, or dust suppression.

==== Pilliga Scrub ====
In 2012 Eastern Star Gas was fined for "discharging polluting water containing high levels of salt into Bohena Creek" in the Pilliga Scrub. There were "16 spills or leaks of contaminated water" including "serious spills of saline water into woodland and a creek." In 2012, a NSW Legislative Council inquiry criticised the use of open holding ponds, recommending that "the NSW Government ban the open storage of produced water."

==== Powder River Basin ====
Not all coalbed methane produced water is saline or otherwise undesirable. Water from coalbed methane wells in the Powder River Basin of Wyoming, US, commonly meets federal drinking water standards, and is widely used in the area to water livestock. Its use for irrigation is limited by its relatively high sodium adsorption ratio.

=== Groundwater ===
Depending on aquifer connectivity, water withdrawal may depress aquifers over a large area and affect groundwater flows. In Australia, the CBM industry estimates extraction of 126,000 million litres (3.3×10^{10} US gallons) to 280,000 million litres (7.4×10^{10} US gallons) of groundwater per year; while the National Water Commission estimates extraction above 300,000 million litres (7.9×10^{10} US gallons) a year.

=== Power generation ===
In 2012, the Aspen Skiing Company built a 3-megawatt methane-to-electricity plant in Somerset, Colorado at Oxbow Carbon's Elk Creek Mine.

== Coalbed methane producing areas ==
=== Australia ===
Coal seam gas resources are in the major coal basins in Queensland and New South Wales, with further potential resources in South Australia. Commercial recovery of coal seam gas (CSG) began in Australia in 1996. As of 2014, coal seam gas, from Queensland and New South Wales, made up about ten percent of Australia's gas production. Demonstrated reserves were estimated to be 33 trillion cubic feet (35 905 petajoules) as of January 2014.

- Bowen Basin
- Surat Basin
- Sydney Basin

=== Canada ===
In Canada, British Columbia is estimated to have approximately 90 trillion cubic feet (2.5 trillion cubic metres) of coalbed gas. Alberta, in 2013, was the only province with commercial coalbed methane wells and is estimated to have approximately 170 trillion cubic feet (4.8 trillion cubic metres) of economically recoverable coalbed methane, with overall reserves totaling up to 500 trillion cubic feet (14 trillion cubic metres).

Coalbed methane is considered a non-renewable resource, although the Alberta Research Council, Alberta Geological Survey and others have argued coalbed methane is a renewable resource because the bacterial action that formed the methane is ongoing. This is subject to debate since it has also been shown that the dewatering that accompanies CBM production destroys the conditions needed for the bacteria to produce methane and the rate of formation of additional methane is undetermined. This debate is currently causing a right of ownership issue in the Canadian province of Alberta, as only non-renewable resources can legally be owned by the province.

=== United Kingdom ===
Although gas in place in Britain's coal fields has been estimated to be 2,900 billion cubic meters, it may be that as little as one percent might be economically recoverable. Britain's CBM potential is largely untested. Some methane is extracted by coal mine venting operations, and burned to generate electricity. Assessment by private industry of coalbed methane wells independent of mining began in 2008, when 55 onshore exploration licences were issued, covering 7,000 square kilometers of potential coalbed methane areas. IGas Energy became the first in the UK to commercially extract coalbed methane separate from mine venting; as of 2012, the Igas coalbed methane wells at Doe Green, extracting gas for electrical generation, were the only commercial CBM wells in the UK. The use of CBM (in GWh) for electricity generation, coal extraction, and other industries in the UK is as shown.

View chart definition.

=== United States ===
United States coalbed methane production in 2017 was 1.76 trillion cubic feet (TCF), 3.6 percent of all US dry gas production that year. The 2017 production was down from the peak of 1.97 TCF in 2008. Most CBM production came from the Rocky Mountain states of Colorado, Wyoming, and New Mexico.

=== Kazakhstan ===
Kazakhstan could witness the development of a large coalbed methane (CBM) sector over the coming decades, according to industry professionals. Preliminary research suggests there may be as much as 900 billion m3 of gas in Kazakhstan's main coalfields – 85% of all reserves in Kazakhstan.

=== India ===
Great Eastern Energy (GEECL) was the first company with a field development plan approved. With the completion of the drilling of 23 vertical production wells by GEECL, coalbed methane became commercially available in India on 14 July 2007 with CNG priced at ₹30 per kg. Initially 90% of the CBM would be distributed as CNG gas to fuel vehicles.

GEECL is responsible for Southeast Asia's first CBM station and is also locating one in the West Bengal city of Asansol.

Prashant Modi, President and Chief Operating Officer of GEECL, said, "With the nation requiring higher energy sources to sustain its development pace, we are confident that CBM will play an important role as one of the prime energy sources for the future generations."

Essar Group's Essar Oil and Gas Exploration and Production Ltd.'s CBM portfolio includes 5 blocks. Currently, only one of them, Raniganj East, is currently operational. The others include Rajmahal in Jharkhand, Talcher and Ib Valley in Odisha, and Sohagpur in Madhya Pradesh. The 5 blocks possess an estimated 10 trillion cubic feet (CBF) of CBM reserves.

== See also ==
- Firedamp
- Underground coal gasification
- Western Canada Sedimentary Basin
