= Sirai (1984 film) =

1984 film by R. C. Sakthi

- DVD cover
- Directed by: R. C. Sakthi
- Screenplay by: R. C. Sakthi
- Based on: Sirai by Anuradha Ramanan
- Produced by: Mohan
- Starring: Lakshmi; Rajesh
- Cinematography: Vishwam–Nataraj
- Edited by: G. Radhakrishnan
- Music by: M. S. Viswanathan
- Production company: Anandhi Films
- Distributed by: Anandhi Films
- Release date: 22 November 1984
- Running time: 143 minutes
- Country: India
- Language: Tamil

Sirai (transl. Prison; also spelt Chirai) is a 1984 Indian Tamil-language drama film written and directed by R. C. Sakthi. The film stars Lakshmi and Rajesh, with Pandiyan, Ilavarasi, Prasanna, S. S. Chandran, V. Gopalakrishnan and Isari Velan in supporting roles. It follows a Brahmin woman who, after being raped by an alcoholic man, is disowned by her husband. After being encouraged by a police constable, she moves in with the rapist and develops an attachment for him.

Sirai is based on Anuradha Ramanan's 1980 short story of the same name. The film was produced by Mohan of Anandhi Films, photographed by the duo Vishwam–Nataraj, and edited by G. Radhakrishnan, with music by M. S. Viswanathan. It shot on actual locales, with minimal use of sets, although shooting also took place at Vauhini Studios.

Sirai was released on 22 November 1984. Despite receiving criticism from Brahmin organisations who demanded it be banned, the film received critical acclaim, particularly for Lakshmi's performance, and became a commercial success, with a theatrical run of over 100 days. The film was remade in Telugu as Siksha (1985).

== Plot ==
Anthony is a wealthy, immoral landlord and drunkard who indulges in several atrocities. The village chief Ondriyam and the police inspector are his supporters. Irudhayasami, an honest and soon-to-retire senior police constable, arrests a man who attempted to rape a woman, but due to Anthony's clout, the accused is exonerated. Irudhayasami curses that one day Anthony would repent for his sins.

Raghupathi and Bhagirathi, a Brahmin couple, move into the village and settle in the house next to Anthony's. Anthony lusts after Bhagirathi and one night when Raghupathi is not home, a drunk Anthony rapes Bhagirathi. When Raghupathi notices Anthony walking away from his home and Bhagirathi crying, he disowns her as she is maligned. When she refuses, he leaves the home after locking it without informing her and does not return. Left outside the locked house, Bhagirathi searches for him but fails. When no one supports her in the village and she is helpless and alone, Irudhayasami advises her to move into Anthony's house as he is the root cause of all her troubles.

Bhagirathi goes to Anthony's house and declares that he should take responsibility for her as he is the cause of her hardship and confines herself to a room in his house, warning him that he should not enter it at any cost in the name of Mother Mary. She states that as she is unable to punish him for his sin, she is punishing herself by being in his home and living in a room like a prison. His punishment is watching her suffer before his eyes for the sin he committed.

Anthony's servant Marudhu takes care of Bhagirathi's needs. Soon, Anthony realises his mistakes and his attitude and behaviour change. He helps his worker Muthu marry his lover Jilla, daughter of Ondriyam, by gifting his lands to him. Anthony helps Bhagirathi's father financially to get her three sisters married on the same day. Gradually, he advises everyone to hand over his financial matters to Bhagirathi and people start gossiping about their relationship. He stops drinking, smoking, womanising, and his house is converted into a proper living place. Though Bhagirathi is happy that he is a changed person, she frequently reminds him of his sins which caused harm to many.

One day, Anthony suffers a paralytic attack and becomes bedridden. He regrets all his sins, particularly to Bhagirathi, who now takes care of him. She even nurses him in the absence of his servant. Anthony requests Marudhu to locate Raghupathi and bring him. Raghupathi is found and agrees to come the next day. On the same night, Anthony becomes weak. He requests Bhagirathi to sing the song which she sang when she was happily married and which tempted him to molest her. Listening to her song, Anthony dies. When Anthony's coffin leaves, Bhagirathi realises how he took care of her and cries that she has no one to take care of her now.

Raghupathi comes after the coffin has left and asks Bhagirathi to join him the next day. She refuses and tells him that a couple should be together in good and bad times. When she needed him the most, he deserted her; though Anthony molested her for his momentary pleasure, he regretted his mistake and took great care of her, treating her with respect till his end. So she would be proud to be Anthony's widow rather than the wife of a self-centered husband who did not take care of his life partner. She removes her tali, the symbol of their marriage, and continues to live in Anthony's house.

== Cast ==
- Lakshmi as Bhagirathi
- Rajesh as Anthony
- Pandiyan as Muthu
- Ilavarasi as Jilla
- Prasanna as Raghupathi
- S. S. Chandran as Ondriyam
- V. Gopalakrishnan as Irudhayasami
- Isari Velan as Marudhu
- Anuradha (special appearance in the song "Paathuko")

== Production ==
Sirai was a short story written by Anuradha Ramanan and published in 1980. The story, which was published in the Tamil magazine Ananda Vikatan, won a gold medal for the best short story. Lakshmi, who liked the story, suggested R. C. Sakthi to adapt it for the screen, and promised to act if he did. When Anandhi Films approached Sakthi to direct a film for them, he pitched Sirai, and they agreed despite initial hesitance. The film was produced by Mohan of Anandhi, cinematography was handled by the duo Vishwam–Nataraj, and editing by G. Radhakrishnan. Sakthi chose Rajesh for the character of Anthony as he felt his physique suited the character very well. The film was launched at Prasad Studios. Most of the film was shot on actual locales, with minimal use of sets, although shooting also took place at Vauhini Studios. It was made as a CinemaScope film.

== Themes ==
Sirai, like many of Sakthi's films, is a women-centric film. Journalist Kumuthan Maderya, writing for PopMatters, described it as following the stockholm syndrome trope, and as an early "Beauty and the Beast"-type story in Tamil cinema. In the book Women in Films: An Incisive Study Into the Issues and Trends (2000), R. Kannan wrote that Sirai "boldly attempted to express the view that by merely tying Tali (Mangalasutra) a man cannot become a husband." He also felt it was the inverse of most Tamil films which used to exalt the tali sentiment.

== Soundtrack ==
The soundtrack was composed by M. S. Viswanathan. The film marked lyricist Piraisoodan's cinematic debut. The song "Naan Paadikkonde Iruppen" is set in the Carnatic raga known as Shyama.

Track listing
No.	Title	Lyrics	Singer(s)	Length
1.	"Naan Paadikkonde Iruppen"	Pulamaipithan	Vani Jairam	4:34
2.	"Paathukko"	Muthulingam	S. Janaki	4:44
3.	"Rasathi Rosapoo Vektam Eno Innum"	Piraisoodan	K. J. Yesudas, Vani Jairam	4:17
4.	"Vidhi Enum Karangalil"	Pulamaipithan	M. S. Viswanathan	4:28
Total length:				18:03

== Release ==
Sirai was released on 22 November 1984. The film received an "A" (adults only) certificate from the Censor Board after 10 cuts. Distributors objected to the climax; they told Sakthi they would buy the film if he change the climax into one where Bhagirathi reunites with her husband or commits suicide, but Sakthi adamantly refused. 60 preview shows took place, but no distributor was willing to buy the film. As a result, Anandhi Films had to distribute the film themselves. Although criticised by Brahmin organisations who demanded for it to be banned, the film received critical acclaim (particularly for Lakshmi's performance) and became a commercial success, with a 100-day theatrical run. It was released on DVD in 2002 by Pyramid Films.

== Reception ==
In their issue dated 23 December 1984, Ananda Vikatan published the reviews of readers rather than their own. The review board wrote that the screenplay was more engaging and intense than the short story, praised the performance of Lakshmi but criticised the item number featuring Anuradha. On 6 January 1985, Jayamanmadhan of Kalki wrote that while the film as a whole could not be appreciated, individual aspects could, such as the bold theme.

Film historian S. Theodore Baskaran, in his 1996 book The eye of the serpent, felt that much of the film's impact was diluted by elements like the cabaret dance, duets and a fight sequence along with clichéd devices like using obesity for comic effect, all of which he described as the "trappings of a run-of-the-mill commercial movie". Encyclopaedia of Indian Cinema by Ashish Rajadhyaksha and Paul Willemen concurred, feeling they were inserted for "box-office reasons". Baskaran said that the passage of years that Bhagirathi spends in Anthony's house had not been depicted "visually at all", but described Lakshmi's performance as the "high point" of the film. Rajadhyaksha and Willemen stated that Lakshmi gave an "accomplished repeat performance of a rape victim" after Sila Nerangalil Sila Manithargal (1977).

== Impact ==
Sirai was one of the earliest Tamil films to explore the relationship between the rapist and the victim. It also emerged a "landmark" in Rajesh's career. Critic Baradwaj Rangan compared Pudhea Paadhai (1989) to Sirai as "both revolve around a rapist who is reformed by the rape survivor". Maderya felt that both the films "advance an atavistic moral solution to the problem of rape."

== Bibliography ==
- Baskaran, S. Theodore (1996). The eye of the serpent: an introduction to Tamil cinema. Chennai: East West Books. OCLC 645890539.
- Dhananjayan, G. (2011). The Best of Tamil Cinema, 1931 to 2010: 1977–2010. Galatta Media. OCLC 733724281.
- Kannan, R. (2000). Women in Films: An Incisive Study Into the Issues and Trends. Publications Division, Madurai Kamaraj University. OCLC 52929453.
- Rajadhyaksha, Ashish; Willemen, Paul (1998) [1994]. Encyclopaedia of Indian Cinema. British Film Institute and Oxford University Press. ISBN 0-19-563579-5.
- Sundararaman (2007) [2005]. Raga Chintamani: A Guide to Carnatic Ragas Through Tamil Film Music (2nd ed.). Chennai: Pichhamal Chintamani. OCLC 295034757.
- Sunder Rajan, Rajeswari (1994). Higonnet, Margaret R. (ed.). Borderwork: Feminist Engagements with Comparative Literature. Cornell University Press. ISBN 0-8014-8107-4.
