= Manakanakku =

1986 film by R. C. Sakthi

- Poster
- Directed by: R. C. Sakthi
- Written by: R. C. Sakthi
- Produced by: J. Manohar
- Starring: Vijayakanth; Radha; Rajesh; Sarath Babu; Ambika
- Cinematography: Vipindas
- Edited by: G. Radhakrishnan
- Music by: M. S. Viswanathan
- Production company: Vinod Art Pictures
- Release date: 28 February 1986
- Running time: 143 minutes
- Country: India
- Language: Tamil

Manakanakku (transl. Mental calculation) is a 1986 Indian Tamil-language film directed by R. C. Sakthi, starring Vijayakanth, Sarath Babu, Rajesh, Ambika and Radha. Kamal Haasan acted in a guest appearance. This was the only film where Haasan and Vijayakanth appeared onscreen together. The film was released on 28 February 1986.

== Cast ==
- Vijayakanth as Ramanu
- Radha as Lakshmi
- Rajesh as Pandiyan
- Sarath Babu as Lakshmi's husband
- Malashri as actress
- Senthamarai as Ambalam
- Ambika as Kalyani, Pandiyan Wife
- Baby Sujitha as Murali
- Thideer Kannaiah
- MLA Thangaraj
- 'Rocket' Ramanathan
- Kamal Haasan as Film director (Guest appearance)

== Production ==
The film was produced by J. Manohar, Radha's makeup man. The film began production with song recording during the launch at Prasad Studios.

== Soundtrack ==
The music was composed by M. S. Viswanathan.

Track listing
No.	Title	Lyrics	Singer(s)	Length
1.	"En Manakkootukkulle"	Panchu Arunachalam	P. Jayachandran
2.	"Thathi Kuthitha"	Vaali	S. Janaki and Chorus
3.	"Konji Konji"	Pulamaipithan	Vani Jairam
4.	"Chinna Chinna"	Panchu Arunachalam	P. Jayachandran
5.	"Manja poosi"	Panchu Arunachalam	P. Jayachandran
6.	"Maavaduva"	Panchu Arunachalam	P. Jayachandran

== Reception ==
Jayamanmadhan of Kalki wrote Manakanakku is a crowning achievement for director R. C. Sakthi who weaved a dense story neatly.
