= Kaveri delta coal-bed methane project =

The Kaveri delta coal-bed methane extraction project is a series of projects to extract methane gas and hydrocarbon from coal-bed by using hydraulic fracturing in the Kaveri river basin in Tamil Nadu, India. The extraction projects faced series of opposition from the farmers, environmentalists, and experts as exploration areas covering Nagapattinam, Thanjavur and Thiruvarur districts which are the major rice cultivating area of Tamil Nadu.

== Projects ==
A clutch of projects in the petroleum and natural gas sectors for Tamil Nadu, involving investments exceeding Rs.10,000 crores, is at an advanced stage of clearance by the Centre.

This was disclosed today by the CPI(M) MP representing Madurai, Mr. P. Mohan, who is also a member of the Parliamentary Standing Committee on Petroleum and Chemicals.

While the Public Investment Board (PIB) has cleared MRL's proposal for increasing its refining capacity at Manali from 6.5 million tonnes (MT) to 9.5 MT per annum at a cost of Rs. 2360 crores, Mr. Mohan said the Environment Ministry's clearance for the same was expected shortly.

Soon after that was obtained, the proposal will go to the Cabinet Committee on Economic Affairs (CCEA) for approval. The project will then be completed in about 36 months.

On the 500 MW power project planned by MRL near Manali using heavy fuel available from the refinery, Mr. Mohan said the Centre had approved its implementation by a joint venture company with PSEG Global and Larsen & Toubro as the partners. The detailed feasibility report (DFR) is expected to be received shortly.

Dispelling impressions that the CPI(M) was not concerned about Tamil Nadu's industrial growth, Mr. Mohan said he was also pressing the Centre to quickly clear the expansion of the existing 0.5 million tonnes per year refinery of MRL at Panangudi.

Even as the MOU between MRL and IOC, reached in October 1998, envisaged both pursuing a domestic refinery project, the IOC's Board has already approved the Panangudi

mini-refinery expansion by 8 million tonnes per year at a cost of Rs.7257 crores. The joint venture formed for the purpose would take over the existing assets and liabilities of MRL's facilities at Panangudi.

The DFR for the expansion project, prepared by an international consultant, is presently under evaluation.

On the proposed LNG terminal at Ennore, Mr.Mohan said the Centre had no plans to develop any `marketing plan' to market the LNG imports as importers could choose their own customers.

However, if the importers of LNG were interested, they could tie up with the Gas Authority of India Limited (GAIL) for marketing the gas.

Further, the proposal to put in place a "suitable regulatory framework" for the natural gas/LNG sector in the Country was currently being examined by the Ministry of Petroleum and Natural Gas, Mr. Mohan said.

Regarding projects for tapping methane from the lignite bed at Mannargudi, the Centre has initiated action through the Directorate General of Hydrocarbons (DGH) to collect methane- related date from there.

The job has been entrusted to the Mineral Exploration Corporation Limited (MECL), a GOI agency, to drill a new well at a favourable geological location in Mannargudi area. The ONGC was also continuing its exploration in the Cauvery Basin and in Ramanathapuram area.

As a result of the exploration, ONGC has been able to establish "production of oil @ 0.375 million tonnes per year and gas production @ 0.4 million cubic metres per day as on 1.1.2000", he said, quoting Ministerial figures.

While the Chennai-Tiruchi-Madurai petro-product pipeline at a cost of Rs.538.70 crores was scheduled to be completed by 31 July 2001, Mr. Mohan said the feasibility of implementing the project was being re-examined in view of the new upcoming Cuddalore Refinery. The product availability from Cuddalore Refinery would also be required to be taken into account.

In July 2009, Ministry of Petroleum and Natural Gas, Government of India gave licence to Great Eastern Energy Corporation Limited to explore and extract coalbed methane for 667 square kilometers in the Mannarkudi block of Thiruvarur district, Tamil Nadu. Subsequently, the state government under Dravida Munnetra Kazhagam Signed a MOU (Memorandum of Understanding) granting the firm rights in researching the presence of methane particles and sighting industrial development in the locality. However on exploration, the company found the presence of methane particles, and the company has a plan to drill 50 core production wells of 150-450 metre deep in the ground. In September 2012, the Union Ministry for Environment and Forests (UMOEF) issued environmental clearance to the project. The farmers and environmentalists staged public protests against the permission for extraction. The state government under Anna Dravida Munnetra Kazhagam suspended the project in 2013. On 10 November 2016, the Union Minister of state for Petroleum and Natural Gas, Dharmendra Pradhan, said that the project has been withdrawn.

In 2009, Oil and Natural Gas Corporation (ONGC) dug a well in Neduvasal, Pudukottai district to explore hydrocarbon in the region. As part of the Government of India's Discovered small fields policy, a contract given to GEM laboratories private limited in December 2016 to extract hydrocarbon for 10 square kilometers in the village. Opposition from the farmers stopped the project in May 2018.

In October 2018, Petroleum minister Dharmendra Pradhan signed agreement with the Vedanta Limited and ONGC to extract hydrocarbon in Nagapattinam and Chidambaram respectively. The farmers in the region opposed the agreement and burnt an effigy of Pradhan.

== Environmental impact and oppositions ==
From the time the public become aware of this project, it was fervently opposed by the farmers of Kaveri delta region. Organic farming expert G. Nammalvar was spearheading the opposition until his death due to brief illness in the demonstration field. Protesters often cite the possibility of harmful and dangerous effects of the project to agriculture and life in the region.

On 15 February 2017, people of Neduvasal started their agitation a day after Cabinet Committee on Economic Affairs approval to extract the fields. The agitation continued for 22 days, after meeting with the Petroleum minister, the Union minister Pon Radhakrishnan assured that "Central government will not force any project against the wishes of the people." In 12 April, the protests resumed after the information that project would be executed. The protests was called off after 174 days following assurance from the district administration.
