= G. M. Sundar =

Indian actor and film producer

- Occupations: Actor, Producer
- Years active: 1986–2005; 2016–present

G. M. Sundar is an Indian actor and film producer who has acted in a number of Tamil films. He turned producer for the film Urumattram.

== Career ==
He studied acting at the Film and Television institute, Adyar. He was given his first role by director K. Balachander in the film Punnagai Mannan.

Later, Sundar was cast by Kamal Haasan in the film Kadamai Kanniyam Kattupaadu and Sathyaa, produced by Raaj Kamal Films.

Apart from mainstream films, Sundar played the lead role in the national award-winning film Ooruku Nooruper directed by B. Lenin. He also acted in and produced a short film, Urumattram, which won the national award for the Best Environmental Film.

After a brief hiatus, Sundar has entered into the second phase of his acting career through Nalan Kumarasamy's Kadhalum Kadanthu Pogum, starring Vijay Sethupathi and Madonna Sebastian. It was a critical and box office success.

== Filmography ==
Year	Title	Role	Notes
1986	Punnagai Mannan	Dance Student	
1987	Kadamai Kanniyam Kattupaadu		
1988	Sathyaa	Sundar	credited as Sundar
1990	Pulan Visaranai		
1990	Kavalukku Kettikaran	Panneer	
1990	Unnai Solli Kutramillai		credited as Sundar
1991	Kizhakku Karai		
1991	Nanbargal	Beeda	
1992	Thanga Manasukkaran	Duraipandi	
1993	Ponnumani		
1994	Adharmam		
1998	Kizhakkum Merkkum		
2001	Mitta Miraasu		
2002	Urumattram		Also producer
2003	Ooruku Nooruper	Anandan	
2005	Thotti Jaya	Santhanam	
2016	Kadhalum Kadandhu Pogum	Thilagar	
2017	Podhuvaga Emmanasu Thangam	Dharmalingam	
2018	Seethakaathi	Dhanapal's lawyer	
2019	Magamuni	Corrupt Police Officer	
2021	Mandela	Rathnam	
2021	Sarpatta Parambarai	Duraikannu Vaathiyar	
2021	Writer	Marudhamuthu	
2021	Jai Bhim		
2022	Valimai	IG Arasu	
2022	Jana Gana Mana	Nageshwar Rao	Malayalam film
2022	Viruman	MLA Pathinettaampadiyan	
2023	Thunivu	Muthazagan	
2023	Ulagammai	Palavesam Nadar	
2024	Amigo Garage	Anand	
2024	Vettaiyan	Lourdhu Samy	
2024	Rasavathi	Police Inspector	
2025	Akkada Ammayi Ikkada Abbayi	Rajanna	Telugu film
2025	Akkenam	Deva	
2026	Vaa Vaathiyaar	Mani	
2026	Jana Nayagan	Loganathan	
