= Haridev Joshi University of Journalism and Mass Communication =

State university in Rajasthan, India

- Type: Public
- Established: 2019; 7 years ago
- Affiliations: UGC
- Chancellor: Governor of Rajasthan
- Vice-Chancellor: Sudhi Rajiv
- Location: Jaipur, Rajasthan, India; 26.8708717°N 75.804616°E
- Website: hju.ac.in

Haridev Joshi University of Journalism and Mass Communication (HJU) is a state university located at Jaipur, Rajasthan, India. In similar name, but slightly different abbreviation of HJUJ, a university was established in 2012 by the Congress govt through an Act of the Government of Rajasthan which was closed in 2015 by the next BJP govt. The Congress govt returned to power in December 2018 and a new university for journalism and mass communication — HJU — was constituted through the State Legislature's Act No. 11 of 2019, at the premises of historical Khasa Kothi.

== History ==
=== Establishment ===
HJU, the new university, was established on March 1, 2019. This was one of the new decisions taken by the Ashok Gehlot administration in the beginning of his third tenure. It was again named after the journalist and former Chief Minister of Rajasthan, Haridev Joshi.

=== Closure of 2017 ===
Following the 2013 Rajasthan Legislative Assembly election and the rise of the Vasundhara Raje administration, a cabinet sub-committee recommended the closure HJUJ as well as two other institutes, Rajiv Gandhi Tribal University (RGTU) and Dr Bhimrao Ambedkar Law University. In July 2015 the new administration renamed and moved RGTU and stopped the admission process for the following year in HJUJ redirecting students to the journalism department in Rajasthan University. This was done to "ensure that a new batch of students was not affected" by future decisions. In November 2015 Dr Bhimrao Ambedkar Law University became the first university to ever be closed in India and in January 2016 the cabinet has decided to merge HJUJ with Rajasthan University. In March 2017 a repeal bill for the closure of the university was introduced to the Rajasthan Legislative Assembly, putting an end to the possibility of reopening of the bill and HJUJ became the second university to be closed in India. The courses which were taught under HJUJ have been running under Rajasthan University's centre of mass communication since then.

=== Re-establishment in 2019 ===
Following the 2018 Rajasthan Legislative Assembly election and the rise of the Third Ashok Gehlot ministry in late 2018, the cabinet decided to open a journalism university afresh under the similar name. Haridev Joshi University of Journalism and Mass Communication, Jaipur Bill, 2019 was introduced on 11 February 2019 and passed on 13 February. On 8 March 2019 newspaper editor Om Thanvi was appointed its first vice-chancellor (VC). The university opened its gates in the academic year 2019–2020. In August 2022, Prof. Sudhi Rajiv was appointed VC.

== Academics ==
The university offers three-year undergraduate (UG) programme granting a Bachelor of Arts in Journalism and Mass Communication degree (BA-JMC), Master of Arts degrees (MA-JMC) in Media Studies, Electronic Media, Development Communication, Advertising & Public Relations and New Media, PG Diploma programmes in Desktop Publishing, Photography, Broadcast Journalism, Public Health and Mass Communication and PhD programme.
