= Urumattram =

- Directed by: B.Sivakumar
- Produced by: B.Sivakumar; G. M. Sundar
- Starring: R. C. Sakthi; G. Nammalvar; G. M. Sundar; Ansari
- Cinematography: Barani
- Edited by: Suresh Urs
- Music by: Agathiyan
- Production company: Aadhi Bhagavan Talkies
- Distributed by: NIL
- Release date: 2003
- Running time: 30 minutes
- Country: India
- Language: Tamil

Urumattram (transl. Transformation) is a 2003 Indian Tamil-language short film directed by B.Sivakumar. It won Best Environment / Conservation / Preservation Film at the 50th National Film Awards.

== Plot ==
The story revolves around a grandfather, his son and grandson. The son who is in hurry to migrate to the U.S. is convinced he has tied up all the loose ends like securing the future of his family as well as the care of his old father. The grand father is shocked by the sale of the ancestral home and is completely shattered by the irresponsibility of maximising gain in turning it over to a plastic factory owner.

The old man is redeemed by the youngster who picks up hope from the grandfather's values - of environment awareness and human relationship.

== Cast ==
- R. C. Sakthi as the grandfather
- G. Nammalvar as a servant
- G. M. Sundar as the son
- Ansari as the grandson
- Lakshmi as the son's wife

== Reception ==
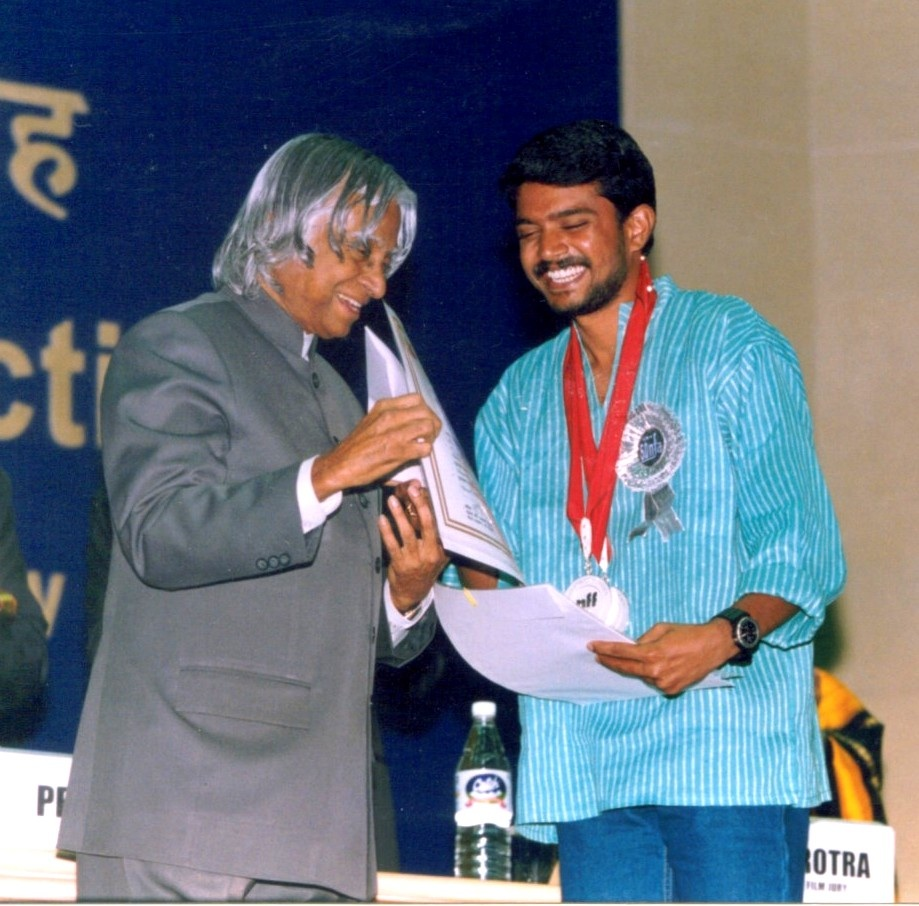
B. Sivakumar receiving the national award.

Screen wrote "Sakti, a renowned director himself, lives the character of the aging father. He brings out the pain and frustration through his expressions. Sundhar, as the materialistic son who only thinks of his family’s security, Lakshmi as his wife who understands the father-in-law’s pain, son Ansari through whom the thoughts of the grandfather comes out have given good performances. Even Nammawazhwar (a scientist on eco-awareness in real life) as the servant plays his part well. Sribharani’s cinematography has captured the mood of the film. Illaikiyan’s re-recording and moments of silence that he keeps increase the effect of the film.".

== Awards ==
- Screened at International Environmental film Festival, VFICA, held in Brazil, 2003.
- Special invite at International SASA Awards 2003, ROME Selected for Vatavaran, 2003.
- Awarded Best short film at New Jersey international film Festival, 2004.
- Winner of the 50th National Film Award for Best Film on Environment Conservation/Preservation received personally from President Mr. A.P.J. Abdul Kalam
