= Rasaleela (2012 film) =

- Poster
- Directed by: Majeed Maranchery
- Written by: Majeed Maranchery; Siju Elamkadu (Dialogue)
- Produced by: Siju Elamkadu; Toji John; Benny Peters
- Starring: Darsham; Prathishta
- Cinematography: V Sushil Kumar
- Edited by: Renjith Nair
- Music by: Sanjoy Chowdhury
- Production company: SBM Entertainment
- Distributed by: SK Films
- Release date: 7 September 2012
- Country: India
- Language: Malayalam

Rasaleela (2012) is a Malayalam language romantic drama film directed by Majeed Maranchery and starring Darshan and Prathishta in the lead roles. The film is a remake of the 1975 Malayalam film of the same name which was directed by N. Sankaran Nair, starring Kamal Haasan and Jayasudha in the lead roles.

Rasaleela marks the coming together of the next generation of talents—Sanjay Chowdhary (son of composer Salil Chowdhary), Vayalar Sarath Chandra Varma (son of lyricist Vayalar Rama Varma) and Vijay Yesudas (son of singer K. J. Yesudas).

== Plot ==
Unni Maya (Prathishta), a widow in a big tharavadu, develops a fondness for Devan (Darshan), who has accompanied a godman, who has been called in to get rid of the bad omens that surround the family.

== Cast ==
- Darshan as Devan
- Prathishta as Unni Maya
- Harikeshan Thampi
- Anoop Chandran
- Kalasala Babu
- Krishna
- Urmila Unni as Savithriyamma

== Soundtrack ==
Track list
No.	Title	Lyrics	Singer(s)	Length
1.	"Himam Moodiyo"	Vayalar Sarath Chandra Varma	Gayatri Asokan
2.	"Neelaambari"	Vayalar Sarath Chandra Varma	Vijay Yesudas
3.	"Nilaavelicham"	Vayalar Sarath Chandra Varma	Gayatri Asokan
4.	"Vilakkinte Naalam"	Vayalar Sarath Chandra Varma	Gayatri Asokan, Najim Arshad
