= Elangadu =

Elangadu Rajagiri, Vaalaivanam
- Village
- Nickname: Rajagiri, Vaalaivanam
- Location in Tamil Nadu, India Elangadu (India)
- Coordinates: 10.8353°N 78.9277°E
- Country: India
- State: Tamil Nadu
- District: Thanjavur
- Taluk: Budalur
- Founder: Karalmax Palani Murugan

Population (2019)
  - Total: 1,600

Languages
  - Official: Tamil
- Time zone: UTC+5:30 (IST)
- Postal code: 613104

Elangadu is an Indian village situated on the banks of the river Cauvery. It is about 12 kilometers from Kallanai, the Grand Anicut. It is surrounded by irrigation canals. Ilankaadu, in Thanjavur district, is nearby. In this village,

== Economy ==
Agriculture is the main occupation in this area. Paddy cultivation is a common occupation along with rice, coconut, banana and sugar cane

== Education ==
Students are taught in Tamil.

== History ==
The residents' passion for Tamil and their desire to become teachers dates to 1881 when ‘Nattramizh Sangam’ was established at the village.

Tamil scholar Pandithurai Devar arrived at Ilankaadu for the inauguration of the Sangam that year. and Tamil has been taught since. Until 2005, Tamil classes and speeches were held every evening. Scholars including UV Saminatha Iyer, Maraimalai Adigal, Somasundara Barathiyar, and many others spoke there.

== Notables ==
- G Nammalvar.
- Tiruchi Siva.
- G Murugaiyan Sethurar
- G Ilangovan Papurettiyar.

== Demographics ==
At the 2018 census, Elangadu had a total population of around 1600 with 790 males and 810 females. The sex ratio was 10:20 and the literacy rate was 77.11%.

== Culture ==
Temples:

- Sree Valavaneeshwar Temple,
- Shri Throwpathi Amman Temple
- Sri Kannan Temple
- Shri Saptha Kannimar Temple
- Sri Athankaatha ayyanar. Temple

Every year in May and June, the Thiruvizha festival is performed in the Thurowpathi Amman Temple.

Every Year in Aavani Month, Sri Krishna Jayanthi (Uriyadi Festivel) is grand celebration in the Sri Kannan Temple
