= Om Thanvi =

Indian writer

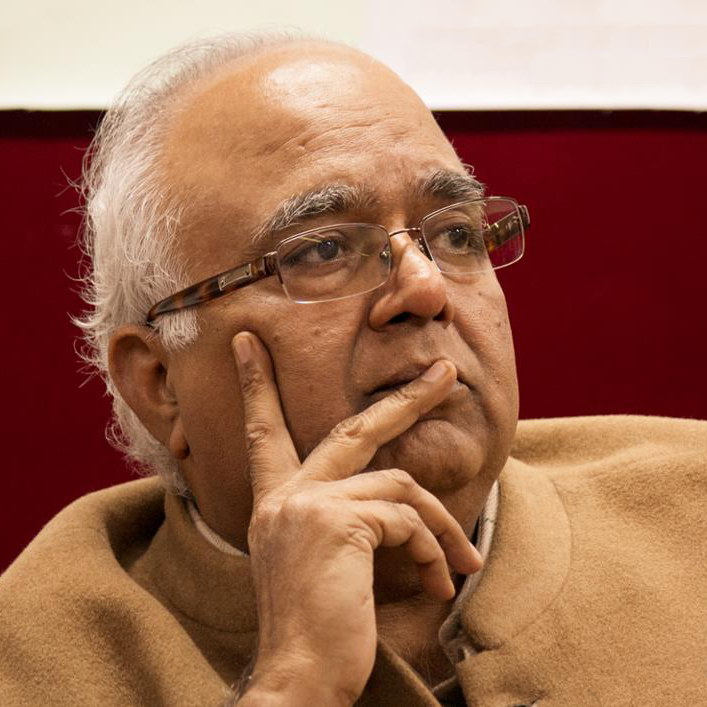
- Thanvi during a conference, 2012
- Born: Omprakash Thanvi; 1 August 1957 (age 69); Phalodi, Jodhpur, Rajasthan, India
- Occupations: Journalist, editor
- Writing career
- Language: Hindi
- Years active: 1977―Present
- Genres: Memoir, criticism
- Subject: Harappan culture
- Notable works: Muanjodaro; Apne Apne Agyey
- Notable awards: Bihari Puraskar, Ganesh Shankar Vidyarthi award

Om Thanvi is a Hindi writer, senior journalist, editor and critic. Thanvi is currently the founding vice-chancellor of Haridev Joshi University of Journalism and Mass Communication. His works include work Apne Apne Agyey, and Muanjodaro. He is also an advisory board member of Muslim Mirror.

== Early life ==
Om Thanvi was born in the town of Phalodi in Jodhpur district of Rajasthan.

== Career ==
Thanvi started journalism in his student days in 1977 contributing to weekly Marudeep daily Yugpaksh (Bikaner) and weekly Ravivar (Calcutta). After completing his Masters in Commerce Thanvi started his mainstream journalism in 1978 with Itwari, a weekly paper from the Rajasthan Patrika in Jaipur, Rajasthan. From 1980 to 1989 he worked in Rajasthan Patrika. After this, he joined the Hindi daily Jansatta of the Indian Express Group and was associated with this newspaper for the next twenty-six years (from 1989 to 2015), serving as a journalist, resident editor (Chandigarh edition, 1989―99), and editor (1999―2015).

After separating from the Jansatta, Thanvi taught as a visiting professor at Jawaharlal Nehru University (JNU) at the Center for Media Studies, School of Social Sciences. He is currently the founding vice-chancellor of Haridev Joshi University of Journalism and Mass Communication, Jaipur (Rajasthan).

== Awards and recognition ==
- Ganesh Shankar Vidyarthi award, awarded by the Central Institute of Hindi.
- His book Muanjodaro, has received the Bihari Puraskar, awarded by K. K. Birla Foundation.
