= Manitharil Ithanai Nirangalah! =

1978 film by R. C. Sakthi

- Theatrical release poster
- Directed by: R. C. Sakthi
- Screenplay by: R. C. Sakthi
- Story by: Govi. Ilangovan
- Starring: Kamal Haasan; Sridevi; Sathyapriya; Murali Mohan
- Cinematography: Benjamin
- Edited by: N. Maheswara Rao
- Music by: Shyam
- Production company: VDS Productions
- Release date: 29 October 1978
- Country: India
- Language: Tamil

Manitharil Ithanai Nirangalah! (transl. Are there so many shades in a person!) is a 1978 Indian Tamil-language film directed by R. C. Sakthi and starring Kamal Haasan, Sridevi and Murali Mohan The film was released on Diwali 1978, coinciding with Sigappu Rojakkal on the same day (also starring Haasan and Sridevi). Despite the film's clash, this particular picture did well above average business.

== Plot ==
Santha is an orphaned young woman who tries to find a job in Madras to survive. She is exploited by a crook and is mistakenly dubbed by the police as a sex worker. She returns to her native village and starts living with her old friend Devaki. Devaki's husband is the belligerent but soft-hearted Velu who runs a cycle-repair shop. Santha relishes her life in the village with Devaki and Velu but things take a turn when the village station-master Mohan falls in love with her. Santha is reluctant to reciprocate due to her past which also returns to haunt her in the form of the inspector who had once arrested her in Madras and is now transferred to her village and also through Mohan's father who had once encountered her in a dubious situation. Whether Santha is able to transcend her unpleasant past and restore normalcy in her life forms the rest of the story.

== Cast ==
- Kamal Haasan as Velu
- Sridevi as Santha
- Murali Mohan as Mohan
- Major Sundarrajan as Mohan's father
- Sathyapriya as Devaki
- P. R. Varalakshmi
- K. A. Thangavelu
- Suruli Rajan
- Manorama as Anjalae
- Oru Viral Krishna Rao
- Sudhakar
- Ceylon Manohar

== Soundtrack ==
The music was composed by Shyam, with lyrics by Kannadasan.

Track listing
No.	Title	Singer(s)	Length
1.	"Mazhai Tharumo En Megam"	S. P. Balasubrahmanyam, (Humming) S. P. Sailaja
2.	"Ponne Boomiyadi"	S. Janaki, Vani Jairam

== Critical reception ==
Ananda Vikatan rated the film 41 out of 100, saying it looked like the editor fell asleep at work. Naagai Dharuman of Anna praised the acting, music, cinematography, dialogues but felt Sakthi could have concentrated more on screenplay.
