= Great Eastern Energy =

- Founded: 1992
- Headquarters: Asansol, West Bengal, India
- Website: www.geecl.com

Great Eastern Energy Corporation Limited is a Coalbed methane (CBM) production company, located in Asansol district of West Bengal. With two CBM blocks, one in Raniganj, West Bengal, and the other in Mannargudi, Tamil Nadu. Great Eastern Energy Corporation has played an important role in providing methane gas. The wells dug in the respective blocks are well connected with gas gathering stations and the gas is fed into its dedicated steel pipeline network to maintain the supply.

It provides compressed natural gas through an agreement with Bharat Petroleum Corporation Limited and Indian Oil Corporation Limited.

== History ==
It was founded in the 1990s. In 1993, the company entered into a memorandum of understanding with Coal India Limited. Followed by this, it carried out core-hole exploration as well as commercial viability tests. As the growth of the company progressed, it signed a Production Sharing Contract with the Ministry of Petroleum and Natural Gas and a petroleum exploration license with the Government of West Bengal in 2001.

Initiating towards first production with three wells, the company struck gas in the first well by 2004. From that time, the company has been active in drilling wells and now claims to have two blocks (Raniganj South block and Mannargudi block).

== Business operations ==
• Raniganj North Block: 1. Block has 2.6244 TCF gas in place 2. 156 drilled wells 3. Dedicated Pipeline of 77.62 km through the Asansol-Durgapur industrial belt

• Mannargudi Block: 1. It has 0.98 TCF Gas in place 2. Single seam up to 80m 3. Plan to initially drill 50 core wells and 30 pilot production wells

== Company officers and directors ==
On 23 September 2015 - Prashant Modi - Great Eastern Energy Corp Ltd (GEECL) announced the appointment of Prashant Modi as its new managing director and chief executive officer.

Prashant Modi was president and chief operating officer of the company, which produces natural gas from coal seams (coal bed methane or CBM) in West Bengal.

Prashant Modi takes over the new role from his father, Yogendra Kumar Modi, who was the chairman and CEO of the company.

Other Officers

- Yogendra Modi
- Ashok Jha
- S. Sundareshan
- Gurvirendra Singh Talwar
- Paul Zuckerman
- S. Suriyanarayanan

== London Stock Exchange ==
As the only Indian company to have its primary listing on London Stock Exchange, GEECL managed to establish its reputation on a global level. The revenue of the company in 2010 was $2.47 million, which has increased to $33.79 million in 2014. Along with this, GEECL has also reflected a growth in Earnings per share, from -$0.148 in 2010 to $0.17 in 2014. On 21 April 2023 GEECL voluntarily delisted from the London Stock Exchange, stating that the volume of trading of the GDRs on the LSE was negligible and did not justify the costs related to such listing and trading.
