= R. C. Sakthi =

Indian film director (1940–2015)

- Born: 15 August 1940; Puzhuthikulam, Paramakudi, Ramanathapuram, Tamil Nadu, India
- Died: 23 February 2015 (aged 74)
- Occupations: Film director, actor
- Years active: 1976–1993
- Children: 3

R. C. Sakthi (26 March 1940 – 23 February 2015) was an Indian film director and actor. He launched Kamal Haasan as a lead actor in Unarchigal, and also working with Rajinikanth in Dharma Yuddham and Vijayakanth in Manakanakku.

== Early life ==
Sakthi was born to the couple Selvam and Lakshmi at Puzhuthikulam, a hamlet near Paramakudi of Ramanathapuram district. His father Selvam was in the police department. Sakthi was not much interested in studies; he evinced great interest in acting since his early years. He started a drama company along with his friends and staged his first play ‘Vaazhkai vaazhvatharkae’ in which he donned the role of the villain. The entire village appreciated the play and Sakthi's acting and encouraged him to try his luck in cinema. Sakthi arrived at Chennai with dreams of entering cinema. But he could get only minor roles in some amateur drama troupes and he was not happy.

== Career ==
He came to Chennai and joined as an assistant to ‘Villupaattu’ Subbhu Aarumugam of the NSK troupe who was also working as a scriptwriter and, Sakthi was doing roles in stage plays too. At that point, he got the opportunity to work as assistant director for the Tamil film ‘Porsilai’. He became close to Thangappan, the dance master of the film. He told Sakthi that he had plans to produce a film titled ‘Annai Velankanni’ and he insisted that Sakthi should be part of the project. Sakthi worked with the team of Annai Velankanni (1970) as an assistant director, while learning the art of scriptwriting. Sakthi launched his first directorial venture in 1972, Unarchigal, a new age film which dealt with sexually transmitted diseases as the main storyline. The film was also initially supposed to launch Kamal Haasan as a lead actor, however, delays meant that the film was only released 4 years later in 1976. They soon collaborated again in Manidharil Ithanai Nirangala (1978) and have remained close aides since. He later also went on to make the Rajinikanth-Sridevi starrer Dharma Yuddham, a revenge saga which released in 1979. However, after a promising start, Sakthi began to work on films with smaller budgets and his films failed to become as successful or as high profile as his initial ventures with Kamal Haasan and Rajinikanth. Kamal Haasan later refused to work in Sakthi's Manakanakku (1985), but later agreed to make a cameo appearance in the Vijayakanth starrer. His last directorial venture was Pathini Penn in 1993, after a film titled Iththanai Naal Yengirundhaai? starring Babu Ganesh and Khushbu was shelved after a single schedule in 1997, later he directed a telefilm called Manitha Iyanthiram starring Charu Haasan, director Gajendran and his first grandson Sai Ajeet Kumar it also got appreciation from the industry and his close friend Kamal Haasan.

He moved on to play supporting roles in films, notably being selected by Kamal Haasan to portray a role in his directorial venture Marudhanayagam in 1998, before the film was shelved. He went on to work in Ponvannan's Jameela (2002) and then in Sivakumar's Urumaatram (2003), winning critical acclaim for his portrayal. A critic noted Sakthi as Thangavelu is "excellent " and his "eyes and body language amply reveal much more than what words can".

Sakthi was reported to be in a critical condition in December 2011 following a kidney problem and was shifted to a private hospital, but soon went on to make a full recovery. In December 2013, Sakthi collaborated again with Kamal Haasan, with the latter writing and singing a song for Sakthi's short film Ainthu Rojakkal which was produced by his son in law Ramaprabhu. The venture starred Sakthi's grandson Sai Ajeet Kumar, Sai Pranav, Nitesh and granddaughters Sai Harshatha and Nivietha in the lead and is about how social evils and violence have affected children.

== Death ==
Sakthi died on 23 February 2015 at the age of 74. Sakthi is survived by his wife with two daughters and a son.

== Filmography ==
Year	Film	Notes
1976	Unarchigal	
1978	Manidharil Ithanai Nirangala!	
1979	Dharma Yuddham	
1979	Mambazhathu Vandu	
1981	Rajangam	
1982	Sparisam	
1983	Unmaigal	
1984	Sirai	
1984	Thanga Koppai	
1985	Naam	
1985	Santhosha Kanavukal	
1985	Thavam	
1986	Manakanakku	
1987	Koottu Puzhukkal	
1987	Thalidhaanam	
1989	Varam	
1990	Amma Pillai	
1993	Pathini Penn	Tamil Nadu State Film Award for Best Film; Tamil Nadu State Film Award for Best Dialogue Writer

As actor

- Urumattram
