= Kalakadu block =

Kalakadu block is a revenue block in the Tirunelveli district of Tamil Nadu, India. It has a total of 17 panchayat villages.
