= Unarchigal (1976 film) =

- Theatrical release poster
- Directed by: R. C. Sakthi
- Written by: R. C. Sakthi; Kamal Haasan
- Produced by: K.L. Bose; M. Sardhar; Rameesa Ashraf
- Starring: Kamal Haasan; Srividya
- Cinematography: R. N. Pillai
- Edited by: G. Kalyanasundaram
- Music by: Shyam
- Release date: 25 June 1976
- Running time: 122 minutes
- Country: India
- Language: Tamil

Unarchigal (transl. Feelings) is a 1976 Indian Tamil-language film co-written and directed by R. C. Sakthi in his directorial debut. The film stars Kamal Haasan and Srividya. It is a highly sensuous film which deals with sexually transmitted diseases, and subsequently the film ran into trouble with the censor board, prompting a delay in its release. The film was remade in Malayalam as Raasaleela which released in 1975, before the original.

== Plot ==
Muthu is an 18-year-old simpleton who works in a small village. He is sexually harassed by his landlord's sister, a widow. Unable to bear it any longer, Muthu goes to Madras. However, he is again harassed in a similar way by people whom he meets. He finds work at a hotel as a room boy where he meets Maragadham, a prostitute. After he rescues her once during a police raid, she develops a soft spot for him. He lives in Maragadham's house as a servant but later is thrown out of her home. In the end Muthu gets affected by an STD and is shown in a hospital being treated by a doctor and eventually dies.

== Cast ==
- Kamal Haasan as Muthu
- L. Kanchana as Kamala
- Srividya as Maragadham
- Major Sundarrajan as Doctor
- Lalithasree as a prostitute
- S. V. Ramadas as Bhoopathy
- V. Gopalakrishnan as Balu
- K. K. Soundar as Police Inspector
- Vellai Subbaiah as Subbiah

== Production ==
The story was written by R. C. Sakthi and Kamal Haasan. Additionally, Haasan worked as assistant director also. The film was initially supposed to be Haasan's first film as a lead actor after being launched in 1972, however delays meant that the film was only released four years later. The same film was later remade in Malayalam as Raasaleela and released in 1975, before the original had come out.

== Soundtrack ==
All Songs are written by Kannadasan, Pattukottai Dhandayuthapani, Velavendhan, Muthulingam.

Title	Singer(s)	Length
"Nenjathil Poradum"	S. P. Balasubrahmanyam, S. Janaki	4:20
"Un Aasaiya"	Shyam	4:13
"Naan Yenna Cheyiden"	Various	2:24
"Alainthidum Naan"	S. Janaki, P. Susheela	5:00

== Reception ==
Kanthan of Kalki praised the performances of cast, called Sakthi's dialogues as thought provoking but felt the story died in the beginning itself. He also felt Raasaleela did not have any disease and questioned for adding this change in Tamil and concluded did makers thought that Tamil audience lack emotions.
