= Dharma Yuddham =

1979 film by R. C. Sakthi

- Theatrical release poster
- Directed by: R. C. Sakthi
- Story by: Peter Selvakumar
- Produced by: T. R. Srinivasan
- Starring: Rajinikanth; Sridevi; Thengai Srinivasan
- Cinematography: N. Balakrishnan
- Edited by: G. Radhakrishnan
- Music by: Ilaiyaraaja
- Production company: Charusuchithra Films
- Release date: 29 June 1979
- Running time: 134 minutes
- Country: India
- Language: Tamil

Dharma Yuddam (transl. War for honour) is a 1979 Indian Tamil-language action film directed by R. C. Sakthi. It stars Rajinikanth and Sridevi in the lead roles. The film was released on 29 June 1979.

== Plot ==
Vijay's parents are killed by Robert. He is adopted and brought up by Thiyagarajan. He comes to love Thiyagarajan's daughter as his own sister. He becomes a successful, soft-spoken, kind yet reclusive businessman and is sought by Chitra for an interview. He falls in love while Manju, and his sister falls in love with a photographer. Though initially against the match, Vijay realizes that his sister's lover is hardworking, sincere and is not after money. All seems to go well until one day Manju is found dead near the pier.

Robert, their family friend, is an illegal organ trader and sells custom requested eyes. He is the one who kidnapped and killed Manju. Vijay has a weakness. On full moon night, he has an alter-ego that takes over which is extremely violent, overtly strong and incredibly dangerous as it was the day he lost his biological family. This was Vijay's biggest secret which he hid from everybody except for Chithra, whom he trusted and loved. His adoptive father and later, his sister chain him up in a room to ensure he does not hurt others and more importantly himself.

When Vijay finds out that Robert has been stealing eyes and is responsible for all the deaths, he goes after him but is overpowered by Robert's henchmen. While Robert was completing his last ever deal, the full moon rises and Vijay, in his alter-ego, kills every single one of them in rage. He is acquitted both on account of his condition and that the deceased are criminals.

== Cast ==
- Rajinikanth as Vijay
- Sridevi as Chitra
- Manorama
- Thengai Srinivasan as Robert
- Major Sundarrajan as Thiyagarajan
- Suruli Rajan as Vijay's friend
- S. A. Ashokan as Azhagappan
- V. Gopalakrishnan as Dr. Amarnath
- Sachu as Geetha
- Pushpalatha as Chitra's mother
- S. R. Veeraraghavan as Ramanathan
- Jaggu as Henchman
- Lakshmi Sree as Manju
- Master Chandrasekar as Child vijay
- Y. G. Mahendran (guest appearance)
- Selvaraj
- Chakkaravarthi

== Soundtrack ==
The soundtrack was composed by Ilaiyaraaja. The song, "Oru Thanga Radhathil" is set in Mohanam raga and "Aagaya Gangai" is set in Madhyamavati.

Track listing
No.	Title	Lyrics	Singer(s)	Length
1.	"Oru Thanga Radhathil"	Kannadasan	Malaysia Vasudevan	4:27
2.	"Aagaya Gangai"	M. G. Vallabhan	Malaysia Vasudevan, S. Janaki	4:38
3.	"Ada Poya"	Kannadasan	S. P. Sailaja	4:45
4.	"Disco Sound"	Hari	Hari, Ramola	3:34
Total length:				17:24

== Medical accuracy ==
Daniel, a consulting psychiatrist, criticised the lead character's condition, that he becomes invincible and violent on a full moon night, as a medically inaccurate myth, noting its similarities to werewolf theories.
