= B. Sivakumar (director) =

Indian film director

B.Sivakumar
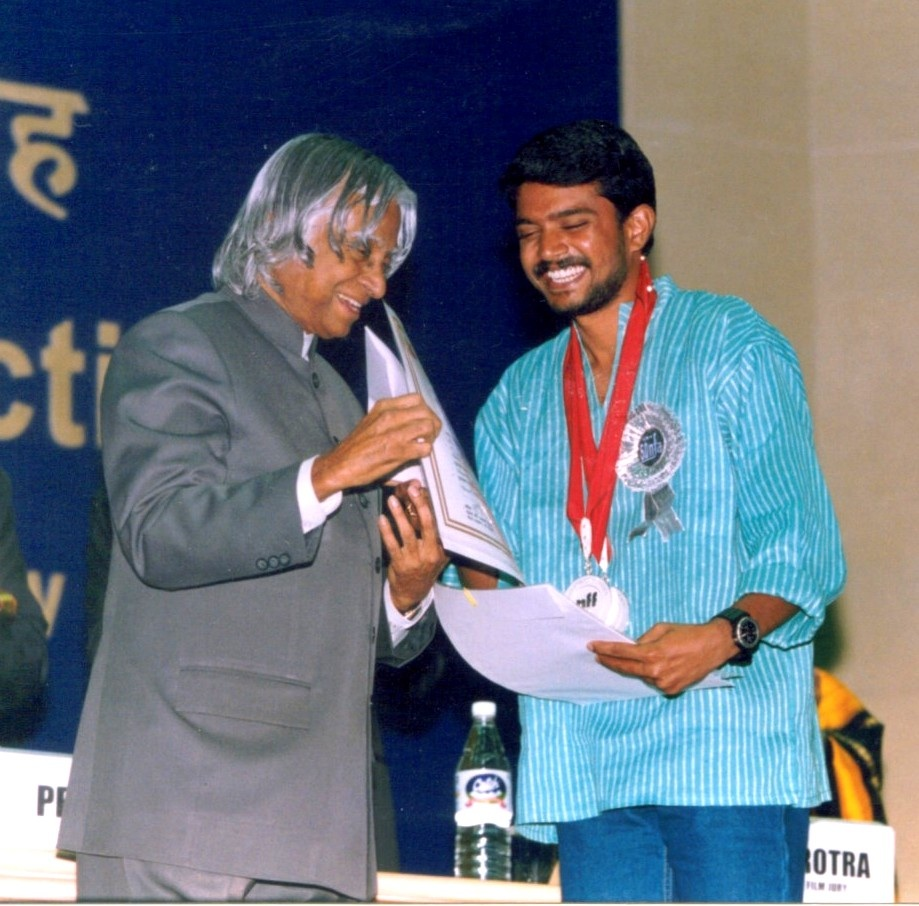
- National award for Urumattram
- Born: Cuddalore, Tamil Nadu
- Occupation: Film Director
- Notable work: Urumattram

B.Sivakumar is an Indian director of several Tamil short films.

== Career ==
He entered the film industry as an assistant director, and has worked with Ravichandran in Kannedhirey Thondrinal, Kanave Kalaiyadhe and Janaki Viswanathan in Kutty. He has also made commercial advertisements. His debut film as a director, Aayeeshaa, won best short film at London in 2001 by Cine Sangam, and second best short film at the 7th Mumbai International Film Festival 2002. It was screened at the International Children Film Festival 2001 held in Hyderabad, and the Indian Panorama in 2002.

His second short film in 2002, Urumattram won the National Film Award for Best Non-Feature Environment/Conservation/Preservation Film..

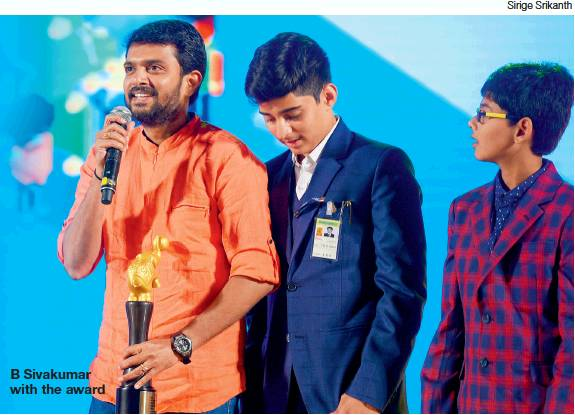
Asian Panorama Shorts Award for Stamp album

He received two awards at the 20th International Children's Film Festival India (ICFFI), winning the Best Short Films and Special Jury Prizes for the short, Stamp Album, based on a story by Sundara Ramaswamy.

He is currently working as a co-director with Veteran playback Singer, Actor and Producer SPB Charan for an upcoming web series "ADHIGARAM" (Under Production)

== Filmography ==
Year	Film	Credited as		Language	Awards
Year	Film	Director	Actor	Language	Awards
2001	Aayeeshaa - Short Film - 30 mins - 35mm	✓	✗	Tamil	Best Short Film - London Cine Sangam 2001. Best Second Short Film at 7th Mumbai International Film Festival 2002. Nominated, Screened at International competitive Section: 12th International Children's Film Festival 2001 held at Hyderabad.
2003	Urumattram - Short Film - 30 mins - 35mm	✓	✗	Tamil	Screened at International Environmental film Festival, VFICA, held at BRAZIL, 2003. Special invite at International SASA Awards 2003, ROME. Selected for Vatavaran, 2003. Best short film at New Jersey international film Festival, 2004. National Film Award for Best Non-Feature Environment/Conservation/Preservation Film
2005	Vellai poonai - Short Film -13 mins - 35mm	✓	✗	Tamil	Best Short Film and Best Director at Canada Tamil International Film Festival 2005.
2005	Chellamma - Short Film - 55 mins - 35mm	✓	✗	Tamil	Best Short Fiction Film at New York International Independent Film Festival, Las Vegas, 2005. Officially selected for The Golden Walnut International Film Festival, Serbia, 2005
2006	The power of silence - 3D animation- 10 mins	✓	✗	Tamil	Screened at 4th International Animation Festival- Turkey.
2017	Stamp album - Short Film	✓	✗	Tamil	Won Best Asian Panorama Shorts and Special Jury award at the 20th International Children's Film Festival 2017. Best Jury award at 2nd Indian World Film Festival 2018; Special Screening at National level Stamp Exhibition Delhi.
