= Anuradha Ramanan =

Tamil writer, artist and social activist (1947–2010)

- Born: 29 June 1947; Thanjavur, Madras Presidency, British India
- Died: 16 May 2010 (aged 62); Chennai, Tamil Nadu, India
- Occupations: Writer, novelist, artist, social activist, Columnist (800 novels and 1,230 short stories)
- Spouse: Ramanan Neelakanta Iyer (m. 1965)
- Children: 2 - Sudha Ramanan(USA), Subha Ramanan(USA)
- Writing career
- Period: 1977—2010
- Genre: Tamizh contemporary
- Subject: Social
- Notable awards: Gold medal for the best short story from Ananda Vikatan, Oru Veedu Iru Vasal National Film Award for Best Film on Other Social Issues, Oka Bhaarya Katha won five Nandi Awards, gold medal by M. G. Ramachandran, the then Chief Minister of Tamil Nadu.

Anuradha Ramanan (29 June 1947 – 16 May 2010) was a Tamil writer, artist and a social activist.

== Early life ==
Anuradha was born in 1947 in Thanjavur, Tamil Nadu. Her grandfather R. Balasubramaniam was an actor who inspired Anuradha to become a writer. Anuradha started her career as an artist before making several unsuccessful attempts to get a job with popular magazines. This prompted her to join Mangai, a Tamil magazine after the editor found her writings very interesting.

== Career ==
Anuradha's literary career started in 1977 while working for the magazine. She also revealed the sexual harresment allegations about Jayendra Saraswathi.

Apart from her literary contributions, she was well known for her "anti-divorce counselling" work. In a career that spanned over 30 years, Anuradha wrote nearly 800 novels and 1,230 short stories. Her works were mainly centered on family and everyday happenings. One of her early works Sirai, won a gold medal for the best short story from Ananda Vikatan. It was adapted into a film of the same name. Following this, her other novels Koottu Puzhukkal, Oru Malarin Payanam and Oru Veedu Iruvasal were adapted into films in various languages such as Tamil, Telugu and Kannada. Oru Veedu Iru Vasal, directed by Balachander won the National Film Award for Best Film on Other Social Issues in 1991. The 1988 Telugu film Oka Baarya Katha based on her work won five Nandi Awards. In addition to films, many of her stories such as Archanai Pookal, Paasam and Kanakanden Thozhi have been adapted into television serials. She was awarded a gold medal by M. G. Ramachandran, the then Chief Minister of Tamil Nadu.

== Death ==
Anuradha died of cardiac arrest on 16 May 2010 at the age of 62 in Chennai. She was married to Ramanan and has two daughters.

== Controversy ==
=== Sexual harassment allegations against Jayendra Saraswati ===
Anuradha Ramanan said she was subjected to sexual harresment by Jayendra Saraswati when she met back in 1992, when she was taken to negotiate the release of the spiritual magazine "Amma" by the muth. Anuradha Ramanan has charged Saraswathi of making sexual advances. He said that during their first meeting, he spoke about the proposed journal and offered to make her its editor, Ramanan agreed to the offer. During their final meeting, she said, he began using indecent language, and when she looked up from the notebook, the woman who took me to him was in a sexually intimate position with him. She said that the Saraswathi "approached" her, and when she objected, the other woman tried to persuade her of her "good fortune." When she left the place, the Shankaracharya allegedly asserted that she keep her mouth shut.

Ramanan said that she had met a female police officer who was close to her to lodge a complaint, but did not do so because she feared for the future of her daughters. She reported that an attempted murder had been made against her. She said a truck hit her car in which she was travelling and a further attempt was made on her life when she was admitted to the hospital. In December 2004, she said she would have met with the same fate as that of Sankararaman if she had made the disclosure 12 years ago when the alleged incident took place.
