= National Film Award for Best Assamese Feature Film =

Indian film award

- National award for contributions to Indian Cinema
- Awarded for: Best Assamese feature film of the year
- Sponsored by: National Film Development Corporation of India
- Formerly called: President's Silver Medal for Best Feature Film in Assamese (1955–1968); National Film Award for Best Feature Film in Assamese (1969–2021)
- Rewards: Rajat Kamal (Silver Lotus); ₹2,00,000
- First award: 1955
- Most recent winner: Juiphool (2024)

The National Film Award for Best Assamese Feature Film is one of the National Film Awards presented annually by the National Film Development Corporation of India. It is one of several awards presented for feature films and awarded with Rajat Kamal (Silver Lotus).

The National Film Awards, established in 1954, are the most prominent film awards in India that merit the best of the Indian cinema. The ceremony also presents awards for films in various regional languages.

The films made in Assamese language were not considered until the 3rd National Film Awards ceremony held in September 1956. However, only Certificate of Merit was issued in this ceremony as no film was found suitable for the "President's Silver Medal". The 1955 Phani Sarma directorial film Piyali Phukan received the first Certificate of Merit. Later in the 6th National Film Awards the 1958 film Ronga Police, directed by Nip Barua, became the first film to receive the president's silver medal for Best Feature Film in Assamese. Since the 70th National Film Awards, the name was changed to "Best Assamese Feature Film".

== Winners ==
Award includes 'Rajat Kamal' (Silver Lotus Award) and cash prize. Following are the award winners over the years:

Awards legends
*	President's Silver Medal for Best Feature Film
*	Certificate of Merit for the Best Feature Film

List of award films, showing the year (award ceremony), producer(s) and director(s)
Year	Film(s)	Producer(s)	Director(s)	Refs.
1955 (3rd)	Piyali Phukan	Rupajyoti Productions	Phani Sarma	
1956 (4th)	No Award			
1957 (5th)	Maak Aru Morom	Brajen Barua	Nip Barua	
1958 (6th)	Ronga Police	Kanak Ch. Sharma	Nip Barua	
1959 (7th)	Puberun	K. C. Roy and Paji Doss	Prabhat Mukherjee	
1960 (8th)	No Award			
1961 (9th)	Shakuntala	Kamrup Chitra	Bhupen Hazarika	
1962 (10th)	Tezimola	Anwar Hussain	Anwar Husaain	
1963 (11th)	Maniram Devan	Apurba Chowdhury	S. Chakravarty	
1964 (12th)	Pratidhwani	Kamrup Chitra	Bhupen Hazarika	
1965 (13th)	No Award			
1966 (14th)	Lotighoti		Bhupen Hazarika	
1967 (15th)	No Award			
1968 (16th)	No Award			
1969 (17th)	Dr. Bezbarua	M/s Rangghar Cine Productions	Brajen Baruah	
1970 (18th)	No Award			
1971 (19th)	Aranya	United Productions	Samarendra Narayan Deb	
1972 (20th)	Opaja Sonar Mati	M/s Pragati Cine Productions	Brajen Barua	
1973 (21st)	Mamta	Nalin Dowerah, Prafulla Dutta and Shiba Thakur	Nalin Dowerah	
1974 (22nd)	No Award			
1975 (23rd)	Chameli Memsaab	Seuj Bolechari Santha	Abdul Majid	
1976 (24th)	Putala Ghor		Samarendra Narayan Dev	
1977 (25th)	Sandhyarag	Bhabendra Nath Saikia	Bhabendra Nath Saikia	
1978 (26th)	No Award			
1979 (27th)	Kallol		Atul Borgoloi	
1980 (28th)	Anirban	Preeti Saikia	Bhabendra Nath Saikia	
1981 (29th)	No Award			
1982 (30th)	Aparoopa	Jahnu Barua	Jahnu Barua	
1983 (31st)	Alokar Ahban	Do-Re-Me Films	Kamal Hazarika	
1984 (32nd)	Son Maina	R. B. Mehta, M. P. N. Nair and Shiv Prasad Thakur	Shiv Prasad Thakur	
1985 (33rd)	Agnisnaan	Bhabendra Nath Saikia	Bhabendra Nath Saikia	
1986 (34th)	Baan	Do-Re-Me Films	Charu Kamal Hazarika	
1987 (35th)	Pratham Ragini	S. N. Bora	Dhiru Bhuyan	
1988 (36th)	Kolahal	Bhabendra Nath Saikia	Bhabendra Nath Saikia	
1989 (37th)	No Award			
1990 (38th)	Jooj	Bipul Baruah	Hemen Das	
1991 (39th)	Sarothi	Bhabendra Nath Saikia	Bhabendra Nath Saikia	
1992 (40th)	Railor Alir Dubori Ban	Pulak Gogoi	Pulak Gogoi	
1993 (41st)	Abartan	Bhabendra Nath Saikia	Bhabendra Nath Saikia	
1994 (42nd)	Xagoroloi Bohudoor	Sailadhar Baruah and Jahnu Barua	Jahnu Barua	
1995 (43rd)	Itihas	Leena Bora	Bhabendra Nath Saikia	
1996 (44th)	Adajya	Nayan Prasad	Santwana Bardoloi	
1997 (45th)	No Award			
1998 (46th)	Kuhkal	Dolphin Communications	Jahnu Barua	
1999 (47th)	Pokhi	Dolphin Communications	Jahnu Barua	
2000 (48th)	No Award			
2001 (49th)	No Award			
2002 (50th)	Konikar Ramdhenu	Sailadhar Baruah	Jahnu Barua	
2003 (51st)	Akashitarar Kathare	Sangeeta Tamuli	Manju Borah	
2004 (52nd)	Dinabandhoo	Krishna Roy	Munin Barua	
2005 (53rd)	Kadamtole Krishna Nache	Suman Haripriya	Suman Haripriya	
2006 (54th)	Aaideu	Nabomika Borthakur	Arup Manna	
2007 (55th)	No Award			
2008 (56th)	Mon Jaai	Moirangthem Movies	M. Maniram	
2009 (57th)	Basundhara	Hiren Bora	Hiren Bora	
2010 (58th)	Jetuka Pator Dore	Md. Noorul Sultan	Jadumoni Dutta	
2011 (59th)	No Award			
2012 (60th)	Baandhon	Assam State Film (Finance and Development) Corporation Ltd.	Jahnu Barua	
2013 (61st)	Ajeyo	Shiven Arts	Jahnu Barua	
2014 (62nd)	Othello	Artha Films	Hemanta Kumar Das	
2015 (63rd)	Kothanodi	Anurupa Hazarika	Bhaskar Hazarika	
2016 (64th)	Maj Rati Keteki	Udara Films	Santwana Bardoloi	
2017 (65th)	Ishu	Children's Film Society	Utpal Borpujari	
2018 (66th)	Bulbul Can Sing	Flying River Films	Rima Das	
2019 (67th)	Ronuwa: Who Never Surrender	Bornali Creative Vision Entertainment	Chandra Mudoi	
2020 (68th)	Bridge	Sabita Devi	Kripal Kalita	
2021 (69th)	Anur	Shivam Creation	Monjul Baruah	
2022 (70th)	Emuthi Puthi	Metanormal Motion Pictures Pvt Ltd	Kulanandini Mahanta	
2023 (71st)	Rongatapu 1982	BRC Cine Production	Adityam Saikia	
2024 (72nd)	Juiphool	Jadumoni Dutta	Jadumoni Dutta	
