= Film Appreciation on Cinemas (1990 to 2000) of Jahnu Barua: Women, Children, Political and Psychological Perspectives =

Book written by Juhi P. Pathak

- Author: Dr. Juhi P. Pathak
- Language: English
- Publisher: Redshine Publication
- ISBN: 978-1-387-44518-9
- Website: https://redshine.co.in/product/978-1-387-44518-9/

Film Appreciation on Cinemas (1990 to 2000) of Jahnu Barua: Women, Children, Political and Psychological Perspectives is a research book written by Dr. Juhi P. Pathak and published by Redshine Publication. The book is the second part of a trilogy on the works of Jahnu Barua, a prominent Assamese filmmaker.

== Overview ==
The book delves into the analysis and appreciation of four of Jahnu Barua's films released during the decade of 1990-2000, including "Firingoti," "Hkhagoroloi Bohu Door," "Kuhkhal," and "Pokhi".

"Firingoti," released in 1992, and portrayal of the cultural and societal prejudices faced by a widowed woman. The book delves into the themes of survival, gender roles, and the nuances of Assamese society.

"Hkhagoroloi Bohu Door," released in 1995, and explores the urban-rural divide and psychological underpinnings of Assamese society. The author highlighted the significance of child psychology in the film, which depicts the journey of a young boy from the city who visits his ancestral village and learns to appreciate the simpler things in life.

"Kuhkhal," released in 1998, and its themes of patriotism and human values. The film portrays the sacrifices of Kuhkhal Konwar, a little-known freedom fighter from Assam, and sheds light on his contributions to the Indian independence struggle. The socio-political climate of Assam during that time and its impact on the story analyzes in the second part.

"Pokhi," released in 2000, and its portrayal of a child's perspective of an adult world through the concept of "Child Gaze." The film follows the life of a young orphaned girl and her struggles to find her place in the world. The last chapter of the book delves into the psychological implications of the film and how it highlights the importance of empathy and compassion.

The book is expected to contribute to the understanding of Assamese culture and society while carrying a valuable message for the younger generation.

== See also ==
- Film Appreciation on Cinemas (1980 to 1990) of Jahnu Barua: Social, Economic, Political and Cultural Perspectives
- Jahnu Barua
