= 35th National Film Awards =

1988 Indian film award

- Awarded for: Best of Indian cinema in 1987
- Awarded by: Directorate of Film Festivals
- Presented by: R. Venkataraman (President of India)
- Presented on: April 1988
- Official website: dff.nic.in

Highlights
- Best Feature Film: Halodhia Choraye Baodhan Khai
- Best Non-Feature Film: Bhopal: Beyond Genocide
- Best Book: Kazhchayude Asanthi (Torments of Seeing)
- Best Film Critic: Brajeshwar Madan
- Dadasaheb Phalke Award: Raj Kapoor
- Most awards: • Anantaram • Nayakan • Tamas (3)

The 35th National Film Awards were presented by Directorate of Film Festivals, the organisation set up by Ministry of Information and Broadcasting, India to felicitate the best of Indian Cinema released in the year 1987. Ceremony took place in April 1988 and awards were given by then President of India, R. Venkataraman.

Starting with 35th National Film Awards, National Film Award for Best Direction for Feature films section is awarded with Swarna Kamal (Golden Lotus). In the non-feature films section, two new awards were instituted and awarded with Rajat Kamal (Silver Lotus) namely, Best Educational / Motivational Film and Best Short Fiction Film.

== Awards ==
Awards were divided into feature films, non-feature films and books written on Indian cinema.

=== Lifetime Achievement Award ===
Name of Award	Image	Awardee(s)	Awarded As	Awards
Dadasaheb Phalke Award		Raj Kapoor	Actor, Film director and Film producer	Swarna Kamal, ₹ 100,000 and a Shawl

=== Feature films ===
Feature films were awarded at All India as well as regional level. For 35th National Film Awards, an Assamese film, Halodhia Choraye Baodhan Khai won the National Film Award for Best Feature Film and a Malayalam film, Anantaram along with a Tamil film, Nayakan and a Hindi film, Tamas won the maximum number of awards (3). Following were the awards given in each category:

==== Juries ====
A committee headed by Shyam Benegal was appointed to evaluate the feature films awards. Following were the jury members:

- Jury Members
  - Shyam Benegal (Chairperson) • Abdul Majid • Amita Malik • Sowcar Janaki • Jaya Bachchan • Nachiket Patwardhan • B. S. Narayana • Pavithran • Sadhu Meher • Salil Chowdhury • Shaji N. Karun • U. S. Vadiraj

==== All India Award ====
Following were the awards given:

===== Golden Lotus Award =====
Official Name: Swarna Kamal

All the awardees are awarded with 'Golden Lotus Award (Swarna Kamal)', a certificate and cash prize.

Name of Award	Name of Film	Language	Awardee(s)	Cash prize
Best Feature Film	Halodhia Choraye Baodhan Khai	Assamese	Producer: Sailadhar Baruah and Jahnu Barua	₹ 50,000/-
Best Feature Film	Halodhia Choraye Baodhan Khai	Assamese	director: Jahnu Barua	₹ 25,000/-
Best Feature Film	Citation: For its mastery of cinematic form and the totality of its film craft and for its authentic depiction of the Indian rural problem and for the life affirmating human dignity it portrays in the face of the most trying social circumstances.			
Best Debut Film of a Director	Ekti Jiban	Bengali	Producer: Chalchitra; Director: Raja Mitra	₹ 25,000/- Each
Best Debut Film of a Director	Citation: For a very courageous first attempt of a director in tackling the subject of an individual unwavering in his conviction in the cultural value of his language and single handly making available its enriching value to the generation of his people who will come after him.			
Best Feature Film Providing Popular and Wholesome Entertainment	Pushpaka Vimana	Kannada	Producer:Singeetam Srinivasa Rao and Shringar Nagaraj	₹ 50,000/-
Best Feature Film Providing Popular and Wholesome Entertainment	Pushpaka Vimana	Kannada	Director: Singeetam Srinivasa Rao	₹ 25,000/-
Best Feature Film Providing Popular and Wholesome Entertainment	Citation: For its innovative approach to entertainment.			
Best Children's Film	Swamy	Hindi	Producer: T. S. Narasimhan	₹ 30,000/-
Best Children's Film	Swamy	Hindi	Director: Shankar Nag	₹ 15,000/-
Best Children's Film	Citation: For the delightful recreation of childhood and growing up in an Indian village during the freedom movement.			
Best Direction	Anantaram	Malayalam	Adoor Gopalakrishnan	₹ 25,000/-
Best Direction	Citation: For the exceptional mastery of the craft in dealing with a very complex and unusual subject for the cinema.			

===== Silver Lotus Award =====
Official Name: Rajat Kamal

All the awardees are awarded with 'Silver Lotus Award (Rajat Kamal)', a certificate and cash prize.

Name of Award	Name of Film	Language	Awardee(s)	Cash prize
Best Feature Film on National Integration	Tamas	Hindi	Producer: M/s Blaze Entertainment	₹ 30,000/-
Best Feature Film on National Integration	Tamas	Hindi	Director: Govind Nihalani	₹ 15,000/-
Best Feature Film on National Integration	Citation: For recreating without compromise the tragic events leading to the communal holocaust at the eve of partition in a Punjab village.			
Best Film on Other Social Issues	Ore Oru Gramathiley	Tamil	Producer: M/s Janani Arts Creations	₹ 30,000/-
Best Film on Other Social Issues	Ore Oru Gramathiley	Tamil	Director: Jyothipandian	₹ 15,000/-
Best Film on Other Social Issues	Vedham Pudhithu	Tamil	Producer: S. Rangarajan	₹ 30,000/-
Best Film on Other Social Issues	Vedham Pudhithu	Tamil	Director: Bharathiraja	₹ 15,000/-
Best Film on Other Social Issues	Citation: For tackling the problem of caste differences and discrimination from the opposite ends of the hierarchy in their own way in a convincing manner and for the rigorous statement they make and the solutions they offer.			
Best Actor	Nayakan	Tamil	Kamal Haasan	₹ 10,000/-
Best Actor	Citation: For his outstanding and moving portrayal of a multi-faceted character with subtle moral nuances played with total control and extraordinary histrionic skill.			
Best Actress	Veedu	Tamil	Archana	₹ 10,000/-
Best Actress	Citation: For the totally naturalistic portrayal of a middle class working woman faced with everyday tensions of living and her attempts to overcome the ever-increasing problems of urban life.			
Best Supporting Actor	Rithubhedam	Malayalam	Thilakan	₹ 10,000/-
Best Supporting Actor	Citation: For his sharp and incisive delineation of the immorality of a human being who is weak and mean.			
Best Supporting Actress	Tamas	Hindi	Surekha Sikri	₹ 10,000/-
Best Supporting Actress	Citation: For her compelling performance as a woman who has not lost her innate human goodness even under the most adverse and stressful conditions of the holocaust.			
Best Child Artist	Swamy	Hindi	Master Manjunath	₹ 10,000/-
Best Child Artist	Citation: For his utterly charming and delightful portrayal of a young school going village boy who is combination of innocence and mischief, pointing to the inherent natural wisdom of the young.			
Best Male Playback Singer	Unnikale Oru Kadha Parayam ("Unnikale Oru Kadha Parayam")	Malayalam	K. J. Yesudas	₹ 10,000/-
Best Male Playback Singer	Citation: For the vivacity and mellifluous rendering of the theme song, giving full and meaningful expression to the lyric.			
Best Female Playback Singer	Ijaazat ("Mera Kuchh Saamaan")	Hindi	Asha Bhosle	₹ 10,000/-
Best Female Playback Singer	Citation: For her rendition with high professional skill and expression, of the many nuances of emotion and meaning of the highly poetic lyrics.			
Best Cinematography	Nayakan	Tamil	P. C. Sreeram	₹ 15,000/-
Best Cinematography	Citation: For the precise interpretation in lighting and camera operation adding a very vital dimension to the narrative.			
Best Screenplay	Anantaram	Malayalam	Adoor Gopalakrishnan	₹ 10,000/-
Best Screenplay	Citation: For the precision in structuring a very complex narrative content requiring both exceptional dramatic and literary skills.			
Best Audiography	Anantaram	Malayalam	• P. Devadas • T. Krishnanunni • N. Harikumar	₹ 10,000/-
Best Audiography	Citation: For harnessing all the elements of sounds, music and silence to create a perfect complement to the visual design of the film.			
Best Editing	Vedham Pudhithu	Tamil	P. Mohanraj	₹ 10,000/-
Best Editing	Citation: For being able to find an original editing vocabulary appropriate to the story in order to create a perfect blend of narrational and motivating elements.			
Best Art Direction	Nayakan	Tamil	Thotta Tharani	₹ 10,000/-
Best Art Direction	Citation: For interpreting the visual content of the film as authentically as possible, both in the design and construction of the sets and the colour schemes, to create the appropriate atmosphere and character of the film.			
Best Costume Design	Pestonjee	Hindi	• Ramilla Patel • Mani Rabadi	₹ 10,000/-
Best Costume Design	Citation: For recreating the costumes of the period and the Parsi community with meticulous attention to detail, enhancing the quality of the film.			
Best Music Direction	Tamas	Hindi	Vanraj Bhatia	₹ 10,000/-
Best Music Direction	Citation: For creating a thematic score on a heroic scale through melody and complex harmonic arrangements of a symphonic character to stress the human anguish during the holocaust that followed partition, helping greatly in defining the tragic dimensions of the events.			
Best Lyrics	Ijaazat ("Mera Kuchh Saamaan")	Hindi	Gulzar	₹ 10,000/-
Best Lyrics	Citation: For an extremely elegant lyric using subtle similies and metaphors to express attachment, desire and parting and finally to serve as a definition to love within the context of the film.			
Special Jury Award			M. B. Sreenivasan (Posthumously)	₹ 10,000/-
Special Jury Award	Citation: For his contribution to a whole genre of film music, for promoting the welfare of technicians of all disciplines in the film industry and for pioneering choral music of a very high order and community singing on a national scale.			

==== Regional Awards ====
The award is given to best film in the regional languages in India.

Name of Award	Name of Film	Awardee(s)	Cash prize
Best Feature Film in Assamese	Pratham Ragini	Producer: S. N. Bora	₹ 20,000/-
Best Feature Film in Assamese	Pratham Ragini	Director: Dhiru Bhuyan	₹ 10,000/-
Best Feature Film in Assamese	Citation: For significant achievement as a first film in a region still young in cinema and for the portrayal of a young girl's courage and optimism in the face of great adversity and personal tragedy.		
Best Feature Film in Bengali	Antarjali Jatra	Producer: NFDC	₹ 20,000/-
Best Feature Film in Bengali	Antarjali Jatra	Director: Gautam Ghose	₹ 10,000/-
Best Feature Film in Bengali	Citation: For creating through an event of the early 19th century a universal parable of exploitation, life and death with an underlying faith in the inevitability of change.		
Best Feature Film in Hindi	Pestonjee	Producer: NFDC	₹ 20,000/-
Best Feature Film in Hindi	Pestonjee	Director: Vijaya Mehta	₹ 10,000/-
Best Feature Film in Hindi	Citation: For creating an exquisite and gentle tale full of irony, stressing the universal need for human companionship, loyalty and acceptance of life.		
Best Feature Film in Kannada	Kadina Benki	Producer: M/s Manasa Arts	₹ 20,000/-
Best Feature Film in Kannada	Kadina Benki	Director: Suresh Heblikar	₹ 10,000/-
Best Feature Film in Kannada	Citation: For its sincerity in its attempt to delve into the problem of marital discords due to psychological imbalance in an artistic manner.		
Best Feature Film in Malayalam	Purushartham	Producer: P. T. K. Mohammad	₹ 20,000/-
Best Feature Film in Malayalam	Purushartham	Director: K. R. Mohanan	₹ 10,000/-
Best Feature Film in Malayalam	Citation: For creating highly disciplined work of great formal quality of a little boy's discovery of his dead father's environment and his eventual alienation from his mother.		
Best Feature Film in Marathi	Sarja	Producer: Seema Deo	₹ 20,000/-
Best Feature Film in Marathi	Sarja	Director: Rajdutt	₹ 10,000/-
Best Feature Film in Marathi	Citation: For its patriotic vigour in the retelling of a story set during the turbulent times of Shivaji.		
Best Feature Film in Oriya	Nishidhdha Swapna	Producer: Manmohan Mahapatra	₹ 20,000/-
Best Feature Film in Oriya	Nishidhdha Swapna	Director: Manmohan Mahapatra	₹ 10,000/-
Best Feature Film in Oriya	Citation: For its uncompromising technique in objectively observing in life of a family in an Oriya village defining the attitudes, motivations, hopes and disillusionment of each one in the context of social change of which they are all a part.		
Best Feature Film in Tamil	Veedu	Producer: Kaladas	₹ 20,000/-
Best Feature Film in Tamil	Veedu	Director: Balu Mahendra	₹ 10,000/-
Best Feature Film in Tamil	Citation: For a deeply compassionate portrayal of a middle class working woman with an old grandfather and sister as her dependents, attempting to retain the integrity of her family in the present day urban milieu.		

=== Non-Feature Films ===
Short Films made in any Indian language and certified by the Central Board of Film Certification as a documentary/newsreel/fiction are eligible for non-feature film section.

==== Juries ====
A committee headed by Buddhadeb Dasgupta was appointed to evaluate the non-feature films awards. Following were the jury members:

- Jury Members
  - Buddhadeb Dasgupta (Chairperson) • K. K. Kapil • N. Lakshminarayan • K. Viswanath • Ram Mohan

==== Golden Lotus Award ====
Official Name: Swarna Kamal

All the awardees are awarded with 'Golden Lotus Award (Swarna Kamal)', a certificate and cash prize.

Name of Award	Name of Film	Language	Awardee(s)	Cash prize
Best Non-Feature Film	Bhopal: Beyond Genocide	English	Producer: Cinemart Foundation; Director: Tapan Bose, Suhasini Mulay and Salim Shaikh	₹ 25,000/- Each
Best Non-Feature Film	Citation: For its sincere, conscientious study of a very important socio-technological issue of recent times, which explores its subject with a multi-faceted and humanistic approach.			

==== Silver Lotus Award ====
Official Name: Rajat Kamal

All the awardees are awarded with 'Silver Lotus Award (Rajat Kamal)' and cash prize.

Name of Award	Name of Film	Language	Awardee(s)	Cash prize
Best Anthropological / Ethnographic Film	Raaste Band Hain Sab	Hindi	Producer: Manjiri Dingwaney, Rural Labour Cell; Director: Manjiri Dutta	₹ 10,000/- Each
Best Anthropological / Ethnographic Film	Citation: For dealing with an old issue such as caste-ism in a profound cinematic style, wherein the leitm of it of the exploitation of man by man and its consequences for the present are never lost track of.			
Best Biographical Film	Basheer – The Man	English	Producer: Kannakulam Abdulla; Director: M. R. Rahman	₹ 10,000/- Each
Best Biographical Film	Citation: For its presentation of a relatively unknown literary personality through a fresh, spontaneous, uninhibited portrayal that brings out the complexity of an unconventional individual, rich in wit and worldly wisdom .			
Best Arts / Cultural Film	The Kingdom of God	English	Producer: Shilpabharati Publicity; Director: Ranabir Ray	₹ 10,000/- Each
Best Arts / Cultural Film	Citation: For treating its subject with careful cinematic detail and with a deep sincerity towards the very rich folk painting scene in rural India.			
Best Scientific Film (including Environment and Ecology)	A Cooperative for Snake Catchers	English	Producer: Eco Media Pvt Ltd; Director: Romulus Whitaker and Shekar Dattatri	₹ 10,000/- Each
Best Scientific Film (including Environment and Ecology)	Citation: For informative portrayal of concepts such as the use of traditional skills and knowledge existing in a tribal society for the common good, indirectly spreading a scientific temper all around.			
Best Industrial Film	Golden Muga Silk – The Cultural Heritage of Assam	English	Producer: Director (NE), Central Silk Board, Assam; Director: Siba Prasad Thakur	₹ 10,000/- Each
Best Industrial Film	Citation: For its exhaustive and well researched analysis of Assam's traditional sericulture industry and factors that have contributed to its survival and growth.			
Best Industrial Film	Looking Back	English	Producer: Drishtikon Productions for Films Division; Director: Prakash Jha	₹ 10,000/- Each
Best Industrial Film	Citation: For depicting the highly technical area of the contemporary industrial scene with sophistication and style.			
Best Agricultural Film	Angora For Wool	English	Producer: D. Gautaman for Films Division; Director: K. Jagjivan Ram	₹ 10,000/- Each
Best Agricultural Film	Citation: For its simplicity and straightforwardness in advising the people of hilly region to adopt the comparatively new and remunerative occupation of rearing angora rabbits for their wool.			
Best Historical Reconstruction / Compilation Film	The Story of Delhi	English	Producer: Serbjeet International for Films Division; Director: Serbjeet Singh	₹ 10,000/- Each
Best Historical Reconstruction / Compilation Film	Citation: For its aesthetic and innovative presentation of architectural history of a great capital city, giving the viewer the sense of being a participant observer in its evolution and thus a sense of pride in belonging to such a city.			
Best Film on Social Issues	Sankalp	Hindi	Producer: Madhya Pradesh Film Development Corporation Ltd. Director: Rajendra Janglay	₹ 10,000/- Each
Best Film on Social Issues	Citation: For rendering in a poetic, at the same time, sociological manner, the ordinary theme of the construction of a dam, its allied good and its consequences that would be the harbinger of progress.			
Best Educational / Motivational Film	Paani	Marathi	Producer and Director: Sumitra Bhave	₹ 10,000/- Each
Best Educational / Motivational Film	Citation: For expounding that self help is the best help and that solutions to individual problems of those of a society can be initiated and completed successfully, even within the development process.			
Best Exploration / Adventure Film	Antarctica – A Continuing Mystery (News Magazine No: 101)	English	Producer: Vijay B. Chandra for Films Division; Cameraman: Mahesh Kamble	₹ 10,000/- Each
Best Exploration / Adventure Film	Citation: For its daring and poetic coverage of scientific experiments carried out in Antarctica.			
Best News Review	Colours of Life (News Magazine No: 100)	English	Producer: Pritam S. Arshi for Films Division; Cameraman: Mahesh P. Sinha and Sant Lal Prasad	₹ 10,000/- Each
Best News Review	Citation: For bringing out the message that the disabled can also live and work like others through narration of the successful human story of a handicapped artist Jayantilal Shihora, who paints holding brush in his mouth.			
Best Animation Film	End Game	English	Producer: B. R. Shendge for Films Division director and Animator: Arun Gongade	₹ 10,000/- Each
Best Animation Film	Citation: For effectively using the medium of animation to make a visual metaphor come live, the shadow of nuclear annihilation looms over the world as superpowers play a deadly game which has no winners.			
Best Short Fiction Film	The Eight Column Affair	English	Producer: Film and Television Institute of India; Director: Sriram Raghavan	₹ 10,000/- Each
Best Short Fiction Film	Citation: For its innovative use of cinematic techniques to put together a surrealistic collage of visual that add up to a delightfully brisk narrative, full of whimsical humour.			
Special Jury Award	Barren Harvest	English	Rajiv Mehrotra	₹ 8,000/-
Special Jury Award	Citation: For his creative and sensitive handling of the serious iodine deficiency in flood prone areas of Eastern UP.			
Special Mention	The Kingdom of God	English	Ashok Gunjal (Cameraman)	Certificate only
Special Mention	Citation: For his aesthetically pleasing and technically proficient camerawork.			

=== Best Writing on Cinema ===
The awards aim at encouraging study and appreciation of cinema as an art form and dissemination of information and critical appreciation of this art-form through publication of books, articles, reviews etc.

==== Juries ====
A committee headed by Sunil Ganguly was appointed to evaluate the writing on Indian cinema. Following were the jury members:

- Jury Members
  - Sunil Ganguly (Chairperson) • Manarcad Mathew • K. L. Nandan

==== Silver Lotus Award ====
Official Name: Rajat Kamal

All the awardees are awarded with 'Silver Lotus Award (Rajat Kamal)' and cash prize.

Name of Award	Name of Book	Language	Awardee(s)	Cash prize
Best Book on Cinema	Kazhchayude Asanthi (Torments of Seeing)	Malayalam	Author: V. Rajakrishnan	₹ 10,000/-
Best Book on Cinema	Citation: For focussing of major trends and impulses in National and International cinemam, for promoting the appreciation of cinema as a serious art form, for underlining the relevance of cinema in the depiction of the basic concerns of present day society.			
Best Film Critic		Hindi	Brajeshwar Madan	₹ 5,000/-
Best Film Critic	Citation: For his indepth approach to film appreciation, not limited solely to film reviewing, but extending to the wider aspects of film making and analysing the theme and treatment of the films for their social relevance.			

=== Awards not given ===
Following were the awards not given as no film was found to be suitable for the award:

- Second Best Feature Film
- Best Feature Film in English
- Best Film on Family Welfare
- Best Feature Film in Manipuri
- Best Feature Film in Punjabi
- Best Feature Film in Telugu
- Best Non-feature Film on Family Welfare
- Best Promotional Film
