= Film Appreciation on Cinemas (1980 to 1990) of Jahnu Barua: Social, Economic, Political and Cultural Perspectives =

2022 book

- Author: Juhi P. Pathak
- Publisher: REDSHINE Publication
- Publication date: Jan 24, 2022
- ISBN: 978-93-90937-20-2

Film Appreciation on Cinemas of Jahnu Barua: Social, Economic, Political and Cultural Perspectives (1980-1990) is a research book written by Dr. Juhi P. Pathak and publish by Redshine Publication. The book is an exploration of the works of Jahnu Barua, a renowned Indian film director who has made significant contributions to Assamese and Hindi cinema.

== Overview ==
The book examines the social, economic, political, and cultural perspectives that are presented in Jahnu Barua's films during the 1980s and 1990s. The author provides an in-depth analysis of each film, highlighting the themes and issues that are explored in them. The book also sheds light on Jahnu Barua's filmmaking techniques and how they contribute to the overall impact of his films.

The book is divided into four chapters that explore different aspects of Barua's films, ‘Aparoopa’ ‘Papori’, 'Halodhia Choraye Baodhan Khai', Bonani’.

"Aparoopa" (1982) is Jahnu Barua's directorial debut and tells the story of a young couple, Hari and Hemnalini, who struggle to make ends meet in Guwahati. The film explores themes of love, relationships, and societal pressures. Dr. Pathak analyzes how the film portrays the middle-class struggles and anxieties of the time.

"Papori" (1986) is a film that deals with the theme of child marriage. The film portrays the story of a young girl, Papori, who is married off at a young age. Dr. Pathak examines how the film challenges the patriarchal norms and the oppressive social practices.

"Halodhia Choraye Baodhan Khai" (1987) is a film that is often regarded as a classic in Assamese cinema. The film portrays the struggles of a poor farmer and his family in rural Assam during the 1980s. The film explores themes of poverty, land rights, and the impact of modernization on rural communities. The book analyzes how the film highlights the economic and political issues faced by the rural communities during that time.

"Bonani" (1992) is a film that explores the life of a young woman, Bonani, who is a tea garden worker in Assam. The film portrays the struggles of the tea garden workers and the oppressive conditions they face. The author examines how the film exposes the exploitation and economic deprivation faced by the tea garden workers and how it portrays the struggle for workers' rights.

The research made way for an abundance of data that has been divided into three volumes. This volume is the first of the trilogy.
