= 41st Locarno Film Festival =

Film festival in Locarno, Switzerland

- Location: Locarno, Switzerland
- Founded: 1946
- Awards: Golden Leopard: Distant Voices, Still Lives directed by Terence Davies; Schmetterlinge directed by Wolfgang Becker
- Artistic director: David Strieff
- No. of films: Over 150 programmed In Competition: 18
- Festival date: Opening: 4 August 1988; Closing: 14 August 1988
- Website: LFF

Locarno Film Festival
- 42nd 40th

The 41st Locarno Film Festival was held from 4 to 14 August 1988 in Locarno, Switzerland. Over 150 films were shown at the festival, with 18 in competition, 18 out-of-competition, and the rest were split between various sections, including a retrospective of Alberto Cavalcanti and a national section dedicated to British cinema.

The opening film was also a British film A World Apart directed by Chris Menges. However, the British Embassy refused to hold its reception on the same day as they did not want to be connected to a film that dealt with anti-apartheid activism. Festival director David Strieff described the position of the British Embassy as "outrageous".

The television movie section was merged with the main program as David Strieff said the distinction between TV and theatrical movie was no longer relevant for the festival. The Piazza Grande, the open-air theater, was only rained on for one night, but it forced director Nikos Panayotopoulos's highly anticipated film, The Woman Who Dreamed (I Yineka Pou Evlepe Ta Onira), to an indoor screening.

The festival closing ceremony was briefly interrupted by Swiss anti-apartheid activists protesting Swiss Bank Union (UBS), a festival sponsor, for doing business with apartheid South Africa.

The Golden Leopard, the festival's top prize, was awarded to two film this year: Schmetterlinge directed by Wolfgang Becker, and Distant Voices, Still Lives directed by Terence Davies.

== Juries ==
=== International Jury – Main Competition ===
- Gian Luigi Rondi, Jury chair, Italian screenwriter and former Venice Festival Festival Head
- Jose Alvaro Morais, Portuguese director
- Jean Rouch, French director and anthropologist
- Luc Bondy, Swiss film and theater director
- Maria Rita Galvao, Sao Palo Cinematique director
- Milva, Italian actress
- Thomas Hurlimann, Swiss writer
- Dimitri, Italian Mime
- Federico Jolli, last minute juror, film journalist and member of Locarno commission

== Official Sections 1988 ==
The following films were screened in these sections:

=== International Competition ===
Feature Films

Original Title	English Title	Director(s)	Year	Production Country
36 Fillette	Junior Size 36	Catherine Breillat	1988	France
Distant Voices, Still Lives		Terence Davies	1988	Great Britain
Domani Accadrà	It's Happening Tomorrow	Daniele Luchetti	1988	Italia
Dzusovy Roman	A Juicy Novel	Fero Fenic	1984	Czech Republic
Eden Miseria		Christine Laurent	1988	France
Filou		Takehiro Nakajima	1988	Switzerland
Gost	Visitor	Alexandre Kaïdanovski	1988	Russia
Haitian Corner		Raoul Peck	1987	Germany, France
Halodhia Choraye Baodhan Khai	The Catastrophe	Jahnu Barua	1987	India
Hotreal		Ildiko Szabo	1988	Hungary
Kyôshû	Memory	Takehiro Nakajima	1987	Japan
Macao Oder Die Rücksteite Des Meeres	Macao or the Back of the Sea	Clemens Klopfenstein	1988	Switzerland
Nakhoda Khorshid	Captain Khorshid	Nasser Taghvai	1987	Iran
Sama	The Trace	Néjia Ben Mabrouk	1982	Tunisia, Belgium
Schlaflose Nächte	Sleepless Nights	Marcel Gisler	1988	Switzerland, Germany
Schmetterlinge	Butterflies	Wolfgang Becker	1986	Germany
Stesso Sangue	Same Blood	Sandro Cecca, Egidio Eronico	1988	Italia
Family Viewing		Atom Egoyan	1987	Canada

=== Out of Competition (Fuori Concorso) ===
Out of Competition

Original Title	English Title	Director(s)	Year	Production Country
A Winter Tan		Jackie Burroughs, Louise Clark	1987	Canada
A World Apart		Chris Menges	1988	Great Britain
Dear America: Letters Home From Vietnam		Bill Couturié	1987	USA
Doc's Kingdom		Robert Kramer	1987	France
Hai Zi Wang	H AI Zi Wang	Chen Kaige	1987	China
Hong Gaoliang	Hong GA o Beautiful	Zhang Yimou	1987	China
Hotel Terminus - The Life And Times Of Klaus Barbie		Marcel Ophuls	1988	USA
I Yineka Pou Evlepe Ta Onira	The Woman Who Dreamed	Nikos Panayotopoulos	1988	Greece
Komissar	Commissar	Aleksandr Askoldov	1967	Russia
Krotki Film O Zabijaniu	A Short Film About Killing	Krzysztof Kieślowski	1987	Poland
Les Noces Barbares	Barbaric Wedding	Marion Hänsel	1987	France, Belgium
Pelle Erobreren	Pelle the Conqueror	Bille August	1987	Denmark
Phera		Buddhadeb Dasgupta	1986	India
Salaam Bombay!		Mira Nair	1988	India, France
Sur	On	Fernando Solanas	1988	Argentina
Una Donna Spezzata	A Broken Woman	Marco Leto	1988	Italia

=== Special Program ===
Special Program
Original Title	English Title	Director(s)	Year	Production Country
Amore A Cinque Stelle	Five Star Love	Roberto Giannarelli	1988	Italia
Cuore Di Ladro	Thief's Heart	Fabrizio Giordani	1988	Italia
De Bruit Et De Fureur	Of Noise and Fury	Jean-Claude Brisseau	1986	Switzerland
Der Schuh Des Patriarchen	The Patriarch's Shoe	Bruno Moll	1988	Switzerland
Der Wilde Mann	The Wild Man	Matt Zschokke	1988	Switzerland
Fernanda		Ricky Tognazzi	1988	Italia
Il Mitico Gianluca	The Legendary Gianluca	Francesco Lazotti	1988	Italia
Imago Meret Oppenheim		Pamela Robertson Pearce, Anselm Spoerri	1988	Switzerland
La Vacanza	The Holiday	Roger Guillot	1988	Italia
Le Retour De L'Enfant Pauvre	The Return of the Poor Child	Martin Pierlot	1987	France
Liebeserklärung	Declaration of Love	Ursula Bischof Scherer, Georg Janett	1988	Switzerland
O Samba	The Samba	Daniele Costantini	1988	Italia
Pour Ecrire Un Mot	To Write a Word	Walter Marti, Reni Mertens	1988	Switzerland
Reisen Ins Landesinnere	Travel Inland	Matthias von Gunten	1988	Switzerland
Till		Felix Tissi	1988	Switzerland, Germany

=== Tribute To – Five Ticino Film Stars ===
Tribute To Five Ticino Stars
Original Title	English Title	Director(s)	Year	Production Country
Die Ehe Der Maria Braun	The Marriage of Maria Braun	Rainer Werner Fassbinder	1978	Germany
La Merveilleuse Vie De Jeanne D'Arc	The Wonderful Life of Joan of Arc	Marco de Gastyne	1928	France
The Good Earth		Sidney Franklin	1937	USA
The Women		George Cukor	1939	USA
Voruntersuchung	Preliminary Examination	Robert Siodmark	1931	Germany

=== Retrospective – Alberto Cavalcanti ===
Retrospective Alberto Cavalcanti
Original Title	English Title	Director(s)	Year	Production Country
Alice In Switzerland		Georges Alexath, Alberto Cavalcanti	1942	Great Britain
Au Pays Du Scalp	In the Country of Scalp	Marquis de Wavrin	1932	Belgium
Champagne Charlie		Alberto Cavalcanti	1944	Great Britain
Coalface		Alberto Cavalcanti	1936	Great Britain
Coralie Et Cie		Alberto Cavalcanti	1933	France
Dead Of Night		Alberto Cavalcanti, Charles Crichton, Basil Dearden, Robert Hamer	1945	Great Britain
Die Windrose	That Windrosis	Joris Ivens	1956	Germany
En Rade	A Rade	Alberto Cavalcanti	1927	France
Film And Reality		Alberto Cavalcanti	1942	Great Britain
For Them That Trespass		Alberto Cavalcanti	1949	Great Britain
Herr Puntila Und Sein Knecht Matti	Mr. Puntila and His Servant Matti	Alberto Cavalcanti	1955	Austria
La Galerie Des Monstres	The Monster Gallery	Jaque Catelain	1924	France
La Prima Notte	The First Night	Alberto Cavalcanti	1958	India, France
Le Truc Du Bresilien	The Brazilian Thing	Alberto Cavalcanti	1932	France
Line To Tcherva Hut		Alberto Cavalcanti	1936	Great Britain
Men Of The Alps		Alberto Cavalcanti	1939	Great Britain
Message From Geneva		Alberto Cavalcanti	1937	Great Britain
Midsummer Day'S Work		Alberto Cavalcanti	1939	Great Britain
Mulher De Verdade	Real Woman	Alberto Cavalcanti	1954	Brazil
New Rates		Alberto Cavalcanti	1934	Great Britain
Night Mail		Harry Watt, Basil Wright	1936	Great Britain
North Sea		Harry Watt	1938	Great Britain
O Canto Do Mar	The Canto of the Sea	Alberto Cavalcanti	1954	Brazil
Pett And Pott		Alberto Cavalcanti	1934	Great Britain
Plaisir Defendus	Disable Pleasure	Alberto Cavalcanti	1933	France
Rien Que Les Heures	Just Hours	Alberto Cavalcanti	1926	France
Simao, O Caolho	Simao,	Alberto Cavalcanti	1952	Brazil
The Life And Adventures Of Nicholas Nickleby		Alberto Cavalcanti	1947	Great Britain
The Little People		Georg Pearson	1926	Great Britain
They Made Me A Fugitive		Alberto Cavalcanti	1947	Great Britain
Tour De Chant	Singing Tower	Alberto Cavalcanti	1933	France
Trois Chants Pour La France	Three Songs for France	Alberto Cavalcanti	1942	Great Britain
Um Homem E O Cinema	A Man and Cinema	Alberto Cavalcanti	1976	Brazil
We Live In Two Worlds		Alberto Cavalcanti	1937	Great Britain
Went The Day Well?		Alberto Cavalcanti	1942	Great Britain
Yellow Caesar		Alberto Cavalcanti	1941	Great Britain
Yvette		Alberto Cavalcanti	1927	France

=== British National Cinema Week ===
British Week / Feature Films
Original Title	English Title	Director(s)	Year	Production Country
Business As Usual		Lezli-Ann Barrette	1987	Great Britain
Dreaming Rivers		Martina Attile	1988	Great Britain
Drowning By Numbers		Peter Greendway	1988	Great Britain
Fire Raiser		Su Braden, Trudi Davies	1988	Great Britain
Framed Youth		Lesbian and Gay Youth Video Project	1983	Great Britain
Friendship'S Death		Peter Wollen	1987	Great Britain
Further And Particular		Stephen Dwoskin	1987	Great Britain
Girl Zone		Carola Klein	1986	Great Britain
Handsworth Song		John Akomfrah	1986	Great Britain
Out Of Order		Jonnie Turpie	1988	Great Britain
Rocinante		Ann Gudes, Eduardo Guedes	1986	Great Britain
Soursweet		Mike Newell	1988	Great Britain
Stormy Monday		Mike Figgis	1988	Great Britain
T. Dan Smith		Amber Film	1988	Great Britain
The Last Of England		Derek Jarman	1987	Great Britain
The Raggedy Rawney		Bob Hoskins	1988	Great Britain
This Is Not An Aids Ad		Isaac Julien	1987	Great Britain
Tumbledown		Richard Eyre	1987	Great Britain
When The Dog Bites		Penny Woolcock	1988	Great Britain
Short Films
Behind Closed Doors		Anna Thew	1987	Great Britain
Deep Red Instant Love		Rik Lander	1988	Great Britain
Lo Pay No Way		Vulture Video	1984	Great Britain
Taxi Driver Ii		George Barber	1986	Great Britain
The Hidden Wisdom		Patricia Diaz, Michelle McIntosh	1987	Great Britain
Uranium Hex		Sandra Lahire	1987	Great Britain
Water Works		Tony Hill	1987	Great Britain

=== Carte Blanche to Ettore Scola ===
Original Title	English Title	Director(s)	Year	Production Country
La Prise Du Pouvoir Par Louis Xiv	The Taking of Power by Louis XIV	Roberto Rossellini	1966	France
Miracolo A Milano	Miracle in Milan	Vittorio De Sica	1950	Italia
8½		Federico Fellini	1962	Italia
The Kid		Charlie Chaplin	1921	USA
The Treasure Of The Sierra Madre		John Huston	1948	USA
Totò A Colori	Totò in Color	Steno Stefano Vanzina	1952	Italia

=== Out of Program ===
Original Title	English Title	Director(s)	Production Country
Double Bande	Double Band	Christiane Kolla	Switzerland

== Independent Sections ==
=== Swiss Information (Information Suisse) ===
Swiss Ticino - Short Films
Original Title	English Title	Director(s)	Year	Production Country
La Toilette De Venus	Venus Toilet	Adriano Kestenholz	1988	Switzerland
Ladro Di Voci	Voices Thief	Andrea Canetta	1987	Switzerland
Mah & Donna		Linda Della Casa	1987	Switzerland
Sax		Daniel de Ritis	1988	Switzerland
Un Uomo In Un Fosso	A Man in a Ditch	Dolores Camenisch	1988	Switzerland
Verdemare	Unemployed	Antonio Mariotti	1988	Switzerland
Swiss - Feature films
Andreas		Patrick Lindenmaier	1988	Switzerland
Arnold Böcklin 1827-1901		Bernhard Raith	1981	Switzerland
Aus Allem Raus Und Mitten Drin	Out of Everything Out and in the Middle of it	Pius Morger	1988	Switzerland
Courir Les Rues	Run the Streets	Dominique Comtat Comtat	1988	Switzerland
Deshima	DES Hi	Beat Kuert	1987	Switzerland
Erzählung Für Sandra	Narrative for Sandra		1988	Switzerland
Gemini, The Twin Stars		Jacques Sandoz	1988	Switzerland
Happy End		Marcel Schüpbach	1987	Switzerland
Kampf Ums Glück	Fight for Luck	Bernhard Giger	1987	Switzerland
La Dame De Paris	The Lady of Paris	Anne Theurillat	1987	Switzerland
La Loi Sauvage	Wild Law	Francis Reusser	1987	Switzerland
La Meridienne	The Meridienne	Jean-François Amiguet	1988	Switzerland
La Vallee Fantôme	The Ghost Vallee	Alain Tanner	1987	Switzerland
Mario Botta Senza Luce Nessuno Spazio	Mario Botta without Light No Space	Andres Pfäffli	1988	Switzerland
Schlachtzeichen	Slaughterhouse	Thomas Imbach	1987	Switzerland
Si Le Soleil Ne Revenait Pas	If the Sun Was not Coming Back	Claude Goretta	1987	Switzerland
Umbruch	Upheaval	Hans-Ulrich Schlumpf	1987	Switzerland
Zimmer 36		Markus Fischer	1988	Switzerland
Swiss - Animated Films
Douce Nuit	Sweet Night	Martial Wannaz	1987	Switzerland
Ds Nüüni Tram		Marc Sanz	1986	Switzerland
Exercice D'Attente	Waiting Exercise	Marc Sanz	1988	Switzerland
Herzens-Freude	Heart Joy	Anka Schmid	1987	Switzerland
Hungry		Claudius Gentinetta	1988	Switzerland
Le Gastronaute	The Gart Zorgia	Derek White, Dutch With	1988	Switzerland
Question D'Optiques	Optics	Claude Luyet	1986	Switzerland
Reflex		Alexis Berset	1987	Switzerland

== Official Awards ==
=== Official Jury of the International Competition ===
- Golden Leopard, tied: Distant Voices, Still Lives directed by Terence Davies, and Schmetterlinge directed by Wolfgang Becker
- Silver Leopard: Halodhia Choraye Baodhan Khai (The Catastrophe) directed by Jahnu Barua
- Bronze Leopard: Captain Khorshid directed by Nasser Taghvai, Schlaflose Nächte directed by Marcel Gisler,
- Bronze Leopard (Best Actor): for Best Acting Indra Bania in Halodhia Choraye Baodhan Khai (The Catastrophe)
- Special Mention, Official Jury: Family Viewing directed by Atom Egoyan, KYÔSHÛ directed by Takehiro Nakajima

=== Youth Jury ===
- Honorable Mention Youth Jury: Haitian Corner by Raoul Peck, Distant Voices, Still Lives directed by Terence Davies,
- First Prize: Family Viewing directed by Atom Egoyan
- Second Prize: Schmetterlinge directed by Wolfgang Becker
- Third Prize: Eden Miseria directed by Christine Laurent

=== Ecumenical Jury ===
- Oecumenic Jury Award: Family Viewing directed by Atom Egoyan
- Oecumenical Jury Mention: Halodhia Choraye Baodhan Khai directed by Jahnu Barua

=== Cicae Jury ===
- Cicae Award: Distant Voices, Still Lives directed by Terence Davies

=== FIPRESCI Jury ===
- International Critic Award: Family Viewing directed by Atom Egoyan
- Honorable Mention FIPRESCI: Schmetterlinge directed by Wolfgang Becker
