= Sattyakee D'com Bhuyan =

Indian actor, director, and writer (born 1973)

Sattyakee D'com Bhuyan সাত্যকী ডি'কম ভূঞা
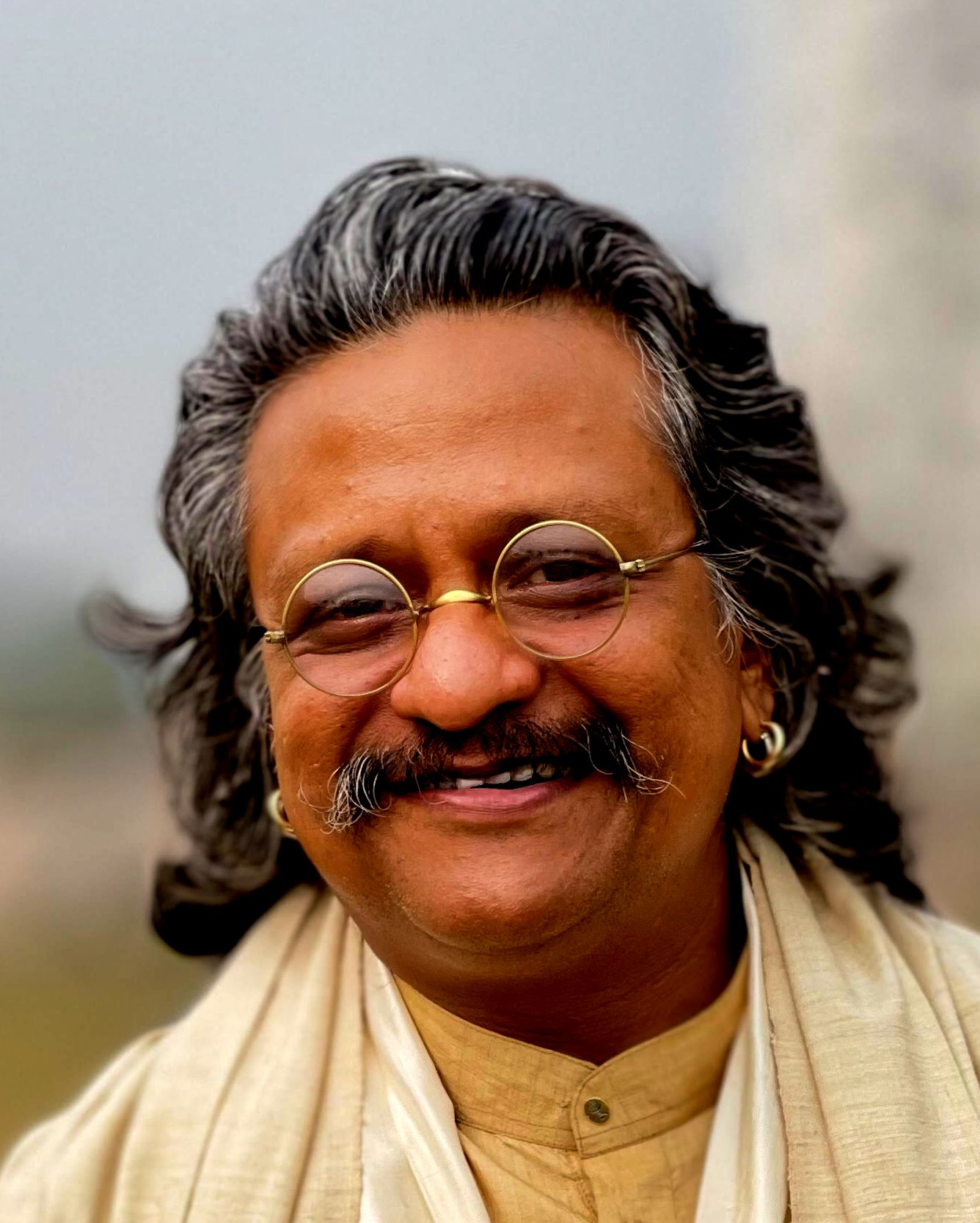
- Bhuyan in 2023
- Born: 15 March 1973 (age 53); Guwahati, Assam, India
- Occupations: Actor; director
- Parent: Dhiru Bhuyan (father)

Sattyakee D'com Bhuyan is an Indian actor, director, playwright, and writer from Guwahati, Assam.

== Early life and education ==
Sattyakee D'com Bhuyan was born in 1973 in Guwahati, Assam, India. He is the son of Dhiru Bhuyan, a celebrated actor and filmmaker. He completed his schooling at Faculty Higher Secondary School, Amingaon and went on to receive his bachelor degree in English from Cotton College in 1994. In 2000, he completed his masters in sociolinguistics at Gauhati University while working at The Telegraph as a correspondent.

He developed an interest in theatre from an early age, influenced as he was by his father's career and the environment this placed him in.

== Career ==
=== Theatre and direction ===
By the early 1990s, Bhuyan was active in English-language theatre in Guwahati. A 2010 profile in India Today reported that at the age of 23, he staged a production of Tennessee Williams's A Streetcar Named Desire.

Bhuyan went on to found D'Passion Collective, a Guwahati-based theatre and storytelling group. A project description on UNESCO's International Year of Indigenous Languages 2019 platform identifies him as organiser of the "Indigenous Storytelling in Assamese (Axomiya) and Nagamese through Bamhum and Howey Music" initiative. The project was planned as a series of performances in Kohima, Dimapur, and Guwahati, with Bhuyan directing a musical storytelling work focusing on Nagamese and Assamese oral traditions.

=== Writing ===
Since 1991, Bhuyan has been a columnist, writing articles and features for various regional and national newspapers and magazines across India. His contributions in the fields of music and culture have been featured in such publications as The Wire, The Sentinel, and The Assam Tribune.

From 2005 to 2014, he worked as a communications associate for the International Finance Corporation, based in Kolkata and Dhaka, Bangladesh.

In 2025, he wrote a long-form piece for India Today NE, reflecting on the long career of musician Lou Majaw.

=== Teaching and mentorship ===
Bhuyan has held academic and faculty roles at the Assam Royal Global University (RGU) in Guwahati. In an October 2025 report on TEDxRoyalGlobalUniversity, RGU described him as deputy dean of the Department of Student Welfare and as the lead licensee and curator of TEDxRoyalGlobalUniversity.

He is also associated with the Dr Bhupen Hazarika Centre for Creativity at RGU, participating in its literary and cultural programmes. A July 2025 report on a commemoration of poet Hiren Bhattacharyya listed him as deputy dean of Students' Welfare.

In November 2025, RGU launched the commemorative book Zubeen: Twenty Songs and Seven Portraits, edited and compiled by Bhuyan and published by the Dr Bhupen Hazarika Centre for Creativity, during a programme marking the birth anniversary of singer Zubeen Garg.

=== Acting and directing ===
Bhuyan has appeared in a small number of feature films from Assam and the wider northeast. In the 2017 action film Mission China, he played a sniper. In Bhaskar Hazarika's 2019 film Aamis, he is credited as playing an opera singer. In Rajni Basumatary's 2019 Bodo-language drama film Jwlwi: The Seed, Bhuyan appears in a supporting role as a commanding officer.

Bhuyan directed the 2023 documentary film The Platinum Gong, celebrating the life of Lou Majaw.

== Selected plays ==
- A Streetcar Named Desire: Tennessee Williams
- Where There's a Will: Mahesh Dattani
- Ahh!!! Women: Miro Gavran
- 30 Days in September: Mahesh Dattani
- Clowning Glory – A Day in the Life of an Actor: Sattyakee D'com Bhuyan
- Ami Asu

== Awards ==
- India Today Youth Icon (2010)
