= Chetana Das =

Indian actress

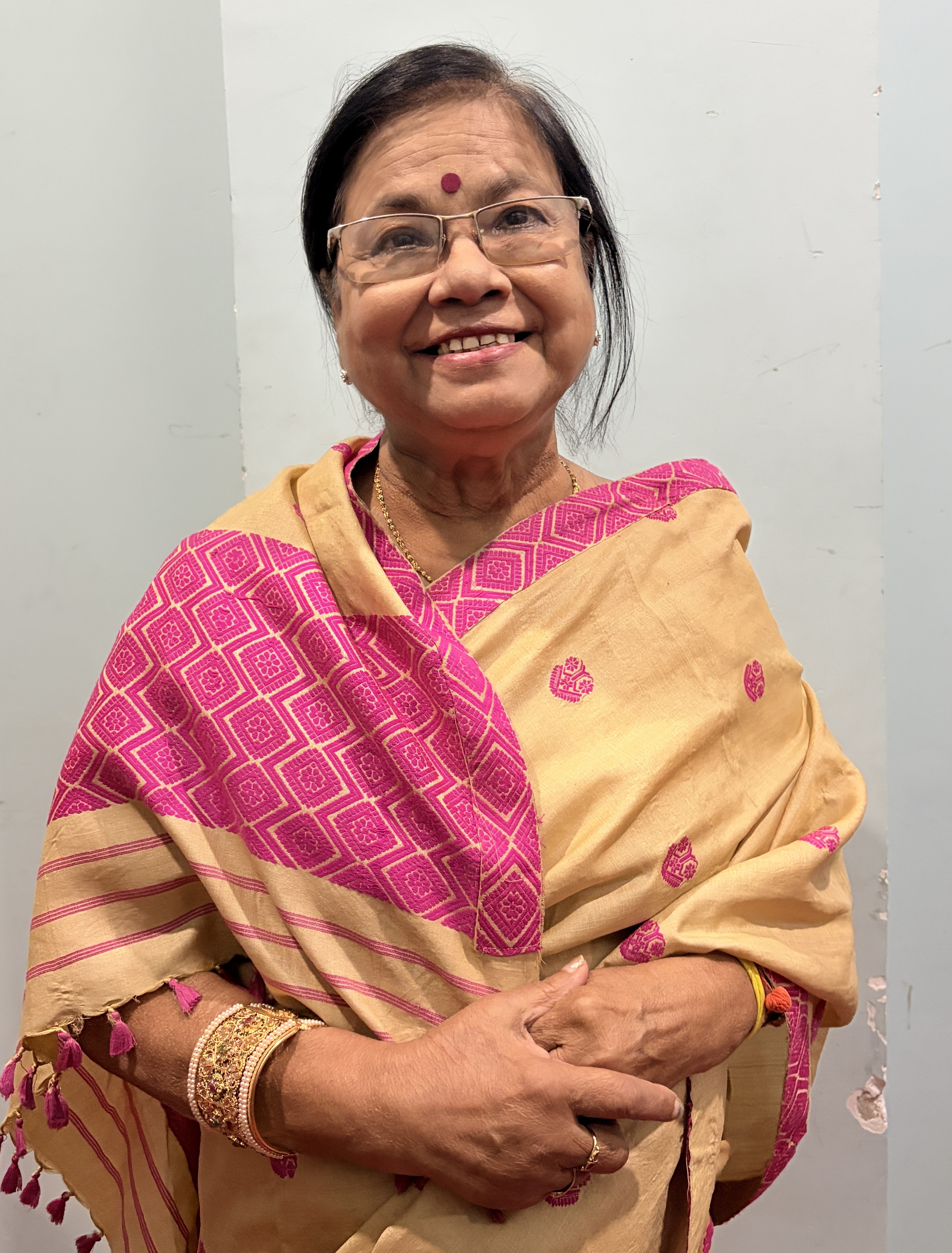
- Born: Shillong, Meghalaya (then Assam), India
- Education: Darrang College, Tezpur
- Occupation: Actress
- Title: The Comedy Queen of Assam
- Spouse: Bimaladanda Das

Chetana Das (born in Shillong, Meghalaya, India) is an Indian actress from Assam. She is popular face in Assamese cinema for her comic roles. She is the comedy queen of Assamese film industry.

== Early life ==
Chetana Das was born in Shillong. She completed her graduation from Darrang College, Tezpur in Assam. Her first drama was Jyoti Prasad Agarwala's Sunit Konwori, and also got the award of best actress in that drama from Tezpur Multipurpose Girls School.

Her husband, Bimaladanda Das, died in 2020, during the COVID-19 pandemic.

== Selected filmography ==
Year	Title	AKA
1973	Titash Ekti Nadir Naam	A River Named Titash
1973	Banoria Phul	Forest Flower
1973	Abhijaan	The Mission
1976	Shurjo Grahan	
1978	Kallol	The Wave
1980	Indira	
1980	Ajali Nabou	Innocent Sister-in-Law
1984	Manik Raitong	Manik the Miserable
1984	Kokadeuta Nati Aru Hati	Grandfather, Grandson and Elephant
1985	Agnisnaan	Ordeal/ Bath in Fire
1986	Papori	
1988	Kolahal	The Turmoil
1992	Firingoti	The Spark
1994	Meemanxa	The Verdict
1995	I Killed Him, Sir	
1996	Adajya	The Inflammable
1998	Dil Se..	From Heart
2000	Hiya Diya Niya	
2001	Daag	The Spot
2002	Kanyadaan	
2002	Jonaki Mon	
2004	Kadambari	
2004	Rongmon	
2005	Suren Suror Putek	
2016	Doordarshan Eti Jantra	Television a Machine
2017	Ishu	
2019	Ratnakar	
2022	Bandita Bora	
