= Rana Kharkongor =

Indian Khasi singer (died 2021)

- Born: 1951 or 1952
- Origin: Shillong
- Died: 21 May 2021 (aged 69) NEIGRIHMS, Shillong
- Genres: Folk music
- Occupation: Singer

Rana Kharkongor (1951/1952 – 21 May 2021) was a Khasi-Indian singer, songwriter and video director. He was well known for his release "Tiew Kulab" and was a part of the album Jingkieng Ksiar.

== Biography ==
Kharkongor started singing in the 1970s and throughout his career received 'Grade A' by All India Radio, and was featured on National DD Metro POP TIME Programme in the year 1986. He has produced twenty-seven albums which were mostly recorded in Calcutta and has 29 albums to his credit.

In October 2013, Kharkongor was involved in the protest against bandhs by giving a performance alongside artist such as Lou Majaw. A few years later he performed on 2 April 2016 at the Monolith Festival.

Kharkongor was a victim of COVID-19. He died at the age of 69 on Friday morning 21 May 2021.

== Discography ==
- Jingkieng Ksiar volume 1, 2 and 3 (1983)
- Best of Jingkieng Ksiar (1984)
- Balei ia nga (1985)
- Lashai dei ka Mynta (1986)
- Special Collection (1986)
- The Pioneer (1987)
- Nga ju kynmaw (1990)
- Top Hits of Jingkieng Ksiar (1991)
- Ngam long marwei (1993)
- Ngan jam shakhmat (1995)
- Star of 22 Hits (1995)
- 24 Non Stop (1995)
- LTC Hikai ia u A (1996)
- Junom (1996)
- LTC Nongpyniap (1997)
- Ummat u Tirot Sing (1997)
- Golden Sentimental Tang Sur Jingrwai (2003)
- Rock Collection (2004)
- Rangli (2005)
- Adona (2004)
