= Rongatapu 1982 =

2023 Indian film by Adityam Saikia

- Directed by: Adityam Saikia
- Written by: Adityam Saikia
- Produced by: Arun Kumar Rai; Ajay Kumar Rai
- Starring: Aimee Baruah; Gunjan Bhardwaj; Rimpi Das
- Cinematography: Krishna Shah
- Edited by: Rantu Chetia
- Music by: Amrit Pritam; Sukumar
- Production company: BRC Cine Production
- Release date: 24 November 2023
- Country: India
- Language: Assamese

Rongatapu 1982 is a 2023 Indian Assamese-language historical drama film written and directed by Adityam Saikia in his directorial debut. Set in rural Assam during the early 1980s, the film depicts local socio-political conditions through a fictional narrative. It was recognized at the 71st National Film Awards, winning the Best Assamese Feature Film.

== Plot ==
The film is set in 1982 in the riverine (char) areas of Assam, a period marked by land disputes and communal tension. The narrative follows the residents of a small settlement as they face the threat of displacement and violence.

Morom, a pregnant housewife, deals with the trauma of a brutal incident involving a family member. Her husband, Jadab, is an orphan raised by the village who works to provide for his family. Although Jadab initially attempts to remain neutral to protect his pregnant wife, the escalating regional conflict eventually forces him to take a stand when the violence reaches his community.

The story also depicts the lives of sisters Rupali and Mala . Mala suffers from severe psychological trauma and night terrors, requiring Rupali to provide constant care. Their struggle for a peaceful life is complicated by Rupali's relationship with Madhab, an educated youth from a prominent family, as the social unrest disrupts their future plans.

Another central figure, Rafiza, represents the plight of women affected by systemic violence. Having survived an assault, she navigates a society where she fears for the future of her unborn child. The film culminates during a night of significant unrest that determines the fate of the characters and their village.

== Cast ==
- Aimee Baruah as Morom, a pregnant housewife who faces personal loss and danger as the village social fabric unravels.
- Gunjan Bhardwaj as Jadab, Morom's husband, who is reluctantly drawn into the escalating regional conflict.
- Rimpi Das as Rafiza, a woman caught in desperate circumstances, portraying the harrowing impact of societal violence on the vulnerable.
- Kalpana Kalita as Rupali, a hardworking sister who protects and cares for Mala.
- Alishmita Goswami as Mala, Rupali's sister, a character who remains silent throughout the film, communicating the trauma of past horrors through gestures.
- Vivek Bora (also credited as Bibek Bora) as Madhab, an educated son of a respected village family and Rupali’s love interest.
- Debananda Saikia

== Production ==
The project was conceived as a period drama focusing on the early 1980s in Assam. The creators aimed to document social realities of the era rather than present a commercial narrative structure. Research included local oral histories, contemporary accounts, and recreations of period-specific settings. Principal photography took place on location in Assam. The production relied on natural lighting and practical locations, such as village homes and agricultural fields, to establish the setting.

== Release and reception ==
The film was released on 24 November 2023. A critic noted the production design and its observational narrative style. The direction was described as restrained, with commentators characterizing the pacing as reflective.

== Awards and nominations ==
Year	Award	Category	Recipient(s)	Result	Ref.
2025	National Film Awards	Best Assamese Feature Film	Adityam Saikia, Arun Kumar Rai and Ajay Kumar Rai	Won	
2024	Filmfare Awards Assamese	Best Actress	Aimee Baruah	Won	
