= Kashmiri Saikia Baruah =

Indian film and stage actress

- Born: Mangaldoi, Assam, India
- Occupations: Actress; Singer; Newscaster; Doordarshan; Anchor
- Years active: 1971–present

Kashmiri Saikia Baruah is an Indian film and stage actress and singers who works in Assamese cinema. She was born in Mangaldoi, Assam. She has played stellar roles in award-winning Assamese films such as Putola Ghar, Sandhya Raag, Agnisnaan and Hkhagoroloi Bohu Door.

== Education and career ==
She started her schooling in her home-town Mangaldoi and later finished her graduation from Cotton College, Guwahati in 1981. Her first appearance in Assamese cinema was seen as a casual artist in a group of dancers in a popular, song Aei Purnimar Raati in an award-winning Assamese film Aranya, in 1971. She was still a school girl when she made her debut as a lead actress in the film directed by Samarendra Narayan Dev titled Putola Ghar, released in 1976.

A year later, in 1977, the film Sandhya Raag directed by Bhabendra Nath Saikia, where she was an actress, became the first Assamese movie to be screened in Indian Panorama.

Her career in Assamese film Industry was at its peak during the 1980s with the release of a volley of her acted films that includes Agnisnaan (1985), Mayuri (1986), Anthony Mur Naam (1986), Aei Desh Mur Desh (1986), and, later in 1995, Hkhagoroloi Bohu Door, among many others.

She also had an association with Doordarshan and appeared as a newscaster in Assamese bulletins during the 1990s.

Presently, she is frequently seen on television as an anchor/participant in Assamese talk shows and programs.

== Filmography ==
- Aranya
- Putala Ghar (1976)
- Sandhya Raag (1977)
- Agnisnaan (1985)
- Mayuri (1986)
- Anthony Mur Naam (1986)
- Aei Desh Mur Desh (1986)
- Hkhagoroloi Bohu Door (1995)
- Chenai Mur Dhulia
