= Konikar Ramdhenu =

Konikar Ramdhenu (Ride on the Rainbow)
- Film poster
- Directed by: Jahnu Barua
- Written by: Jahnu Barua
- Produced by: Sailadhar Baruah
- Starring: Bishnu Kharghoria; Moloya Goswami; Reba Phukan; Dinesh Das; Ronik; Abinash Sharma; Ashwini Bhuyan; Indrani Gogoi; Mahika Sharma
- Cinematography: P. Rajan
- Edited by: Heu-En Baruah
- Music by: Reeta Das Baruah; Y. S. Moolky
- Distributed by: Dolphin Films Pvt. Ltd
- Release date: 20 December 2002
- Running time: 112 minutes
- Country: India
- Language: Assamese

Konikar Ramdhenu is a 2002 Indian Assamese language film directed by Jahnu Barua. It was released on 20 December 2002. The film was shown in Indian Panorama section of IFFI during October 2002 in Delhi and Mumbai International Festival in 2003. It is the last instalment of his trilogy, the other two being Xagoroloi Bohu Door (1995) and Pokhi (1998). Konikar Ramdhenu depicts the horrors that happen in a juvenile home.

== Plot ==
The story revolves around an imaginative and intelligent 11-year-old boy Kukoi (played by Ronik) who runs away from his village home and starts working in a motor garage in a city. One day the owner attempts to molest Kukoi. In self-defence, Kokoi hits the owner with an iron rod killing him on the spot. Kukoi is produced before court and then sent to state juvenile home where he is traumatized. Biswa Boro, the warden of the home, is an understanding man. He coaxes the boy into a confession of the true circumstances of the painful event. Kukoi is brought before the magistrate who orders his release and custody to his parents or any authorised guardian. Biswa goes to Kukoi's village where he discovers that the boy's mother died years ago and his stepfather has disowned him. Biswa, who is now retired and does not have children, decides to adopt Kukoi.

== Research ==
Director Jahnu Barua visited 12 juvenile homes before making the film. He observed that out of 100 cases, more than 80 end up in "negative situations", much below expectations.

== Awards ==
- National award - Best Regional Film (2002)
