= Juiphool =

- Directed by: Jadumoni Dutta
- Screenplay by: Nizara Rajkumari
- Produced by: Jadumoni Dutta; Rita Dutta; Nandini Sharma Dutta
- Starring: Shibrani Kalita; Tridip Gogoi; Rituparna Phukan
- Cinematography: Jiten Boro
- Edited by: Sibajit Sharma
- Release date: November 2024 (IFFI Goa)
- Running time: 109 minutes
- Country: India
- Language: Assamese

Juiphool (Orange and Purple) is a 2024 Indian Assamese-language film co-produced directed by Jadumoni Dutta. It stars Shibrani Kalita, Tridip Gogoi, Rituparna Phukan in key roles. The film won the National Film Award for Best Assamese Feature Film.

The film was first premiered at 55th International Film Festival of India.

== Plot ==
The film depicts lives of two women, Lakshmi and Rengma, in disturbed Assam-Nagaland border, with folk tales that creates disharmony between the two villages, despite attempts by pregnant Lakshmi (from Assamese village) and Rengma (from Nagaland village).

== Cast ==
- Shibrani Kalita
- Tridip Gogoi
- Rituparna Phukan

== Awards ==
Year	Award	Category	Result	Ref.
2026	72nd National Film Awards	Best Assamese Feature Film	Won	
