= Jatinga Ityadi =

- Poster of the film
- Directed by: Sanjib Sabhapandit
- Screenplay by: Sanjib Sabhapandit
- Story by: Sanjib Sabhapandit
- Produced by: Rajkamal Bhuyan
- Starring: Bishnu Khargharia; Bina Patangia; Saurabh Hazarika
- Cinematography: Parasher Barua
- Edited by: Manas Adhikari
- Music by: Dipak Sarma
- Production company: Ruchira Arts Private Ltd.
- Release date: 2007
- Running time: 124 minutes
- Country: India
- Language: Assamese

Jatinga Ityadi is an Assamese language film directed by Sanjib Sabhapandit. The film was screened in the International Film Festival of India (IFFI) 2007 in the Indian Panorama section. The film depicts the current scenario of militancy in Assam.

== Plot ==
A British couple visits Assam looking for the graveyard of the man's grandfather who was once a tea planter. With a view to drawing international attention, an underground rebel group kidnaps the couple. But being unable to communicate with the foreign couple, the outfit picks up an educated but frustrated youth who is fluent in English. Eager to be a part of that so-called "movement" of the group, the boy readily jumps in. But inside the hideout, Manab, the protagonist, discovers that the idea he had of the militant group and its "struggle for independence" was entirely wrong. He decides to help the British couple escape. In the process he is killed in a crossfire with all the militants present in the scene.

== Title of the film ==
Speaking about the significance of the film title, Sabhapadit informed that Jatinga is a small place in Assam where birds are said to commit suicide. But this is not the case - birds do not actually commit suicide, they are lured to death. At night, people hold bamboo torches to attract these birds and when they fly close, they are clubbed to death. Same way in the guise of a revolution the boys are lured into a death trap. Drawing a similarity between the birds and the youth, he chose that title for his movie.

== Cast ==
- Bishnu Khargharia as Ratnakanta
- Bina Patangia as Ratnakanta’s wife
- Saurabh Hazarika as Manab
- Mallika Sarma as Rita
- Anup Hazarika as Dhan
- Lakhi Borthakur as Rita’s father
- Tony Richmond as Mr. Tony
- James Parry as Jack
- Sarah Bugden as Pauline
- Kuntol Goswami as 47
- Garima Patowari as Paahi
- Baharul Islam as Padri
- Binoy Deka as Deka
- Amitabh Rajkhowa as Bubu
- Arun Hazarika as Shop Keeper

== See also ==
- Jollywood
