= Pokhi =

Pokhi (And The River Flows…)
- A screenshot
- Directed by: Jahnu Barua
- Written by: Jahnu Barua
- Produced by: Sailadhar Baruah
- Starring: Bishnu Kharghoria; Haramohan Das; Gargi; Bina Potongia; Rajib Kro; Gopal Kharghoria; Sanjoy Kharghoria; Reeta Das Baruah
- Cinematography: P. Rajan
- Edited by: Heu-En Baruah
- Music by: Y. S. Moolky
- Distributed by: Dolphin Films Pvt. Ltd
- Release date: 26 October 1998
- Country: India
- Language: Assamese

Pokhi is an Assamese language drama film directed by Jahnu Barua. It was released in 1998 as the second instalment of his trilogy – the other two being Xagoroloi Bohu Door (1995) and Konikar Ramdhenu (2003). Pokhi won a National Award for Best Feature Film in the Assamese Category in 2000.
