= Bhoga Khirikee =

- Directed by: Jahnu Barua
- Written by: Jahnu Barua
- Produced by: Priyanka Chopra; Madhu Chopra; Shahnaab Alam
- Starring: Zerifa Wahid; Seema Biswas; Bishnu Kharghoria
- Music by: Ibson Lal Baruah
- Distributed by: Purple Pebble Pictures
- Release date: 25 November 2018 (GIFF)
- Country: India
- Language: Assamese

Bhoga Khidikee is a 2018 Indian Assamese drama film directed by Jahnu Barua. It was the opening film of 2nd Guwahati International Film Festival. The film is based on the real life experiences of a village girl in upper Assam and is set against the socio-political landscape of the state in 2015.

== Plot ==
The film revolves around Togor, a young woman married secretly to a militant Konseng who breaks her window to enter her room at night without her parents being aware of it.

== Cast ==
- Zerifa Wahid
- Seema Biswas
- Bishnu Kharghoria
- Kasvi Sharma
