= Utpal Borpujari =

Indian film critic and film director

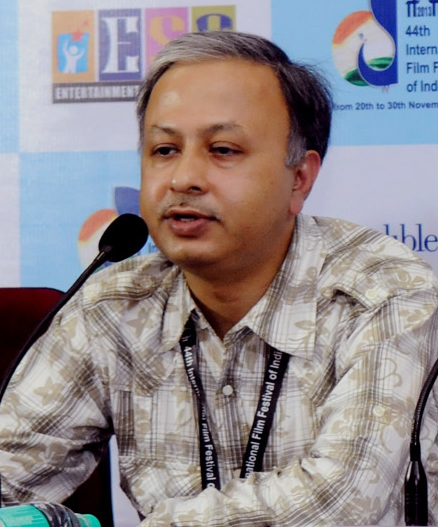
- Borpujari in 2013
- Born: May 21; Assam, India
- Occupations: Film critic, Film director
- Awards: National Film Awards; for Best Film Critic, and Best Director

Utpal Borpujari is an Indian double National Film Award winner; one, as a film critic, and the other, as a filmmaker. In 2003, he won the Swarna Kamal for Best Film Critic at the 50th National Film Awards of India. In 2018, he won the National Film Award, and 5 Assam State Film Awards for his debut feature film Ishu

He holds an M.Tech degree in Applied Geology from the Indian Institute of Technology (Roorkee). And is a member of the Film Critics Circle of India

== Filmography ==
=== Scriptwriting ===
- A Real Cultural Revolution (2011), produced by Films Division
- Documentary on Odia culture (2011), produced by the Govt. of Odisha
- Resurgent Manas (2006), produced by Ministry of External Affairs

=== Direction ===
- Mayong: Myth/Reality (2012)
- Songs of the Blue Hills (2013)
- Soccer Queens of Rani
- For a Durbar of the People
- Memories of a Forgotten War
- Ishu produced by the Children's Film Society, India (CFSI)

== Author ==
Utpal has written extensively on film, politics, society, literature, and culture for a variety of newspapers and magazines, such as First Post, DNA, the Deccan HeraldOutlook, the Economic Times, Dear Cinema, Eastern Chronicle, The Sentinel, Press Trust of India (PTI, New Delhi), India Times, The Hindustan Times, The Hindu, The Times of India, Assam Tribune, North East Times, Deep Focus Cinema, Seven Sisters Post, India Today, The Assam Tribune, The North East Times, Raijor Batori, and Prantik.

As a film critic/journalist, he has covered Cannes, Nantes, Montreal, IFFI, MAMI, the 3rd Eye Asian Film Fest, MIFF, and Osian's Cinefan Festival of Asian and Arab Cinema film festivals over the years. And edited the official catalogue of the International Film Festival of India (IFFI) in 2003, 2004, 2005, 2007 and 2008.

Additionally, he is the co-author of the book 'Secret Killings of Assam' and the editor/co-author of the book 'Assam.'

== Awards ==
- National Film Award - Best Film Critic
- Best Feature Film in Assamese at 65th National Film Awards: Ishu
- Sailadhar BaruahFilm Award : Ishu

== Other accolades /achievements /responsibilities ==
- Part of 177 worldwide film critics who were invited by BBC Culture to poll individual Top 10 films of the 21st Century (2016).
- Part of 209 worldwide film critics who were invited by BBC Culture to poll the Top 100 world cinema of all time (2018).
- Former Member, International Film Critics Federation (FIPRESCI) – has served on FIPRESCI juries at Montreal World Film Festival (2010), MAMI Mumbai Film Festival (2006), 11th Osian’s Cinefan Film Festival (NETPAC-FIPRESCI Jury, 2009), MIFF (organized by Films Division, 2012 and 2008).
- Panel of 10 critics 10 directors whose selection of 20 films each led to the Top 20 of Indian cinema ‘Master List’ for the ‘T20 of Indian Cinema’ event at 40th International Film Festival of India (IFFI), Goa, 2009 (www.t20ofindiancinema.com)
- Member, National Film Awards Jury, 51st National Film Awards, 2004.
- Member, selection jury for World Cinema, IFFI, 2018, 2017, 2016, 2015, 2012, 2010, 2009, 2008.
- Curator/Consultant: Focus Section on Northeast Cinemas, 44th International Film Festival of India, Goa (2013); “Fragrances from the North East” Film Festivals organised by the Directorate of Film Festivals, Govt of India, New Delhi (2014, 2015) and Pune (2017); “Tales of Women: North East Cinema”, 45th International Film Festival of India (IFFI), Goa (2014); “Camera Along the Brahmaputra” Film Festival, commemorating 80 years of Cinema in Assam, at India International Centre, New Delhi (2015); “Young Directors From Northeast India”, 46th International Film Festival of India (IFFI), Goa (2015); South Asian Film Festival, the Maldives (2007); 70 years of Assamese Cinema), 3rd Eye Asian Film Festival, Mumbai (2005); Guwahati International Film Festival (2005)
- Artistic Director, Guwahati CineASA International Film Festival since 2009.
- Director, Guwahati International Short Film Festival, 2011 & 2012.
- Creative Advisor, Brahmaputra Valley Film Festival, Guwahati, 2014.
- Jury to select scripts at the Indian Children’s Film Lab (International screen writing lab for Indian children’s cinema 2009), organized by Eleeanora Images (India) and Performing Arts Labs (PAL), UK
- Short Film Competition Jury at the 1st Pravasi Film Festival, New Delhi, 2010
- Jury member of WeCare Film Festival, New Delhi, 2011
- Jury - Drishti Creative Contest, 2012 (for films, posters and creative works on themes related to blindness)
- Member of Jury, 9th CMS Vatavaran Environment & Wildlife Film Festival, New Delhi, 2017.
- Member of Jury, the SunChild 7th International Environmental Festival, organized by the Foundation for the Preservation of Wildlife and Cultural Assets (FPWC), Armenia, 2017.
- Member of Jury, “Award Scheme for Short Films on Human Rights Issues”, National Human Rights Commission, New Delhi, 2017.
- Member of pre-selection Jury, National Science Film Festival, 2018.
- Member, Preview Committee, DD Urdu Channel, 2013.
- Member, Executive Committee, Dr Bhabendranath Saikia Institute of Mass Communication, Guwahati.
- Trustee, Film Trust India, New Delhi.
- Trustee, Le France, Guwahati
- Member, Advisory Panel (Assamese), National Book Trust, India (2014–17 )
- Member, Indian Panorama (Feature Films), 45th International Film Festival of India (IFFI), Goa, 2014.
- Member, Evaluation Committee, Short Film Contest of Union Ministry of Culture on MyGov platform to commemorate 150th birth anniversary of Mahatma Gandhi, 2018
- Member, Film Selection Committee, Centre for Cultural Resources & Training (CCRT), Ministry of Culture, Government of India.
- Jury - Siffcy
- Jury - MIFF
- Jury - Montreal World Film Festival
- Jury - MAMI
- Selection of films for National Film Awards
