= Bishnu Kharghoria =

Indian actor

- Born: 1946 (age 79–80); Dibrugarh, Assam
- Occupation: Actor
- Years active: 1974–present

Bishnu Kharghoria is an Indian actor from Assam. He has acted in many Assamese movies and dramas.

== Filmography ==
- Bristi (1974)
- Sandhya Raag (1977)
- Kallol (1978)
- Kolahal (1989)
- Bonani (1990)
- Firingoti (1992)
- Rickshawala (1993)
- Xagoroloi Bohudoor (1995)
- Adajya (1996)
- Pokhi (1998)
- Daman: A Victim of Marital Violence (2001)
- Daag (2001)
- Nayak (2001)
- Sesh Upahar (2001)
- Konikar Ramdhenu (2003)
- Bidhata (2003)
- Antaheen Jatra (2004)
- Barood (2004)
- Jatinga Ityadi (2007)
- Aai Kot Nai (2008)
- Ajan Faquir Saheb (2008)
- Basundhara (2010)
- Raamdhenu (2011)
- Jetuka Pator Dore (2011)
- Baandhon (2012)
- Karma Ke Rati (2013)
- Ajeyo (2014)
- Paani (2014)
- Aisa Yeh Jahaan (2015)
- Bahniman (2016)
- Man with the Binoculars: Antardrishti (2016)
- Konwarpurar Konwar (2017)
- Ishu (2017)
- Bhoga Khidikee (2018)
- Ratnakar (2019)
- Pratighaat (2019)

== Awards and honours ==
Bishnu Kharghoria won two National Film Award, India "Special Mention" for Xagoroloi Bohudoor in 1995 and Baandhon in 2012. He also won the "Best Actor" award in Singapore International Film Festival in 1996 for Xagoroloi Bohudoor. He won the Best Actor title for two times in Prag Cine Awards in 2013 for Baandhon and in 2017 for Man with Binoculars: Antardrishti. He also won the Lifetime Achievement Award for his excellence in the movie industry in 2015, by Prag Cine Awards. He received the Biju Phukan Award from Cultural Affairs Department, Government of Assam in 2019.
