= Tara (Assamese actress) =

Indian film actress (1944–2007)

Tara (3 August 1944 in Imphal, Manipur – 19 May 2007 in Gauhati, Assam) was an Indian actress, who worked in Assamese, Manipuri, Punjabi and Hindi films in a career extending more than 50 years. Her prominent features include Halodhia Choraye Baodhan Khai (which won the National Film Award for Best Feature Film in 1988), Banaras: A Mystic Love Story, and Shakuntala (directed by Bhupen Hazarika).

== Filmography ==
- Kahani Gudiya Ki (2007)
- Banaras: A Mystic Love Story (2006)
- Jee Aayan Nu (2003)
- Meemanxa or The Verdict (1994)
- Ishanou or The Chosen One (1990)
- Ajala Kokai (1989)
- Kolahal or The Turmoil (1988)
- Halodhia Choraye Baodhan Khai or The Catastrophe or The Yellow Birds (1987)
- Sandhya Raag (1977)
- Aranya (1971)
- Aparajeya or The Unvanquished (1970)
- Dr. Bezbarua (1969)
- Maram Trishna (1968)
- Ito Sito Bahuto or Lots of Things Around (1963)
- Shakuntala (1961)
- Ranga Police or Red-Capped Police (1958)
- Mak Aru Marom or Mother and Love (1957)
