= Dipak Sarma =

Indian flutist (1968–2025)

- Born: 23 August 1968; Panigaon, Undivided Kamrup district, Assam, India
- Died: 3 November 2025 (aged 57) Chennai, Tamil Nadu, India
- Genres: Classical
- Occupation: Flutist
- Instrument: Flute
- Years active: 1987–2025

Dipak Sarma (23 August 1968 – 3 November 2025) was an Indian flutist from the state of Assam.

In late 2025, Sarma became critically ill and underwent treatment in Guwahati. He died on 3 November 2025 at the age of 57 in Chennai.

== Works ==
=== Music director ===
- Jonky Panoi
- Jatinga Ityadi
- Working on Luitak Vetibo Kune

=== Discography ===
- Story of Love released by Raaga and Rocks International Company Ltd.
- Beyond the Horizon

=== In television serials ===
- Sharma composed music for Karm and Wazir broadcast on Zee TV and also featured in an instrumental jugalbandi of classical and western music.
- He played flute for the background music of Kaleidoscope on Star Plus.

== Awards ==
- Best Musician of the year 2006 (N.E.T.V. Private Channel)
- Sangeet Prabha Awards. (2007)
- Assam Sports Cultural Jury Award. (2007)
- Jams of Assam. (2008)
- Azim Hazarika Award. (Sivasagar Press Club)
