= Binod Pradhan =

Indian cinematographer, director and actor

- Born: Kalimpong, India
- Occupation: Cinematographer

Binod Pradhan is an Indian cinematographer, director and actor. He has worked in several popular and acclaimed films as a cinematographer. Some of his award-winning films include 1942 A Love Story, Devdas, Rang De Basanti, Mission Kashmir, and Munna Bhai M.B.B.S.

== Biography ==
Binod grew up in the picturesque hill town of Kalimpong, West Bengal. He attended secondary schooling at the Dr. Graham's Homes School in Kalimpong, India, in the eastern Himalayas. Coming from a humble Nepali Newar background, Binod got his first box camera in the early years from his father, H. K. Pradhan, who ran a photo studio. Binod would shoot black-and-white pictures and try and colour them using water-paints. He was often caught shooting unknown portraits and making prints of them. Displeased at first, his father recognized his work and most of Binod's images landed up on the display case of the studio and he was rewarded with an Asahi Pentax. Binod and his camera were pretty much inseparable and by the age of 14, he was running things at the studio.

Soon found the isolated life at Kalimpong was a hindrance for taking up photography as a career option. There was no formal forum to learn new techniques and share his experience. On hearing about FTII in Pune, he approached the institute with his portfolio and was admitted into a three-year course in cinematography.

The break into films came when film director Prem Sagar came to the institute to judge the students' work. Impressed with Binod's work, Prem Sagar immediately offered him the job of an assistant at Sagar Arts. He went on to assist Prem Sagar on the Dharam-Hema Malini starrers, Charas and Ram Bharose. Realizing that he was not making his identity in the huge industry, he started looking at other options. Ace cameraman A. K. Bir, who was working on a film Gharonda offered him the job of assistant cameraman, in charge of the zoom and focus department. This proved to be a very useful internship.

Work soon dried up and he often found himself changing addresses very often. Few sporadic assignments like documentaries (for Durga Khote productions), ads and corporate films helped improve his technical skills.

During this period, he lived with a Kutchi family and this was when he met Dolly. He fell in love with Dolly, and was unable to convince her parents. Resorting to desperate measures, he eloped with her back to Kalimpong. They soon had their first-born, Binay. Out-of-work Binod devoted himself completely to raising him. He also has a second son named Deep Pradhan.

Slowly, old friends approached him with work assignments. He worked with Mani Kaul on the celluloid version of Ghashiram Kotwal and did Jabbar Patel's Jait Re Jait. The Assamese film Apa Roopa happened then.

The dry spell finally broke when Kundan Shah started gathering all his mates from FTII for the film Jaane Bhi Do Yaaro.

== Filmography ==
=== As cinematographer ===
Year	Movie	Language	Notes
1976	Ghashiram Kotwal	Marathi	
1977	Jait Re Jait	Marathi	
1982	Aparoopa	Assamese	
1983	Jaane Bhi Do Yaaro	Hindi	
1983	Samjhana	Nepali	
1985	Khamosh	Hindi	
1985	Kusume Rumal	Nepali	
1986	Papori	Assamese	
1989	Lahure	Nepali	
1989	Parinda	Hindi	
1991	Narasimha	Hindi	
1992	Trishna	Nepali	
1992	Sapana	Nepali	
1992	Raju Ban Gaya Gentleman	Hindi	
1993	1942: A Love Story	Hindi	
1998	Kareeb	Hindi	
2000	Mission Kashmir	Hindi	
2002	Devdas	Hindi	
2003	Munna Bhai M.B.B.S.	Hindi	
2005	Dil Jo Bhi Kahey...	Hindi	
2006	Rang De Basanti	Hindi	
2007	Ta Ra Rum Pum	Hindi	
2007	Nanhe Jaisalmer	Hindi	
2008	Kismat Konnection	Hindi	
2008	Heroes	Hindi	
2009	Delhi-6	Hindi	
2010	Komaram Puli	Telugu	
2011	Yamla Pagla Deewana	Hindi	
2011	Mausam	Hindi	
2013	Rajjo	Hindi	
2013	Bhaag Milkha Bhaag	Hindi	
2014	2 States	Hindi	
2014	Ishq Wala Love	Marathi	
2016	Baaghi	Hindi	
2018	Kayamkulam Kochunni	Malayalam	
2019	Kalank	Hindi	
2021	Chehre	Hindi	
2024	Adbhut	Hindi	

=== As director ===
Year	Movie	Language	Notes
2015	Wedding Pullav	Hindi	

=== As associate director ===
Year	Movie	Language	Notes
1993	1942: A Love Story	Hindi	
1998	Kareeb	Hindi	
2000	Mission Kashmir	Hindi	

=== As actor ===
Year	Movie	Language	Notes
2018	Pahuna: The Little Visitors	Nepali	

== Awards and nominations ==
List of documented awards for Best Cinematography

=== International Indian Film Academy Awards ===
- 2003 Won for the film Devdas
- 2001 Won for the film Mission Kashmir

=== Filmfare Awards ===
- 2013 Won for Bhaag Milkha Bhaag
- 2007 Won for Rang De Basanti
- 2003 Won for Devdas
- 2001 Nominated for Mission Kashmir

=== Screen Weekly Awards ===
- 2007 Won for the film Rang De Basanti
- 2004 Nominated for the film Munna Bhai M.B.B.S.
- 2003 Won for the film Devdas
- 2001 Won for the film Mission Kashmir
- 1998 Won for the film Kareeb
- 1994 Won for the film 1942: A Love Story

=== Zee Cine Awards ===
- 2007 Won for the film Rang De Basanti
- 2004 Won for the film Munna Bhai M.B.B.S.
- 2003 Won for the film Devdas

=== Global Cinema Festival Sikkim ===
- 2020 Lifetime Achievement Award
