= Azan Faqir =

Indian Sufi saint

Azan Faqir (Arabic: أذان فقير),(Assamese : আজান ফকীৰ) born Shah Miran, also known as Ajan Pir, Hazrat Shah Miran, and Shah Milan (presumably from Miran), was a Sufi, poet, Muslim preacher and saint from the 17th century who came from Badaun in Uttar Pradesh to settle in the Sibsagar area of Assam in the north-eastern part of India, where he helped to unify the people of the Brahmaputra valley, and to reform, reinforce and stabilise Islam in the region of Assam. The nickname Azan came from his habit of calling azan.

According to one version his name was "Hazarat Shah Syed Mainuddin". He is known for his Zikr and Zari, two forms of devotional songs, that draw from local musical traditions and have striking similarities with borgeets of Srimanta Sankardeva, the 16th-century saint-scholar from Assam. In addition, the late renowned author and Sahitya Akademi award winner Syed Abdul Malik states that Azan Fakir was a preacher with profound mastery over the Qur’an, the Hadith and Islamic philosophy.

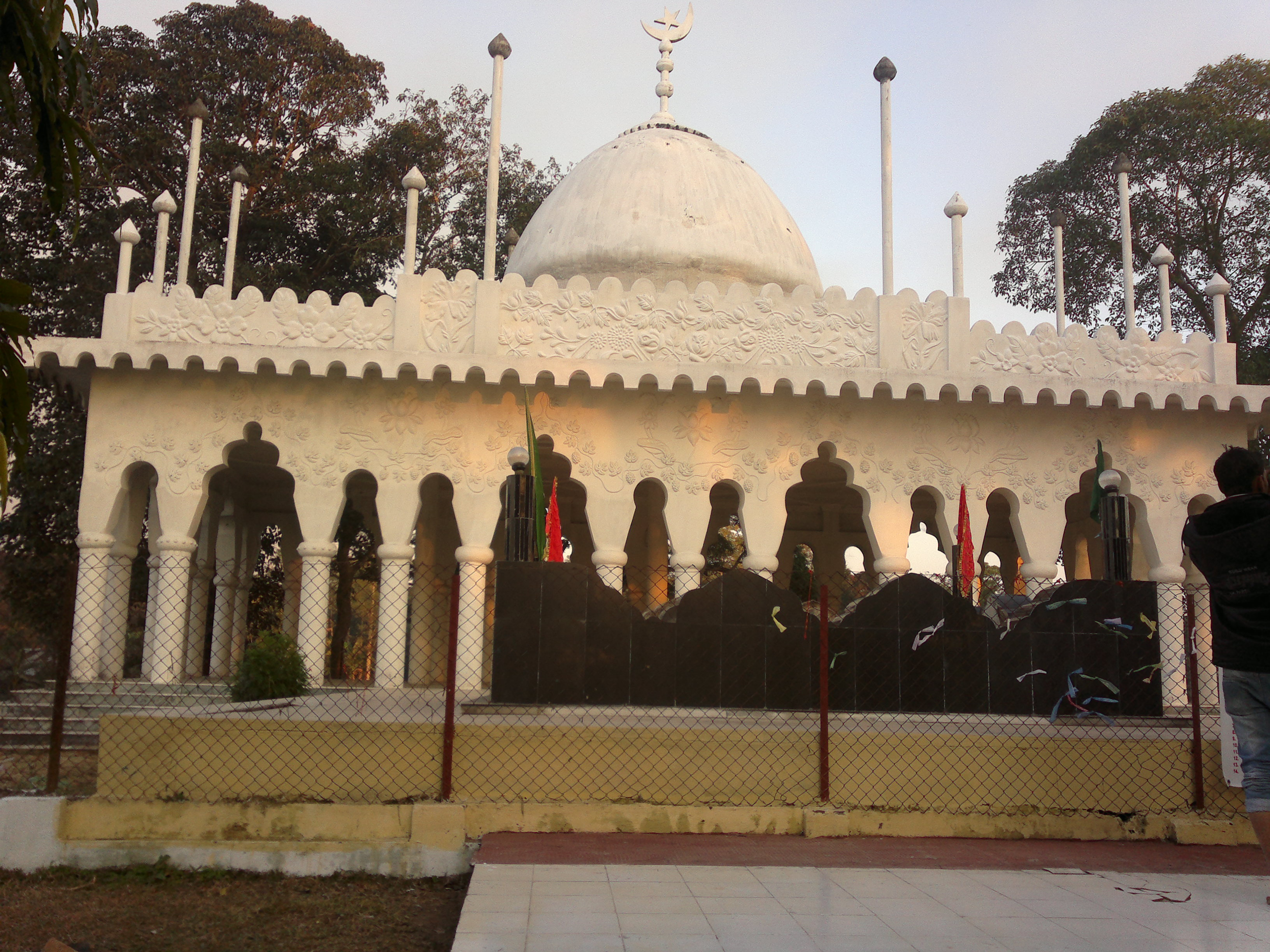
Hajarat Ajan Pir Dargaah, Horaguri Chapori, Sivasagar

== Career ==
Azan Fakir was a disciple of Khwaja Nizamuddin Auliya. He came to Assam accompanied by his brother Shah Navi. He married the daughter of a Muslim named Syed Usman Gani of Khandokar village in Rangpur, Assam.

== The conspiracy ==
In course of time his influence spread, he acquired a good number of followers and earned the enmity of an Ahom official, Rupai Baruah Dadhora (Rupai Phuke-mit), who by conspiracy convinced the Ahom king that Azan Fakir was a Mughal spy and had orders passed for plucking out the Pir's eyes. The Pir, according to some songs, had two earthen pots brought into which he let his "two eyes drop".He then asked the soldiers to throw the pots into the nearby Dikhow River instead of taking them to the King.

== Aftermath ==
The king was alarmed and for atonement made land grants to Ajan Fakir at Soraguri Chapari, near Sibsagar and had a matha built for him. This place on the bank of Brahmaputra has become a holy place with Ajan Pir's Dargah where an annual urs is held. His dargah is at Saraguri Chapari near Sibsagar town.

== Works ==
Azan Fakir composed 160 zikir and zari but 90 only recovered.

== See also ==
- Ajan Faquir Saheb, a 2008 Assamese-language film about him....
- Islam in Assam
- Jari Gan
