= Aamis =

2019 Indian romantic horror film

- Official film poster
- Directed by: Bhaskar Hazarika
- Written by: Bhaskar Hazarika
- Produced by: Shyam Bora; Poonam Deol
- Starring: Lima Das; Arghadeep Baruah
- Cinematography: Riju Das
- Edited by: Shweta Rai Chamling
- Music by: Quan Bay
- Production companies: Signum Productions; Metanormal Motion Pictures; Wishberry Films
- Release dates: 28 April 2019 (TFF); 22 November 2019 (India)
- Running time: 108 minutes
- Country: India
- Language: Assamese

Aamis (English: Ravening) is a 2019 Indian Assamese-language romantic horror film written and directed by Bhaskar Hazarika. It explores taboo themes through an unconventional love story centered around food, obsession, and the macabre.

The film was produced by Signum Productions and Metanormal Motion Pictures, with Shyam Bora and Poonam Deol producing. It stars Lima Das and Arghadeep Baruah in the lead roles.

== Background ==
The development process was marked by meticulous research into Assamese cuisine, which plays a pivotal role in the narrative, due to the story's setting. Aamis had its world premiere at the Tribeca Film Festival, where it was nominated in five categories in the festival's "International Narrative" section. It was released in India on 22 November 2019.

== Plot ==
Sumon is a PhD student who researches meat-eating habits of the people of Northeast India and cooks various meat dishes for his friends as a hobby. Nirmali is a doctor who feels unsatisfied with her marriage, and she constantly covers up for her friend Jumi, who is having an extramarital affair. Sumon and Nirmali meet when she has to treat his friend for indigestion, and they form a friendship over an interest in food. Sumon cooks meat dishes for Nirmali and takes her to various eateries as their friendship progresses. Soon, he starts obsessing over her, to the detriment of his studies. Nirmali's marriage worsens, and she begins spending more time with Sumon, though she does not reciprocate his feelings.

As his obsession gets out of hand, Sumon approaches his friend Elias, a vet, to cut off a part of his flesh, ostensibly for research. In truth, he plans to cook and serve it to Nirmali, as a way to make their bond stronger. Nirmali eats the dish, assuming it to be something else, and enjoys it more than anything she has ever tasted. When Sumon reveals its actual ingredients, Nirmali is disgusted at first, but she soon starts craving human flesh.

The relationship gradually becomes twisted, as they begin feeding each other their flesh in turn. Nirmali's addiction intensifies, and she ends up craving a large portion of human flesh to satiate her hunger. To help her, Sumon kills a rickshaw driver but is caught in the act. The police discover his connection to Nirmali through their texts and apprehend her as well, and their arrest and exposure as cannibals causes a local scandal. At the police station, Sumon and Nirmali hold hands as they are presented in front of the media, with their faces covered.

== Cast ==
- Lima Das as Nirmali Saikia
- Arghadeep Baruah as Sumon
- Neetali Das as Jumi
- Sagar Saurabh as Elias Ahmad
- Manash K Das as Dilip
- Utkal Hazowari as Inspector
- Chandan Bhuyan as Bora
- Samarjyoti Sarkar as Rickshaw driver
- Siddharth Boro as Eddie
- Momee Borah as Mina
- Jishnu Kashyap as Pikoo
- Uddipta K Bhattacharya as Sumon's friend

== Production ==
Fresh off of his success from his 2015 directorial debut, Kothanodi, Bhaskar Hazarika knew his next project would be tough to pitch. Due to the taboo nature of the subject material, Hazarika sought out a tactful approach to address the topic without infringing on censorship protocol. In April 2024, he addressed this directly, saying, "Now, the Censor Board can cut scenes, but not ideas".

When asked how the concept for the film developed, Hazarika mentioned watching a video of people eating a non-vegetarian meal. This sparked the idea for a concept he referred to as "not a dark love story but a sad one... a Romeo and Juliet kind of love story", covering themes of "repression, addiction, and the consequences of committing crimes".

In many ways, Hazarika has attempted to shift away from Bollywood tradition, relishing in the flexibility of independent film. He opted to cast unknown actors due to the film's limited budget. The film was the acting debut for Lima Das, who is a doctor and dancer in real life.

There are distinct similarities between Kothanodi and Aamis, stemming largely from the strange and gritty horror elements, but the director himself notes a stark difference: whereas Kothanodi was a "sledgehammer – elemental and raw, Aamis is all about feel".

== Reception ==
Deborah Young for The Hollywood Reporter wrote, "One would have liked the story to end on some unexpected note of unfettered imagination in keeping with the defiant spirit of what has gone before. The moralistic ending really takes it down a notch." Anannya Baruah for HuffPost wrote, "Meat isn't just Nirmali and Sumon's means of sublimating their desire and feeling better about not committing adultery; it has always been the object of caste, religious and regional discrimination—a rationalisation for the violent dehumanisation of certain bodies." Allan Hunter for Screen Daily, invoking echoes of The Lunchbox, wrote, "The delicate, decorous nature of the relationship is sweetly captured. Hazarika encourages our investment in the couple and how they might engineer a future together. Affection is expressed in shy smiles and lingering glances. Arghadeep is particularly good at conveying the doe-eyed devotion of Sumon. There is an echo of The Lunchbox in a film that might, initially at least, beguile food lovers and incurable romantics alike."

A critic from Hindustan Times wrote, "A Serbian Film, Aamis is exactly what you get when you suffocate unsuspecting people under systems of oppression." Deccan Chronicle wrote, "The film devotes a lot of time to cooking, eating, chatting, texting, and the screenplay, full of dialogue and detailed cooking and eating scenes, delivers it all with a beaming smile and a powerful comment on the politics of food." Shubhra Gupta of The Indian Express praised Hazarika and wrote, "Not for the faint-hearted or squeamish, Aamis is an unusual, brilliant film, and Hazarika one of India's most gifted filmmakers." News18 wrote, "There is a lot of meat eating; the food shots are lovingly composed. The film suggests that just like we all have different tastes and appetites when it comes to food, we also have varied moral palates and desires."

The Wire wrote, "The assertions that 'love by itself is enough' or 'love solves everything' seem disconnected from the larger truth: that love can also be evil, that love – or say, obsession – can cross a line, too." A critic from The Quint wrote, "In a film where every frame is so thoughtfully done, the climax was a dampener. But there's redemption in the final shot where both Sumon and Nirmali touch each other for the first time." Ishrat Jahan Holy for The Business Standard wrote, "Aamis is a bold genius of Bhaskar Hazarika and it relies on its slow revelations. As the film progresses, it gently comes out from its The Lunchbox-esque atmosphere and takes the darkest possible turn."

== Awards ==
- Singapore South Asian International Film Festival: Best Director (Bhaskar Hazarika) and Best Female Actor (Lima Das)
- Sailadhar Baruah Memorial Film Awards: Best Actor – female (Lima Das), Best Music (Quan Bay), Best Sound Design (Gautam Nair)
- Assam State Film Awards 2019: Best Direction, Best Music, Best Audiography, Best Screenplay, Best Actress
- Imagine India: Best Actress (Lima Das) – nominated
