= Ajan Faquir Saheb =

- A Screenshot
- Directed by: Asif Iqbal Hussain
- Written by: Prabhat Goswami
- Produced by: Bani Kalita; Prabin Lahkar (Executive)
- Starring: Bishnu Kharghoria; Prithwiraj Rabha; Arun Nath; Moloya Goswami
- Cinematography: Paresh Baruah
- Music by: Dwijen Konwar; Hafiza Begum Choudhury; Tulika Lahkar
- Distributed by: Samannay Films
- Release date: 25 April 2008
- Country: India
- Language: Assamese

Ajan Faquir Saheb is an Assamese language biographical film produced by Bani Kalita and directed by Asif Iqbal Hussain. The film was released on 25 April 2008. The film is based on the life of Ajan Fakir, the Sufi saint and poet who came to Assam from Baghdad.

== Production ==
Both Bishnu Kharghoria and Jayanta Bhagawati had to learn things like offering namaj besides learning some words of Urdu and Arabic to play the characters effectively.

== Cast and characters ==
- Bishnu Kharghoria as Azan Fakir,
- Prithviraj Rabha as Nabi Pir
- Jayanta Bhagawati as Moulabi
- Arun Nath as Gadadhar Singha, the Ahom king
- Moloya Goswami as Jaymati Kunwari, the queen

== Awards ==
Awards received by the film are:

- Chitralekha Award of the United TV and Filmmakers Association for Best Assamese Film of 2008
- Best director – Asif Iqbal
- Best music director – Dwijen Konwar
- Best screenplay writer – Prabhat Goswami
- Best supporting actress – Malaya Goswami.

== See also ==
- Jollywood
