= Sailadhar Baruah =

Indian film producer (1941–2010)

- Born: December 1941; North Guwahati, Assam
- Died: 10 January 2010 (aged 68); International Hospital, Guwahati
- Occupation: Film producer
- Years active: 1986–2010

Sailadhar Baruah (December 1941 – 10 January 2010) was a film producer from Assam, India. He is best remembered for his visionary contribution to Assamese Cinema as the producer of some of the greatest Assamese movies ever made, such as Halodhia Choraye Baodhan Khai and Xagoroloi Bohudoor.

== Early life and education ==
He was born to Shri Padma Dhar Baruah and Smt Makanrekha Baruah in North Guwahati in December 1941. He remained a lifelong bachelor and had three brothers and a sister. Baruah did his schooling from Cotton Collegiate Higher Secondary School and graduated in Science from Pragjyotish College at Guwahati.

== Career ==
He has produced a number of critically acclaimed films many of which have won national as well as international awards. He has a long association with eminent director Jahnu Barua. He also did a commissioned programme for Doordarshan titled Shruti Madhur in 2005. Apart from film making he was a sportsman and cultural activist. He along with a few friends founded the Kristhi Vikas Sangha, a socio-cultural club. He was also the founder chairman and current director of the Assam Institute of Mass Communications and Research.

== Death ==
On 1 January 2010, Baruah was admitted at International Hospital. He was suffering from diabetes and heart ailments. On 10 January 2010, at 2:30pm he died while in the hospital. Chief Minister of Assam Tarun Gogoi condoled Baruah's death saying his death created a void in the State's cultural and entertainment arena. The All Guwahati Students' Union has also mourned the death of Baruah and paid their last respect visiting his residence. His body was taken to his Panbazar office (Baruah Medicos), Assam Institute of Mass Communication and Media Research, Uzanbazar, and Ravindra Bhavan and then the last rites were performed at Navagraha crematorium on 11 January 2010.

== Sailadhar Baruah Film Awards ==
The Sailadhar Baruah Film Awards were established in 2010 by the Sailadhar Baruah Trust to recognize achievements in cinema from the Northeastern region of India. The awards are presented annually across various categories.

== Filmography ==
- Papori
- Halodhia Choraye Baodhan Khai (1988)
- Firingoti (1991)
- Xagoroloi Bohudoor (1995)
- Kushal (1998)
- Pokhi (1998)
- Konikar Ramdhenu (2003)
- Tora (2004)

== See also ==
- Jollywood
