= Lou Majaw =

Indian musician (born 1947)

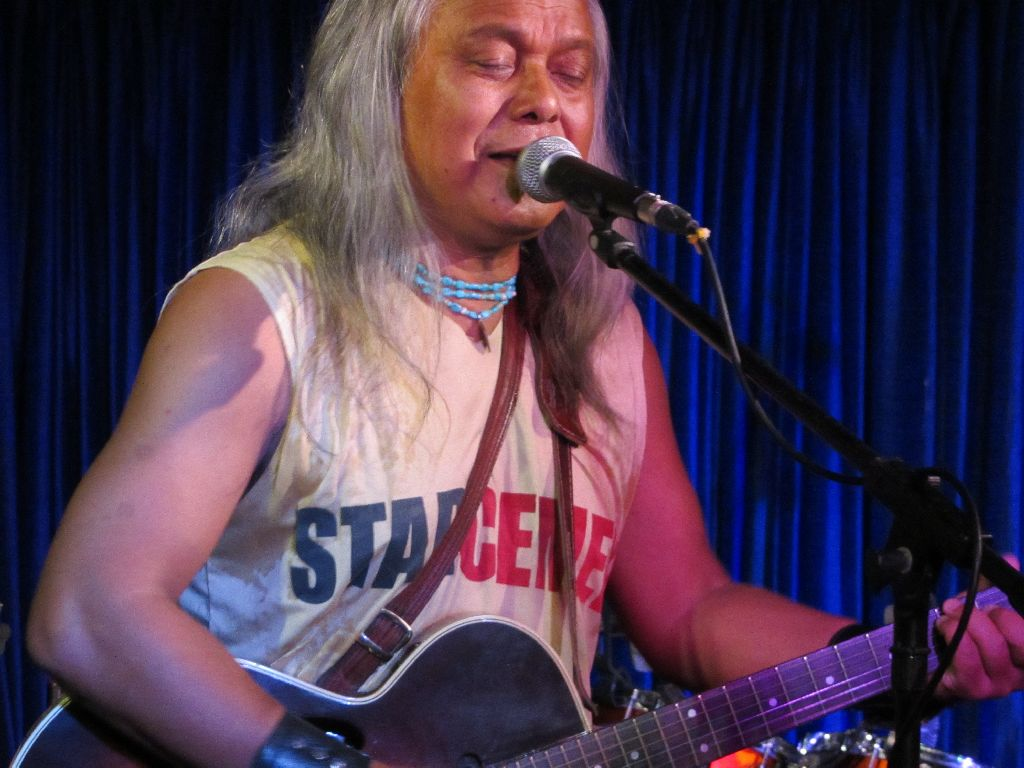
- Majaw performing in 2011

Background information
- Born: 1947 (age 78–79)
- Origin: Shillong, Meghalaya, India
- Genres: Rock; folk rock; blues
- Occupation: Musician
- Instruments: Guitar; vocals
- Formerly of: Dynamite Boys; Vanguards; Supersound Factory; Blood and Thunder

Lou Majaw (born 1947) is an Indian musician from Shillong, Meghalaya, known for his Bob Dylan tribute shows.

Born into a poor family, Majaw could not afford to own any musical instruments as a child. In a friend's house, he was introduced to the music of Bill Haley and Elvis Presley, and he taught himself to play guitar at school. Majaw eventually moved to Kolkata, where he sang in bars and pubs for various groups, such as the Dynamite Boys, Vanguards, Supersound Factory, and Blood and Thunder. Majaw discovered Bob Dylan's music in 1964 and nearly a decade later, in 1972, organized the first Dylan tribute concert in his hometown; he has maintained the tradition every year since.

On 24 October 2016, Majaw received the Bhupen Hazarika Award from the governor of Assam for his lifelong contribution to music.

In 2023, a documentary film about Majaw's life, titled The Platinum Gong, was released. It was directed by Sattyakee D'com Bhuyan.

In 2024, Majaw was awarded an honorary Doctor of Letters degree by the University of Science and Technology, Meghalaya.
