= Bhaskar Hazarika =

Indian film director

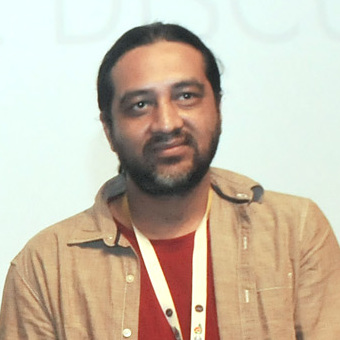
- Image of Bhaskar Hazarika in 2017
- Occupations: Film director, writer, producer

Bhaskar Hazarika is a National Film Awards-winning Indian film director who makes films in Assamese language. His notable films include Kothanodi (2015), Aamis (2019), and Emuthi Puthi (2022) (as a writer). He is known for exploring dark and complex themes in his films. Kothanodi and Emuthi Puthi won National Film Award for Best Assamese Feature Film in the respective years.
