= Papori =

- A screenshot
- Directed by: Jahnu Barua
- Written by: Jahnu Barua
- Produced by: Sailadhar Baruah
- Starring: Gopi Desai; Biju Phukan; Sushil Goswami; Chetana Das; Dulal Roy
- Cinematography: Binod Pradhan
- Music by: Satya Baruah; P. P. Vidyanathan
- Production company: Dolphin Films Pvt. Ltd
- Release date: 1986
- Running time: 144 minutes
- Country: India
- Language: Assamese

Papori is a 1986 Indian Assamese language feature film directed by Jahnu Barua. The film stars Gopi Desai, Biju Phukan, Sushil Goswami, Chetana Das and Dulal Roy. The film was released in 1986.

== Plot summary ==
The film is set against the political background of the Assam agitation during the 1983 election. It is a story about Papori whose husband Binod is falsely arrested for her murder. A smuggler rapes Papori and her husband is convicted for it. Phukan, a police inspector, finds the true murderer but cannot arrest him because he enjoys political protection. During this time, her daughter ends up in the hospital, where she eventually dies.

== Cast and characters ==
- Gopi Desai as Papori
- Sushil Goswami as Binod
- Biju Phukan as Police inspector

== See also ==
- Jollywood
