= Agnisnaan =

1985 film

- Poster
- Directed by: Bhabendra Nath Saikia
- Written by: Bhabendra Nath Saikia
- Produced by: Bhabendra Nath Saikia
- Starring: Indra Bania; Kashmiri Saikia Baruah; Chetana Das; Ashok Deka; Moloya Goswami; Arjun Guha Thakuria; Arun Nath; Biju Phukan; Arati Barua
- Cinematography: Kamal Nayak
- Edited by: Nikunja Bhattacharya
- Music by: Tarun Goswami
- Release date: 1985
- Running time: 172 minutes
- Country: India
- Language: Assamese

Agnisnaan is a 1985 Indian Assamese language drama film directed by Bhabendra Nath Saikia. The film is based on Saikia's novel titled Antareep. The film starred Indra Bania, Kashmiri Saikia Baruah, Chetana Das, Ashok Deka, Moloya Goswami, Arjun Guha Thakuria, Arun Nath and Biju Phukan.

== Plot ==
The story revolves around a wealthy businessman who opts for a second marriage. This decision shocks and angers his first wife and his son. It is a story on human psychology along with an off-beat story line. How his first wife feels cheated in her unquestionable love and dedication to him and how she takes revenge is the basis of the story.

== Awards ==
- National Award 'Best Screenplay' to Dr. Bhabendra Nath Saikia in 1985
- National award 'Rajat Kamal' for best Regional Film in 1985
- Selected for 'Indian Panorama'
- Selected for Nantes Film Festival, France
- Selected for Pyongyang Film Festival, North Korea
- Selected for Dhaka Film Festival, Bangladesh
- Selected for Silver Jubilee Festival of Independence, Algeria

== Synopsis (Ordeal) ==
The story is set in the late 1930s in a small town. It is inhabited by various impoverished people including a fisherman from Bengal named Madan, a thief who spends a considerable time of the year in police custody named Phool and a widow who is reportedly having an affair with the policeman on night duty in the area.

In this locality, Ghanakanta is the well-to-do person, loved and respected by his neighbours. In his old age, he handed over the family responsibilities to his sons, Rantakanta, Mohikanta and Bhadrakanta, having no livelihood of his own.

Mohikanta, a man with the characteristics of feudal vanity and conceit, comes in contact with a British Deputy Commissioner of the district, who helps him in establishing a ricemill in the town. The mill works like a mint, making Mohikanta richer and richer. He marries Menoka, an upright, beautiful girl of a cultured family. Menoka makes herself a charming, devoted wife, and in course of time becomes the mother of four children. Mohikanta aided by lust, vanity, money and liquor, becomes a source of constant irritation to the family; but Menoka, with her love, tolerance and magnanimity preserves the family's happiness.

Mohikanta often goes to the nearby villages to arrange paddy for his rice mill. On one of his visits to a certain village he comes across Kiran, a beautiful young girl of a very poor family. One day, to the utter dismay of everyone around, Mohikanta rides on an elephant at the head of a marriage procession and makes Kiran his second wife.

A composed Menoka accepts the entire episode with apparent calm. She rearranges her bedroom to accommodate her four children, while Mohikanta moves into a new bedroom along with Kiran. Menoka accepts Kiran with stoic affection.

Mohikanta's old parents, already subdued by his impertinence, are resigned to their fate and become silent spectators. But Bhadrakanta and his friend Madan, the thief, become indignant. Indra, the eldest son of Menoka, morose and bewildered, unwittingly moves closer and closer to Bhadrakanta and Madan, as if to find out a means of relief for his mother, and a way for some kind of revenge on his father.

After the first flush of excitement of the second marriage is over, Mohikanta desires the company of Menoka. One night, he knocks at Menoka's door. She tells him in categorical terms that she has accepted everything that Mohikanta has brought to her, but that he must likewise accept one condition ̶ that he must not touch her. Never again.

Mohikanta, who wants to enjoy everything around him, becomes furious, brutal and increasingly unscrupulous.

Menoka, though determined not to submit her body to Mohikanta any more, her thirty-two-year-old flesh and mind keep her sweating, especially when the midnight music from Kiran's bedroom wafts into her ears. She continues to fight with herself, with her four children around her in sleep.

One night, Indra silently unbolts a door of the bedroom, goes outside and after a while returns to his bed again. He takes Menoka in the nearby bed to be fast asleep. But she is not. After some moments, she hears a sound outside. She wants to find out for herself what it is and opens the door. It is Madan, the thief, trembling, flabbergasted.

First, the bewildered Menoka immediately collects herself and takes Madan to a solitary place beneath the bamboo grove at the back of the house. She asks Madan to sit on a log lying there. She sits down besides him and asks Madan pointedly why he has come there.

Madan breaks down and tells Menoka that he finds it difficult to bear her silent sufferings and Mohikanta's tyranny any more. He is convinced that it is money and property that has made Mohikanta a brute. Therefore, he decides to give a chastening blow by stealing at least some of his valuables. Impelled by this thirst for revenge, he persuaded Indra to help him from inside the house.

Overwhelmed with the feelings Madan reveals towards her, Menoka remains silent. She then advises him not to involve Indra in these affairs. But before leaving Madan, she impulsively asks him to come to the same spot at the same time the following night. Only after returning to her bed does Menoka begin asking herself, "Why, why had she asked Madan to come again?"

It is only the game of fate that saves her the following night.

A series of complicated events follow. Mohikanta's mother dies leaving old Ghanakanta desolate, forlorn. Kiran leaves for a couple of months to stay with her mother, just before the birth of her first child. Mohikanta appoints Madan as manager of the rice mill. Madan proves himself to be a trustworthy, devoted worker, but remains utterly perplexed at the behaviour of Menoka. In the absence of Kiran, Mohikanta becomes more bewildered, maddened and one night he drives Menoka to the wall. Still determined to remain a good mother and a good housewife, Menoka refuses to submit to Mohikanta. Surging through the confused streams of emotions and impulses ̶ love, anger, misery and an inexplicable hunger ̶ is a strong, ever burning desire for revenge. Events drive her to a point when she invites Madan to the solitary place beneath the bamboo grove at midnight. They meet for several nights.

One night Menoka breaks down in tears and asks Madan to forget everything and cease contact with her.

Kiran comes with a baby girl in her arms. It is Menoka who takes up the responsibility of rearing the baby. And Kiran discovers that Menoka is pregnant. All the time, she has been under the impression that Menoka did not permit Mohikanta any physical contact with her. For the first time, as the second wife of Mohikanta, she feels hurt and accuses him of being dishonest.

Mohikanta erupts like a volcano. He has not even touched Menoka after he married Kiran. He becomes restless in his maddening anguish and takes Menoka to the rice mill. There he asks Menoka if what he has heard is true. "Very true," Menoka confesses. "But how?" Mohikanta roars at her.

Menoka tells him not to expect an answer to that question in his entire lifetime. Before the frowning face of Mohikanta, in the midst of the noise of the machines of the rice mill, Menoka gradually transforms herself into a representative of womanhood ̶ trampled, oppressed ̶ now raising her head in rebellion. "I wanted to be a Sita," she tells Mohikanta, "but should there not be a Rama as well if there is to be a Sita (kept protected)?"

== See also ==
- Jollywood
