= Aparoopa =

- Directed by: Jahnu Barua
- Written by: Jahnu Barua; J. S. Rao
- Produced by: Jahnu Barua
- Starring: Biju Phukan; Suhasini Mulay; Sushil Goswami; Dulal Roy; Girish Karnad; Farooq Sheikh; Jagdeep; Kulbhushan Kharbanda; Neelam; Sushma Seth; Indra Bania
- Cinematography: Binod Pradhan
- Edited by: Jahnu Barua
- Music by: Bhupen Hazarika
- Production company: Dolphin Films Pvt. Ltd
- Distributed by: National Film Development Corporation of India
- Release date: 1982
- Running time: 124 minutes
- Country: India
- Languages: Assamese and Hindi

Aparoopa is a 1982 Indian Assamese language drama film directed by Jahnu Barua. It is the first feature film of the director and also the first Assamese film produced by National Film Development Corporation of India. It stars Biju Phukan, Suhasini Mulay, Sushil Goswami and Girish Karnad. The Hindi-language version is titled Apeksha.

== Plot ==
In the colonial upper class society of Assam, a young woman has to give up pursuit of her university education for an arranged marriage with a rich tea-planter. The plantation and its social routine become a prison of boredom for her since her husband completely neglects her for his business. She is outraged when she discovers that her marriage takes place in order to eliminate her father's huge debt. She considers herself as having been sold to her husband. Then one day an old classmate and ex-lover, now an army officer, visits them. Depressed, she is drawn to him as she seeks fulfillment.

== Casts and characters ==
- Suhasini Mulay as Aparoopa
- Biju Phukan as Rana
- Sushma Seth as Rana's mother
- Gopi Desai as Radha
- Hiranya Deka as Ramu
- Nipon Goswami as Jeevan
- Indra Bania as Anil
- Girish Karnad as Mr. Khanna

== Award ==
- Best Feature Film in Assamese (1982)

== See also ==
- Jollywood
