= Bonani =

- Directed by: Jahnu Barua
- Written by: Sushil Goswami; Jahnu Baruah
- Produced by: Dolphin Films Pvt. Ltd
- Starring: Bishnu Kharghoria; Sushil Goswami; Monami Bezbaruah
- Cinematography: Anoop Jotwani
- Edited by: Heu-en Borah
- Music by: Satya Baruah; Prashanta Bordoloi
- Production company: Purbanchal Film Cooperative Society
- Distributed by: Dolphin Films Pvt. Ltd
- Release date: 1989
- Running time: 108 minutes
- Country: India
- Language: Assamese

Bonani (The Forest) is a 1989 Assamese language drama film directed by Jahnu Barua, starring Sushil Goswami, Bishnu Kharghoria and Monami Bezbaruah. The film is set with an ecological angle and won the National Film Award for Best Film on Environment.

== Plot summary ==
The film centres on a forest ranger who confronts illegal timber merchants and contractors on behalf of the impoverished tribal people. His actions result his frequent transfers that annoys his wife who wants to settle down and look after their ailing children. Eventually she stands by her husband in his fight and the tribal people also realise that they need a weapon to defend themselves.

== Casts ==
- Mridula Baruah
- Sushil Goswami
- Bishnu Kharghoria
- Golap Dutta
- Lakshmi Sinha
- Munin Sharma
- Jyoti Bhattacharya
- Shasanka Sebo Phukan

== Awards ==
- National Film Awards – Best Film on Environment

== See also ==
- Jollywood Assamese
