= Schmetterlinge =

1988 West German film

- Directed by: Wolfgang Becker
- Release date: 1988
- Country: West Germany

Schmetterlinge (English: Butterflies) is a West German film directed by Wolfgang Becker. It won the Golden Leopard at the 1988 Locarno International Film Festival.

== Reception ==
It won the Golden Leopard at the 1988 Locarno International Film Festival.
