= Firingoti =

Firingoti The Spark
- A Screenshot
- Directed by: Jahnu Barua
- Written by: Jahnu Barua
- Produced by: Sailadhar Baruah
- Starring: Bishnu Kharghoria; Moloya Goswami; Chetana Das; Hemen Choudhury
- Cinematography: Anoop Jotwani
- Edited by: Heu-en Baruah; Ranjit Das
- Music by: Satya Baruah
- Distributed by: Dolphin Films Pvt. Ltd
- Release date: 1992
- Country: India
- Language: Assamese

Firingoti is a 1992 Indian Assamese language film directed by Jahnu Barua.

== Plot ==
The story is set in 1962, during the Sino-Indian War. It revolves around Ritu, a widowed teacher, who is transferred to Koronga, a small Assamese village.

The school there was destroyed by fire ten years earlier. Ritu takes on the challenge of rebuilding the school. Ritu builds a school. It starts functioning under a huge tree.

A supposed 'son of the soil' wants to take over the school after losing his job there. When Ritu fights back against his threats and physical assault, the man brings his ruffian friends and sets fire to the school. She is comforted by the promise of the inhabitants to reconstruct the school.

== Awards ==
- National Film Award – Second Best Feature Film
- National Film Award – Best Actress : Moloya Goswami

== See also ==
- Jollywood Assamese
