= Dhiru Bhuyan =

Indian actor and director (1943–1999)

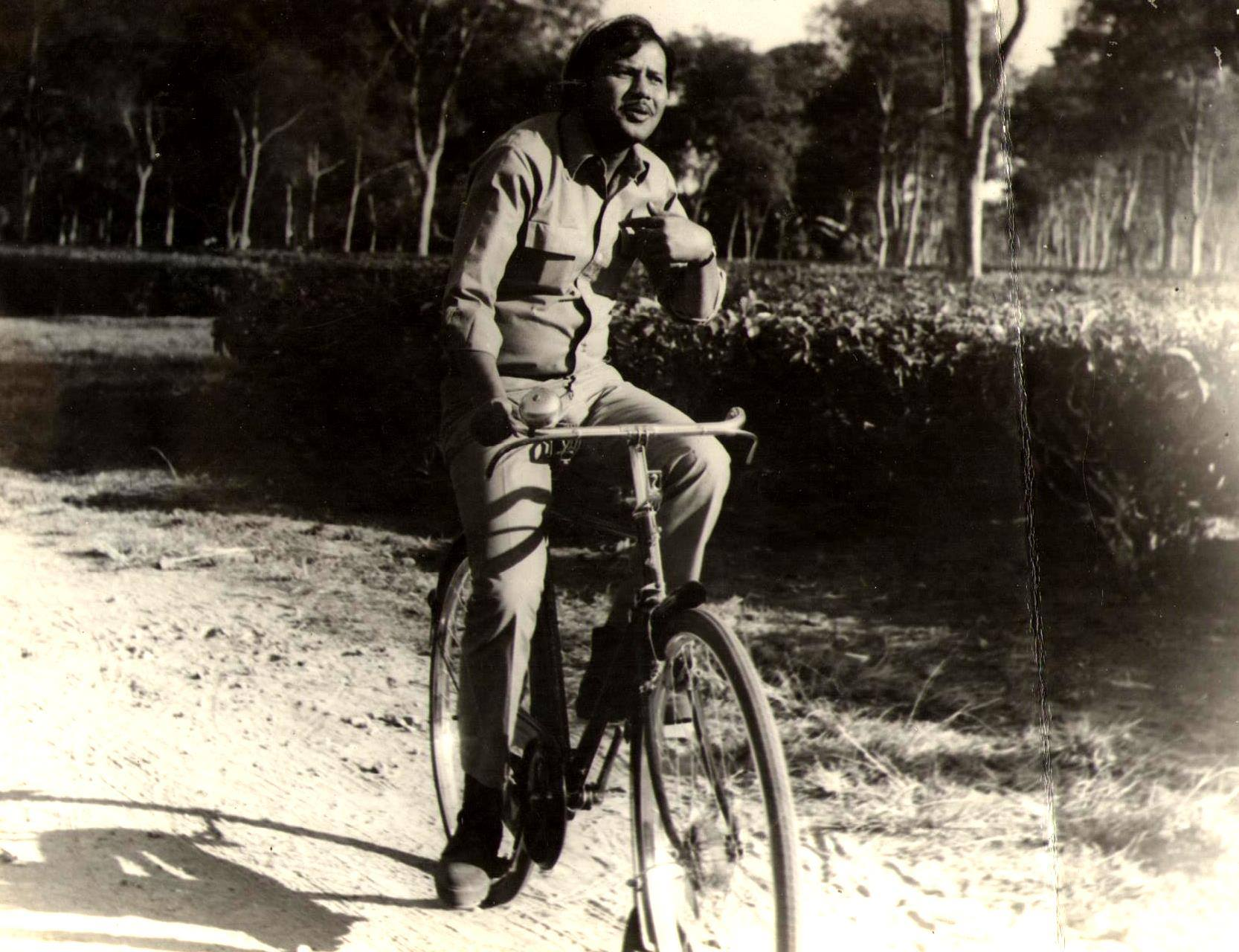
- Bhuyan in the film Ratanlal
- Born: 1943; Uzan Bazaar, Guwahati, Assam, India
- Died: 1999 (aged 55–56)
- Occupations: Actor; director; producer
- Spouse: Reeta Bhuyan
- Children: Sattyakee D'com Bhuyan (son)

Dhiru Bhuyan was an Indian theatre and film actor and director. He was born in 1943 in Uzan Bazaar, Guwahati, Assam.

== Personal life ==
Dhiru Bhuyan was born in 1943 in Bhuyan Howely, Uzan Bazar, Guwahati, Assam. He was the son of Mukhyada Kanta Bhuyan and Kamala Bhuyan.

Bhuyan was married to Reeta Bhuyan. They had two children: a son, Sattyakee D'com Bhuyan, and a daughter, Kanaki Bhuyan.

== Career ==
His film Pratham Ragini won the Rajat Kamal Award for Best Assamese Language Film at the 35th National Film Festival. Pratham Ragini was his first film to be directed. He was a Selection Grade Broadcaster with the Guwahati Station of All India Radio. His radio plays include "Phul aru kait", "Baruar Xongkhar", "Xhisa Pukhorir Maas", "Shringar Saa", "Xuronggor Xaaxot", "Brihannalar Mukti" and others.

The play "Kathphula", based on a story by Syed Abdul Malik and produced by him, was screened twice on the National Drama Program of All India Radio and broadcast in all the regional languages of the country. He was one of the founders of Progoti Shilpi Sangha in Guwahati which was established for the promotion of original Assamese plays.

== Works ==
=== Film ===
- Pratham Ragini (1988)
- Mrityunjay
- Ratanlal
- Nimmeela Angka
- Xorapat
- Lalita
- Jug Biyug
- Obhijan
- Papori
- Pratyavartan
- Sree Moti Moheemaaa Moi
- Probhati Pokhir Gaan
- Maharathi
- Dhartir Namo
- Agnisangram
- Anya Ek Sur
- Hiranyarekha

=== Plays ===
- Baruar Xongkhar
- Kathphula
- Phul aru kait
- Xhisa Pukhorir Maas
- Shringar Saa
- Xuronggor Xaaxot
- Brihannalar Mukti

== Awards ==
The film, Pratham Ragini, won the Rajat Kamal Award in the Best Assamese Language Film category at the 35th National Film Festival held in New Delhi. The ceremony took place in April 1988 and awards were given by then President of India, R. Venkataraman. The award consisted of Rs 10,000 cash along with the Rajat Kamal and was presented to the director Dhiru Bhuyan.

== Death ==
Dhiru Bhuyan died in 1999 of cancer, aged 57.
