= Ishu =

- Ishu poster
- Directed by: Utpal Borpujari
- Written by: Utpal Borpujari
- Produced by: Children's Film Society, India
- Starring: Kapil Garo, Bishnu Khargharia, Leishangthem Tonthoingambi Devi
- Release date: 2017
- Country: India
- Language: Assamese

Ishu is a 2017 Assamese language feature film written and directed by Utpal Borpujari, a film critic and former journalist. Produced by Children's Film Society, India (CFSI), the film is inspired by a novel written by Assamese writer Manikuntala Bhattacharya. Set in a remote village in Goalpara district, Ishu stars Kapil Garo as the titular character, along with Bishnu Khargharia and Tonthoingambi Leishangthem Devi. In 2018, the film was awarded the National Film Award for Best Feature Film in Assamese at the 65th National Film Awards. The film also won the Best Film title at the third Sailadhar Baruah Film Awards in Assam. It was also screened at the 1st Eikhoigi Imphal International Film Festival 2022.

== Casting ==
Kapil is a ten-year-old school going boy from a village in Assam. He was chosen by Borpujari from 300-odd children for the role. Its casts also include Bishnu Khargoria, Leishangthem Tonthoingambi Devi, and Chetana Das among others.

== Shooting ==
The film was shot in and around Rampur, a town in Kamrup rural district of Assam.

== Screening ==
The film has been screened at various film festivals across the globe. In April 2022 the film has been selected to screen at EIIFF.
