= Halodhia Choraye Baodhan Khai =

- Poster
- Directed by: Jahnu Barua
- Written by: Homen Borgohain
- Produced by: Sailadhar Baruah
- Starring: Indra Bania; Badal Das; Purnima Pathak; Pranjal Saikia; Tara; Amulya Kakati
- Cinematography: Anoop Jotwani
- Edited by: Heu-en Barua
- Music by: Satya Baruah
- Production company: Dolphin Films Pvt. Ltd
- Release date: 1987
- Running time: 120 min.
- Country: India
- Language: Assamese

Halodhia Choraye Baodhan Khai (English subtitle: The Catastrophe) is a 1987 Indian Assamese-language film made by director Jahnu Barua. It won the National Film Award for Best Feature Film in 1988 and multiple awards at the Locarno International Film Festival in 1988. It was the third full-length feature film made by Barua.

== Awards and recognitions ==
The film received the National Film Award of India for the best film in 1988. Halodhia Choraye Baodhan Khai won international awards at film festivals. It was first shown in Thiruvananthapuram. The film received several awards at the Locarno International Film Festival in 1988.

== See also ==
- Assamese Cinema
