= Xagoroloi Bohudoor =

Xagoroloi Bohu Door (It's a Long Way to the Sea)
- A screenshot
- Directed by: Jahnu Barua
- Written by: Jahnu Barua
- Produced by: Jahnu Barua; Sailadhar Baruah; Gayatri Barua
- Starring: Bishnu Kharghoria; Arun Nath; Kashmiri Saikia Baruah; Sushanta Baruah
- Cinematography: P. Ranjan
- Edited by: Heu-en Baruah
- Music by: Satya Baruah
- Distributed by: Dolphin Films Pvt. Ltd
- Release date: 1995
- Running time: 106 minutes
- Country: India
- Language: Assamese

Xagoroloi Bohu Door (English: It's a Long Way to the Sea) is a 1995 Indian Assamese language drama film directed by Jahnu Barua. The film was released in 1995.

== Plot summary ==
The story revolves around a boatman who earns his living by sailing boat in the nearby ghats. Problem arises when the government decides to construct a bridge on it which will deprive his earnings. His son who lives in city wants his father only to take care of their property.

== Cast ==
- Bishnu Kharghoria as Powal, the old man
- Arun Nath as Hemanta, Powal's son
- Kashmiri Saikia Baruah as Runumi
- Mirel Kuddus as Land agent
- Shusanta Barooah as Hkhuman, the boy
- Jayanta Bhagawati as Tarun

== Reception ==
Reviewing the film at the Indian Panorama section of the International Film Festival of India, S. R. Ashok Kumar of The Hindu praised the performances of the cast, the music and the cinematography.

== Awards ==
- National Film Award for Best Feature Film in Assamese (1995)
- National Film Award for Best Direction for Jahnu Barua
- GETZ Prize( 31st Chicago International Film Festival )
- Pri Do Public Award (Best Film: Nantes Film festival, France)
