= Jahnu Barua =

Indian film director (born 1952)

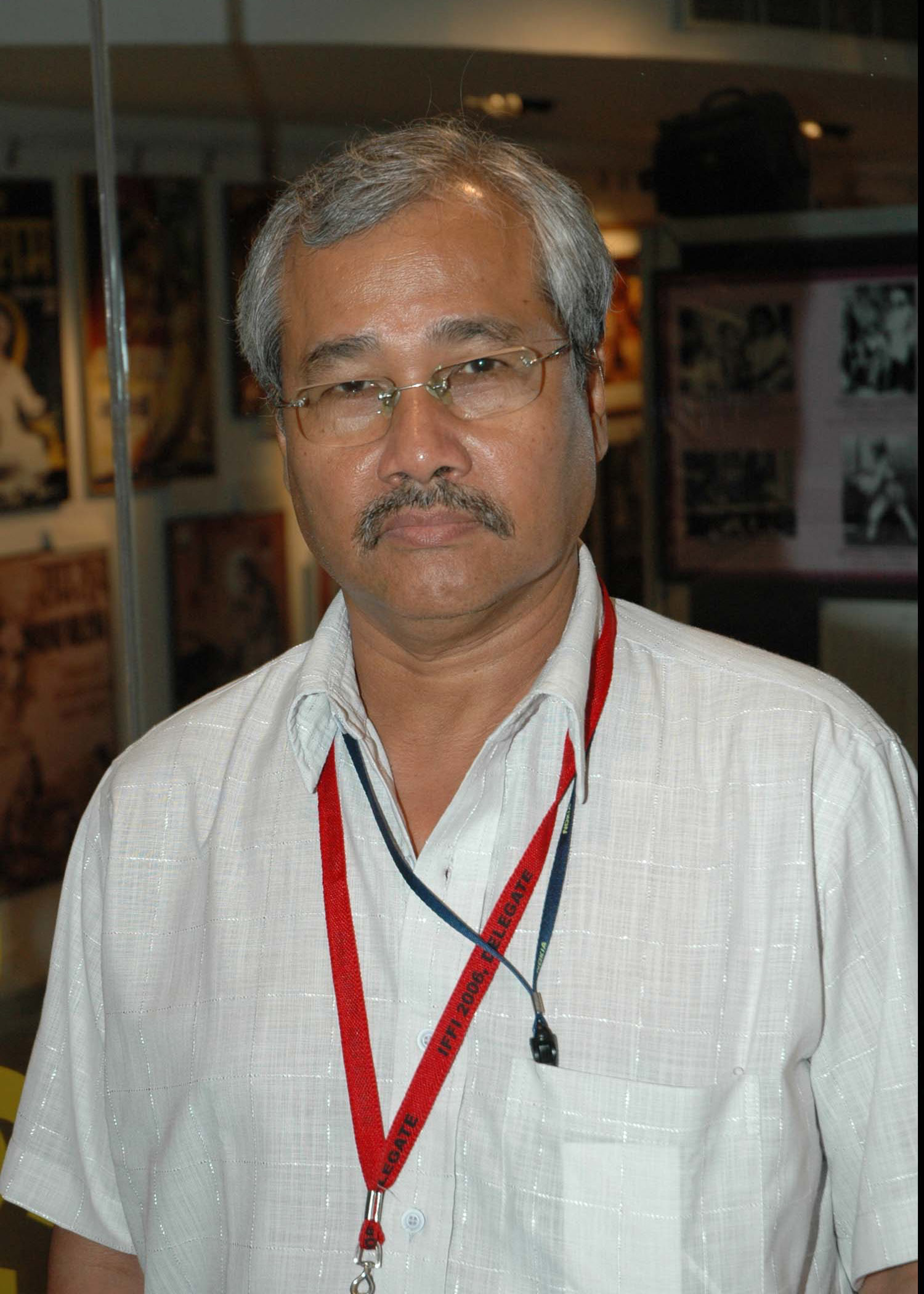
- Born: 18 October 1952 (age 73); Sivasagar, Assam, India
- Occupations: Film director, writer, producer
- Spouse: Gayatri Barua (Naumi) (m. 1989)
- Children: Ozu Barua (Actor)
- Awards: Padma Shri (2003); Padma Bhushan (2015)

Jahnu Barua (born 1952) is an Indian film director. He has written and directed a number of Assamese and Hindi films. Some of his notable films are Halodhia Choraye Baodhan Khai (1987), Firingoti (1992), Xagoroloi Bohu Door (1995), Maine Gandhi Ko Nahi Mara (2005), Konikar Ramdhenu (2003), Baandhon (2012), and Ajeyo (2014).

Jahnu Barua has been conferred Padma Shri (2003) and Padma Bhushan (2015). He served as chairman of the Indian Film Directors' Association in 1993.

== Filmography ==
Year	Title	English Title	Language	Director	Producer	Writer	Editor
1982	Aparoopa	Aparoopa	Assamese	Yes	Yes	Yes	Yes
1984	Apeksha – Hindi version of Aparoopa	Expectation	Hindi	Yes	Yes	Yes	Yes
1986	Papori		Assamese	Yes	Yes	Yes	Yes
1987	Halodhia Choraye Baodhan Khai	Catastrophe	Assamese	Yes	Yes	Yes	Yes
1990	Bonani	Forest	Assamese	Yes			Yes
1992	Firingoti	Spark	Assamese	Yes	Yes	Yes	Yes
1995	Hkhagoroloi Bohu Door	It's a Long Way to the Sea	Assames	Yes	Yes	Yes	Yes
1998	Kuhkhal	Price of Freedom	Assamese	Yes	Yes	Yes	Yes
2000	Pokhi	And the River Flows	Assamese	Yes	Yes	Yes	Yes
2003	Konikar Ramdhenu	Ride on the Rainbow	Assamese	Yes	Yes	Yes	Yes
2004	Tora	Tora's Love	Assamese	Yes		Yes	Yes
2005	Maine Gandhi Ko Nahin Mara	I Did Not Kill Gandhi	Hindi	Yes		Yes	
2010	Mumbai Cutting (Anjane Dost segment)		Hindi	Yes			
2012	Baandhon	Waves of Silence	Assamese	Yes		Yes	Yes
2014	Ajeyo	Invincible	Assamese	Yes		Yes	Yes
2018	Bhoga Khirikee	Broken Window	Assamese	Yes		Yes	Yes
Under Production	Unread Pages	–	Assamese, English	Yes			

== Television ==
- Adhikar (Right, 1988)
- Ek Kahani (One Story, 1986)
- Paatal Lok (season 2) (2025) actor

== Politics ==
The newly formed Raijor Dal announced in October 2020 that Jahnu Baruah had extended his support to the party along with Assamese film actress Zerifa Wahid and lawyer Arup Borbora.

== Awards ==
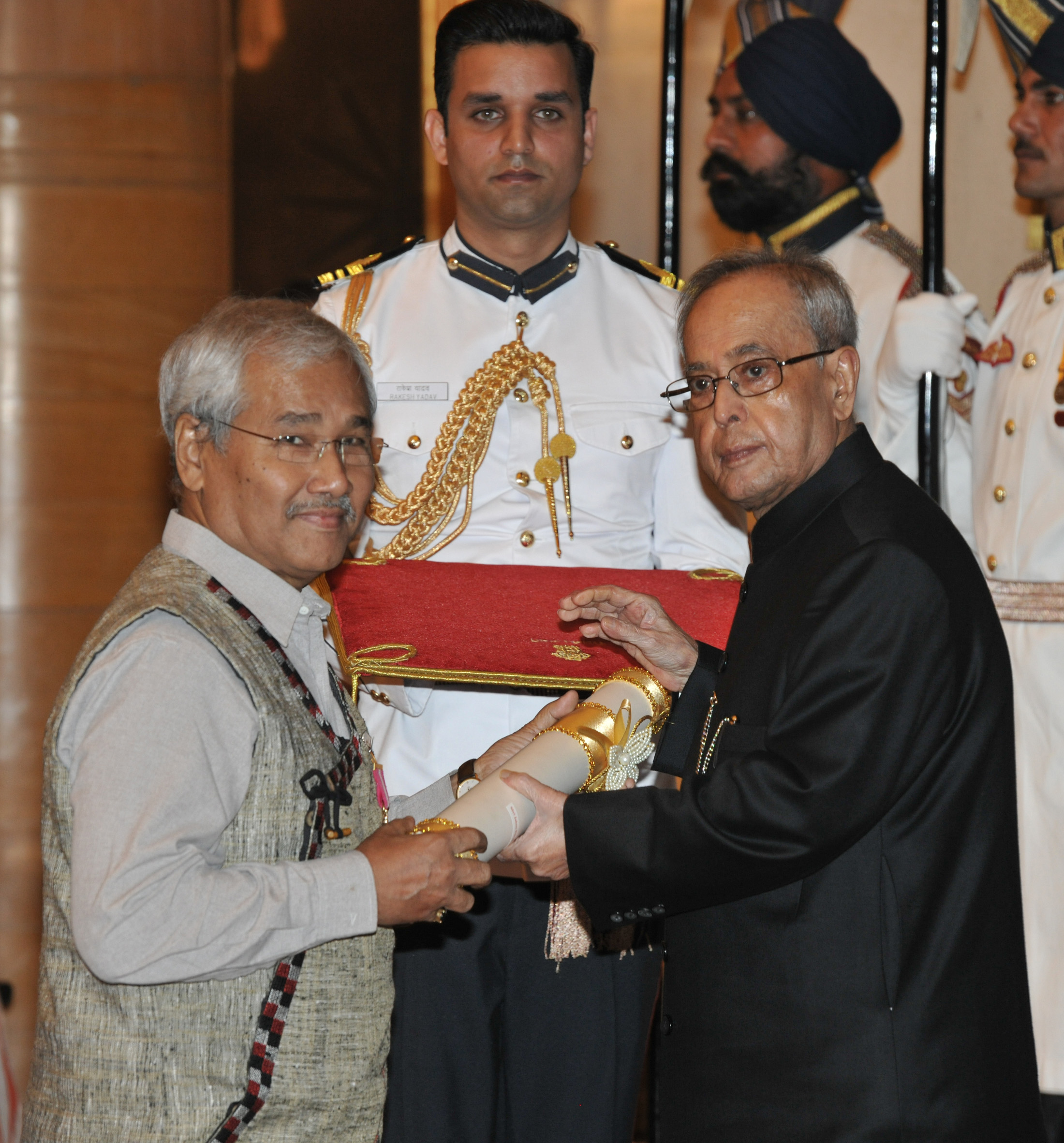

Jahnu Baruah has received the following awards:

- Padma Shri in 2003
- Padma Bhushan in 2015

=== National Film Awards ===
- 2013: Best Feature Film in Assamese: Ajeyo
- 2012: Best Feature Film in Assamese: Baandhon
- 2003: Best Regional Film for Konikar Ramdhenu
- 2003: National Film Award for Best Children's Film for Tora
- 1999: Best Regional Film for Pokhi
- 1998: Best Regional Film for Kuhkhal
- 1995: Best Director for Hkhagoroloi Bohu Door
- 1995: Best Regional Film for Hkhagoroloi Bohu Door
- 1992: Second Best Feature Film for Firingoti
- 1990: Best film on Environment for Bonani
- 1987: Best Film for Halodhia Choraye Baodhan Khai
- 1983: Best Regional Film for Aparoopa

=== Chicago International Film Festival ===
- 2005: Getz World Peace Prize for Hkhagoroloi Bohu Door

=== Brussels International Independent Film Festival ===
- 1996: Best Director for Hkhagoroloi Bohu Door

=== Fukuoka International Film Festival ===
- 2006 Kodak Vision Award for Maine Gandhi Ko Nahin Mara

=== Fribourg International Film Festival ===
- 1996: Audience Award for Hkhagoroloi Bohu Door
- 1996: Award of the Pestalozzi Children's Village Foundation for Hkhagoroloi Bohu Door

=== Locarno International Film Festival ===
- 1988: Prize of the Ecumenical Jury – Special Mention for Halodhia Choraye Baodhan Khai
- 1988: Silver Leopard for Halodhia Choraye Baodhan Khai

=== Singapore International Film Festival ===
- 1996: International Fipresci Award for Hkhagoroloi Bohu Door

=== Mumbai International Film Festival ===
- 2005: International Fipresci Award for Maine Gandhi Ko Nahin Mara

=== Sarhad (NGO) ===
- 2012: 1st Bhupen Hazarika National award

== See also ==
- Assamese cinema
- List of Assamese films before 2000
