= List of Assamese films of the 2010s =

A list of films produced by the film industry of Assam based in Guwahati, India and publicly released in the decade of the 2010s. Premiere shows and film festival screenings are not considered as releases for this list.

== 2010–2013 ==
Release date	Title	Director	Cast	Genre	Ref.
2010
15 January	Basundhara	Hiren Bora	Barsharani Bishaya, Saurabh Hazarika, Iftekar Ahmed, Bishnu Khargharia, Prithviraj Rabha, Mahika Sharma, Bhagawat Pritam	Drama	
10 March	Srimanta Sankardeva	Surjya Hazarika	Dilip Kumar Baruah, Pulak Sabha Pandit, Moloya Goswami, Arindom Bora, Aditya Sankar Hazarika, Prithiviraj Rabha, Guna Mahanta	Biopic	
17 December	Ochin Chinaki	Munna Ahmed	Aroop Bora, Ananya Pachani, Arup Baishya, Rimpi Das	Drama	
2011
4 February	Raamdhenu	Munin Barua	Jatin Bora, Prastuti Parashar, Utpal Das, Nishita Goswami, Bishnu Kharghoria, Tapan Das, Bidyut Chakrabarty	Romantic drama	
15 April	Jaanmoni	Rajesh Bhuyan	Jatin Bora, Shyamontika Sharma, Utpal Das, Saurabh Hazarika, Moonmi Gogoi, Arun Hazarika	Romantic drama	
20 May	Poley Poley Ure Mon	Timothy Das Hanse	Nipon Goswami, Barsharani Bishaya, Ravi Sarma, Rimpi Das, Tarun Arora, Raza Murad, Moloya Goswami	Drama	
19 August	Jetuka Pator Dore	Jadumoni Dutta	Aimee Barua, Raag Ainitam, Bishnu Khargharia, Arun Hazarika, Kapil Bora, Biki, Jayanta Bhagabati	Drama	
23 September	A Weekend	Diganta Mazumdar	Jayanta Bhagawati, Madhusmita Saikia, Debojit Mazumdar, Akid Zaman, Diganta Hazarika, Madhusmita Borkotoki, Padmaraag Goswami	Thriller	
14 October	Tomar Khabar	Rajiv Bora	Barsharani Bishaya, Raag Ainitam, Biki, Nikumoni Baruah, Debojit Mazumdar, Padmaraag Goswami	Drama	
2012
13 January	Jangfai Jonak	Sanjib Sabhapandit	Jitumoni Deka, Bina Patanggia, Ramesh Gupta, Lakhi Borthakur, Pranjal Saikia, Indra Baniya, Hiranya Deka	Drama	
2 March	Bakor Putek	Chandra Mudoi	Akashdeep, Angoorlata, Raag Ainitam, Amal Barua, Manika Das	Horror drama	
30 March	Samiran Barua Ahi Ase	Prodyut Kumar Deka	Tapan Das, Brojen Bora, Sanjiv Hazarika, Mrinal Das, Madhusmita Borkotoky, Baharul Islam	Political drama	
13 April	Tula aru Teja	Junmoni Devi Khaund	Vidya Rao, Arun Nath, Geetawali Rajkumari, Barnali Puzari, Manita Kakoty, Bhranti Medhi, Saurabh Hazarika, Jonak	Fantasy	(Note: Sarmah, Chandan. "'Tula Aru Teja': Folktale comes alive on celluloid". Seven Sisters Post.)
11 May	Rishang	Manas Barua	Diganta Hazarika, Nishita Goswami, Bidyut Chakravarty, Padmaraag Goswami, Ranjeev Lal Barua, Pakeeza Begum	Romance action	(Note: "A son rises to direct Rishang (sunshine) - Manas Barua debuts as director". The Telegraph. 11 May 2012.)
14 September	Ekhon Nedekha Nodir Xhipare	Bidyut Kotoky	Sanjay Suri, Bidita Bag, Victor Banerjee, Nakul Vaid, Raj Zutshi, Naved Aslam, Preeti Jhangiani	Socio-political thriller	
5 October	Rowd	Gautam Baruah	Utpal Das, Diganta Hazarika, Moonmi Phukan, Monali Bordoloi, Bhagawat Pritam, Jayanta Bhagawati, Padmaraag Goswami, Hiranya Deka	Romantic drama	
26 October	Baandhon	Jahnu Barua	Bishnu Kharghoria, Bina Patangia, Jatin Bora, Zerifa Wahid, Abatush Bhuyan, Angshuman Bhuyan	Drama	
2 November	Borolar Ghor	Mani C. Kappan	Utpal Das, Debasmita Benarjee, Nipon Goswami, Purnima Pathak Saikia, Mani C. Kappan, Sreelekha Mukherji, Bishnu Kharghoria	Romantic comedy	
2 November	Me & My Sister	Rajesh Bhuyan	Barsharani Bishaya, Prastuti Parashar, Saurabh Hazarika, Gyanendra Pallab, Dishan Dholua, Birina	Drama	
2013
4 January	Dwaar	Bidyut Chakravarty	Kapil Bora, Zerifa Wahid, Tanvi Sharma, Mintu Baruah, Mahika Sharma, Bulganin Baruah, Srijani Bhaswa Mahanta, Asha Bordoloi	Drama	
1 March	Luitok Bhetibo Kune	Prabin Bora	Dinesh Das, Prabin Bora, Biplab Bora, Dr. Gunin Basumatary, Padum Gogoi, Aparajita Dutta, Rita Bora, Abhijit Mazumdar	Drama	
15 March	Mone Mur Kaina Bisare	Sadananda Gogoi	Neil Das, Bhargav Das, Nishita Goswami, Aimee Barua	Romance	
19 April	Ranangan	Pranabjyoti Bharali	Ravi Sarma, Pallavi Medhi, Jintu Sarma, Manas, Saju, Pratul Deka, Apurba Deka, Deep Deori, Dhanasmita	Action	
26 April	Aakash Chuboloi Mon	Manash Hazarika	Jayanta Das, Hironya Deka, Bhargav Kotoky, Jaffi Bakshi, Neil Das, Sasanka Samir, Rina Bora, Lipika Bora Medhi	Drama	
17 May	Surjasta	Prodyut Kumar Deka	Tapan Das, Mridul Chutia, Angoorlata, Queen Hazarika, Rodali, Himangshu Das, Kulada Kumar Bhattacharjee	Drama	
24 May	Adhyay	Arup Manna	Pabitra Rabha, Tarulata Kutum, Saponti Bordoloi, Dolan Bora	Drama	
14 June	Tumi Jodi Kuwa	Simple Gogoi	Prasenjit Borah, Jupitora Bhuyan, Munmi Kalita, Rupam Sharma, Prince, Mahika Sharma, Bhaskar Ranjan, Ranjan Dutta, Krishna	Romantic Musical Drama	
26 July	Bir Chilarai	Samarendra Narayan Dev	Anup Hazarika, Bishnu Kharghoria, Bhagawat Pritom, Aimee Baruah, Mridula Baruah	Biopic	
23 August	Momtaaj	Pulok Gogoi	Bhargav Das, Ananya Parashar, Abdul Mazid, Jayanta Das, Hiranya Deka, Upakul Bordoloi, Moni Bordoloi, Munna Ahmed, Monali Bordoloi	Drama	
20 September	Bhal Pabo Najanilu	Rhituraj Dutta	Dhyanjyoti Bora, Annanyya Kashyap, Moloya Goswami, Bidyut Chakraborty, Minu Bania, Arun Hazarika	Romantic Drama	
27 September	Local Kung Fu	Kenny Basumatary	Kenny Basumatary, Sangeeta Nair, Tony Basumatary, Utkal Hazowary	Martial arts comedy	(Note: Maniar, Parag (21 September 2013). "Indian martial arts flick gears up for release". The Times of India. TNN.)
25 October	Durjon	Moupran Sharma	Utpal Das, Ananya Parashar, Konki Bordoloi, Dr. Gunin Basumatari, Rina Bora	Comedy drama	
22 November	Mahasamar	Jones Mahalia	Nipon Goswami, Arun Hazarika, Dinesh Das, Aimee Baruah, Ratul Deka	Drama	

== 2014–2019 ==
=== 2014 ===
#	Opening	Title	Director	Cast	Genre	CBFC	Ref.
1	3 January	Ajeyo	Jahnu Barua	Rupam Chetia, Prathibha Choudhury, Jupitora Bhuyan, Bishnu Kharghoria, Kapil Bora, Munmi Kalita, Sourav Hazarika, Rimpi Das	Drama	U	
2	17 January	Shinyor	Kangkan Rajkhowa	Priyashree Kashyap, Pranami Bora, Simashree Bora, Jyanendra Pallov, Abhijeet Goswami, Bhagirothi	Drama	U/A	
3	7 February	Raag: The Rhythm of Love	Rajni Basumatary	Adil Hussain, Zerifa Wahid, Kapil Bora, Kenny Basumatary	Drama	U	
4	21 February	Hiya Diba Kak	Rajiv Bora	Jatin Bora, Angoorlata, Biju Phukan, Nipon Goswami, Abdul Mazid, Padmaraag Goswami	Romance action	U	
5	13 March	Jeeya Jurir Xubax	Sanjib Sabhapandit	Victor Banerjee, Bishnu Kharghoriya, Dibyajyoti Das, Sagarika, Raag, Arunabh	Drama	U	
6	14 March	Saya	Rohon Patar	Pabir Rajkhowa, Neelam Sharma, Karabi, Kajri, Himashree, Sabbir, Dipak Roy	Action thriller	U/A	
7	18 April	Borosi	Prodyut Kumar Deka	Toufique Rehman, Madhusmita Borkotoky, Juan Dutta	Suspense thriller	U/A	
8	9 May	Abhadra	Aman Kumar	Chiranjeet Borah, FairyPriya Ahmed, Indumouli Neog	Comedy	U/A	
9	30 May	Jilmil Jonak	Sibanan Baruah	Jatin Bora, Nishita Goswami, Raag Oinitam, Shyamontika Sharma, Podmarag Goswami, Akashdeep Deka, Trishna Kurmi	Drama	U	
10	27 June	Grahan	Tilak Sarma	Diganta Hazarika, Farhin Choudhury, Babi Baruah, Pankaj Pujari	Drama	U	
11	29 August	Mahapurush	Brajen Bora	Brajen Bora, Hadi Alam Bora, Dinesh Das, Chetana Das, Gayatri Mahanta	Drama	U	
12	12 September	Paani	Jadumoni Dutta	Bishnu Kharghoria, Aimee Barua, Himanshu Prasad Das, Asha Bordoloi, Spondon Mukul	Drama	U	
13	19 September	Suma Poroxote	Junmoni Devi Khaund	Indumouli Neog, Debasmita Benarjee	Romance action	U	
14	26 September	The Face	Rajib Dutta	Padmaraag Goswami, Rishabh Sharma, Rimi Hazarika	Action thriller	U	
15	17 October	Sringkhal	Prabin Hazarika	Adil Hussain, Jaya Seal, Saurabh Hazarika	Drama	U	
16	7 November	Rodor Sithi	Baharul Islam	Bhagirathi, Adil Hussain, Zubeen Garg, Angaraag Mahanta, FairyPriya Ahmed	Drama	U	
17	28 November	TRP Aru...	Mridul Gupta	Urmila Mahanta, Gunjan Bharadwaj, Prince Chowhan, FairyPriya Ahmed	Drama	U	
18	12 December	Adomya	Bobby Sarma Baruah	Pranami Bora, Sulakshana Baruah, Runu Devi, Pranjal Saikia	Drama	U/A	

=== 2015 ===
#	Opening	Title	Director	Cast	Genre	CBFC	Ref.
1	2 January	Ahetuk	Bani Das	Gunjan Bharadwaj, Amrita Gogoi, Tapan Das, Ashwini Bhuyan, Rajiv Kro	Action thriller	U	
2	16 January	Aarohi	Arup Manna	Chandana Sharma, Raag Oinitom, Shabnam Bargoyari	Drama	U	
3	27 March	Anuradha	Rakesh Sharma	Meghranjani Medhi, Diganta Hazarika, Joy Kashyap, Pranami Bora	Drama	U/A	
4	10 July	Love In Bangkok	Ashim Baishya	Bikul Dutta, Sangeeta Gogoi, Nandita Bora, Akashdeep	Romance action	U	
5	7 August	Car No. 0271	Swaroop Dutta	Diganta Konwar, Dorothy Bhardwaj, Rajdeep Konwar, Bishnu Khargharia	Thriller	A	
6	9 October	Jajabor	Rajib Sarma	Lakhi Borthakur, Sashanka Samir, Rijusmita Goswami	Drama	U	
7	30 October	Khel: The Game	Ashok Kumar Bishaya	Barsha Rani Bishaya, Ankur Kumar Bishaya, Jayanta Das, Nikumoni Baruah	Drama, Thriller	U/A	
8	2 November	Bokul	Reema Borah	Ankita Borah, Anupam Borah, Nirab Das	Drama	U	
9	11 December	Khawoi: The Danger Zone	Umesh Ghosh	Anamika Barman, Indumouli Neog, Md. Ali, Karabi Sharma	Thriller	U	

=== 2016 ===
#	Opening	Title	Director	Cast	Genre	CBFC	Ref.
1	19 February	Tomar Premot Pori	Boon Bora	Akashdeep, Dibyajyoti Das, Nayan Nirban Baruah, FairyPriya Ahmed	Romance, Drama	U/A	
2	11 March	Love in Tawang	Dipak Nath	Dhruv, Spainy, Arun Nath, Atul Pachani, Subhash Modak	Romance	U/A	
3	29 April	Borhxaranya	Diganta Mazumdar	Tapan Das, Arun Nath, Debojit Mazumdar, Tonthoi Devi	Drama, Thriller	U	
4	13 May	Lokabandhoo	Dhiraj Kashyap	Pranjal Saikia, Suren Bora, Nishita Goswami, Vaishali Saikia	Biopic	U	
5	10 June	Pratyahban	Nipon Dholua	Baharul Islam, Trisha Khan, Dishan Dholua, Bhagawat Pritam	Drama	U/A	
6	17 June	Cactus	Arup Manna	Jahanara Begum, Ashok Singh, Kulada Kumar Bhattacharya, Simi Ryan	Drama	U/A	
7	5 August	Morisika	Nipon Dholua	Kopil Bora, Nipon Goswami, Indra Bania, Munmi kalita	Socio-Political	U	
8	2 September	Doordarshan Eti Jantra	Rajesh Bhuyan	Jatin Bora, Utpal Das, Prastuti Parashar, Munmi Phukan, Chetana Das	Satire	U	
9	9 September	Saat Nomboror Sandhanat	Abdul Majid	Zubeen Garg, Raag Oinitom, Mitali Roy, Sohidul Mazid	Drama	U	
10	16 September	Kothanodi	Bhaskar Hazarika	Seema Biswas, Adil Hussain, Zerifa Wahid, Urmila Mahanta, Kopil Bora, Asha Bordoloi	Fantasy, Drama	U	
11	30 September	Dikchow Banat Palaax	Sanjb Sabhapandit	Kulada Kumar Bhattacharya, Aren Zamir, Mala Goswami, Mina Ingti	Drama	U	
12	14 October	Gaane Ki Aane	Rajesh Jashpal	Zubeen Garg, Parineeta Borthakur, Nipon Goswami, Rimpi Das	Musical drama	U/A	
13	21 October	Hari Om	Arup Jyoti Rabha	Bhaskar Ranjan Nath, Trishna Kurmi, Debashree Gogoi, Prince, Syon Hazarika	Action	U	
14	4 November	Paglee	Rupjyoti Bora	Prastuti Parashar, Nayan Nirban Baruah, Dhrubajyoti Das	Action	U	
15	11 November	Sarvagunakar Srimanta Sankardeva	Manju Borah	-	Animation, Biopic	U	
16	2 December	Bahniman	Biswajeet Bora	Yashpal Sharma, Jatin Bora, Ravi Janghu, Rimi Hazarika	Action drama	U	
17	16 December	Zero : The Value of Life	Ashim Baishya		Drama	U	

=== 2017 ===
#	Opening	Title	Director	Cast	Genre	CBFC	Ref.
1	6 January	Konwarpurar Konwar	Rajesh Bhuyan	Nayan Nilim, Tapashree Kalita, Utpal Das, Amrita Gogoi	Romance, Action	U	
2	13 January	Dur	Kangkan Rajkhowa	Udayan Duwara, Amrita Gogoi, Achinta Shankar	Romance, Drama	U	
3	20 January	Shakira Ahibo Bokultolor Bihuloi	Himanshu Prasad Das	Himanshu Prasad Das, Pranami Bora, Akhim Krishna Barua, Sidhartha Mukharjee, Jyoti Narayan Nath, Chandan Das, Apurba Barman	Drama	U	
4	17 February	Beautiful Lives	Kangkan Deka	Boloram Das, Ashrumoni Bora, Pakeeza Begum	Drama	A	
5	3 March	Mriganabhi	Heman Das	Prastuti Parashar, Nipon Goswami, Rajib Goswami	Drama	U	
6	24 March	Ruff and Tuff	Mani Sinha	Gunjan Bhardwaj, Gargi Kristi	Romance, Action	U	
7	31 March	Othello	Hemanta Kumar Das	Arup Baishya, Jupitora Bhuyan, Arun Nath	Drama	U	
8	19 April	Local Kung Fu 2	Kenny Basumatary	Utkal Hazowary, Kenny Basumatary, Eepsita Hazarika, Sarmistha Chakravarty, Bibhuti Bhushan Hazarika	Comedy, Kung fu film	U	
9	5 May	Antareen	Monjul Baruah	Urmila Mahanta, Arun Nath, Boloram Das, Debabrata Borthakur, Mayukh Sarma, Himangshu Das	Drama	U	
10	19 May	Soi Gaaor Chompa	Chandra Mudoi	Amrita Gogoi, Joy Bhattacharya, Paulomi Banerjee, Biswajit Chakraborty	Comedy drama	U	
11	9 June	Chaaknoiya	Nava Kumar Nath	Dhananjay Devnath, Pranami Bora, Himangshu Prasad Das	Drama	U	
12	16 June	Sesh Angikar	Pranay Phukan	Nipon Goswami, Jayanta Bhagowati, Reba Phukan, Nayan Nilim, Paul Phukan	Drama	U	
13	7 July	Dooronir Nirola Poja	Dhruv J Bordoloi	Mintu Deka, Jayashree Goswami	Drama	U	
14	28 July	Ajanite	Dimbeswar Gogoi	Prabir Rajkhowa, Sushmita Kanilandi	Romance, Drama	U	
15	8 September	Mission China	Zubeen Garg	Zubeen Garg, Diplina Deka, Sattyakee D'com Bhuyan	Thriller	U/A	
16	22 September	Tumi Aahibane	Prerana Barbarooah	Ravi Sarma, Barsha Rani Bishaya, Gunjan Bhardwaj, Moonmi Phukan	Romance, Drama	U	
17	29 September	Khobh	Hiren Bora	Bishnu Khargharia, Nipon Goswami, Nishita Goswami, Aparna Datta Choudhury, Rita Bora	Drama	U	
18	6 October	Aei Maatite	Sitanath Lahkar	Sitanath Lahkar, Amarjyoti Choudhury, Monisha Goswami, Rupam Chetia, Meena Ingti, Sasanka Samir	Drama	U/A	
19	27 October	Maj Rati Keteki	Santwana Bardoloi	Adil Hussain, Shakil Imtiaz, Mahendra Rabha, Sulakshana Baruah	Drama	U	
20	3 November	The Curiosity Shop	Sankar Baruah	Upamanyu Bora, Anupjyoti Chowdhury, Bidisha Kashyap, Anupam Bora, Debashmita Borgohain	Drama	U	
21	10 November	Priyaar Priyo	Munin Barua	Zubeen Garg, Aradhana Buragohain, Gunjan Bhardwaj, Sunita Kaushik	Romantic comedy	U	
22	24 November	Rum Vodka Whisky	Prashant Saikia	Hiranya Das, Queen Hazarika, Udayan Duarah, Priyanka Bhargab, Moon Rajiv, Durgashri Bora	Drama	U/A	
23	24 November	Sonar Baran Pakhi	Bobby Sarma Barua	Pranami Bora, Pranjal Saikia, Arati Borua, Kamalpriyo Das, Jagdish Deka, Sushmita Roy	Drama	U	
24	15 December	Khalnayika	Hemanta Nilim Das	Fairypriya Ahmed, Gagan Sharma, Jayanta Negi, Alok Sharma	Drama, Thriller		

=== 2018 ===
#	Opening	Title	Director	Cast	Genre	CBFC	Ref.
1	5 January	Hosa Prem	Pramod S.	Brojen Bora, Kalpa Jyoti Gogoi, Tapashree Kalita, Rajiv Kro, Sangina Brahma, Rahul Das, Rupam Boruah, Manash Sarma, Shyamolima Deka	Romantic comedy	U	
2	5 January	Amazon Adventure (Note: Amazon Obhijaan is originally Bengali film. it is also released on Assamese, Odia, Telugu, Tamil and English language)	Kamaleshwar Mukherjee	Dev, Laboni Sarkar, Tamal Ray Chowdhury, David James, Svetlana Gulakova, Eduardo Munniz	Action adventure	U/A	
3	19 January	Xhoixhobote Dhemalite	Bidyut Kotoky	Victor Banerjee, Dipannita Sharma, Nakul Vaid, Naved Aslam, Nipon Goswami, Nikumoni Barua	Drama	U/A	
4	16 February	Calendar	Himjyoti Talukdar	Moloya Goswami, Arun Nath, Gunjan Bhardwaj, Rimjhim Deka	Drama	U	
5	23 February	Dhou	Laxminandan Pegu	Nibedita Yein, Lakhinandan Pegu, Biki, Mridusmita Gogoi, Mridul Baruah	Romance, Action	U/A	
6	2 March	Marksheet	Ratan Sil Sarma	Aditya Malla Bezarbarua, AbhijeetChoudhury, Pranami Bora, Jintu Kalita, Dibyajyoti Kalita	Drama	U	
7	9 March	Ajanite Mone Mone	Upakul Bordoloi	Pranjal Saikia, Baharul Islam, Raag Oinitom, Sunita Kaushik	Drama	U	
8	16 March	Nijanor Gaan	Munna Ahmed	Jatin Bora, Aimee Baruah, Amrita Gogoi, Anannya, Biki	Romance, Drama	U	
9	23 March	Xondhikhyon	M Maniram	Saurabh Hazarika, Dorsana Bora, Satyen Sarma	Drama	U	
10	11 May	Raktabeez	Biswajeet Bora	Ravi Janghu, Barsha Rani Bishaya, Lonishri Das, Suren Mahanta, Baharul Islam, Suneet Bora	Thriller, Romance	U/A	
11	18 May	Tandab of Pandab	Priyam Nirmal	Jayanta Das, Jayanta Bhagwati, Biki, Hiranya Deka, Barsha Rani Bishaya	Comedy	U	
12	13 July	Krodh: The Devil Inside	Manoj Baishya	Udayan Duarah, Debasmita Banerjee, Paran Kamal, Pankaj Kr. Das, Vivek Anand	Drama, Thriller	U/A	
13	27 July	Tur Mur Phokotia Love Story	Indrajit Kakati	Nimi Kashyap, Barbie Kashyap, Dolly Bordoloi, Manash Gogoi, Suprabhat Gope, Aryan Kalita, Indrajit Kakati	Romance, Comedy	U/A	
14	3 August	Dham Dhama Dham	Mani Sinha	Rupam Chakrabarty, Kalpana Kalita, Arun Hazarika, Rajib Borthakur, Bankim Rabha	Action, Comedy, Romance	U	
15	31 August	Lilar Pora Leilaloi	Sarbananda Gogoi	Antarikh Saharia, Sarmistha Chakravorty, Enikha Sarma	Drama, Thriller	U/A	
16	21 September	Tumi Muk Faki Dila	Hadif Ahmed	Gunjan Bhardwaj, Kalpana Kalita, Arun Nath, Lipika Bora Medhi, Padmarag Goswami	Romance, Action	U/A	
17	21 September	III Smoking Barrels (Note: III Smoking Barrels is a multilingual film, including languages Assamese, English, Hindi, Bengali, Nagamese, and Manipuri)	Sanjib Dey	Subrat Dutta, Indraneil Sengupta, Amrita Chattopadhyay, Mandakini Goswami, Siddharth Boro, Shiny Gogoi, Nalneesh Neel, Bijou Thaangjam, Vikram Gogoi, Niloy Shankar Gupta	Drama	A	
18	28 September	Village Rockstars	Rima Das	Bhanita Das, Basanti Das, Boloram Das, Bishnu Kalita	Coming of age drama	U	
19	5 October	The Underworld	Rajesh Jashpal	Zubeen Garg, Parineeta Borthakur, Biju Phukan, Probin Borthakur, Utpal Das, Diganta Hazarika, Nipon Goswami, Baharul Islam, Lipika Borah	Thriller	U	
20	26 October	Raja Returns	Kishor Das	Bhargav Das, Fairy Priya Ahmed, Sagarika Goswami, Bijit Devachoudhury, Manas Sharma	Comedy	U	
21	23 November	Ahi Ase ( Coming Soon ) .....	Nipon Dholua	Rajkumar Thakuria, Monmoth Baruah, Raj Protim Baruah, Gitali Bahoi, Debasmita Benarjee	Comedy	U	
22	7 December	Suspended Inspector Boro	Kenny Basumatary	Utkal Hazowari, Kenny Basumatary, Punam Gurung, Ipsita Hazarika	Action	U	

=== 2019 ===
#	Opening	Title	Director	Cast	CBFC	Ref.
1	4 January	Bhaworiya	Biswajit Kalita	Bishnu Kharoghoria, Nipon Goswami, Atul Pachoni, Hiranya Das, Birubala Rabha	U	
2	1 March	Kokaideu Bindaas	Dhruva J. Bordoloi	Gunjan Bhardwaj, Alishmita Goswami, Monuj Borkotoky, Junu Nath, Suren Mahanta, Jayanta Das, Mintu Baruah, Pratibha Choudhry, Nikumoni Baruah	U	
3	15 March	Rongeen	Shankar Borua	Kussum Koilash, Upamanyu Boruwa, Hiren Sarma, Ranjit Baruah, Shruti Kashayap	U	
4	22 March	Kaaneen	Monjul Baruah	Jahanara Begum, Baharul Islam, Partha Hazarika, Purnima Saikia, Dhananjay Debnath	U	
5	29 March	Seema - The Untold Story	Hiren Bora	George Baker, Nipon Goswami, Arun Nath, Jahanara Begum	U	
6	3 May	Bornodi Bhotiai	Anupam Kaushik Borah	Comedy, Romance	U	
7	6 September	Kanchanjangha	Zubeen Garg	Zubeen Garg, Pinki Sharma, Pabitra Rabha, Sasanka Samir, Dhritiman Phukan	U/A	
8	20 September	Bulbul Can Sing	Rima Das	Arnali Das, Bonita Thakuriya, Manoranjoan Das, Manabendra Das, Pakija Begam	U	
9	11 October	Ratnakar	Jatin Bora	Action, Romance	U	
10	1 November	Rowd Hoy Aha Tumi	Topon Bordoloi	Manali Bordoloi, Shiddhant Kalita, Jayanta Das, Moloya Goswami, Manmath Baruah, Bhagavat pritam, Sharmista Chakrabarti, Nitul Sharma, John Daflaree	U	
11	8 November	Astittwa	Mirza Arif Hazarika	Bibhuti Bhushan Hazarika, Dinesh Das, Brojen Bora, Siddhartha Mukherjee, Lonishri Das, Durgashri Bora, Manuj Gogoi	U	
12	15 November	Epaar Xipaar	Pranabjyoti Bharali	Udayan Duarah, Amrita Gogoi, Pol Phukan, Rupjyoti, Kashmiri Saikia, Pranab Dutta	U	
13	22 November	Aamis	Bhaskar Hazarika	Lima Das, Arghadeep Barua, Neetali Das, Sagar Saurabh, Manash K Das	U/A	
14	6 December	Pratighaat	Achinta Shankar	Diganta Hazarika, Amrita Gogoi, Hiranya Deka, Bishnu Kharghoria, Shidhartha Sharma, Ashramika Saikia, Aimee Baruah	U	

== Other ==
=== Notable deaths ===
Date	Name	Age	Profession	Notable films	Ref.
12 June 2014	Khagen Mahanta	72	Musician		
17 July 2014	Pramod Baruah	78	Director, producer, actor	Abhijan, Anutap, Upapath, Pratidan	
15 February 2015	Kanaklata Hazarika	76	Actor	Runumi	
17 February 2015	Ashraful Haque	46	Actor		
28 February 2015	Achyut Bhagawati	45	Director	Mitha Mitha Laganat, Borolar Sangsar	
25 March 2015	Indra Bania	73	Actor	Halodhia Choraye Baodhan Khai, Agnisnaan, Haldhar, Aai Kot Naai	
15 April 2015	Bidyut Chakravarty	55	Director, Actor	Rag Birag, Goon Goon Gaane Gaane, Anuraag, Dwaar, Nikhiddho Nadi, Raamdhenu	

=== Events / Award ceremonies ===
Date	Event	Host	Location	Source
22 March 2014	Prag Cine Awards 2014	Prag AM Television Pvt. Ltd., Assam Society of Bangalore	Koramangala Indoor Stadium, Bangalore, India	
29 March 2014	1st Filmfare Awards East	Filmfare	Science City auditorium, Kolkata, India	
21–22 March 2015	Prag Cine Awards North-East 2015	Prag AM Television Pvt. Ltd.	Chowkidingee field, Dibrugarh, India	
17 October 2015	6th State Film Award Festival	State Directorate of Cultural Affairs, Assam State Film (Finance and Development) Corporation, Jyoti Chitraban Film Studio Society	ITA Centre for Performing Arts, Guwahati, India	

=== Non-theatrical releases ===
#	Premiere	Title	Director	Cast	Genre	CBFC	Platform	Ref.
1	26 January 2016	North Bank	Manas Saikia	Mridul Baruah, Hiranya Das, Pakeeza Begum, Haren Saikia, Mayuri Borkakoty	Drama	U	Television	
2	8 May 2016	Dristi	Prodyut Kumar Deka	Priyanka Bhargav, Nayan Saikia, Lonishree Das, Chetana Das	Drama	-	Television	
3	28 June 2016	Marksheet	Ratan Sil Sarma	Pranami Bora, Jintu Kalita, Aditya Malla Buzarbarua, Abhijit Choudhury, Dibyajyoti Saikia	Drama	U	Online	
4	1 September 2016	Dooronir Nirola Poja	Dhruva J Bordoloi	Mintu Baruah, Jayshree Goswami, Bibhuti Bhushan Hazarika, Partha Hazarika, Raghavi Dutta	Drama	U	Online	
