= Prag Cine Awards 2014 =

- Official poster of the event
- Date: 22 March 2014
- Site: Koramangala Indoor Stadium, Bangalore, India
- Hosted by: Kopil Bora; Zerifa Wahid
- Organized by: Prag AM Television Pvt. Ltd. Assam Society of Bangalore

Highlights
- Best Film: Ajeyo
- Best Direction: Jadumoni Dutta; Paani
- Best Actor: Adil Hussain; Raag: The Rhythm of Love
- Best Actress: Jaya Seal Ghose; Sringkhal
- Most awards: Shinyor (6)
- Most nominations: Raag: The Rhythm of Love (12)

The Prag Cine Awards 2014 ceremony, presented by the Prag Network, honored the actors, technical achievements, and films censored in 2013 from Assam and took place on 22 March 2014, at the Koramangala Indoor Stadium in Bangalore, India. Actors duos Kopil Bora and Zerifa Wahid hosted the show. Veteran litterateur Arun Sharma, Kannada film director Nagathihalli Chandrashekhar and Bollywood film actress Mahima Chaudhary inaugurated the event.

Actor Mridula Barua was honoured with the lifetime Achievement Award for her contribution towards the Assamese film Industry. Actor Adil Hussain received best actor award for Raag and the best actress award has gone to Jaya Seal Ghose for Sringkhal. Jahnu Barua directed Ajeyo won the best film award.

== Winners and nominees ==
The nominees for the Prag Cine Awards 2014 were announced on 3 March 2014. In this edition, awards are given in 23 categories to the Assamese and non-Assamese films produced from Assam and censored in the year of 2013. Raag topped the nomination list with twelve nominations, followed by Ajeyo and Shinyor tied for the second place with eleven each.

=== Awards ===
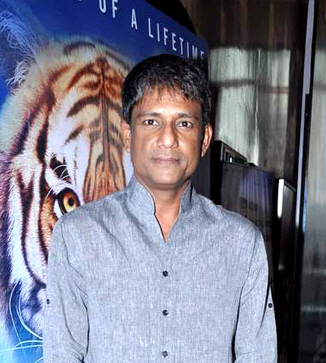
Adil Hussain, Best Actor winner

Winners are listed first and highlighted in boldface.

Best Film	Best Director
**Ajeyo**; Raag; Shinyor	**Jadumoni Dutta – Paani**; Rajni Basumatary – Raag; Kangkan Rajkhowa – Shinyor
Best Actor Male	Best Actor Female
**Adil Hussain – Raag**; Rupam Chetia – Ajeyo; Bhargav Das – Momtaaj	**Jaya Seal Ghose – Sringkhal**; Zerifa Wahid – Raag; Jupitora Bhuyan – Ajeyo
Best Supporting Actor Male	Best Supporting Actor Female
**Badal Das – Sringkhal**; Kenny Basumatary – Raag; Debananda Saikia – Paani	**Pranami Bora – Shinyor**; Pratibha Choudhury – Ajeyo; Kangki Bordoloi – Durjon
Best Music Direction	Best Lyrics
**Anurag Saikia – Shinyor**; Avinash Baghel – Raag; Dhrubajyoti Phukan – Ajeyo	**Ibson Lal Baruah – Shinyor**; Ashurjya Barpatra and Amrit Jyoti Gohain – Bhal Pabo Najanilu; Sarat Barkakati – Raag
Best Playback Singer Male	Best Playback Singer Female
**Rupam Bhuyan – Momtaaj**; Zubeen Garg – Shinyor; Angaraag Mahanta – Bhal Pabo Najanilu	**Madhusmita Borthakur – Shinyor**; Anindita Paul – Raag; Kalpana Patowary – Ranangan
Best Cinematography	Best Film Editing
**Pradip Daimary – Shinyor**; Siddhartha Baruah – Sringkhal; Sumon Dowerah – Ajeyo	**Kangkan Rajkhowa – Shinyor**; Rupam Kalita – Paani; Hue-en Barua – Ajeyo
Best Screenplay	Best Choreography
**Jadumoni Dutta** and **Dipak Kumar Gogoi – Paani**; Rajni Basumatary – Raag; Prabin Hazarika – Sringkhal	**Deepak Dey – Durjon**; Bappa Ahmed – Momtaaj; Uday Shankar – Tumi Jodi Kuwa
Best Sound Design	Best Art Direction
**Dipak Dutta – Durjon**; Jatin Sharma – Ajeyo; Bhaskar Sharma – Shinyor	**Deepti Chawla** and **Archana Malhotra – Raag**; Phatik Barua – Ajeyo; Phatik Barua – Sringkhal
Best Makeup	Best Costume Design
**Akash Gogoi – Raag**; Asitabh Baruah – Ajeyo; Asitabh Baruah – Sringkhal	**Geetarani Goswami – Ajeyo**; Deepti Chawla and Subhalakshmi Benarjee – Raag; Rumi – Shinyor
Best Popular Film	Best Film other than Assamese
**Momtaaj**	**Karma Ke Rati – Sadri**; Pachinaker Gangajal – Sadri

== Lifetime achievement award ==
Actor Mridula Barua was honoured with the lifetime Achievement Award for her contribution towards the Assamese film Industry.

== Other awards ==
- Best Writing on Cinema: Farhana Ahmed
- Jury's Special Mention: Kenny Basumatary – Local Kung Fu

== See also ==
- List of Assamese films of the 2010s
