= Anindita Paul =

Indian playback singer

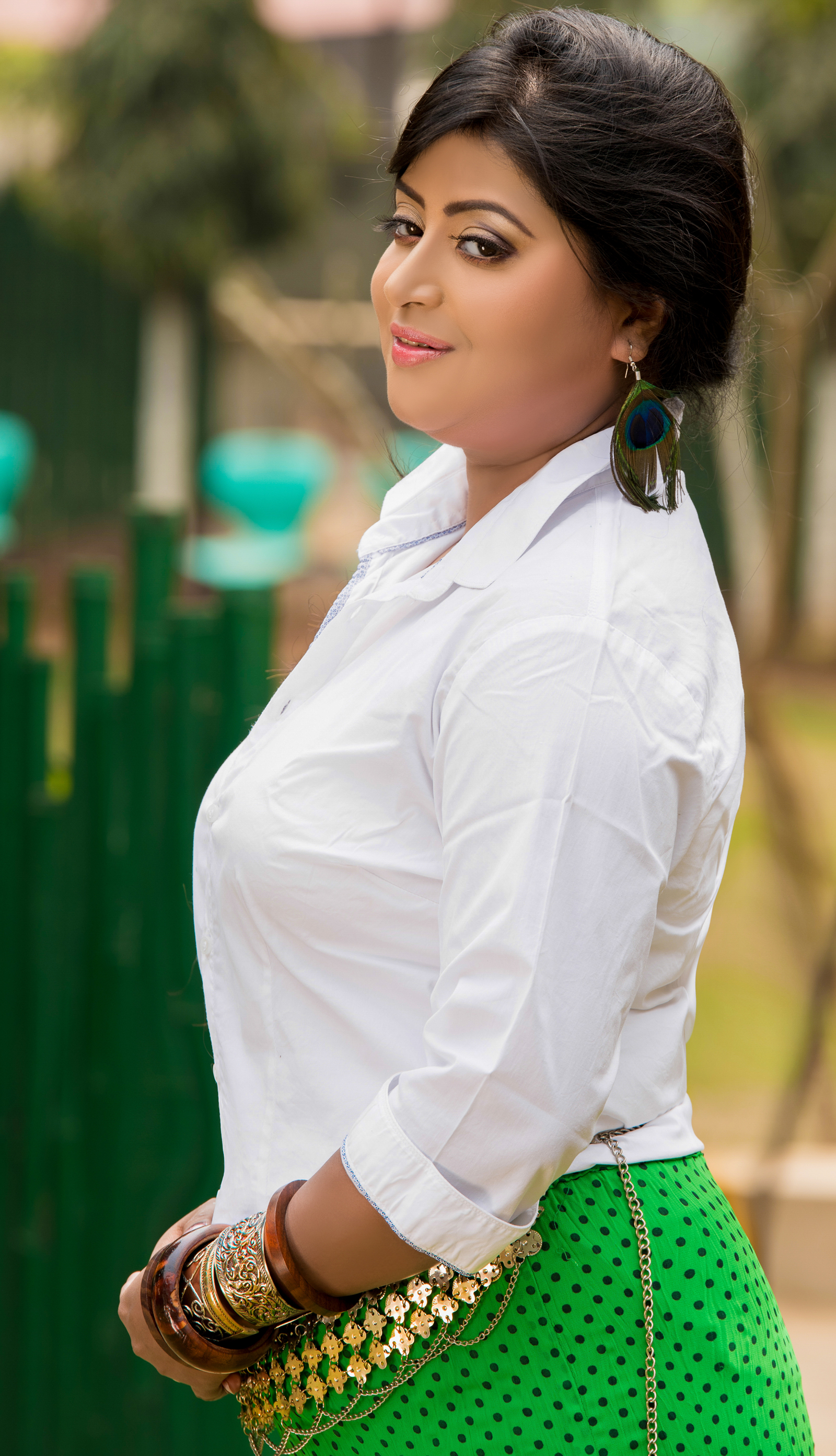
- Anindita at a photoshoot in Assam, 2016

Background information
- Born: Anindita Paul; Guwahati, Assam, India
- Genre: Indipop
- Occupations: Singer; composer; songwriter; producer
- Years active: 2000–present
- Website: www.aninditapaul.in

Anindita Paul is an Indian playback singer who performs primarily in Assamese, Bengali, and Hindi. She has worked in Assamese cinema and has recorded songs for Hindi and Bengali films.

== Career ==
Anindita Paul received a Visharad degree in Hindustani classical vocal music from an institution affiliated with the Bhatkhande Music Institute, Lucknow. She initially trained under Dipen Roy in Guwahati and later continued her training in Kolkata under Pandit Ajoy Chakraborty.

Paul began her career performing stage shows in Assam and later became an artist of Bhajans and modern songs at All India Radio.

In 2000, she released her first Assamese album, Bilot Tire Birai Podumor Pahi Oye. The lyrics and compositions were written by Kamalananda Bhattacharya. Paul sang three songs on the album, including the title track.

In 2001, Paul made her debut in Bollywood with the song “Kaisa Dhuan Uth Raha Hai” along with Zubeen Garg and Sagarika Mukherjee for Garg’s album Nupur. She later collaborated with Zubeen Garg on several projects in Assamese cinema, including the film Prem Aru Prem (2002).

Paul's debut solo album, Tumar Prasangshat (2010), was titled by poet Hiren Bhattacharyya.

== Film songs ==
Year	Film name / Album	Song
2021	Tomar Prasangshat	bokul phoolor dorez
2016	Gaane Ki Aane	Dancing Tonight
2014	Raag	a) Ayee Joon Jilmil Xondhiya b) Tuptup Shore Endhar c) Akou Ebar
2012	Kachhe Achho Tumi (Bengali Film)	Chokhe Chokhe
2011	Jetuka Pator Dore	Biphol Sokupanire
2010	Mon Niye (Bengali Film)	Chena Chena
2006	Aami Asomiya	Hei Khyon Aji Hatotey
2006	Adhinayak	Shopunor pahe pahe meli dilu axare soi
2005	Senai Mur Dhulia	Mitha ei rati
2004	Dinabandhu	(a) Kor Ejak Shopun Jen Boroshun (b) Diya muk diya
2003	Prem Bhara Chakalu	(a) Prem bhora sokulu (b) Akash Nila Kagojote
2002	Prem Aru Prem	Morom edhani morom

== Non-film songs ==
Year	Album	Song
2016	Hindi	Naina
2015	Hindi	Chamak
2015	Nandini (Assamese Mega Serial)	Title Song(Rang Channel)
2014	-	Poley Poley
2013	Pratigya (Assamese Mega Serial)	Title Song (Rang channel)
2010	Tumar Prashangshat	Aai o Aai
2010	Tumar Prashangshat	Bokul Phulor Dore
2010	Tumar Prashangshat	Phagoon Aahe
2001	Nupur (Zubeen's Hindi Album)	"Kaisa Dhuan"
2000	-	Sorai Halodhiya
2000	-	Bilot Tirebirai Podumor Pahi

== Recorded works in Hindi and other languages ==
Anindita Paul sang her first Hindi Song, "Kaisa Dhuan Uth Raha Hai", along with singers Zubeen Garg and Sagarika Mukherjee from Zubeen's album Nupur in 2001. Later, she also sang under Zubeen Garg's music direction in the Hindi film Strings and the Hindi-Assamese bilingual Ekhon Nedekha Nodir Xhipare. She has sung for Bengali films, including Kumauner Konya, under the music direction of Ravindra Jain. She has also lent her voice to the TV serial Remix (Star One) for music director Pritam.

Paul can be heard on the remix album Play-Gal Mix (released by Universal Music) and Dance Attack (released by His Master's Voice), and has recorded two Telugu devotional songs for flutist Naveen Kumar in Mumbai. Paul performed in the Spirit of Unity Concert for Universal Integration at Visakhapatnam in 2007, and she recently joined Shankar Mahadevan Productions’ musical show My Country My Music.

Paul has worked alongside Lata Mangeshkar in the Chhattisgarhi film Bhakla.

== Awards ==
Anindita Paul has been nominated twice for the National Film Awards: for the song 'Kor Ejak Shopun Jen Boroshun' from the film Dinabandhu and for 'Biphol Sokupanire' from Jetuka Pator Dore. Other awards include:

- 2004: Jyotipura Media Award for Best Female Playback Singer for 'Kor Ejak Shopun Jen Boroshun' (Dinabandhu)
- 2005: Prag Cine Award for Best Female Playback Singer for 'Kor Ejak Shopun Jen Boroshun' (Dinabandhu)
- 2010: Prag Cine Award for Best Female Playback Singer for 'Biphol sokupanire' (Jetuka Pator Dore)
- 2014: Prag Cine Award for Best Female Playback Singer for Raag (film)
- 2015: Assam State Award Best Female Playback Singer for Raag (film)
