= Ajeyo =

2014 film

- Theatrical release poster of Ajeyo
- Directed by: Jahnu Barua
- Screenplay by: Jahnu Barua
- Based on: Ashirbador Rong by Arun Sarma
- Produced by: Shankar Lall Goenka
- Starring: Rupam Chetia; Jupitora Bhuyan; Kopil Bora
- Cinematography: Sumon Dowerah
- Edited by: Hue-en Barua
- Music by: Dhrubajyoti Phukan
- Production company: Shiven Arts
- Release date: 3 January 2014
- Running time: 116 minutes
- Country: India
- Language: Assamese

Ajeyo (English: Invincible) is a 2014 Assamese language drama film directed by Jahnu Barua; based on the Sahitya Akademi Award winner 1997 Assamese novel Ashirbador Rong written by Arun Sharma and adapted as screenplay by the director himself. It was produced by Shankar Lall Goenka and stars Rupam Chetia and Jupitora Bhuyan in the lead roles. The film was released on 3 January 2014.

Ajeyo depicts the struggles of an honest, ideal revolutionary youth Gajen Keot who fought against the social evils in rural Assam during the freedom movement in India. The film won the Best Feature Film in Assamese award in the 61st National Film Awards and also won the Best Film award in the 2014 Prag Cine Awards.

== Plot ==
The story of Ajeyo takes place in a village of Assam in 1946, just some time before India's independence and partition. Gojen Keot (Rupam Chetia), an honest yet short-tempered young man, lives alone with his grandmother. By doing some odd jobs here and there, he struggles to earn proper livelihood. He supports Gandhi and believes that once India becomes independent, social injustice will end. Though he dropped out of school, he tutors the no-caste Muslim girl Hasina (Jupitora Bhuyan). Once as a rookie participant in the freedom struggle he failed to deliver a note to a team of marching protesters against the British that caused the lives of two freedom fighters. He regularly battles ghosts of his past related to this incident.

Most of the film involves Gojen's defiant rebellion of the richest man in town, who sees India's partition as an opportunity for land grabbing. Gojen also fights against caste restrictions and child marriage. He helps Joba (Munmi Kalita), a Brahmin girl widowed at age 18, to elope with freedom fighter Madan Sharma (Kopil Bora) against the wishes of her father. Later he marries Hasina and leaves the village.

The story then flashforwards to contemporary Assam, as Gojen's granddaughter (Rimpi Das), a high-ranking policewoman, is continuing her grandfather's fight against the social evils.

== Cast ==
- Rupam Chetia as young Gojen Keot
- Jupitora Bhuyan as Hasina
- Kopil Bora as Madan Sharma
- Bishnu Kharghoria as old Gojen Keot
- Munmi Kalita as Joba
- Rimpi Das as granddaughter of Gojen
- Pratibha as Gojen's grandmother
- Saurav Hazarika as school teacher
- Lakhi Borthakur as priest, Joba's father

== Production ==
The muhurat of the film was held on 30 November 2012 in Guwahati. The primary shooting of the film took place from 4 January 2013 near Dhola in Sadiya and later in Tinsukia. Rupam Chetia went through training for four months before filming. In the original novel by Arun Sharma, there was a grandson instead of a granddaughter of Gojen. According to director Jahnu Barua, "the male character, Keot, sees the past while the girl is progressive through whom Keot sees a ray of hope, again." Barua also mentioned that it was inspired from his mother who studied only till class two but managed 11 children and the household.

== Release ==
The film was released in Assam on 3 January 2014. Before the release, Ajeyo was screened at two film festivals. The film was first screened at 15th Mumbai Film Festival, which was held from 17 to 24 October 2013. Later it was screened at 6th Bengaluru International Film Festival, which was held from 26 December 2013 to 2 January 2014. Ajeyo was also screened at Kala Ghoda Arts Festival 2014 held from 1 to 9 February 2014.

=== Critical response ===
Ajeyo has received positive reviews. The performances of Rupam Chetia and Jupitora Bhuyan were highly praised.

== Accolades ==
Ajeyo received eleven Prag Cine Awards nominations and won in two categories including Best Film. It was also awarded as Best Feature Film in Assamese in 61st National Film Awards. Preceding Baandhon, it was the second consecutive win for director Jahnu Barua in this category. It was also the 12th National Award for Barua.

Ajeyo was also included in the "Special 10 of the Year (2014)" list published annually by Jeevan Initiative, a voluntary association. The film made to the list due to its reflection of social situations around the independence era and people's survival struggle to face the situation in an artistically–unique style and down to earth film-making.

Award	Date	Category	Recipients and nominees	Result
Prag Cine Award	22 March 2014	Best Film		Won
Prag Cine Award	22 March 2014	Best Costume	Geetarani Goswami	Won
Prag Cine Award	22 March 2014	Best Actor Male	Rupam Chetia	Nominated
Prag Cine Award	22 March 2014	Best Actor Female	Jupitora Bhuyan	Nominated
Prag Cine Award	22 March 2014	Best Supporting Actor Female	Pratibha Choudhury	Nominated
Prag Cine Award	22 March 2014	Best Editing	Hue-en Barua	Nominated
Prag Cine Award	22 March 2014	Best Cinematography	Sumon Dowerah	Nominated
Prag Cine Award	22 March 2014	Best Music Direction	Dhrubajyoti Phukan	Nominated
Prag Cine Award	22 March 2014	Best Sound Recordist	Jatin Sharma	Nominated
Prag Cine Award	22 March 2014	Best Art Direction	Fatik Barua	Nominated
Prag Cine Award	22 March 2014	Best Makeup	Asitabh Baruah	Nominated
61st National Film Awards	16 April 2014 (announcement); 3 May 2014 (ceremony)	Best Feature Film in Assamese	Producer: Shiven Arts; Director: Jahnu Barua	Won
