= Zerifa Wahid =

Indian actress and politician

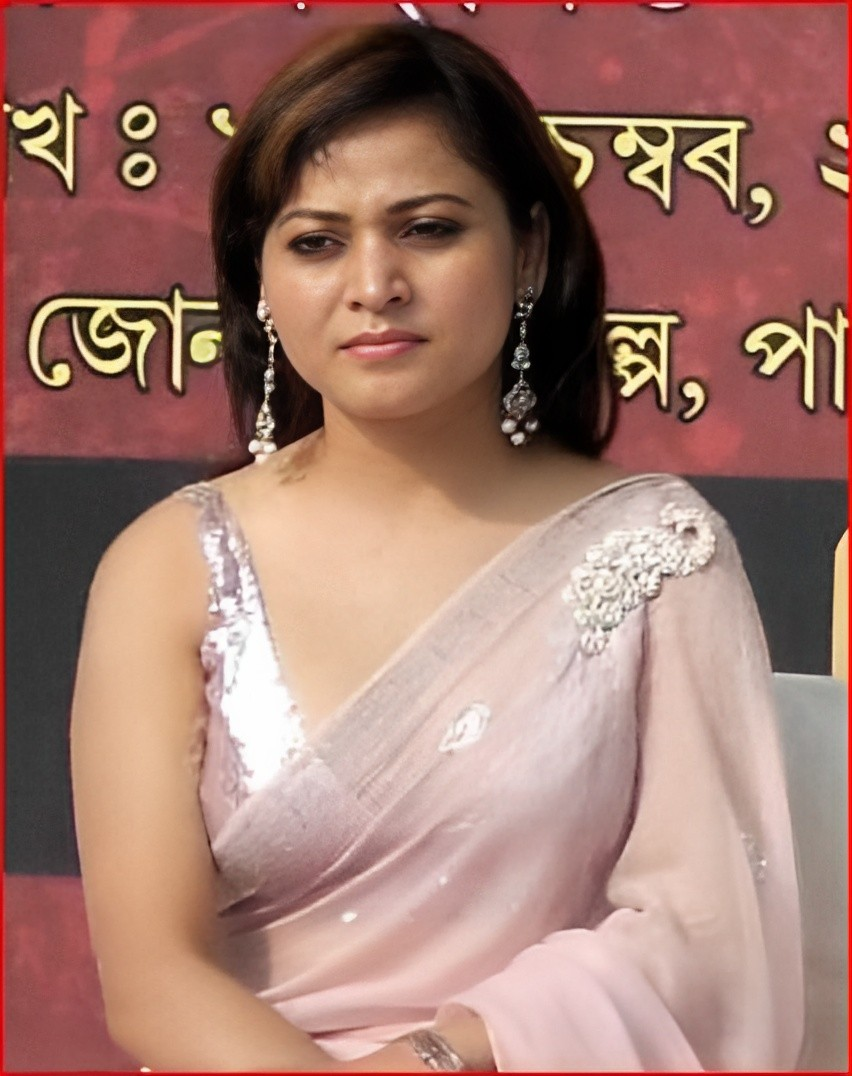
- Zerifa Wahid in December 2011
- Born: Assam, India
- Education: Delhi University
- Occupations: Actress; politician
- Years active: 1990–present
- Political party: Assam Jatiya Parishad (2021–present)
- Other political affiliations: Raijor Dal (2021)

Zerifa Wahid (Assamese pronunciation: [zɛɹiɸa waɦid]) is an Indian actress and politician known for her works in Assamese films. Her prominent features include Baandhon, which won the 60th National Film Awards for Best Feature Film in Assamese directed by Jahnu Baruah, and the best film in the Indian Films Competition held at the Bengaluru International Film Festival for the year 2012.

== Early life ==
Wahid hails from Assam. Her father was an actor in his university and also wrote screenplays, while her uncle owned operated a production house. She is a law graduate from Delhi University.

== Career ==
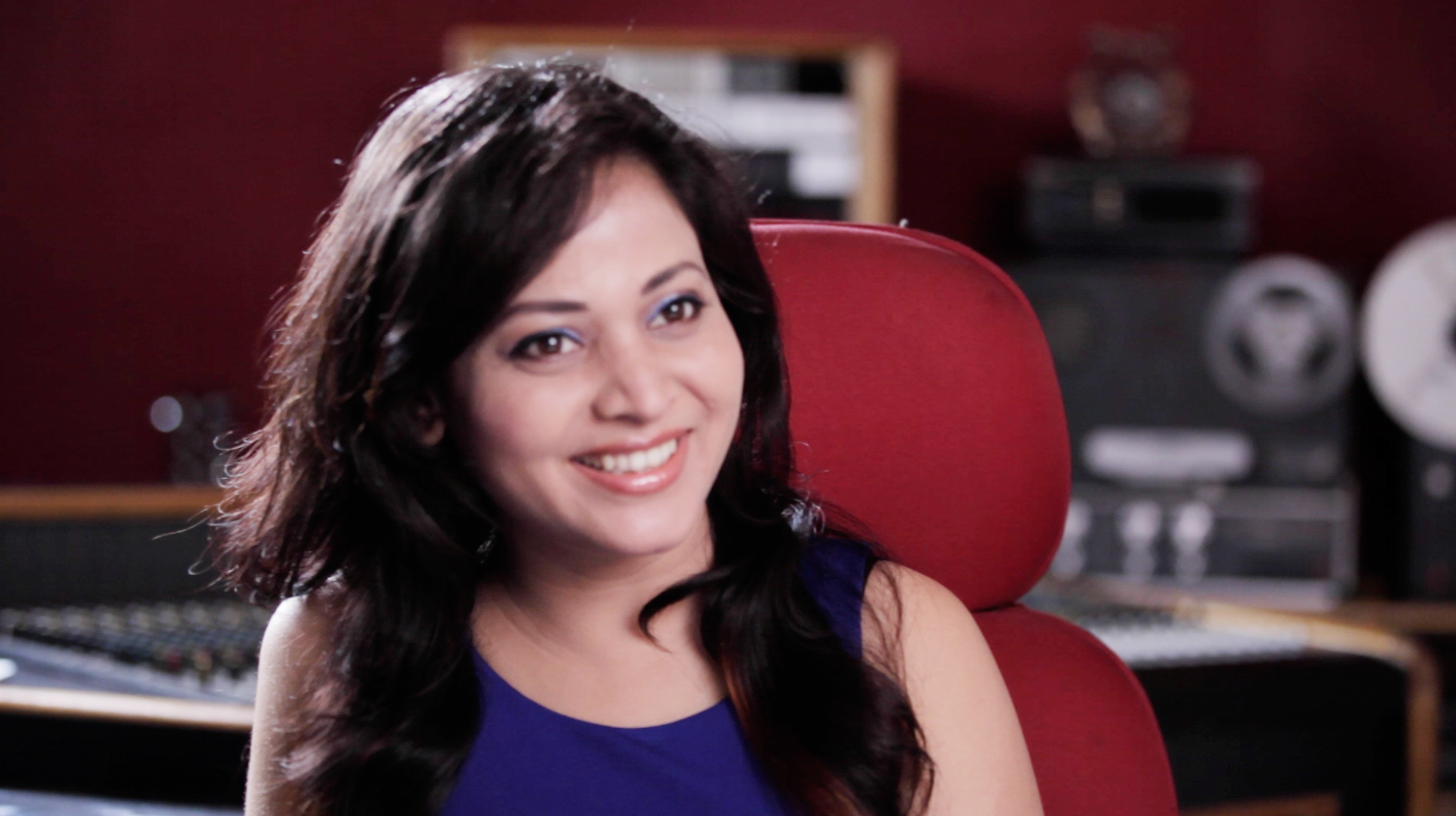
Wahid at TeachAids recording session in 2013

Zerifa Wahid started her acting career as a child actor by making her debut in the Assamese feature film Abhimaan in 1990. Alongside her brilliant academic career, she managed to continue with her passion for acting and worked as a leading heroine in numerous Assamese feature films, television serials, video films, music albums and TV commercials. Wahid has branched out in many sectors of social works, film and theatre productions. She is the Ambassador for Assam Autism Foundation and Special Olympics Bharat (Assam Chapter). She also endorses the IT brand Datamation.

Jahnu Baruah's Baandhon was the Inaugural film in the Indian Panorama section in the International Film Festival of India, Goa 2012, which also won the National Awards (Rajat Kamal) as the best regional film, and Bidyut Chakravarty's Dwaar released in 2013 received wide critical acclaim.

Her film Raag: The Rhythm of Love with Adil Hussain, Kopil Bora and Kenny Basumatary released on 7 February 2014 in Assam, was released by PVR Cinemas nationwide on 7 March 2014.

Zerifa Wahid's latest feature film to be released in June 2016 named Kothanodi: The River of Fables directed by Bhaskar Hazarika and starring Adil Hussain, Seema Biswas, Kopil Bora and others won the post -production grant and was premiered in the Busan International Film Festival in Oct 2015. The film was also officially screened in the BFI London Film Festival, MAMI Mumbai International Film Festival, Gothenburg Film Festival and many other prestigious film festivals across the globe.

== Zerifa Wahid Productions ==
Zerifa Wahid launched her own production company, Zerifa Wahid Productions (ZWP). Being very intimately associated with the theatre movement in Assam with powerful performances in several stage plays and who loves to call herself a "Theatre Worker", ZWP has successfully acted and produced well-known Stage Plays like Girish Karnad's The Fire And The Rain, the Assamese version of which was named Agnibrishti, British dramatist's Peter Shaffer's Five Finger Exercise, the Assamese Adaptation of which was named Pancharatna; Girish Karnad's Nagamandala, which was selected in the Mahrindra Excellence in Theatre Awards 2012 with ten nominations and was staged in Delhi on 5 March 2012. Purush, a play by Padmashree Arun Sharma was staged in 2012 under the banner of her production.

In June 2013, ZWP staged another play by Padmashri Arun Sarma, Napoleon, at Rabindra Bhawan, Guwahati. The several shows of Napoleon won unprecedented response from the audience and media acclaim. Continuing with its tradition, ZWP launched its latest play Moromor Bondhu, an adaptation of A. R. Gurney's Love Letters in Assamese on 25 July 2014 in Guwahati. Expanding its creative endeavours, ZWP introduced a festival of plays in the months of November and December 2014 named as Just Theatre in Guwahati, which showcased three plays: Girish Karnad's Nagamandala, Arun Sarma's Napoleon, and A. R. Gurney's Love Letters in its Assamese adaptation, called Moromor Bondhu. In 2015, ZWP produced the Assamese Adaptation of Girish Karnad's very popular play, Wedding Album. In March 2016, she produced premiered Gurney's Love Letters, retaining the Assamese adapted name Moromor Bondhu.

== Political career ==
Wahid joined Raijor Dal in 2020. On 15 March 2021, she left Raijor Dal and joined the Assam Jatiya Parishad after being denied party ticket in the 2021 Assam Legislative Assembly elections.

== Filmography ==
=== Films ===
| Year | Film | Director | Note |
|---|---|---|---|
| 1990 | Abhimaan | Mridul Gupta | Making her debut in Assamese film as child artist |
| | Atikram | | |
| | Headmaster | | |
| | Dhua | | |
| 1994 | Agnigarh | Chandra Mudoi | |
| 2000 | Tumi Mur Mathu Mur | Zubeen Garg | |
| 2001 | Seuji Dharani Dhunia | Rajib Bhattacharya | |
| 2001 | Anya Ek Jaatra | Manju Bora | |
| 2001 | Nayak | Munin Barua | |
| 2002 | Gun Gun Gaane Gaane | Bidyut Chakravarty | |
| 2002 | Prem Geet | Ashish Saikia | |
| 2003 | Agnisakshi | Jadumani Dutta | Won the Best Actor in a leading Role Female in The State Film Award, Govt Of Assam |
| 2004 | Antaheen Jatra | Munna Ahmed | |
| 2004 | Kadambari | Bani Das | |
| 2006 | Deuta Diya Bidaay | Ramesh Modi | |
| 2006 | Aami Asomiya | Rajib Bhattacharya | |
| 2008 | Ahir Bhairav | Siva Prasad Thakur | |
| 2012 | Baandhon | Jahnu Barua | |
| 2013 | Dwaar | Bidyut Chakravarty | won the first Filmfare Awards East 2014 (Best Actress) |
| 2014 | Raag: The Rhythm of Love | Rajni Basumatary | with Adil Hussain |
| | Goriali | | (under production) |
| 2016 | Kothanodi: The River of Fables | Bhaskar Hazarika | Kothanodi won the Best Feature Film in Assamese in 63rd National Film Awards |
| 2016 | Gaane Ki Aane | Rajesh Jashpal | Special appearance in the song "Dancing Tonight". |
| 2018 | Bhoga Khirikee | Jahnu Barua | with Adil Hussain |

== Music Videos ==
| Year | Song | Album | Singer(s) | Note |
|---|---|---|---|---|
| 2003 | Alakananda Uthor Hahi | Mur Xuria Geet | Zubeen Garg | First Assamese song to be aired on Channel V |
