= Love in Tawang =

Love in Tawang লভ্ ইন টাৱাং
- Directed by: Dipak Nath
- Written by: Dipak Nath
- Starring: Dhruv; Spainee
- Cinematography: Hiten Thakuria
- Music by: Abhijit Barman; Dipak Nath
- Production company: Siddhartha Telefilms
- Distributed by: Siddhartha Telefilms
- Release date: 11 March 2016
- Country: India
- Language: Assamese

Love in Tawang (অসমীয়া:লভ্ ইন টাৱাং) is a 2016 Indian Assamese-language romantic film directed by Dipak Nath under the banner of Siddhartha Telefilms. Newcomers Dhruv and Spainee are in the lead roles. This film's songs are composed by Abhijit Barman.

== Cast ==
The cast features Assamese, Monpa, and Bhutanese artistes.

- Dhruv
- Spainee
- Arun Nath
- Atul Pachoni
- Subhash Mudok
- Biswajeet Hazarika
- Juri Devi
- Simashree Bora

== Production ==
Dipak Nath, writer of Mahasamar (2013), directs this film.

== Soundtrack ==
This film's soundtrack was composed by Abhijit Barman. Lyrics by Dipak Nath. Three songs are in Assamese, one in Hindi, and one in English.

No.	Title	Artist(s)	Length
1.	"Nila Nila"	Zubeen Garg, Priyanka Bharali	4:4
2.	"Love in Tawang"	Ritrisha Sharmah	3:11
3.	"Sajna"	Priyanka Bharali	4:1
