= Stumped (film) =

2003 film by Gaurav Pandey

- Directed by: Gaurav Pandey
- Written by: Gaurav Pandey
- Produced by: Raveena Tandon
- Starring: Raveena Tandon
- Cinematography: Debu Deodhar
- Edited by: Sanjib Datta
- Music by: Pritam; Zubeen Garg; Ram Sampath; Shamir Tandon
- Production company: Reel Life Entertainment
- Distributed by: Shemaroo Entertainment
- Release date: 11 April 2003 (India)
- Running time: 121 minutes
- Country: India
- Language: Hindi
- Budget: ₹2 crore
- Box office: ₹9 lakh

Stumped is a 2003 Indian sports drama film written and directed by Gaurav Pandey and produced by Raveena Tandon. This film marks Tandon's first film as producer. Cricket player Sachin Tendulkar and actor Salman Khan made cameo appearances in the film.

Despite a notable promotional campaign, the film had little impact after its release.

== Plot ==
Reena and her husband Major Raghav Seth; Ranga Khetrapal, Swadesh Deshpande, and their respective wives; Laltu Singh, his wife, Neetu, and son, Bhola; the building watchman, Dukhiram; bachelor Subramaniam; and a visually challenged holy man, Baba, are some of the residents in Happy Home Society. The common interest shared by most of them is their love of playing and watching cricket. Reena experiences isolation after her husband is called back to Kargil to battle terrorists. She is befriended by three youngsters who have a crush on her. Things, however, change dramatically after she gets word that her husband is missing and believed dead. But by the film's end, it is revealed that the husband is miraculously alive and reunites with Reena.

== Cast ==
- Raveena Tandon as Reena R. Seth
- Alyy Khan as Major Raghav Seth
- Viju Khote
- Suresh Menon as Killer
- Amin Gazi as Girish
- Anjan Srivastav as Man in Brothel
- Sachin Tendulkar as Himself
- Salman Khan as Himself

== Soundtrack ==
Stumped

Soundtrack album by Pritam
- Released: 2002
- Genre: Feature Film soundtrack
- Length: 45:24
- Label: AA Films
- Producer: Pritam

Pritam chronology
Stumped (2002)	Fun2shh... Dudes in the 10th Century (2003)

The Music was Composed by Pritam Chakraborty and lyrics was penned by Abbas Tyrewala except two tracks "Naam Apna", which was sung, composed and written by Zubeen Garg and "Tanha Dil" which was sung and written by Shaan and composed by Ram Sampath, however, both were added as hidden tracks and are not used in the film and not mentioned on the tracklist. It was Pritam's first solo album.

No.	Title	Writer(s)	Singer(s)	Length
1.	"Humko Toh Hai Poora Yakeen"		Anindita Paul, KK, Udit Narayan, Alka Yagnik, Shankar Mahadevan, Kavita Krishnamurthi, Shubha Mudgal, Sadhana Sargam, Sujatha Mohan, Sudesh Bhosle	4:34
2.	"Stumped"		Sonu Nigam	4:10
3.	"Aise Hi Bada Hua Gavaskar"		Kumar Sanu, Hrithik Roshan, Anil Kapoor, Gulzar	4:31
4.	"Ek Sapna (Slow Version)"		Shashwati Phukan	5:16
5.	"Sona Chandi"		Rakesh Pandit	4:05
6.	"Humko Toh Hai Poora Yakeen (Remix)"		KK, Hariharan, Babul Supriyo, Sudesh Bhosle	4:34
7.	"Ek Sapna (Remix)"		Kalpana Patowary	5:16
8.	"Yeh Desh Hai Veer Jawano Ka"		Gurdas Maan	3:21
9.	"Naam Apna" (Hidden Track)	Zubeen Garg	Zubeen Garg	5:55
10.	"Tanha Dil" (Hidden Track)	Shaan	Shaan	4:55
Total length:				45:24
