= Dhrubajyoti Phukan =

Indian musician

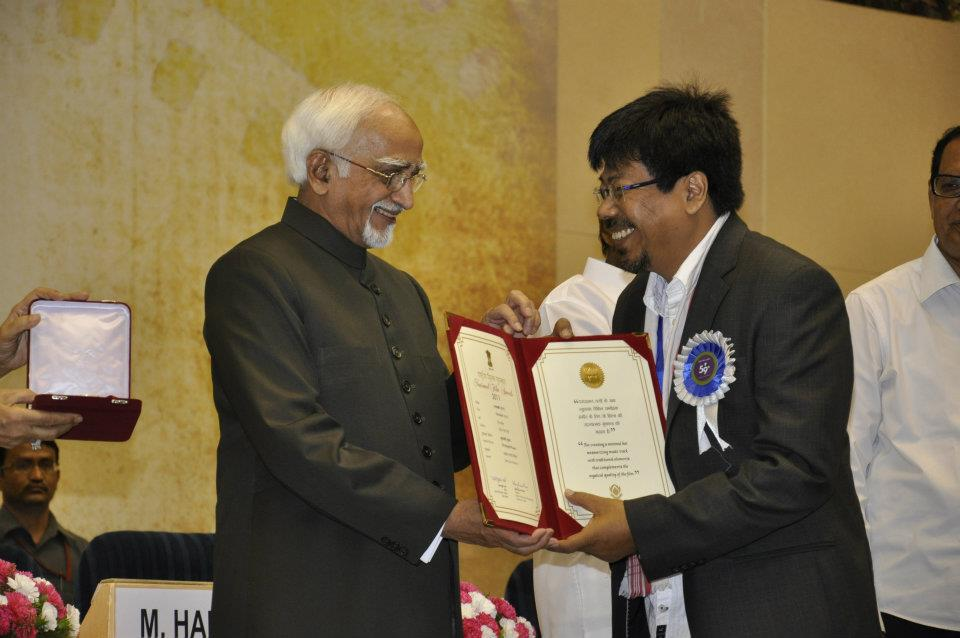
- Dhrubajyoti Phukan, receiving the best music director award from the Vice President of India Mohammad Hamid Ansari (59th National Film Awards 2011) at New Delhi.
- Born: Dhrubajyoti Phukan; 17 June 1964 (age 62); Dibrugarh, Assam
- Other name: DJ Phukan
- Education: Mechanical Engineer from Assam Engineering College, Assam
- Occupations: Music Director, Music Producer, Music Arranger, Music production Supervisor, Background Music Director and Music Programmer
- Years active: 1989–present
- Spouse: Shashwati Phukan
- Children: Shreya Phukan; Ayush Phukan
- Parent(s): Atulananda Phukan; Amiya Phukan

Dhrubajyoti Phukan is a National Film Award winning musician who has worked as a Music Producer, Music Arranger and Music Programmer in Hindi Films. Widely known as DJ Phukan, he has also worked as a music director for several films.

== Composing career ==
In 2012, Phukan won the 59th National Film Awards as the best Music Director for his music in the Hindi short film Panchakki. It capped an intermittent but creatively fecund career as a music director which began with the Raveena Tandon production Stumped in 2003. Recently, he also composed for renowned director Jahnu Barua's films Baandhon and Ajeyo, both of which bagged the National Film Award for Best Feature Film in Assamese.

== Personal life ==
Dhrubajyoti Phukan married singer Shaswati Phukan in 1991, and is the father of a daughter, Shreya Phukan, and a son, Ayushjyoti Phukan.

== Selective discography as music arranger ==
Year	Film name	Song
2014	Ek Villain	"Galliyan"
2014	Ek Villain	"Awaari"
2013	Aashiqui 2	"Sunn Raha Hai Na Tu"
2013	Dhoom 3	"Kamli"
2013	Dhoom 3	"Dhoom Machaale"
2013	Yeh Jawaani Hai Deewani	"Badtameez Dil"
2013	Race 2	"Party On My Mind"
2012	Barfi!	"Kyun"
2012	Barfi!	"Ala Barfi"
2012	Cocktail	"Daru Desi" (GIMA 2012 nominated)
2012	Blood Money	"Chaahat"
2012	Agent Vinod	"Dil Mera Muft Ka"
2012	Agent Vinod	"Pungi"
2011	Desi Boyz	"Subah Hone Na De"
2011	Desi Boyz	"Desi Boyz"
2011	Bodyguard	"I love you"
2011	Murder 2	"Haale Dil"
2011	Ready	"Character Dheelaa"
2011	Dum Maro Dam	"Dum Maro Dum"
2011	Thank You	"Razia"
2010	Action Replayy	"Zor Ka Jhatkaa"
2010	Khatta Meetha	"Aa Tichya Mailaa"
2010	Once Upon a Time in Mumbaai	"Pee Loon"
2010	Raajneeti	"Bhigi Si, Bhagi Si"
2009	Love Aaj Kal	"Aahun Aahun"
2009	Love Aaj Kal	"Chor Bazaari"
2009	Ajab Prem Ki Ghazab Kahani	"Tera Hone Laga Hun"
2009	Jashnn	"Darde Tanhaaiyan"
2009	Aa Dekhen Zara	"Ghazeb Hoio Rama"
2009	Raaz 2	"Maahi Maahi"
2008	Singh Is Kinng	"Teri Ore"
2008	Singh Is Kinng	"Bhootni Ke"
2008	Jannat	"Zara Si Dil Mein"
2008	Race	"Zara Zara Touch Mein"
2008	Kismat Konnection	"Is This Love"
2007	Jab We Met	"Mauja Hi Mauja"
2007	Jab We Met	"Yeh Ishq Hai"
2007	Dhan Dhana Dhan Goal	"Billo Rani"
2007	Awarapan	"To Phir Aao"
2007	Kya Love Story Hai	"It's Rocking"
2006	Dhoom 2	"Dhoom Again"
2006	Fanaa	"Chand Sifarish"
2006	Gangster	"Tuhi Mera Shab Hai"
2006	Pyaar Ke Side Effects	"Tauba Main Pyaar Karke Pachtaya"
2006	Pyaar Ke Side Effects	"Jaane Kya Chaahe"
2004	Hum Tum	"Saason Ko Saason Mein"
2002	Kaante	"Maahi Ve"
2002	Kaante	"Ishq Samundar"
2002	Kaante	"Jane Kya Hoga Rama Re"

== Filmography ==
=== As background music composer ===
Year	Film
2014	Ajeyo (Assamese)
2012	Baandhon (Assamese)
2011	Panchakki (National Award Winner)
2005	Jackpot
2005	Pyaar Mein Twist
2003	Janasheen
2003	Chura Liyaa Hai Tumne
2003	Sandhya
1998	Pardesi Babu

=== As music director ===
Year	Film
2014	Ajeyo (Assamese)
2012	Baandhon (Assamese)
2011	Panchakki (National Award Winner)
2005	Jackpot
2003	Sandhya
2003	Stumped

== Honours ==
Year	Honours
2010	Awarded Shilpapran Chandra Phukan award by Natya Prabar Sharadakanta Bordoloi and Shilpapran Chandra Phukan award committee.
2010	Felicitated by Chief Minister of Assam, Mr. Tarun Gogoi at Kalashetra, Guwahati, for contribution in music in Assam as well in India.

== Awards ==
Year	Award	Category	Nominated work	Result	Ref.
2010	Mirchi Music Awards	Best Programmer & Arranger of the Year	"Mere Bina" from Crook	Nominated	
2011	National Film Awards	Best Non-Feature Film Music Direction	Panchakki	Won	
2012	Mirchi Music Awards	Programmer & Arranger of the Year	"Dil Mera Muft Ka" from Agent Vinod	Won	
2013	Mirchi Music Awards	Programmer & Arranger of the Year	"Badtameez Dil" from Yeh Jawaani Hai Deewani	Won	
2014	GiMA Awards 2014	Best Music Arranger and Programmer	"Badtameez Dil" from Yeh Jawaani Hai Deewani	Won	
2014	GiMA Awards 2014	Best Music Arranger and Programmer	"Sunn Raha Hai" from Aashiqui 2	Nominated	
2015	GiMA Awards 2015	Best Music Arranger and Programmer	"Awaari" from Ek Villain	Nominated	
2015	Mirchi Music Awards	Best Song Producer (Programming & Arranging)	"Selfie Le Le Re" from Bajrangi Bhaijaan	Nominated	
2016	Mirchi Music Awards	Best Song Producer (Programming & Arranging)	"Dhaakad" from Dangal	Nominated	
2017	Mirchi Music Awards	Best Song Producer (Programming & Arranging)	"Ghar" from Jab Harry Met Sejal	Nominated	
2017	Mirchi Music Awards	Best Song Producer (Programming & Arranging)	"Ullu Ka Pattha" from Jagga Jasoos	Nominated	
2017	Mirchi Music Awards	Best Song Producer (Programming & Arranging)	"Radio(Film Version)" from Tubelight	Nominated	
2019	Mirchi Music Awards	Best Song Producer (Programming & Arranging)	"Ghar More Pardesiya" from Kalank	Nominated	
2019	Mirchi Music Awards	Best Song Producer (Programming & Arranging)	"Kalank - Title Track" from Kalank	Nominated	
2021	Mirchi Music Awards	Best Song Producer(s) – Programming & Arranging	"Shayad" from Love Aaj Kal (2020 film)	Nominated	
2021	Mirchi Music Awards	Best Song Producer(s) – Programming & Arranging	"Aabaad Barbaad" from Ludo)	Nominated	
2021	Mirchi Music Awards	Best Song Producer(s) – Programming & Arranging	"Malang (Title Track)" from Malang - Unleash The Madness)	Nominated	
2022	Mirchi Music Awards	Song Producer - Programming & Arranging	"Kesariya" from Brahmāstra: Part One – Shiva	Nominated	
