= Jai Ho Democracy =

2015 Indian film

- Directed by: Ranjit Kapoor & Bikramjeet Singh Bhullar
- Story by: Ranjit Kapoor, Sreekanth Agneeaswaran and Bikramjeet Bhullar
- Produced by: Bikramjeet Bhullar
- Starring: Om Puri; Annu Kapoor; Satish Kaushik; Seema Biswas; Adil Hussain; Aamir Bashir; Grusha Kapoor; Rajni Gujral; Benjamin Gilani
- Cinematography: Arvind Kannabiran
- Edited by: Roshni D'Souza, Ashwin Hegde
- Music by: Ray N Brotherhood
- Production company: Indian Production House
- Distributed by: Multimedia Combines
- Release date: 24 April 2015
- Running time: 85 minutes
- Country: India
- Language: Hindi
- Budget: INR 3 Crore

Jai Ho! Democracy is a 2015 Indian comedy film written and directed by Ranjit Kapoor, who was also the dialogue writer of Jaane Bhi Do Yaaro and has been produced by Bikramjeet Bhullar of Indian Production House. It is a dark satire on Indian politics and takes a dig at the existing social and political morass India is staring at currently. It stars an ensemble cast that includes the likes of Om Puri, Annu Kapoor, Satish Kaushik, Adil Hussain and Seema Biswas.

The film's trailer was released on 18 March 2015, and is scheduled to release on 24 April 2015. It is about the murky world of India's political class, where ministers and leaders procrastinate over everything, even on something as grave as border security. Jai Ho! Democracy also takes a satirical look at the media's desperation to stay ahead in the TRP game, sensationalizing even the most trivial situation without any qualms.

== Plot ==
A freak incident in an Indian camp along the LoC triggers a war of words with their Pakistani counterparts on the other side of the no-man’s land. News of this standoff between the two camps gets leaked to a super-enthu news reporter and in no time, news spreads on national television that India and Pakistan are on the brink of a war.

This sensational disclosure, with no concrete evidence whatsoever, takes both the public and the government by surprise. The international bodies are alarmed, too. The Home Minister, in a bid to buy time, sets up a committee meeting to discuss the situation, submitting that they will decide whether India should go for war or not.

Chaired by an ex-Supreme Court Judge, the committee consists of members from the parliament, ex-servicemen and NGO workers. What follows is a series of hilarious events in the committee meeting, where the members, relying on silly excuses of so-called parliamentary rules and etiquette, go full throttle to tear each other apart. Within no time, the actual matter for discussion is lost in the chaos and they indulge in unbelievably petty and personal ego clashes. All this… even as the army, the government, the public and the world bodies wait with bated breath for their decisions. Till finally, the venue of the committee meeting turns into a battlefield, with the members going for each other’s throats.

The film takes a comic look at the way the powers-that-be love to procrastinate and maintain status quo, unfazed by the gravity of situations at hand. It explores the hilarity of the levels to which the media can go to sensationalize issues. It also gives a message of hope to peace through a glimpse of a Utopian possibility, albeit momentary, between the armies of the two neighboring nations.

== Cast ==
- Om Puri as Pandeyji
- Annu Kapoor as Ramalingam
- Satish Kaushik as Choudhry
- Seema Biswas as Mohini Devi
- Adil Hussain as Major Baruah
- Aamir Bashir as Bashir Baig
- Grusha Kapoor as Dulari Devi
- Rajni Gujral as Mrs. Bedi
- Benjamin Gilani as Gen. G. S. Sandhu
- Ishtiyak Khan as Santosh, Chirantan

== Production ==
Ranjit Kapoor, the writer of cult classic of 1983 - Jaane Bhi Do Yaaron, and Bikramjeet Singh Bhullar decided to revisit the satirical genre with Jai Ho! Democracy, a satirical comedy reflecting the current state of political and social affairs in India. Ranjit Kapoor and his team which has Sreekanth Agneeaswaran and Bikramjeet Bhullar, had been working on this idea for two years. Their intent was to make a wholesome comedy that people could watch repeatedly, which would also serve as a mirror for our society.

Ranjit kapoor wanted to take up the challenge of showcasing good cinema without the hoopla of mega star-casts, item songs or big budgets. He chose to cast seasoned actors like Om Puri, Annu Kapoor, Satish Kaushik, Seema Biswas, Adil Hussain, Dolly Ahluwalia, and many others, who have left a mark in Indian cinema and theatre with their beyond comparison acting. The film was shot in two schedules, one in Mumbai and the other in Sri Ganganagar. The film got completed in a record 28 days. Ranjit Kapoor credited his son-in-law Bikramjeet Singh, who is the co-writer, co-director and producer, with the creative process and detailing of the film.

The movie with a runtime of 85 minutes received U/A Censor Certificate. The film will hit the theatres on 24 April 2015.

In one of the interviews when Ranjit Kapoor was asked about his preference between Theatre and Film, he mentioned that he refrains from working for films because distribution companies and financiers usually abstain from unique concepts and stick with commercial cinema. This hinders a lot of thought provoking cinema and great acting from reaching the audiences. In comparison, theatre gives a platform to quench the thirst of delivering unique matter to niche audience which appreciates distinctive story-lines.

== Reception ==
Vishal Thakur of the Hindi daily Hindustan wrote that the film did not match Ranjeet Kapoor's temperament and writing.

== Soundtrack ==
The music for Jai Ho! Democracy is composed by Ray N Brotherhood and includes 3 tracks. The lyrics have been done by Yash Bhardwaj and Sreekanth Agneeaswaran. Sound design has been done by Hitesh Chaurasia.

No.	Title	Lyrics	Singer(s)	Length
1.	Jai Ho Democracy	Sreekanth Agneeaswaran	Sandeep Madhavan, Vyshnav Balasubramaniam, Ray	3:29
2.	Committee	Sreekanth Agneeaswaran	Om Puri, Anu Kapoor, Grusha Kapoor	2:12
3.	Lambee Ho Jaye Raat	Yash Bhardwaj	Wadali Brothers	6:06
4.	Lambee Ho Jaye Raat - Goa House Mix	Yash Bhardwaj	Abhishek	5:19

== Controversies ==
The Central Board of Film Certification required the removal of certain scenes of the film which involved usage of certain abusive phrases. The film was submitted again for approval after making required edits, post which it received U/A certification. However, some members of the cast remained dissatisfied. Annu Kapoor, actor and brother of Ranjit Kapoor, who is playing the character of Ramalingam in the film, termed it as curbing of freedom of expression. He stated that the character portrayal justified those scenes akin to usage of any abusive language in a scene involving slum residents or item songs in commercial cinema. Unlike Annu Kapoor, Om Puri, who plays the role of Pandeyji, stated that abusive language should not be allowed in films and that the success of a film is independent of abuses.

Questioning the definition of mainstream cinema, Om Puri stated that though this is an independent film with lot of heart and passion. it is as mainstream as the other films with a full package of entertainment and comedy but without the KHANS.
