= One Last Question =

- poster
- Directed by: Prathamesh Krisang
- Written by: Amit Bembalkar; Prathamesh Krisang; Siddhesh Purkar
- Produced by: Prathamesh Krisang
- Starring: Adil Hussain; Jitumoni Deka; Rahul Dev Nath; Dhruv Kalra; Kritika Pande; Dibyakumar Rabha; Saurabh Rabha; Prashant Sharma
- Cinematography: Prathamesh Krisang
- Edited by: Onkar Pradhan
- Music by: Anurag Saikia
- Production company: Krisang Pictures
- Release date: 2015
- Running time: 31 minutes
- Country: India
- Language: Hindi

One Last Question is a 2015 Indian Hindi-language short film directed by Prathamesh Krisang. It is inspired from a true story in 1998 from a blog titled, "Agia to Oxford" by Manjit Nath. The film takes the viewer back to the Indian state of Assam in 1998. It is basically a memoir of a person who had been on the verge of abandoning education and taking up arms against the state, but who was then counseled by his father, which set him on the right and, hence, a better direction. The pivotal character of Tultul’s father in the film has been played by actor, Adil Hussain.

The 31 minute film revolves around a 15-year-old boy named Tultul and his three friends. They are inspired to join an extremist group which has been fighting to gain independence for Assam from the Republic of India. The story is about hope and how teenagers go astray in awe for extremist leaders and their elusive promises. It also portrays how parents can guide their children by informing them of a better way to bring about changes.

The film was premiered on in multiple national and international film festivals. Numerous scenes have been shot at locations around Assam. It took one and a half year for the filmmaker to get the film ready, and this includes getting it crowd funded in the middle of the production . It depicts the state of affairs in insurgency-ridden state of Assam from the Republic of India and how youth is getting attracted by militant outfits. The story evolves as the four friends turn from innocence to violence and are self-imposed to decide their own future.

== Plot ==
The film revolves around a 15-year-old boy named Tultul and his three friends, who are inspired to join a militant outfit after having been incited with patriotic sentiments by a rebel leader. The trio of Tultul’s friends try to absorb Tultul into their hatched plan of sneaking out of their homes to join the rebel forces, lest they are hindered by their parents. Tultul finds it difficult to make up his mind. Tultul's father happens to discover the revolutionary poems composed by him and realizes the need of a guiding light for Tultul. He guides Tultul out of the dilemma of joining rebellion by informing him that books, and not guns, are the real agents of change. Tultul abides by the advice of his father, gets educated from one of the top universities of the world and moves ahead to be a real harbinger of change, while his friends perish into the inferno of militancy.

The plot is based on the true life-story of a young man from Assam, named Manjit Nath, who had been on the verge of turning into a militant. While touching the underlying issues of armed rebellions, teen militants and importance of education as an agent of change, the attempts to drive home the point that – there is a better way than militancy in which one can help one's community prosper.

== Cast ==
- Adil Hussain as Deuta (transl. Father)
- Dhruv Kalra
- Kritika Pande
- Jitu Moni Deka
- Sawrabh Rabha
- Dibya Kumar Rabha
- Prashant Sharma
- Rahul Deb Nath

== Production ==
The film has been shot on minimal setup consisting of Canon 5D Mk III, mostly 24–70 mm 2.8 Lens and occasionally a 75-300 for a few shot. Financial assistance to the film production was also given by the people of the locality where the film was being shot, hence the tagline, "a film by a lot of people." The film production is yet to be completed and is looking forward to crowd funding for financial assistance.

== Theme ==
Years of armed struggle, violent military operations, absence of economic development, and hunger for power of cunning extremist leaders color the minds of the young teenagers, drawing them into the nefarious web of teen militancy.

== Awards ==
- Golden Palm Award – Best First-time Filmmaker at 10th Mexico International Film Festival, 2015
- Official Selection in Main Competition at Kinolub Film Festival, Poland 2015
- Best Film Award at 1st Ahmednagar International Short Film Festival, 2015
- Best Editor Award at 1st Ahmednagar International Short Film Festival, 2015
