= Jupitora Bhuyan =

Indian actress and politician

- Born: Guwahati, Assam, India
- Occupations: Actress; Politician
- Years active: 2003–present
- Political party: Trinamool Congress (2023–present)

Jupitora Bhuyan is an Indian actress and politician works in the Assamese films. She worked in a few Assamese films along with VCD films and telefilms. She is also part of Assamese mobile theatre industry debut by playing lead female roles in Kohinoor Theatre. She is especially known for playing extraordinary character with a powerful appearance.

== Early life ==
Jupitora was born in Guwahati, the capital city of Assam. She did her schooling at Tarini Charan Girls School in Guwahati and later joined Handique Girls College to study arts.

== Acting career ==
In an interview, she said that she made her acting debut through a comminsoned program in Doordarshan Guwahati at around 2003.

Bhuyan joined the Assamese film industry in the year 2005 with Sibanan Baruah's movie Hiyar Dapunot Tumare Sobi with Ravi Sarma and Barsha Rani Bishaya. She has also acted in various VCD films like Unmona Mon, Jon Tora etc.

=== Tumi Jodi Kuwa ===
(Assamese: তুমি যদি কোৱা, romanized: Tumi Jodi Kuwa) is an Assamese musical, romantic drama film directed, dialogue and scriptwritten by Simple Gogoi and produced by Teron Jitumoni under the banner of L.N. Films. Cast list of the film are Prasenjit Borah, Bhuyan, Munmi Kalita, Rupam Sharma, Prince, Bhaskar Ranjan, Ranjan Dutta, Krishna. The makeup is done by Akash Gogoi, Subhash and Vijayeta. The film's story is given by Gautam Rabha. The film was released on 14 June 2013.

=== Ajeyo ===
(Assamese: অজেয়, English: Invincible) is a 2014 Assamese language drama film directed by Jahnu Barua; based on the Sahitya Akademi Award winner 1997 Assamese novel Ashirbador Rong written by Arun Sharma and adapted as screenplay by the director himself. It was produced by Shankar Lal Goenka and stars Rupam Chetia and Jupitora Bhuyan in the lead roles. The film was released on 3 January 2014.

Ajeyo depicts the struggles of an honest, ideal revolutionary youth Gajen Keot who fought against the social evils in rural Assam during the freedom movement in India. She played a Muslim character in the movie.

=== Mobile Theater ===
Bhuyan played lead female roles in Kohinoor Theatre against Jatin Bora in 2008. Later she has been part of various mobile theatre groups like Rajashree Theatre, Chiranjeeb Theatre, Rajtilak Theatre etc.

== Political career ==
On 17 February 2023, Bhuyan joined the Trinamool Congress at the party headquarters in Guwahati.

== Filmography ==
=== Film ===
Year	Title	Role	Notes
2003	Chakrabehu		
2005	Hiyar Dapunot Tumar Sobi	Liza	
2006	Joon Tora		
2006	Unmona Mon		VCD Film
2007	Uroniya Mon		VCD Film
2011	Tomar Khabar	Anjana	
2013	Tumi Jodi Kuwa	Sanjana	
2014	Ajeyo	Hasina	
2017	Othello	Tina	

=== Television ===
- Meghranjani
- Pratigya
- Chameli Memsaab
- Akaxor Thikona Bisari
- Sahu Buwari (episodic)
- Sinaki Xuhuri (episodic)
- Nibir Mayare

== Awards and nominations ==
Awards
Award	Date	Category	Recipients and nominees	Result
Prag Cine Award	22 March 2014	Best Actor Female	Jupitora Bhuyan	Nominated
