= Bhakla =

2006 Indian film

- Directed by: Dinesh Patel
- Story by: Madan Sharma & Prem Simon
- Starring: Dhriti Pati Sarkar
- Edited by: Dilip Darak
- Music by: Kalyan Sen
- Release date: 5 May 2006
- Running time: 150 minutes
- Country: India
- Language: Chhattisgarhi

Bhakla is an Indian Chhattisgarhi-language film, released on 5 May 2006. This film is notable because the Lata Mangeshkar sang a song in it, which was her first and only Chhattisgarhi song. The movie was directed by Dinesh Patel and written by Madan Sharma. The composer for his movie is Kalyan Sen, who is a notable music director in Chhattisgarh. This movies premiere attended by that time Chhattisgarh's governor Krishna Mohan Seth

The film's title character, an innocent village boy, was played by Dhriti Pati Sarkar.

== Cast ==
- Dhiriti Pati Sarkar
- Dipak
- Dharmendra Chaubey
- Neetu Singh
- Anu Sharma
- Barkha
- Kalyan Sen
- Arvind Mishra
- Ashok Srivastav
- Narendra Kabara
- Mukesh Vaishnav
- Rajendra Kapoor
- Suresh Banafar
- Anil Sharma
- Kaushal Upadhyay
- Laxmi Sharma
- Upasana Vaishnava
- Inderjit Kaur
- Meenakshi
- Neha Rajput
- Priya Sharma
- Bhitu Bhelchand
- Suleiman
- Kamal
- Santosh
- Shiv Tamrakar
- Mahesh
- Madan Sharma

== Accolades ==
Award List
Award	Name	Film Festival
Best Film	Dinesh Patel	Gully International Film Festivals
Best Director	Dinesh Patel	Reels International Film Festival
Best Director	Dinesh Patel	Roshani International Film Festival
Best Costume	Dinesh Patel	Silver Screen Short Film Award
Best Actor	Dhriti Pati Sarkar	Ashoka International Film Festival
Best Actor	Dhriti Pati Sarkar	Ideal International Film Festival
Best Actor	Dhriti Pati Sarkar	Paradise International Film Festival
