= Luitok Bhetibo Kune =

- Directed by: Prabin Bora
- Produced by: Prabin Bora and Samrat Bora
- Cinematography: Naba Kumar Das; Benu Neog
- Edited by: P. Chandrababu
- Music by: Dipak Sarma; Abani Ranjan Pathak
- Release date: 1 March 2013
- Country: India
- Language: Assamese

Luitok Bhetibo Kune is a 2013 Indian Assamese drama film directed by Prabin Bora, with his own screenplay and produced along with Samrat Bora under the banner of Bistirna Films. The story, script and dialogues of 'Luitok Bhetibo Kune' are by Prabin Bora himself. After Parinam (1974), 'Angikar' (1985) and 'Prem Bhora Chakolu' (2003) Luitok Bhetibo Kune is the fourth film directed by Prabin Bora.

== Cast ==
- Biplab Bora
- Dr. Gunin Basumatary
- Padum Gogoi
- Aparajita Dutta
- Rita Bora
- Abhijit Mazumdar
- Biman Barua
- Padum Nath
- Raktim Dutta
- Deben Sarma
- Pinki Bhattacharjya
- Ranjan Bora (Dadu)
- Milan Kakati
- Sailen Hazarika
- Bhupen Bhuyan
- Manuranjan Dev Sarma
- Nishanta Sarma
- Ramen Talukdar
- Nivedita Barua Saikia
- Vivek Lekharu
- Brishti Naina Das
- Alpana Talukdar Sarma
- Sanjiv Borthakur
- Olympic Saikia
- child artistes Dibyashree Saikia
- Srijan Saikia

== Soundtrack ==
Music is scored by the renowned flautist Dipak Sarma. Background music is scored by Abani Ranjan Pathak. The lyrics are written by Prabin Bora and Bikash Barua. The songs are rendered by Parinita, Samrat Bora, Dibyajyoti Barua, Dr. Gunin Basumatary, Dil Mohammed and others.
