= Rodor Sithi =

- Theatrical release poster
- Directed by: Baharul Islam
- Written by: Baharul Islam
- Produced by: Ikramul Majid
- Starring: Zubeen Garg; Papon; Bhagirathi; Adil Hussain
- Cinematography: Pradip Daimari
- Edited by: Kaju
- Music by: Zubeen Garg
- Production company: Alternative Cinematics
- Release date: 7 November 2014
- Running time: 125 min
- Country: India
- Language: Assamese

Rodor Sithi (English: Scarecrow, literal translation Sunshine in a Letter) is a 2014 Indian Assamese language musical drama film directed by Baharul Islam. It is based on a play titled Beyond the Obvious, written by the director. The film is produced by Ikramul Majid under the banner of Alternative Cinematics and stars Zubeen Garg, Papon, Bhagirathi and Adil Hussain in the lead roles.

== Cast ==
- Bhagirathi
- Adil Hussain
- Zubeen Garg
- Papon
- Jyoti Narayan Nath
- Nani Borpujari
- Barkha Bahar
- Pallabi Phukan
- Sasanka Samir
- Fairy Priya Ahmed
- Momi Borah

== Soundtrack ==
Rodor Sithi

Soundtrack album by Zubeen Garg
- Released: 25 December 2013
- Recorded: 2013
- Genre: Feature film soundtrack
- Length: 31:43
- Language: Assamese
- Label: Times Music

Zubeen Garg chronology
Mon Jaai (2008)	Rodor Sithi (2013)	Gaane Ki Aane (2015)

The music of the film is composed by Zubeen Garg with vocals by Papon and Garg. The album contains 6 tracks.

Tracklist
No.	Title	Lyrics	Artist(s)	Length
1.	"Rodor Sithi"	Sasanka Samir	Zubeen Garg	3:48
2.	"Akashe Diya"	Sasanka Samir	Zubeen Garg	5:34
3.	"Protidine"	Diganta Bharati	Zubeen Garg	6:40
4.	"Endhare"	Hiren Bhattacharyya	Zubeen Garg	4:56
5.	"Protidine" (Version 2)	Diganta Bharati	Papon	6:38
6.	"Endhare" (LOFI)	Hiren Bhattacharyya	Papon	4:56
Total length:				31:43
