= Hosa Prem =

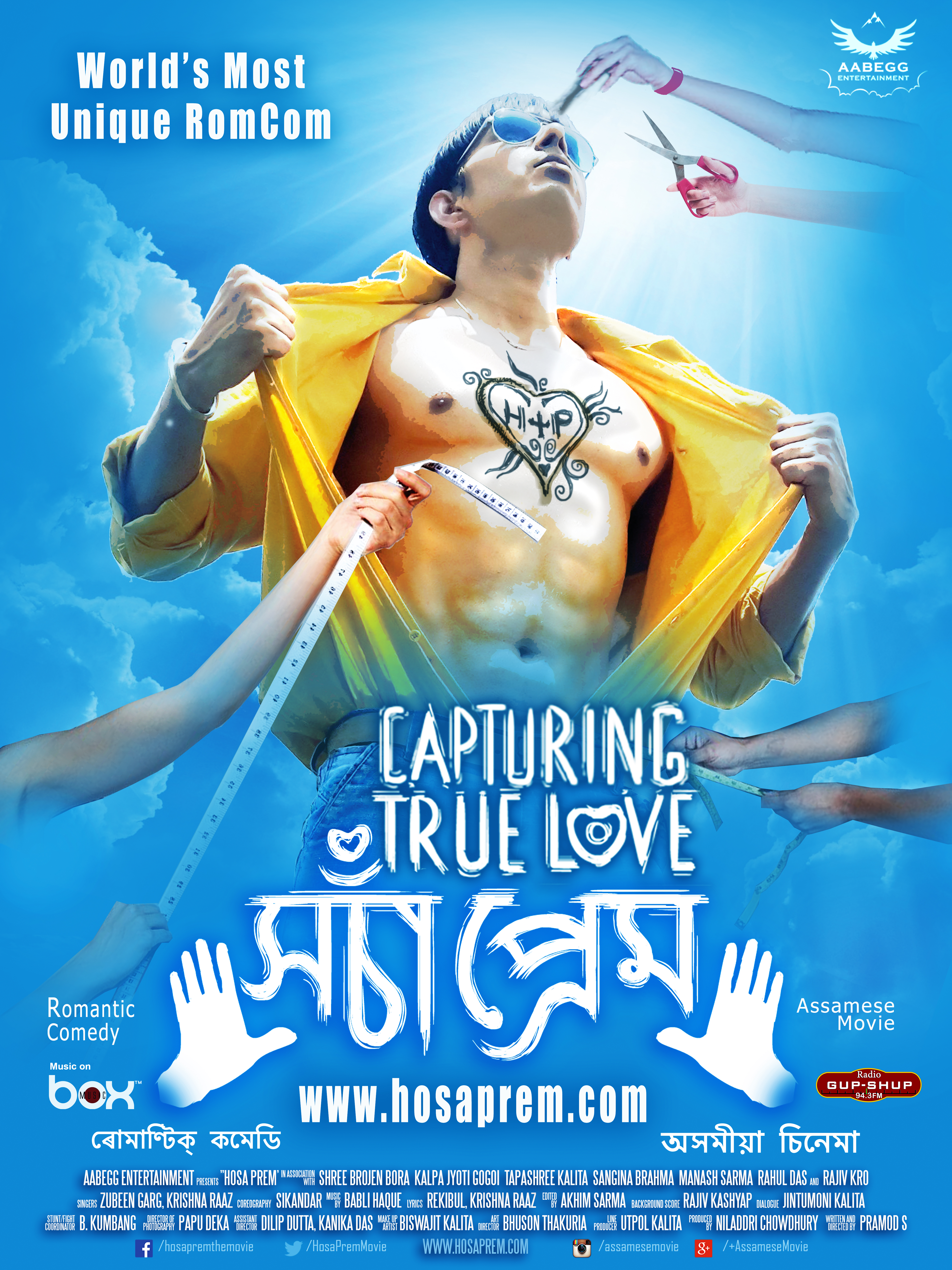
- Directed by: Pramod Sahoo
- Story by: Pramod Sahoo
- Produced by: Aabegg Entertainment Pvt Ltd
- Starring: Shree Brojen Bora; Kalpa Jyoti Gogoi; Tapashree Kalita; Manas Sarma; Rajiv Kro
- Cinematography: Papu Deka
- Music by: Babli Haque
- Release date: 5 January 2018
- Running time: 135 minutes
- Country: India
- Language: Assamese

Hosa Prem (English: Capturing True Love) is an Assamese language romantic comedy film by Pramod Sahoo released on 5 January 2018. The film is written by Pramod Sahoo and produced by Aabegg Entertainment Pvt Ltd. It stars Shree Brojen Bora, Kalpa Jyoti Gogoi and Tapashree Kalita in lead roles.

== Cast ==
- Shree Brojen Bora as Major Mahaaan
- Kalpa Jyoti Gogoi as Hero
- Tapashree Kalita as Heroine
- Manas Sarma as Camera Das
- Rajiv Kro as Sikai Senapati
- Sangina Brahma as Amlokhi
- Raj Bidya as Fiancée
- Syamalima Das as B.B.C
- Safikul Haque as Zubeen Rahman
- Rahul das (khaplang kai) as lollipop
- Nandita Boruah as chewing gum
- Adrika P.S as Maina

== Production ==
=== Development ===
The story development of Assamese film 'Hosa Prem' started in January 2016. The story discussion took place at Geeta Mandir Namghar, Guwahati, Assam, India where the story team sat together for several weeks until the first draft was ready for review.

=== Filming ===
Muhurat of the film took place at Jyoti Chitraban Film Studio, Assam, India on 13 February 2017. Filming began on 15 February 2017 at Jyoti Chitraban Film Studio, and other action was shot in Guwahati city in the middle of heavy traffic like a guerrilla filmmaking technique, finishing in one place and moving rapidly to another, aiming to shoot as many scenes as possible each day. A Bollywood action director and a cable group were brought in from Mumbai, India to shoot various action sequences. For the first time in Assamese cinema all seven states of North East India are represented in one movie along with dialogues in all seven languages of Arunachal Pradesh, Assam, Manipur, Meghalaya, Mizoram, Nagaland and Tripura.

== Music ==
=== Score ===
Background score of the film is composed by Rajiv Kashyap.

=== Soundtrack ===
The soundtrack is composed by Babli Haque and features playback singer Zubeen Garg and Krishna Raaz.

=== Lyrics ===
Lyrics for the title song of the film is penned down by Krishna Raaz and Disco song is written and composed by Rekibul Hassan.

=== Track listing ===
It is mentioned that Hosa Prem Disco song is the world's first song created (almost) entirely out of Assamese movie names.

Track listing
No.	Title	Lyrics	Music	Singer(s)	Length
1.	"Hosa Prem (Title Song)"	Krishna Raaz	Babli Haque	Krishna Raaz	3:57
2.	"Hosa Prem Disco song"	Rekibul Hassan	Babli Haque	Zubeen Garg & Ananya Mukharjee	4:57
Total length:					8:54
