= Tumi Jodi Kuwa =

2013 film by Simple Gogoi

- Directed by: Simple Gogoi
- Written by: Simple Gogoi
- Produced by: LN Films
- Starring: Prasenjit Borah; Jupitora Bhuyan; Munmi Kalita; Rupam Sharma; Prince; Bhaskar Ranjan Nath; Ranjan Dutta; Krishna; Mahika Sharma
- Music by: Chandan Bezbarua
- Release date: 14 June 2013
- Running time: 150 min.
- Country: India
- Language: Assamese

Tumi Jodi Kuwa is an Assamese musical, romantic drama film directed, dialogue and scriptwritten by Simple Gogoi and produced by Teron Jitumoni under the banner of L.N. Films. Cast list of the film are Prasenjit Borah, Jupitora Bhuyan, Munmi Kalita, Mahika Sharma, Rupam Sharma, Prince, Bhaskar Ranjan, Ranjan Dutta, Krishna. The makeup is done by Akash Gogoi, Subhash and Vijayeta. The film's story is given by Gautam Rabha. The film was released on 14 June 2013. The title of the film was taken from Zubeen's song of the same name.

== Plot ==
The movie is centered around the young generation. The story is about a group of friends who have a music band and how they try to make it big in the field, in turn facing the hurdles and overcoming them.

== Soundtrack ==
The music of the film is scored by Chandan Bezbarua. The songs were sung by Zubeen Garg, Ananya, Dikshu, Stutima Basistha.

Tracklist
No.	Title	Singer(s)	Length
1.	"Mon Aakakhi Rangore"	Zubeen, Nabanita	5:24
2.	"Nila Nila Nila"	Dikshu, Nabanita	4:54
3.	"Tumi Jodi Kuwa"	Dikshu, Ananya	5:20
4.	"Dusokute Sokuthoi"	Dikshu, Ananya	4:33
5.	"Eetup Dutup Kori"	Dikshu, Ashsh	5:57
6.	"Kiyonu Hothate"	Dikshu	5:04
Total length:			31:12

== Accolades ==
Year	Award	Category	Nominee	Result
2014	Prag Cine Awards	Best Choreography	Uday Shankar	Nominated
2014	Filmfare Awards East	Filmfare Award for Best Actor Male – Assamese	Prosenjit Borah	Nominated
