= Sringkhal =

- Directed by: Prabin Hazarika
- Based on: Sringkhal by Bhabendra Nath Saikia
- Produced by: ASFFDC; Silverline Production
- Starring: Jaya Seal Ghosh; Adil Hussain; Badal Das; Saurabh Hazarika
- Cinematography: Sidhartha Barua
- Edited by: Niranjan Gogoi
- Music by: Manash Hazarika
- Release date: 17 October 2014
- Running time: 106 minutes
- Country: India
- Language: Assamese

Sringkhal (The Quiver) is a 2014 Indian Assamese drama film directed by Prabin Hazarika, based on an Assamese short story by Dr. Bhabendra Nath Saikia of the same name. The film was co-produced by Assam State Film (Finance & Development) Corporation Limited and Silverline Production, and stars Adil Hussain and Jaya Seal Ghosh in the lead roles. The film opened in limited theaters of Assam on 17 October 2014.

Jaya Seal Ghosh and Badal Das respectively won the Best Actor Female and Best Supporting Actor Male for their performance in this film in Prag Cine Awards 2014.

== Plot ==
The plot is based against a rural backdrop. Dayaram, an old man, in the hope to see a family flowering, had allowed Nilakanta to settle down. Kalidas, a friend of Nilakanta, who had fallen for Ambika had informed Nilakanta that cupid had indeed struck. When Nilakanta informs Kalidas that he will soon be marrying Ambika, the gentleman in Kalidas ensures that he does not complicate matters and moves away on business.

But after her husband passes away, Ambika, struggles for survival and brings up her children and an infant doing the odd menial work in the village. Once, on her way back home, she captures timid four pigeons which make Ambika shed some of her timidity. Kalidas returns after long years to frequently spend long hours in Dayaram's courtyard. Dayaram dreams that Ambika hunger ends soon. He wants to play cupid this time. Ambika too is aware of Dayaram's intentions. One day when Kalidas asks "Were you aware that my mother had gone over to your place to scout for you as my bride?" Ambika is dumb struck. Dayaram weaves Ambika baskets to take the pigeons to the market. He ensures Kalidas accompanies her. Dusk falls. The pigeons remain unsold. Ambika does not disagree to Kalidas's proposal to buy the pigeons for a meal in her household. The flickers of the market lamps light up her face.

== Cast ==
- Jaya Seal Ghosh as Ambika
- Adil Hussain as Kalidas
- Badal Das as Dayaram
- Saurav Hazarika as Nilakanta
- Prativa Choudhury
- Nirmali Sarma
- Dhiraj Das
- Bhanu Deka
- Ashim Nath
- Divyam Seal
- Rodali Bora
