= Assam State Film (Finance and Development) Corporation Ltd. =

- Abbreviation: ASFFDC
- Formation: 4 September 1974
- Legal status: Active
- Purpose: Promotion of Cinema of Assam
- Headquarters: Panjabari, Guwahati, Assam
- Region served: India
- Owner: Government of Assam
- Key people: Chairperson: Shri Simanta Shekhar; Vice Chairman: Dr Alekhya Baruah
- Website: filmfinance.assam.gov.in

Assam State Film (Finance and Development) Corporation Ltd. (ASFFDC) is an organization undertaken by Government of Assam which aims in developing and promoting the legacy of Assamese cinema. It was incorporated on 4 September 1974 under the Companies Act, 1956 by the Government of Assam.

ASFFDC co-produced several Assamese films in recent years in joined venture with other production houses which includes Jahnu Barua's Baandhon (2012), Rajni Basumatary's Raag (2014) among others.

== Work ==
ASFFDC provides financial assistance and logistics to Assamese filmmakers by advancing loans, subsidies, grants etc. or by extending financial assistance in any other manner. It also opened the first film archive and film museum North East India, Jonakee.

ASFFDC started producing Assamese films in 2000 with its first release Nisiddha Nadi. However its second production was released in 2012, after a gap of 12 years. Since then it has been actively co-producing several Assamese films.

== Produced Films ==
=== Released Films ===
Year	Title	Co-producer	Director
2000	Nisiddha Nadi	-	Bidyut Chakraborty
2012	Baandhon	-	Jahnu Barua
2014	Raag	Manna Films	Rajni Basumatary
2014	Paani	JD Films	Jadumoni Dutta
2014	Sringkhal	Silverline Production	Prabin Hazarika
2014	TRP... aru	JR Enterprises	Mridul Gupta
2016	Saat Nomboror Sandhanat	-	Abdul Majid
2016	Dikchow Banat Palaax	Canvascope	Sanjib Sabhapandit
2017	Tumi Aahibane	Prerana Creations	Prerana Barbarooah
2017	Sonar Baran Pakhi	BB Entertainment Pvt. Ltd	Bobby Sarma Baruah
