= Gaane Ki Aane =

- Directed by: Rajesh Jashpal
- Written by: Rajesh Jashpal
- Screenplay by: Rajesh Jashpal; Ibson Lal Barua
- Produced by: Gautam Chakrabortty; Sunil Gogoi; Rajesh Jashpal
- Starring: Zubeen Garg; Parineeta Borthakur; Rimpi Das; Rajesh Jashpal
- Cinematography: Pradip Daimari
- Music by: Zubeen Garg
- Distributed by: Raga Films
- Release date: 14 October 2016
- Running time: 143 min
- Country: India
- Language: Assamese
- Box office: est. ₹1.5 crore

Gaane Ki Aane is a 2016 Indian Assamese language musical romance film directed by Rajesh Jashpal. It stars Zubeen Garg and Parineeta Borthakur in the lead roles.

== Synopsis ==
The story is about a musical superstar Nilabh Jonak Baruah, played by Zubeen Garg, and his love and challenges.

== Cast ==
- Zubeen Garg as Nilabh Jonak Baruah
- Parineeta Borthakur as Madhumita
- Rimpi Das as Rani
- Hiranya Deka as Hiru 'HD' Das
- Rajesh Jashpal as Rani's brother
- Rina Bora as Nilabh's grandmother
- Nipon Goswami as Mr. Benerjee

== Soundtrack ==
Gaane Ki Aane

Soundtrack album by Zubeen Garg
- Released: 13 March 2015 (Audio CD); 25 March 2015 (Digital)
- Recorded: 2014–2015
- Genre: Feature film soundtrack
- Language: Assamese
- Label: Times Music

Zubeen Garg chronology
Rodor Sithi (2013)	Gaane Ki Aane (2015)	Hamari Adhuri Kahani (2015)

The music of Gaane Ki Aane was composed by Zubeen Garg. Lyrics are by Zubeen Garg, Sasanka Samir and Hiren Bhattacharya. Apart from Zubeen Garg singers like Zublee, Parineeta, Mahalaxmi, Anindita & Madhusmita have rendered their voices in the beautiful tracks.

Tracklist
No.	Title	Lyrics	Artist(s)	Length
1.	"Janu Janu"	Zubeen Garg	Zubeen Garg, Parineeta Borthakur	5:14
2.	"Gaanore Potharote"	Sasanka Samir	Zubeen Garg	4:19
3.	"Xaliki Puwar"	Zubeen Garg	Mahalakshmi Iyer	4:58
4.	"Dancing Tonight"	Zubeen Garg	Zubeen Garg, Anindita Paul	5:30
5.	"Aahu Nahu"	Zubeen Garg	Madhusmita Borthakur	5:30
6.	"Tumi Rodali"	Zubeen Garg	Zublee	4:09
7.	"Gaane Ki Aane (Title Track)"	Hiren Bhattacharyya	Zubeen Garg, Parineeta Borthakur	5:34
