= Raag (film) =

2014 Assamese-language film by Rajni Basumatary

- Theatrical release poster of Raag
- Directed by: Rajni Basumatary
- Written by: Rajni Basumatary
- Screenplay by: Rajni Basumatary
- Produced by: ASFFDC; Manna Films
- Starring: Adil Hussain; Zerifa Wahid; Kenny Basumatary; Kopil Bora
- Cinematography: Ajayan Vincent
- Edited by: Rupam Kalita
- Music by: Avinash Baghel
- Production company: Manna Films
- Release date: 7 February 2014
- Country: India
- Language: Assamese
- Box office: est. ₹1 crore

Raag (transl. The Rhythm of Love) is a 2014 Indian Assamese-language drama film, starring Adil Hussain and Zerifa Wahid in the lead roles. The film was directed by Rajni Basumatary and produced by Assam State Film (Finance & Development) Corporation Limited in association with Manna Films. The film was initially released on 7 February 2014 in the state of Assam and later on 7 March 2014 in selected theaters across rest of India via PVR Director's Rare.

== Plot ==
Raag is set in Delhi where Radhika, a Hindustani singer, lives with her businessman husband Alok. They first met during one of Radhika's musical performances in Guwahati several years ago. Despite their different philosophies of life they fall in love with each other and get married. Due to Alok's career change, they later relocate to Delhi. Even after seven years of marriage Alok is still not ready to become a father. He starts to ignore Radhika as an individual and as an artiste. Her music that apparently made him fall in love with her has now become unappealing.

Radhika meets her neighbour Iqbal, a painter. Soon they become friends. Surajeet Sahay, whose terrace Iqbal has been using as his shelter and his studio for last ten years, wants Iqbal to vacate the place. The flat was actually Iqbal's. He had to sell it to Sahay as Iqbal could not arrange money to send off his wife, Natalie (Natasha Mago), and daughter, Noor, to Prague. Iqbal had stayed back on the terrace of the flat, as he didn't want to stay away from the place that holds memories of his wife and daughter, Noor. Now Surajeet Sahay wants to sell off the flat and migrate to Canada. Radhika arranges an exhibition of Iqbal's painting to help him buy the house back. But she fails at that. Just then Partho, her childhood singer friend reappears in her life. He was secretly in love with Radhika but had let her go her way when he found out that she married Alok. With his great marketing and PR skills, Partho helps Radhika to organise another exhibition of Iqbal's painting, which deservedly turns out to be a smashing hit. Iqbal gets his house back. Partho goes back to Guwahati.

Alok, on the other hand, had sex without precautions and impregnates his colleague Nandini during one of their business trips outside Delhi. Radhika came to know about it. But they both (Alok and Nandini) claim that it was just an accident and that there is no emotional involvement from either side. It is a decisive moment for Radhika to choose amongst Alok, Iqbal and Partho. The script does not show the decision Radhika made and leaves it open for interpretations. Flashforwarding to five years, the film ends with Radhika and Partho singing jugalbandi on a performance stage and Iqbal and a four-year-old girl sitting among the audience and enjoying the jugalbandi.

== Cast ==
- Adil Hussain as Iqbal
- Zerifa Wahid as Radhika
- Kenny Basumatary as Alok
- Kopil Bora as Partho
- Natasha Mago as Natalie
- Saumya Agarwal as Nandini
- Rajni Basumatary as Socialite (cameo role)

== Production ==
Raag is the directorial debut of Rajni Basumatary, who had earlier written and produced the critically acclaimed Assamese film Anurag. In an interview with The Times of India, Basumatary said that she likes to explore the complexity of human situations and that human emotions are universal, no matter where one is from. The entire film was shot in various locations in Delhi and Assam. The music of the film was scored by Chhattisgarhi musician Avinash Baghel. The music is highly influenced by Hindustani classical music. The soundtrack of the film was released on 15 January 2014 and contains 5 songs.

== Release ==
The film was first released on 7 February 2014 in the Indian state of Assam, a month ahead of all India release. Later, Raag was released in selected theaters across rest of India on 7 March 2014 via PVR Director's Rare.

=== Controversy ===
Despite performing quite well in the box office, Raag was removed after only one week run in the theaters of Assam allegedly by the distributors of Yash Raj Films to make room for their big budget Hindi film Gunday. This led to a controversy against Bollywood movies generally trying to suppress regional films.

== Awards ==
Raag won three awards at the Prag Cine Awards 2014: Best Actor Male (for Adil Hussain), Best Art Direction (for Deepti Chawla and Archana Malhotra), and Best Makeup (for Akash Gogoi). It was nominated in 9 categories: Best Film, Best Director, Best Screenplay, Best Actor Female, Best Supporting Actor Male, Best Music Direction, Best Lyrics, Best Playback Singer Female, and Best Costume Design.
