= Simple Gogoi =

Indian film director (born 1976)

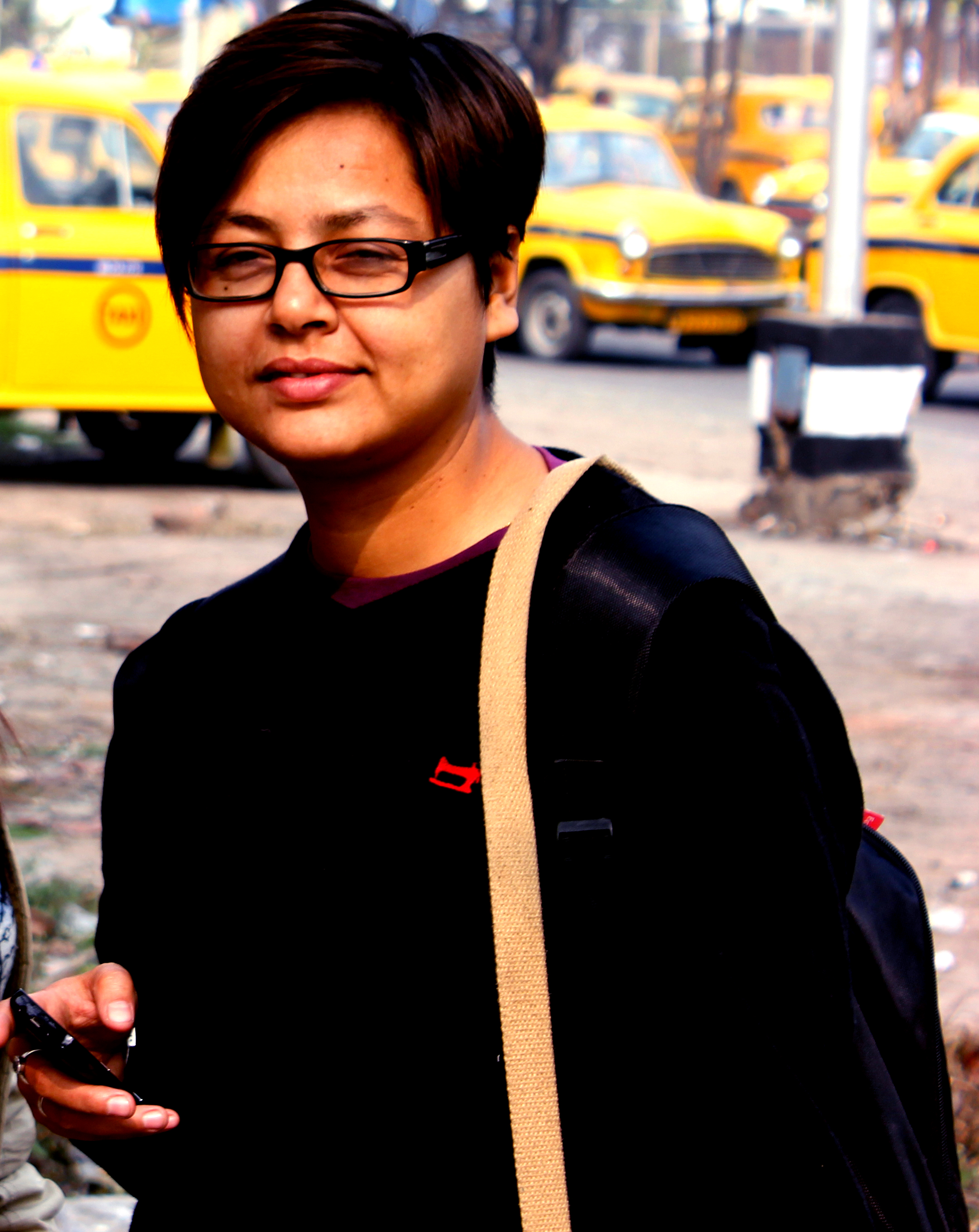
- Simple Gogoi 2013
- Born: Simple Gogoi; 1 August 1976 (age 50); Jorhat, India
- Occupations: Director, Filmmaker, Script Writer
- Years active: 2001–present
- Organisation: DY365
- Notable work: Aakakh (Mega Assamese Serial), Priyanka(Assamese Movie), Anurag Tumar Babey(TV Serial), Tumi Jodi Kuwa (Assamese Movie), Ee Jak Sopun Jen Borokhun (Mega Assamese Serial)
- Relatives: Late Sarbeswar Gogoi (Father), Late Purnima Gogoi (Mother), Abhilash Gogoi (Brother), Panchamita Gogoi (Sister)

Simple Gogoi (born 1 August 1976) is a director from Assam, India. Her first movie is Tumi Jodi Kua and later she worked on mega serials, Ad Films and more than hundred music videos.

== Early life ==
Simple was born in Jorhat, Assam. She is the second child of Late Sarbeswar Gogoi and Late Purnima Gogoi. She graduated from Jagannath Barooah College, Jorhat. In 1998 she moved to Russia and took her lessons on advertising, editing, direction at Moscow State University of Culture and Arts. She also took her lessons on language at Peoples' Friendship University of Russia. After returning from Russia on 2001 she assisted Shivam Nair for TV serial Rooh on Zee TV and worked on house call World of Entertainment. She assisted Manas Adhikari for two years in Guwahati. Simple came into Assamese Film Industry in late 2002.

== Personal life ==
Simple currently lives in Guwahati, Assam with her younger sister Panchamita Gogoi, elder brother Abhilash Gogoi, Sister-in-law Rupjyoti Dutta and with her cousins.

== Career ==
Simple has worked in a number of Assamese films / TV Serials as Director, Script Writer, Screenplay. Those are Aakakh (Mega Assamese Serial), Priyanka (Assamese Movie), Anurag Tumar Babey (TV Serial). She worked as Creative Concept Director from June 2013 to October 2014 at DY365 News Channel's Entertainment Channel Jonack.

Tumi Jodi Kuwa (তুমি যদি কোৱা) is an Assamese musical, romantic drama film directed, dialogue and script written by Simple Gogoi and produced by Teron Jitumoni under the banner of L.N. Films. The film was released on 14 June 2013.

== Filmography ==
- Tumi Jodi Kuwa (2013)
- Aakakh (Assamese mega serial)
- Priyanka (Assamese film)
- Anurag Tumar Babey (TV serial)
