= Baandhon =

- The PVR release poster of Baandhon
- Directed by: Jahnu Barua
- Written by: Jahnu Barua
- Produced by: ASFFDC
- Starring: Bishnu Kharghoria; Bina Patangia; Jatin Bora; Zerifa Wahid
- Cinematography: Suman Duwarah
- Edited by: Cheragh Todiwala
- Music by: Dhrubajyoti Phukan
- Release dates: 26 October 2012 (Assam); 5 July 2013 (Pan India)
- Running time: 110 minutes
- Country: India
- Language: Assamese

Baandhon (English: Waves of Silence) is a 2012 Assamese language drama film, starring Bishnu Kharghoria and Bina Patangia in the lead roles. The film was directed by Jahnu Barua and produced by Assam State Film (Finance & Development) Corporation Limited. The film was initially released on 26 October 2012 in the state of Assam and later on 5 July 2013 in selected PVR theaters across rest of India.

The film focuses on an elderly couple, Dandeswar and Hkawni, who arrive in Mumbai in search of their missing grandson after 26/11 2008 terror attack. The film won the Best Feature Film in Assamese award in the 60th National Film Awards and also won the Best Film award in the Indian Films Competition at the Bengaluru International Film Festival for the year 2012.

== Plot ==
Baandhon is set mostly in Guwahati, before the climax it shifts to Mumbai. It tells the story of 73 years old couple – Dandeswar (Bishnu Kharghoria) and Hkawni (Bina Patangia), who live outskirts of Guwahati, grudgingly nudging each other for a divorce. They approach one of their ex-tenants, now a family friend, a successful local lawyer Jatin (Jatin Bora) to file the divorce petition. While Jatin is aware that this is just a passing phase and the couple will soon patch up. He advises the couple to live separately in the two different bedrooms of their bungalow. The couple had lost their only son and daughter-in-law in an accident some years ago and their grandson, Pona, is the only living kin. He is currently studying in IIT Bombay. However, things take an unprecedented turn when Pona disconnects a call from Dandeswar in the middle of a conversation. The subsequent tries to contact him fails. It all took place at the same time with the 26/11 2008 terror attack. The couple arrives in Mumbai in search of their missing grandson.

== Cast ==
- Bishnu Kharghoria as Dandeswar Baruah
- Bina Patangia as Hkawni Baruah
- Jatin Bora as Jatin Bora
- Zerifa Wahid as Ranjana Bora
- Abatush Bhuyan
- Angshuman Bhuyan

== Music ==
There are no songs in the film except background music. Background music director is Dhrubajyoti Phukan.

== Awards and honours ==
The film opened the feature film Section of Indian Panorama at the 43rd International Film Festival of India. It was also screened at the International Film Festival of Kerala Film Festival and the Mumbai Film Festival in the year 2012.

The film was awarded as best film in the Indian Films Competition held at the Bengaluru International Film Festival for the year 2012. It concluded a plaque and a cash prize of Rs 4 lakhs. Finally it won the 60th National Film Awards for Best Feature Film in Assamese.

== See also ==
- Jollywood
