= Adil Hussain =

Indian film actor (born 1963)

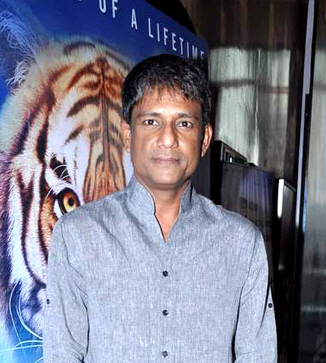
- Hussain at Life of Pi press meet
- Born: 5 October 1963 (age 63); Goalpara, Assam, India
- Education: B. Borooah College; National School of Drama; Drama Studio London
- Occupation: Actor
- Years active: 1986–present
- Known for: Life of Pi, Jasoos Vijay

Khandkar Mohammad Adil Hussain (Note: Assamese pronunciation: [adil ɦusɛin].) (Assamese pronunciation: [adil ɦusɛin]; born 5 October 1963) is an Indian actor who is known for his work in several Indian independent and mainstream film productions, as well as international cinema, in films such as The Reluctant Fundamentalist and Life of Pi (both 2012). He received National Film Awards (Special Jury) at the 64th National Film Awards for Hotel Salvation and Maj Rati Keteki.

He has starred in English, Hindi, Assamese, Bengali, Tamil, Marathi, Malayalam, Norwegian and French films.

== Early life and education ==
Born in an Assamese Muslim family in Goalpara, Assam on 5 October 1963, where his father was the headmaster of a high secondary school, Hussain was the youngest of seven children. His ancestors had traditionally been appointed as private tutors, known as Khandkar, to the Mughal Emperors. In an interview he described his multiethnic background, as his maternal grandfather was Iraqi while his maternal grandmother had Assamese, English and Italian roots.

Hussain acted in school plays. He left home at age 18 to study philosophy at B. Borooah College, Guwahati, he started acting in college plays and performing as a stand-up comedian.

He also mimicked popular Bollywood actors in between the performances of a local stand-up comedian group, the Bhaya Mama Group. He worked as a stand-up comedian for six years, joined a mobile theatre and also did some local cinema, before moving to Delhi, where he studied at National School of Drama (1990–1993).

He also studied at the Drama Studio London on a Charles Wallace India Trust Scholarship.

== Career ==
After his return to India in 1994, Hussain joined the mobile 'Hengul Theater' in Assam, where he worked for three years, before moving to Delhi. He started his stage career in Delhi, though he continued training under Khalid Tyabji. After Tyabji he trained with Swapan Bose at Sri Aurobindo Ashram, Pondicherry, before starting training with Dilip Shankar in Delhi.

As an actor, he first received acclaim in Othello: A Play in Black and White (1999), which was awarded the Edinburgh Fringe First, and later Goodbye Desdemona also directed by Roysten Abel. He remained the artistic director and Trainer of the Society for Artists and Performers in Hampi from 2004 to 2007, and a visiting faculty at Royal Conservatory of Performing Arts, The Hague. He is also a visiting faculty at his alma mater, the National School of Drama.

In 2004, he made his Bengali film debut along with Soha Ali Khan in the period drama Iti Srikanta, where he played the lead role.

On television, he appeared in the lead role, in the detective series Jasoos Vijay (2002–2003), produced by BBC World Service Trust.

Though he had appeared in a few Assamese films, did a small roles in Vishal Bhardwaj's Kaminey and Sona Jain's For Real, it was his role in Abhishek Chaubey's Ishqiya (2010) that got him attention in Bollywood, though his first major role was in Saif Ali Khan-Kareena Kapoor Khan starrer Agent Vinod released in early 2012. In the same year, he appeared in Italian director Italo Spinelli's Gangor, Mira Nair's The Reluctant Fundamentalist, and Ang Lee's Life of Pi.

He next appeared alongside Sridevi in the comedy drama English Vinglish (2012), and also received critical acclaim for his role in Lessons in Forgetting at the New Jersey Independent South Asian Cine Fest. After these he acted in Aditya Bhattacharya's Bombay Most Wanted and Partho Sen-Gupta's Sunrise.

His next role as Inspector K. N. Singh was in the Ranveer Singh-Sonakshi Sinha Lootera under Vikramaditya Motwane's direction. This followed with Amit Vats' comedy Boyss Toh Boyss Hain, the story of four young men with similar problems in life, who eventually find their way to true love.

Hussain opened 2014 with the Assamese film Raag: The Rhythm of Love playing Iqbal, which marked his first Assamese film in a lead role. Sringkhal and Rodor Sithi were his other Assamese releases in the year. He was also seen in Hindi films like Kaanchi: The Unbreakable as a CBI officer, The Xposé as Rajan starring Himesh Reshammiya in the lead, and Tigers as Bilal starring Emraan Hashmi. Tigers, based on a real-life story about a salesman, was screened at the 2014 Toronto International Film Festival. His first lead role in a Hindi film came with the drama Zed Plus as Aslam Puncturewala.

Hussain had his maximum number of film appearances in 2015 as he had releases in English, Hindi, Bengali and his first Tamil and Marathi movies. His Hindi movies include Main Aur Charles as Amod Kant, Jai Ho Democracy as Major Baruah, and Angry Indian Goddesses as a police superintendent. He debuted in Tamil cinema with Yatchan portraying the significant role of Selvam/Vetri, He also worked in his first Marathi movie Sunrise as Joshi. His Bengali film of the year was Arindam Sil's mystery thriller Har Har Byomkesh as Zamindar Deepnarayan Singh.

His 2016 projects include the drama film Parched directed by Leena Yadav, which premiered at the Special Presentations section of the 2015 Toronto International Film Festival. It is about four women who lead a tightly controlled-by-traditions life in a village in Rajasthan. His other project in the year is the action thriller Force 2 directed by Abhinay Deo featuring John Abraham and Sonakshi Sinha in the lead. His Assamese film in 2016 is Kothanodi. Adil Hussain's 2017 releases include Commando 2: The Black Money Trail, Love Sonia, Mantra, Mukti Bhawan, Dobaara: See Your Evil, Kabuliwala, and Naval Enna Jewel.

In 2018, he acted in S. Shankar's 2.0 as well as in Aiyaary and Bioscopewala. In 2022, Hussain became the first-ever personality to hoist the Indian National Flag in the Metaverse at the 'Azadi Ka Amrit Mahotsav' Metaverse event organised by Piro Space.

== Life membership ==
In 2013, after having conducted a film workshop at University Film Club, Aligarh Muslim University, Hussain was granted a lifetime membership in the university's film club.

Hussain has been honoured by Sandeep Marwah with the life membership of International Film And Television Club of Asian Academy of Film & Television at Noida Film City.

== Personal life ==
During the 1999 Edinburgh Film Festival, Hussain, cast as Othello, fell in love with Kristen Jain, who was playing Desdemona. He ended up tightly hugging her, much to her and the audience's shock, instead of "killing" her as per the script, thus forcing the curtains to be brought down immediately. They eventually got married eight years later, in 2007.

== Filmography ==
Year	Title	Role	Language	Notes
1986	Xongkolpo	Pulak	Assamese	
1987	Sutrapaat		Assamese	
1988	Pita Putra		Assamese	
1989	Bhai Bhai		Assamese	
2003	In Othello	Adil / Othello	English	
2004	Iti Srikanta	Srikanta	Bengali	
2009	Kaminey	Flight Purser	Hindi	
2009	For Real	Ravi Shukla	English	
2010	Ishqiya	Vidyadhar Verma / Shyam Prasad Kulshreshtha	Hindi	
2010	Gangor	Upin	Bengali	
2012	Agent Vinod	Colonel	Hindi	
2012	The Reluctant Fundamentalist	Mustafa Fazil	English	
2012	English Vinglish	Satish Godbole	Hindi	
2012	Life of Pi	Santosh Patel	English	
2012	Lessons in Forgetting	J. A. Krishnamoorthy	English	
2013	Lootera	Inspector K. N. Singh	Hindi	
2013	Boyss Toh Boyss Hain		Hindi	
2014	Raag: The Rhythm of Love	Iqbal	Assamese	
2014	Kaanchi: The Unbreakable	CBI officer	Hindi	
2014	The Xposé	Rajan	Hindi	
2014	Sringkhal	Kalidas	Assamese	
2014	Rodor Sithi		Assamese	
2014	Zed Plus	Aslam Puncturewala	Hindi	
2014	Tigers / White Lies	Bilal	Hindi	
2015	Main Aur Charles	Amod Kant	Hindi	
2015	Jai Ho Democracy	Major Baruah	Hindi	
2015	Unfreedom / Blemished Light	Devraj	English/Hindi	
2015	Parched	Mystic lover	Hindi	
2015	Feast of Varanasi	Arjun	English	British film
2015	Yatchan	Selvam/Vetri	Tamil	
2015	Ahaan		Hindi	
2015	Nanak Shah Fakir	Rai Bullar	English	
2015	Arunoday-Sunrise	Joshi	Marathi	
2015	Angry Indian Goddesses	Police Superintendent	Hindi	
2015	Har Har Byomkesh	Deepnarayan Singh	Bengali	
2015	Umrika	Patel	Hindi	
2016	The Violin Player		Hindi	
2016	Crash test Aglaé		Hindi	
2016	Bombairiya		Hindi	
2016	Force 2	HRD Minister Brijesh Verma	Hindi	
2016	Kothanodi	Devinath	Assamese	
2016	Leena's Beauty Parlour		Assamese	Guest appearance
2016	Chakra		Hindi	
2017	Commando 2	Karan's Boss	Hindi	
2017	Love Sonia	Shiva	Hindi /English	
2017	Mantra	Man from Jharkhand	English/Hindi	
2017	Hotel Salvation	Rajiv	Hindi / English	
2017	Dobaara: See Your Evil	Alex Merchant	Hindi	
2017	What Will People Say	Mirza	Norwegian	
2017	Maj Rati Keteki	Priyendu Hazarika	Assamese	
2017	Naval Enna Jewel	Intelligence police officer	Malayalam	Malayalam film
2017	The Illegal	Papa	English	
2018	At Large		English	
2018	Maati	Jamil	Bengali	
2018	Ahare Mon	Purnendu Pahari	Bengali	
2018	Aiyaary	Retd. Colonel Mukesh Kapoor	Hindi	
2018	Bioscopewala	Robi Basu	Hindi	
2018	2.0	Minister S. Vijay Kumar	Tamil	
2018	Nine Hours In Mumbai	Veer	Hindi	
2018	Rajma Chawal		Hindi	
2019	Bombairiya	Pandya	Hindi	
2019	Kabir Singh	Dean of the college	Hindi	
2019	Good Newwz	Dr. Anand Joshi	Hindi	
2019	Nirvana Inn		Hindi	
2019	Raahgir - The Wayfarers	Lakhua	Hindi	
2019	Pareeksha	Bucchi	Hindi	ZEE5 film
2020	Abyakto	Rudra	Bengali	
2021	Bell Bottom	Santook	Hindi	
2021	India Sweets and Spices	Ranjit	English	
2023	Dr. Bezbaruah 2	Dr. Bezbaruah	Assamese	
2023	Sergeant	Inspector Haider Ali	Hindi	JioCinema film
2023	Otta		Malayalam	
2024	Ulajh	Dhanraj Bhatia	Hindi	
2024	Sikaar		English, Assamese	Indo-British film
2025	The Storyteller	Ratan Garodia	Hindi	Disney+Hotstar film
2025	Rudra		Assamese	
2025	The Confession	Krishna Swamy	English	
2025	Secret of a Mountain Serpent	Manik Guho	Hindi	
2026	Murders Too Close, Love Too Far	Shubhash	Hindi	
2026	Mercy	Father Joel	Hindi	
TBA	Ram		Malayalam	

=== Television ===
Year	Title	Role	Language	Notes
2002-2003	Jasoos Vijay	Vijay	Hindi	
2019	Delhi Crime	Kumar Vijay	Hindi	
2020	Star Trek: Discovery	Aditya Sahil	English	2 episodes
2022	Mukhbir - The Story of a Spy	Ramkishore Negi	Hindi	
2023	Tooth Pari: When Love Bites	Adi Deb	Hindi	
2026	Musafir Cafe	Mark Abraham	Hindi	
2026	Operation Safed Sagar	Air Marshall Vinod Patney	Hindi	

== Short films ==
Year	Title	Language	Notes
2003	Rasikan Re	Hindi	
2003	Butterfly	Hindi	
2010	Doctor, Nurse and Patient	Hindi	
2010	Tequila Nights (TV movie)	Hindi	
2012	Infected	English	
2013	Muniya	Hindi	
2014	Dwaraka	Hindi	
2014	One Last Question	Hindi	
2016	Azaad	Hindi	
2016	Bandhi	Hindi	
2016	Chutney	Hindi	
2021	Tea and a Rose	Hindi; English	Released as a part of the Voot Select anthology film Love in the Times of Corona

== National film awards ==
Year	Category	Film	Result
2017	National Film Award – Special Jury Award / Special Mention (Feature Film)	Mukti Bhawan	Won
2017	National Film Award – Special Jury Award / Special Mention (Feature Film)	Maj Rati Keteki	Won
2018	Amanda Award for Best Actor	What Will People Say	Won

== Other awards and nominations ==
Year	Category	Film	Result
2012	Best Actor - New Jersey Independent South Asian Cine Fest	Lessons in Forgetting	Won
2014	Best Actor-Prag Cine Awards	Raag: The Rhythm of Love	Won
2015	Best Actor In A Supporting Role-Stardust Awards	Main Aur Charles	Nominated
2018	IIFA Award for Best Actor	Mukti Bhawan	Nominated
