= Mahasamar =

- Directed by: Johns Mahaliya
- Screenplay by: Deepak Nath
- Story by: Bobby Sharma Baruah
- Produced by: Hira Gohain
- Starring: Nipon Goswami; Deepak Nath; Aimee Baruah; Ratul Deka
- Cinematography: Krishna Shah
- Edited by: Pranjal Kashyap
- Music by: Diganta Sharma; Abhijit Barman
- Distributed by: Siddhartha television
- Release date: 22 November 2013
- Country: India
- Language: Assamese

Mahasamar is a 2013 Assamese drama film directed by Johns Mahaliya and produced by Hira Gohain. The film tells a story about deforestation. Director and producer claimed that they made the film to aware people against ruthless deforestation. The film was released in theatres on 22 November 2013.

== Plot ==
Some traitors, corrupt politicians, dishonest government employees and local wood-mafias were destroying the vegetation of Pipraguri. An honest journalist and dutiful government employee became an obstacle for them. The appointed antisocial rough to keep up the power. At that time, a brave forest ranger officer arrived there and raised voice against the terror.

== Cast ==
- Nipon Goswami
- Dinesh Das
- Arun Nath
- Junu Baruah
- Deepak Nath
- Arun Hazarika
- Atul Pachani
- Ratul Deka
- Aimee Baruah

== Production ==
The film, produced by Hira Gohain, was distributed by Siddhartha Television of Tezpur. The film was shot with red camera and cinematographed by Krishna Shah. The songs were filmed at Tawang, Shillong, Shilghat, Nameri. With full of action, romance and entertainment, the movie was choreographed by Jini Mahaliyai. Editing was done by Pranjal Kashyap.

== Music ==
Music of the film was composed by Diganta Sharma and Abhijit Barman. Lalmohan rosogolla named an item song was sung by Bobita Sharma and performed on screen by Ukrainian dancer Arenai.

== Release ==
The film was censored on 28 October 2013. It was specially screened and released on 22 November on the same year.

== Recognition ==
Aimee Baruah was nominated for Best Actor Female in 2013 Filmfare Awards East for Assamese film category. Arun Nath won the second best actor at the Rodali awards.
