= Arun Sarma =

Writer from Assam, India

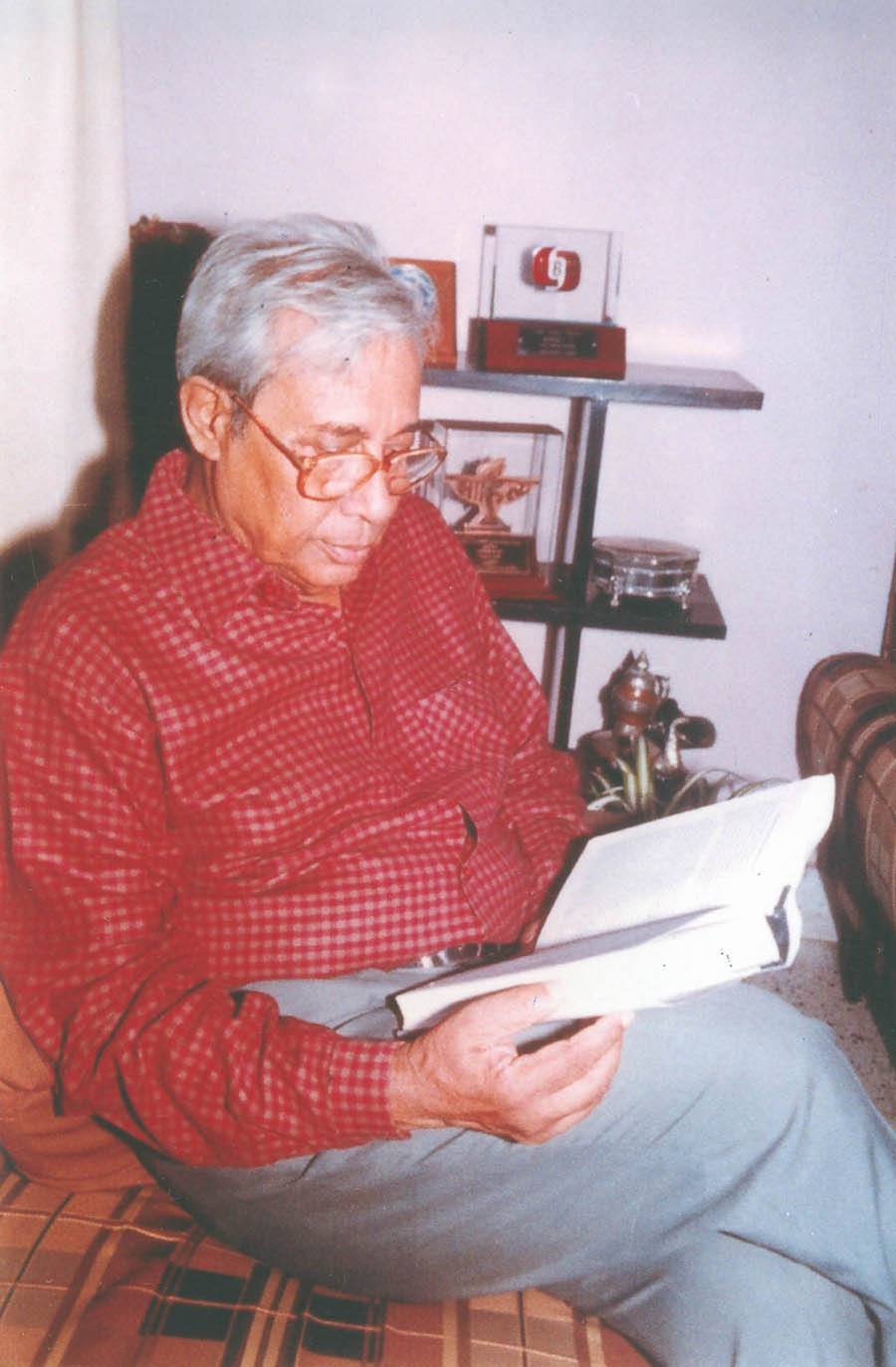
- Born: 3 November 1931; Dibrugarh, Assam
- Died: 27 March 2017 (aged 85); New Delhi
- Education: Cotton College
- Spouse: Arati Sharma
- Children: Nandinee Sharma Kalita, Ochintya Sharma
- Writing career
- Language: Assamese
- Genres: Poems, novel and drama
- Notable awards: Asom Natya Sanmilan Award (2001); Sahitya Akademi Award (1998); Sangeet Natak Akademi Award (2003); Assam Valley Literary Award (2005); Padma Shri (2010); Sankaracharyya Avatar Award Literature (2010)

Arun Sarma (3 November 1931 – 27 March 2017) was a writer of Assam. Arun Sarma was one of Assam's contemporary playwrights and is particularly known for his unconventional plays with some elements of drama. Besides drama, he also authored over six novels detailing the Assamese way of life. He was awarded the Padma Shri in 2010 in recognition of his contributions to Assamese literature. He has also been awarded the Sahitya Akademi Award in 1998 for the novel Ashirbadar Rong (The Hues of Blessing). He has won the Asam Sahitya Sabha's Best Playwright Award for two consecutive years and also has the rare distinction of having won the Sangeet Natak Akademi award in 2003 for his contributions to drama and the Sahitya Akademi award in 1998 for literature. He was also the recipient of the Assam Valley Literary Award in 2005.

== Early life ==
Arun Sarma was born in Dibrugarh where his father Tilak Chandra Sarma was the editor of The Times of Assam. In 1935, the family migrated to the village of Halemguri near the tea hamlet of Halem, where the elder Sarma, inspired by Gandhian ideals, decided to take up farming and engage himself in social work. The young Arun did his schooling in Tezpur High School and completed his matriculation in 1948. Sarma completed his B.A.(Hons in Education) in 1954 from Cotton College, Guwahati. He began writing drama and poetry during this period.

== Career ==
Sarma started his career in Guwahati in the editorial staff of The Assam Tribune in 1954. In 1955, he moved to his native village in Halem and joined as an Assistant Headmaster in Madhya Chaiduar High School popularly known as MCD High School established in the year 1948 (Now MCD Higher Secondary School) at Barangabari. In 1960, he came back to Guwahati to join All India Radio. From then till 1986, Sarma was associated with the Guwahati Station of All India Radio, working first as a producer and later as a senior producer. He headed the Educational Broadcasting Section, and did pioneering work in using radio as a potent medium for supplementing classroom education. He had a six-month training stint on Radio Programme Production in BBC, London, in 1969. Through the 1970s and 1980s, Sarma was instrumental in shaping the Drama section of the Guwahati Station. During this period he wrote and directed 47 plays and a good number of radio documentaries for the Station as well as for All India Radio's national programme and received three international best awards for his documentaries. He served as Station Director of the Dibrugarh Station of the All India Radio (1986–89) and retired from government service as Director, AIR, North East Service from Shillong in 1990.

Post retirement, he became the founder editor (1990–92) of the weekly Assamese newspaper Purbachal, and served from 1992 to 1997 as the Director of the Tea Centre of the Indian Tea Association. This was a period of strife in Assam and Sarma was called in to design and execute a set of projects to bridge the local tea industry and the Assamese people. In 2005, Sarma designed, scripted and executed a son-et-lumiere (sound-and-light show) describing the history of Assam which is played daily at the Sankardeva Kalakshetra in Guwahati every evening.

== Personal life ==
In 1959, Sarma married Arati, granddaughter of Assamese Freedom Fighter, Karmaveer Chandranath Sarma. They have two children – Nandinee and Ochintya. He died on 27 March 2017 at the Medanta medical institute.

== Awards ==
For literature

- Asam Sahitya Sabha (Drama) Award – 1967
- Asom Natya Sanmilan Award – 2001
- Sahitya Akademi Award – 1998 for the Novel 'Aashirbador Rong' (translated into English titled as 'On a Wing and a Prayer')
- Sangeet Natak Akademi Award – 2003
- Assam Valley Literary Award – 2005
- Padma Shri – 2010
- Sankaracharyya Avatar Award Literature – 2010

For radio broadcasting

- Japan Prize (1980) International for the radio documentary "All Buds to bloom".
- ABU (Asia-Pacific Broadcasting Union) Award (1982) for the radio documentary "Caution : Danger Ahead".
- Prix Futura Berlin Commendation certificate (1983) for the radio documentary "All Lips to Smile".
- Akashvani Award (Second best radio play in India) for the play titled "Kukurnechia Manuh".

== Works ==
=== Plays ===
- Urukha Paja (The Leaky Hut): 1954
- Jinti: 1955
- Sthawor: 1956
- Sri Nibaran Bhattacharyya: 1964
- Parashuram: 1962
- Purush! (The Man): 1965
- Kukurnechia Manuh (The Wolf Man): 1968
- Ahar (Food): 1970
- Chinyor (The Scream): 1972
- Buranji Path (The History Lesson): 1978
- Padma, Kunti Ityadi (Padma, Kunti, et al.): 1976
- Anya Ek Adhyay (Yet Another Chapter): 1994
- Poster : 1982
- Agnigarh (The Fortress of Fire): 1996
- Napoleon Aru Deserie: 1985
- Baghjaal (The Tiger Trap): 1983
- Chakrabyuha (The Labyrinth): 2003
- Aditir Atma Katha (Aditi's Autobiography): 2000
- Chitralekha: 2006
- Robes of Destiny (A Trilogy in English and some more plays): 2014
- Anupam Andhar (Dark is Beautiful): 2013
- Arun Sarma Nirbachito Natok (Collected Plays of Arun Sarma): 2014

=== Novels ===
- Ubhala Shipa (The Root Upturned: Also known as Nixi Ujagor: 1979
- Niriha Ashroy (Innocent Shelter)
- Aashirbador Rong (The Hues of Blessings), translated into English titled as 'On a Wing and a Prayer': 1996
- Sankalpa (The Pledge): 2008
- Baghjaal (The Tiger Trap - a short novel): 2014
- Nepothyo Chandranath: 2014

=== Poems ===
- Arun Sarmar Kabyanurag : 2012

=== Essays ===
- Arun Sarmar Natyoproxongo aaru Ononnyo Rosona (Theatre Critiques and other Essays) : 2012
