= List of songs about child abuse =

Many artists have written songs about child abuse, which includes emotional, physical, and sexual abuse.

== # ==
- "25 Years", by Pantera
- "13 'N Good", by Boogie Down Productions & KRS-One

== A ==
- "Aawaz - Speak Up Against Sexual Violence", by Jim Ankan Deka
- "A Bachelor For Baden Powell", by Carter The Unstoppable Sex Machine
- "A Day At The Park", by BionicPIG ft. LeonLush
- "Adam Raised a Cain", by Bruce Springsteen
- "Alive", by Pearl Jam
- "All Day Long", by New Order
- "Alyssa Lies", by Jason Michael Carroll
- "Amelia", by The Mission
- "Anna Lee" by Dream Theater
- "Angel", by Blue October
- "Anger Rising", by Jerry Cantrell
- "Ask Me", by Amy Grant
- "Apollo", by Hardwell
- "A Gunshot to the Head of Trepidation", by Trivium

== B ==
- "Baby's Romance", by Chris Garneau
- "Bad Wisdom", by Suzanne Vega
- "Beaten in Lips", by Beartooth
- "Because of You", by Kelly Clarkson
- "Black", by Okkervil River
- "Black Keyboard", by Xiu Xiu
- "Bang my Head against the Wall", by Sia
- "Blind", by Lifehouse
- "Bloodline", by Northlane
- "Blown Away", by Carrie Underwood
- "The Blue Flashing Light", by Travis
- "Broken Angel", by Boyce Avenue
- "Broken Girl", by Matthew West
- "Broken Home", by 5 Seconds of Summer
- "Brisbane Hotel Sutra", by The Mountain Goats
- "Break The Chain (One-Billion Rising)", by V-day
- "Broom People", by The Mountain Goats
- "Bottle Dreams", by Eyedea
- "Barbarism Begins at Home", by The Smiths

== C ==
- "Camila Camila", by Nenhum de Nós
- "Camisado", by Panic! at the Disco
- "Candles", by Daughter
- "Candyman", by Siouxsie and the Banshees
- "Cannibal", by Marcus Mumford
- "Castle on a Cloud", from Les Misérables
- "Child Called 'It'", by Buckcherry
- "Children Of The Night", by Richard Marx
- "Concrete Angel", by Martina McBride
- "Confessions of a Broken Heart", by Lindsay Lohan
- "Cleanin' Out My Closet", by Eminem
- "Cleaning Out My Closet", by Angel Haze
- "Clown", by Korn
- "Cradle", by Mudvayne
- "Convex, Concave", by Biffy Clyro
- "Cousin Kevin", by The Who

== D ==
- "Dad" by Nomeansno
- "Daddy", by Korn
- "Daddy" by Badflower
- "Daddy didn't love me", by AJJ
- "Dance Music", by The Mountain Goats
- "Damaged", by Plumb
- "Dark Parts", by Perfume Genius
- "Daughter", by Pearl Jam
- "Day Six: Childhood", by Ayreon
- "Down with the Sickness", by Disturbed
- "Drunk Daddy", by the Cherry Poppin' Daddies
- "Diana" by 3 Lb. Thrill
- "Diary of a Battered Child" by Dystopia
- "Disarm", by Smashing Pumpkins
- "Dead Babies", by Alice Cooper
- "Devil in a Midnight Mass", by Billy Talent
- "Don't Let Daddy Kiss Me", by Motörhead
- "Daddy's Girl", by Scorpions
- "Dear Mr. Jesus", by PowerSource
- "Dirty Night Clowns", by Chris Garneau
- "Dyers Eve", by Metallica

== E ==
- "Eclipse", by Northlane
- "Enough's Enough", by Alice Cooper
- "Eva", by Nightwish
- "End Of Me", by A Day To Remember
- "Evidence", by Tara MacLean
- "Everyone's Gone to the Movies", by Steely Dan
- "Expose Yourself to Kids", by GG Allin

== F ==
- "Face Down", by The Red Jumpsuit Apparatus
- "Falling Away from Me", by Korn
- "Family Line", by Conan Gray
- "Family Portrait", by P!nk
- "Family Tree", by Megadeth
- "Father", by LL Cool J
- "Father", by Demi Lovato
- "Father", by The Front Bottoms
- "Fee Fi Fo", by The Cranberries
- "Fiddle About", by The Who
- "Fire On Babylon", by Sinéad O'Connor
- "Five", by Machine Head
- "Fixxxer", by Metallica
- "For Adrian (Many Years Ago)", by Mark Tulk
- "For The Love of a Daughter", by Demi Lovato
- "For You", by Staind
- "Frozen", by Within Temptation

== G ==
- "Ghost", by Funeral for a Friend
- "Go", by blink-182
- "God Gave Us Life", by Half Man Half Biscuit
- "God Has a Plan for Us All", by Angtoria

== H ==
- "Halleluja", by Rammstein
- "Hallomann", by Rammstein
- "Hast Thou Considered the Tetrapod", by The Mountain Goats
- "He", by Jars of Clay
- "Hell Is for Children", by Pat Benatar
- "Hero", by Superchick
- "His Daughter", by Molly Kate Kestner
- "How Could You Leave Us?", by NF
- "Holy Water", by Big & Rich
- "Howard's Tale", by Sick Puppies
- "Homeless", by Marina Kaye
- "Hopeful", by Bars and Melody
- "Hope Ur Ok", by Olivia Rodrigo
- "Harvester of Sorrow", by Metallica
- "How Could You Leave Us", by NF
- "Hunger Strike", by Temple of The Dog
- "Hush", by Hellyeah
- “His Daughter” by Molly Kate Kestner
- "House of Pain" by Faster Pussycat

== I ==
- "I am One of Them", by Aly & AJ
- "I Threw Glass In My Friend's Eyes and Now I'm On Probation", by Destroy Boys
- "I Have a Right" by Sonata Arctica
- "Innocence", by Seventh Day Slumber
- "In Harm's Way", by Metal Church
- "In Your Care", by Tasmin Archer
- "In the Night", by The Weeknd
- "Insane", by Eminem
- "I'm OK", by Christina Aguilera
- "In a Darkened Room", by Skid Row
- "I'm a Boy", by The Who
- "I Left My Heart in Papworth General", by Half Man Half Biscuit
- "Independence Day", by Martina McBride

== J ==
- "Janie's Got a Gun", by Aerosmith
- "Jordan, Minnesota", by Big Black
- "Junior Dad", by Lou Reed and Metallica
- "Just Like You", by Three Days Grace
- "just a kid" by Noah Vela

== K ==
- "Keep on Livin'", by Le Tigre
- "Kristy, Are You Doing Okay?", by The Offspring
- "K.Y.A." by Flotsam and Jetsam

== L ==
- "La La La", by Naughty Boy
- "Leave the Light On", by Beth Hart
- "Lion's Teeth", by The Mountain Goats
- "The Little Girl", by John Michael Montgomery
- "Little House", by The Fray
- "Little Toy Guns", by Carrie Underwood
- "Lolita", by Lana del Rey
- "Luka", by Suzanne Vega
- "Let You Down", by NF
- "Little Susie", by Michael Jackson

== M ==
- "Magdalena", by Frank Zappa and the Mothers
- "Mansion", by NF
- "Me and a Gun" by Tori Amos
- "Millie Pulled a Pistol on Santa/Keepin' the Faith", by De La Soul
- "Missed Me", by The Dresden Dolls
- "My Mom", by Eminem
- "Me and Little Andy", by Dolly Parton
- "Mommy", by Mushroomhead
- "Mr. Tinkertrain", by Ozzy Osbourne
- "Must Have Been the Wind", by Alec Benjamin

== N ==
- "Never Again", by Nickelback
- "Never Too Late", by Three Days Grace
- "No More Sorry", by My Bloody Valentine
- "No Place Like Home", by Mesh
- "No Son of Mine", by Genesis
- "Nowhere To Stand", by k.d. lang
- "Numb", by Linkin Park
- No Power Over Me (Steve Siler)

== O ==
- "Open Wounds", by Skillet
- "Oh Father", by Madonna
- "Oh, Mother", by Christina Aguilera
- "Ohio", by Jacob Whitesides
- "One Last Breath", by Creed

== P ==
- "Pale Green Things", by The Mountain Goats
- "Panty Shot", by Mindless Self Indulgence
- "Papa", by Prince
- "Pedofilia" by Titãs
- "Perfect" by Alanis Morissette
- "Peruvian Skies" by Dream Theater
- "Petals", by Mariah Carey
- "Planet of the Apes", by Earthling
- "Points of Authority", by Linkin Park
- "Polly", by Nirvana
- "Predictable", by Good Charlotte
- "Pretty", by Korn
- "Prison Sex", by Tool
- "Punish" by Ethel Cain
- "Pushit", by Tool
- "Pure as a lamb" by Baby Bugs

== Q ==
- "A Question of Time", by Depeche Mode
- "A Quick One, While He's Away", by The Who

== R ==
- "Razor Blade", by Blue October
- "Red Football" by Sinéad O'Connor
- "Remember Everything", by Five Finger Death Punch
- "Rest in Pieces", by Saliva
- "Rearviewmirror", by Pearl Jam
- "Runaway Love", by Ludacris
- "Runaway Train", by Soul Asylum

== S ==
- "Saturday", by Hedley
- "Sandy Fishnets", by Evelyn Evelyn
- "Scream Of The Butterfly", by Acid Bath
- "Seven", by Taylor Swift
- "Seventeen", by MARINA
- "Shadows", by Chaotica
- "Shine", by Cold
- "Show Me the Way", by Styx
- "Sleep", by Stabbing Westward
- "Sleep Like a Baby Tonight", by U2
- "Slide", by The Dresden Dolls
- "Steven", by Jake Miller
- "Suggestion", by Fugazi
- "Superheroes", by The Script
- "Suffer Little Children", by The Smiths
- "Sweet Lorraine", by Patty Griffin

== T ==
- "Tell Me There's a Heaven", by Chris Rea
- "The Ballad of Dwight Fry", by Alice Cooper
- "The Childcatcher", by Patrick Wolf
- "The Dark I Know Well", by Spring Awakening Cast
- "The Dreadful Hours", by My Dying Bride
- "The Evangelist", by Spawn of Possession
- "The Family Jewels", by MARINA
- "The monster", by Insane Clown Posse
- "Three Points on a Compass", by Martin Rossiter
- “This Life Is Mine”, by Jeff Williams
- "This Year", by The Mountain Goats
- "Tier", by Rammstein
- "A Trophy Father's Trophy Son", by Sleeping With Sirens
- "Too Beautiful", by He Is We
- "The Father Who Must Be Killed", by Morrissey
- "The Hand That Rocks The Cradle", by The Smiths
- "The Other Side", by Smile Empty Soul
- "Two Beds and a Coffee Machine", by Savage Garden

== U ==
- "Uncle Jack", by Mötley Crüe
- "Uncle Salty", by Aerosmith
- "The Unforgiven", by Metallica
- "Universal Child", by Annie Lennox

== W ==
- "Wash Away Those Years", by Creed
- "What About", by Janet Jackson
- "What's It Gonna Take", by Ronnie McDowell
- "What's the Matter Here", by 10,000 Maniacs
- "When Did This Storm Begin", by Shiny Toy Guns
- "Wonderful", by Everclear
- "Warrior", by Demi Lovato
- "Weisses Fleisch", by Rammstein
- "Well Fancy That", by Fun Boy Three
- "Welcome to my Life", by Simple Plan
- "Wiener Blut", by Rammstein
- "When she cries" by Britt Nicole

== Y ==
- "Years Ago", by Alice Cooper
- "You", by Everclear
- "You Knocked the Love (Right Outta My Heart)", by Millie Jackson
- “Yvette”, by Jason Isbell
