= Timeless (Jim Ankan Deka album) =

Studio album by Jim Ankan Deka
- Released: 2012
- Recorded: 2012, Eastern Fare Studios, Bangalore, India
- Genre: Easy Listening, Pop, Jazz fusion
- Length: 29.27
- Label: Eastern Fare, IndiEarth

Jim Ankan Deka chronology
Tomaloi (Assamese) (2006)	Timeless (2012)	Aawaz (2013)

Timeless is a multilingual album by Assamese musician Jim Ankan Deka. The album was recorded in 2012. The CD contains seven tracks while the digital version has only five tracks. The album is a tribute to Indian music maestros Dr. Bhupen Hazarika and Nusrat Fateh Ali Khan, writer Bhabananda Deka and the National anthem of India.

== Overview ==
The album is a collaboration with Bengali singer Ritwika Bhattacharya, Carnatic vocalist and veena player Suchethan Rangaswamy and US based poet Mardee Agen. While three of the tracks Eastwards, Independence Awekening and Remember your Faith are instrumental, Shabd (Hindi), Ganga (Hindi) and Tere Bin Nahi Lagda (Punjabi) are sung by Ritwika and Xobdor Porisoy (Assamese) by Jim himself. Eastwards is the only fusion track of the album. It has the essence of Carnatic music and Acoustic rock. Remember Your Faith is based on a poem by Mardee Agen. The album is produced by Bangalore based music institute Eastern Fare Music Foundation.

Before the release of the album, two of the tracks Ganga and Tere Bin Nahi Lagda were released as singles in the same year. Ganga was originally composed by Bhupen Hazarika and Tere Bin Nahi Lagda was by Nusrat Fateh Ali Khan.

Two months before the release of the album, two of music videos - Tere Bin Nahi Lagda and Xobdor Porisoy, were released online. Both the videos were directed by Parmita Borah.

About Xobdor Porisoy Jim says, "The lyrics of 'Xobdor Porisoy' just occurred to me two years back as I sipped a steaming cup of tea on a rainy summer afternoon. It was gathering dust tucked away in a diary for quite sometime when, after a gap of two years, I suddenly found it, and like an ex-flame, it stirred unspoken feelings inside me. I worked on the music composition for a couple of days and things fell into place,".

Artwork of the album is done by Bangalore-based artist Trinayan Bora and Pranjal Barua.

== Track listing ==
1. "Shabd" – 4.26 (Jim Ankan, Ritwika)
2. "Ganga" – 4.37 (Jim Ankan, Ritwika)
3. "Tere Bin Nahi Lagda" – 5.06 (Jim Ankan, Ritwika)
4. "Xobdor Porisoy" – 4.28 (Jim Ankan)
5. "Eastwards" – 4.76 (Jim Ankan, Suchethan)
6. "Independence Awekening" – 4.17 (Jim Ankan)
7. "Remember Your Faith" – 2.37 (Jim Ankan, Mardee Agen)

== Personnel ==
- Jim Ankan Deka - Guitar, Keyboards, Drums
- Ritwika Bhattacharya - Vocals
- Suchethan Rangaswamy - Veena
