= List of Assamese films of the 2000s =

A list of films produced by the film industry of Assam based in Guwahati, India and publicly released in the decade of 2000s (from year 2000 to 2009).

== 2000 ==
#	Release date	Title	Director	Music director	Ref.
1		Mrityuhin Jeevan	Manoranjan Sur	Taffazul Ali	
2	18 February	Nisiddha Nodi	Bidyut Chakraborty	Sher Chaudhary	
3	25 February	Hiya Diya Niya	Munin Barua	Zubeen Garg	
3	25 February	Tumi Mor Maatho Mor	Zubeen Garg	Zubeen Garg	
4	3 March	Ahankaar	Pradip Hazarika	N. Amrit	
6		Aasene Konoba Hiyaat	Baharul Islam	Manoj Sarma	
7	13 October	Bhumiputra	Jayanta Das	Jayanta Das (Junti)	
8		Matsyagandha	Sanjeev Hazarika	Sher Chaudhary	
9	10 November	Jon Jwole Kopalot	Munna Ahmed	Jayanta Das (Junti)	
10		Jugantarar Tejal Puwa	Jones Mahaliya	Debajit Choudhury	

== 2001 ==
#	Release date	Title	Director	Music director
1	2 February	Daag	Munin Barua	Zubeen Garg
2	23 March	Shesh Upahar	Gopal Barthakur	Zubeen Garg, Bhupen Uzir, J.P.Das, Rupam Talukdar
3	20 April	Seuji Dharani Dhuniya	Rajib Bhattacharya	Rajib Bhattacharya
4	6 July	Anya Ek Jatra	Manju Borah	Rishiraj Duwara
5	3 August	Bishforan	Kandarpa Saikia	Kandarpa-Dhiraj
6	7 September	Kaina Mor Dhuniya	Suman Haripriya	Pradip-Anupam
7	12 October	Garam Bataah	Brajen Borah	Jatin Sharma
8	2 November	Aei Maram Tomar Babe	Taufiq Rahman	Bhupen Ujir
9	23 November	I Love You	Ashok Kumar Bishaya	Chaaru Gohain, Jayanta Pathak, Akhim Hazarika, Bijoy Bhuyan, Prantik Phukan
10	30 November	Nayak	Munin Barua	Zubeen Garg

== 2002 ==
#	Release date	Title	Director	Music director
1	8 February	Prem Aru Prem	Shambhu Gupta	Zubeen Garg
2	18 February	Iman Maram Kiyo Lage	Alok Nath	Manuj Sharma
3	15 March	Jakham	Munna Ahmed	Bhupen Ujir
4	19 March	Kanyadaan	Munin Barua	Zubeen Garg
5	22 March	Jonaki Mon	Jibanraj Barman	Zubeen Garg
6	23 March	Tumiye Mor Kalpanar	Bipul Kumar Baruah	Nayanmoni Barua, Jayanta Das(Junti)
7	19 April	Priya O Priya	Anjan Kalita	Manash Rabin
8	9 May	Jiban Nadir Duti Paar	Munna Ahmed	Manash Adhikari
9	17 May	Marami Hobane Lagari	Isha Khan	Bhupen Ujir, Manash Hazarika
10	24 May	Gun Gun Gane Gane	Bidyut Chakraborty	Kamal Rashid Ahmed
11	6 September	Tyag	Narayan Sheel	Jitu-Tapan
12	4 October	Mitha Mitha Laganat	Achyut Kumar Bhagawati, Sushant Kumar Majumdar Baruah	Manash Hazarika
13	11 October	Mon	Bani Das	Manash Hazarika, Dilip Nath
14	18 October	Maghat Mamanir Biya	Chandra Mudoi	Jayanta Das, Dilip Phukan, Pradyut Mishra
15	25 October	Panoi Janki	Dilip Doley, Narayan Sheel	Dilip Doley
16	15 November	Kokadeutar Ghar Jowai	Suman Haripriya	Prabhat Sharma, Manti Baishya, Biju Prabha, Manas Robin
17	20 December	Konikar Ramdhenu	Jahnu Barua	Y.S.Mulki, Rita Baruah Das
18	20 December	Premgeet	Ashish Saikia	Manash Hazarika

== 2003 ==
#	Release date	Title	Director	Music director
1	3 January	Arpan	Krishna Phukan	Jitumoni Kalita
2	17 January	Agnishakshi	Jadumoni Datta	Zubeen Garg
3	24 January	Patni	Pulak Gogoi	Atul Medhi
4	7 February	Hitlist	Dinesh Gogoi	Sadananda Gogoi
5	28 February	Maa	Padma Koiri	Prakash
6	21 March	Priya Milan	Munna Ahmed	Zubeen Garg
7	28 March	Bidhata	Munin Barua	Zubeen Garg
8	11 April	Aiyei Jonak Biheen Jivan	Munna Ahmed	Manas Robin
9	16 May	Saru Bowari	Chakradhar Deka	Bijoy Lakhmi
10	6 June	Prem Bhara Sakulo	Prabin Borah	Abani-Bhaben
11	19 September	Juman-Suman	Mahibul Hauq	Zubeen Garg
12	26 September	Satyam-Shivam-Sundaram	Brajen Borah	Bhupen ujir
13	3 October	Bandhan	Tauphick Rahman	Manuj sharma
14	17 October	Ujanir Dujani Gabharu	Chandra Mudai	Manash Rabin
15	14 November	Akashitarar Kathare	Manju Borah	Tarali Sarma
16	19 December	Hepaah (Yearning)	Shankar Borua	Jitul Sonowal
17	Special shows	Eti Kalir Duti Paat	Nayan Mani Baruah	Nayan Mani Baruah

== 2004 ==
#	Release date	Title	Director	Music director
1	9 January	Maa Tumi Ananya	Munna Ahmed	Dr. Hitesh Baruah
2	9 January	Juye Pura Sun	Sanjib Sabhapandit	Aniruddha Baruah
3	16 January	Hridoy Kapowa Gaan	Jayanta Nath	Jayanta Nath
4	26 March	Maya	Rajesh Bora, Pabitra Margherita	Zubeen Garg
5	16 April	Barud	Munin Barua	Zubeen Garg
6	30 April	Kaadambari	Bani Das	Manash Rabin
7	16 May	Rang	Munin Barua	Zubeen Garg
8	16 May	Manat Birinar Jui	Ashok Kumar Bishaya	Hiranya Kashyap, Diganta Sarma, Abhijit Barman, Suresh Kumar
9	15 October	Dinabandhoo	Munin Barua	Zubeen Garg
10	15 October	Rangman	Amal Baruah	Manash Rabin
11	12 November	Laaj	Manju Borah	Tarali Sarma
12	19 November	Anuraag	Bidyut Chakravarty	Diganta Bharat
13	24 December	Chakrabyuh	Pranjal Saikia	Sher Choudhury

== 2005 ==
#	Release date	Title	Director	Music director
1	7 January	Junbai	Rajesh Bhuyan	Manas Robin
2	7 January	The Sixth Day of Creation	Deepa Bhattacharya	Bibha Bhattacharya, Madhav Deka
3	14 January	Soanar Khaaru Nelage Mok	Rijani Barman	Apurba Bezbaruah
4	29 April	Antaheen Jatra	Munna Ahmed	Dr. Hitesh Baruah
5	6 May	Hiyar Daponat Tomarei Sobi	Sibanan Baruah	Palash Gogoi
6	2 September	Kadamtole Krishna Nache	Suman Haripriya	Prabhat Sarma
7	16 September	Suren Suror Putek	Chandra Mudoi	Dr. Hitesh Baruah
8	9 December	Jeevan Trishna	Arup Manna	Manash Hazarika
9	23 December	Chenai Mur Dhulia	Chandra Mudoi	Jitul Sonowal, Jayanta Das
10	29 December	Champa	Narayan Shill	Manas Robin

== 2006 ==
2006
1	20 January	Aghari Atma	Munna Ahmed	Bhupen Ujir
2	3 February	Snehabandhan	Debajit Adhikary	Nanda Benarjee
3	17 February	Adhinayak	Jatin Bora	Zubeen Garg
4	28 April	Deuta Diya Biday	Ramesh Modi	Jitu-Tapan, Manash Adhikary
5	8 September	Aami Asomiya	Rajeev Bhattacharya	Zubeen Garg
6	29 December	Jatinga Ityadi	Sanjib Sabhapandit	Deepak Sarma

== 2007 ==
2007
1	5 January	Meghali	Prabal Khaund	Krishnamoni Nath
2	6 April	Ahir Bhairav	Shiba Prasad Thakur	Hemanta Goswami
3	27 April	Nilakantha	Rajani Barman	Ananta Bezbaruah
4	7 September	Jonda Iman Gunda	Chandra Mudoi	Dr. Hitesh Baruah
5	30 November	Joymoti	Manju Borah	
6	28 December	Majulir Nasoni	Sibanan Baruah	Parmeshwar Basumatary
7	28 December	Double Piriti 2	Bulbul Hussain	Bulbul Hussain

== 2008 ==
2008
1	4 January	Jonaki Mon	Rajesh Bhuyan	Zubeen Garg
2	4 January	Meghali 2008	Prabal Khaund	C.S Shivaa, Krishnamoni Nath
3	4 January	Anjana 2008	Rajesh Bhuyan	Mousam Gogoi
4	4 January	Bogitora 2008	Rajesh Bhuyan	Krishnamoni Nath
5	4 January	Junbai 4	Rajesh Bhuyan	Manas Robin
6	30 May	Prem Pahare Bhoyame	Rajesh Bhuyan	
7	9 September	Mon Jaai	M. Maniram	Zubeen Garg
7	12 December	Dhan Kuberor Dhan	Dhiraj Kashyap	Lyton

== 2009 ==
2009
1	9 January	Dhunia Tirutabur	Prodyut Kumar Deka	Angaraag Mahanta, Papon
2	9 January	Lakhimi	Rajesh Bhuyan	Arup Dutta
3	9 January	Abhimani Mon	Rajesh Bhuyan	Arup Dutta
4	2 October	Jeevan Baator Logori	Timothy Das Hanse	Biman Baruah, Arup Dutta, Timothy Das Hanse
