= Aikyatan =

Performing space in Guwahati, India

- Formation: 1976
- Founder: Pabitra Kumar Deka
- Type: Theatre group
- Location: Guwahati, India

Aikyatan is a progressive drama group based in Guwahati in Assam founded by humor writer and film critic Pabitra Kumar Deka, historian and former principal of Cotton College Udayaditya Bharali, writer Anil Kumar Deka, editor of the Assamese daily Asomiya Pratidin Nitya Bora and others in 1976. It has produced plays including Janani, Surjastak, Panchatantra, Night of January 16, and A Doll's House.

Formerly, the group was called Naxa Natya Parishad in the late sixties and early seventies. It staged the Assamese adaptation of Bertolt Brecht play Maa (Mother) based on the story of Maxim Gorky in 1974 in Guwahati. The play was translated by Pabitra Kumar Deka, advisor was Kulada Kumar Bhattacharya, direction by Ratna Ojha with music by Bhupen Hazarika.

Aikyatan Sangeet Vidyalay, a school for learning western and Indian music was also formed by Aikyatan.

The group was most prominent in the 1970s and 1980s. In the early 2010s it was revived by independent filmmaker and writer Prodyut Kumar Deka, son of Aikyatan's founder Pabitra Kumar Deka. Aikyatan commemorated its glorious Golden Jubilee with a two-day event on 13th and 14th February 2026 featuring pantomime performance by Sangeet Natak Akademi winner Moinul Hoque, followed by a short mystery play titled Ayurekha, written by eminent litterateur Saurabh Kumar Chaliha and directed by Prodyut Kumar Deka.

== Major Productions ==
Year	Drama	Original writer	Translation	Direction
1976	Dhanani	Ratan Ghosh	Pabitra Kumar Deka	Ratna Ojha
1977	Akonihotor Suwoni Desh (Opera)	Tarun Sarma		Pranjal Saikia
1977	Jukti Tarko	Albert Camus	Dulal Roy	Dulal Roy
1978	Aikyatan Drama Festival			
	Janani	Arati Das Boiragi		Govind Gupta
	Surjastak	C R Das		Govind Gupta
1978	Ahatgurir Natun Baat	Mahendra Borthakur		Nilu Chakrabarty
1979	Asami Hazir	Neil Grant	Pabitra Kumar Deka	Aikyatan
1979	Sinhashan Khali	Sushil Singha	Krishnamurti Hazarika	Krishnamurti Hazarika
1979	Panchatantra (Opera)			Garima Hazarika
1981	Hewers of Coal	Joe Corrie	Sanjeev Hazorika	Sanjeev Hazorika
1984	Upahar	Sharada Kanta Bordoloi		Aikyatan
1984	Chorus	Munin Sharma		Munin Sharma, Dipak Sangha, Dibrugarh
1985	Ramleela (Shadow Play)			Uday Shankar School of Dance Music Ballet, Kolkata
1989	Night of January 16th	Ayn Rand	Utpal Datta	Sanjeev Hazorika
1990	Potola Ghar	Henrik Ibsen	Padma Borkotoki	Sanjeev Hazorika
1991	Mukabhinoy Sandhiya			Niranjan Goswami & Moinul Hoque
2016	Jonakar Pohar	Lady Gregory	Prodyut Kumar Deka	Prodyut Kumar Deka
2018	The Game of Chess	Kenneth Sawyer Goodman	Prodyut Kumar Deka	Prodyut Kumar Deka
2024	27 Gaari Kopah	Tennessee Williams	Suresh Kumar	Prodyut Kumar Deka
2026	Aikyatan@50 Festival			
	Mukabhinoy	Moinul Hoque		Moinul Hoque
	Ayurekha	Saurabh Kumar Chaliha		Prodyut Kumar Deka

== See also ==
- Pabitra Kumar Deka
- Prodyut Kumar Deka
