= Ramdia =

- Village
- Location in Assam, India Ramdia (India)
- Coordinates: 26.232405°N 91.499431°E
- Country: India
- State: Assam
- Region: Western Assam
- District: Kamrup

Government
  - Body: Gram panchayat
- Elevation: 42 m (138 ft)

Languages
  - Official: Assamese
- Time zone: UTC+5:30 (IST)
- PIN: 781102
- Vehicle registration: AS
- Website: kamrup.nic.in

Ramdia is an Indian village in Kamrup rural district in the state of Assam. It is situated on the north bank of river Brahmaputra 30 km from the city Guwahati, near Hajo town. Farming, local businesses, and government service are main professions of the people of Ramdia.

== Education ==
Ramdia has several government and non-government schools and a college, including:

- Ramdia Higher Secondary School
- Sankardev Vidya Niketan Ramdia
- Binandi Chandra Medhi College, Ramdia
- Daffodil English School Ramdia
- Ujankuri M.E. School
- Kaliram Medhi Girls High School Ramdia
- Ramdia Girls High School
- Ujankuri High School
- Hahdia L.P. School, Hahdia
- Sunrise English Academy
- Aloran Educational Trust, Ramdia
- Ancholik Jatiya Vidyalay

== Transport ==
The village is near National Highway 27 and connected to nearby towns and cities with regular buses and other modes of transportation. Regular bus services along with local passenger vehicles are available from Guwahati.

== Notable people ==
- Kaliram Medhi
- Saurav Kumar Chaliha

== See also ==
- Sualkuchi
