= Prodyut Kumar Deka =

Indian film director and author from Assam

- Born: 18 April 1978 (age 48)
- Occupations: Film director, author and works in Assam Secretariat
- Notable work: Dhunia Tirutabur; Samiran Barua Ahi Ase; Surjasta; Borosi

Prodyut Kumar Deka (born 18 April 1978) is an Indian writer, film and stage director, screenwriter and presently editor of Roopkar magazine based in Assam. His films include Dhunia Tirutabur (2009), Samiran Barua Ahi Ase (2012), Surjasta (2013), and Borosi (2014).

He turned to writing English fiction gradually from 2016 with the anthropological Ambari Series based on the Ambari Archeological site in Guwahati.

In 2025, to commemorate fifty years of publication of Roopkar, founded by his father late Pabitra Kumar Deka, the magazine was revived by Prodyut Kumar Deka, who announced it would be published annually as a Special issue.

== Film and television ==
In 1989, he made his debut as a child actor in the TV film Dalal, directed by National Award-winning filmmaker Bidyut Chakrabarty. He later appeared in television serials such as Deuta (1991), directed by renowned filmstar Biju Phukan, and Aie Saharate (1992), directed by Prabin Hazarika.

He made his debut as scriptwriter and director with the critically acclaimed Assamese film Dhunia Tirutabur (English: Beautiful Woman) in 2009, based on the disappearance of an artist. His next film, Samiran Barua Ahi Ase (English: Return of Samiran Barua), was based on a political subject and was released in 2012. He tentatively planned to direct a sequel of the movie, titled Samiran Baruah Aru Nahe but the plans were dropped for unstated reasons.

His other films include Surjasta (English: A Sunset), a 2013 work on the subject of child negligence, the 2014 suspense drama Borosi (English: The Trap) and a 2016 television film, Dristi (The Vision), based on Rabindranath Tagore's story of the same name. Surjasta received nominations in the Best Actor Male and Female categories at the Filmfare Awards 2013 (East). Deka contributed to one segment (Ardhasatya) in the anthology film Ji Golpor Sesh Nai. A special screening of the film was held on 18 April 2019 and received favorable praise from the media. Presently he will be directing one segment (Paap) in the forthcoming anthology film Kahini Nohoi which will pay homage to the master of suspense Alfred Hitchcock.

His latest projects include Chiyahir Rong, a 2021 film about newspaper houses in Assam, based on a story by journalist Jitumoni Bora, and The Government Servant, a film set in Mayong and based on a story by Sahitya Akademi Award winner Jayant Madhab Bora. Both films were released online in the Reel Drama portal.

He was co-scriptwriter of the films Orong (Strangers in the Mist) (2015) on child psychology and Rum Vodka Whiskey (2017), based on three unsuccessful love stories in different seasons. Orong won the National Award for Best Rabha film in 2015. He wrote the screenplay of the forthcoming film Smriti, which is directed by Pankaj Kalita and is under production.

He has made two short films based on essays by Assamese writer and journalist Homen Borgohain,Why I write (2008) and A short film about Walking (2011), which were shown in various film festivals. He also made a 50-minute documentary, An Anti-insurgent Journey, which depicts former Asam Sahitya Sabha Chief Kanaksen Deka and his stance against subversive activities of the outfit in the 1990s.

== Theatre ==
He revived the theatre group Aikyatan in late 2010s, originally founded by his father Pabitra Kumar Deka in the early 1970s. With the group, he has directed plays such as Moni Kanchan (Badal Sircar), Jonakor Pohar (English:The Rising of the Moon), The Game of Chess, 27 Gaari Kopah (English: 27 Wagons full of Cotton) and Ayurekha. Deka penned an Assamese translation of the play Eserenga Rod (English: A Sunny Morning), which was premiered in Natasurjya Drama Festival 2016 under the direction of Pranjal Saikia.

Also associated with Indian People's Theatre Association, Assam, he has directed Coffee Housot Apeksha (On the occasion of platinum jubilee) and the famous play An Inspector Calls written by J. B. Priestley in 2019 at Guwahati.

== Writing ==
He writes on cinema in the local Assamese newspapers like Sadin, Asomiya Pratidin, Agradoot and Asomiya Khobor. He has published several books on cinema and television. His 2021 biography of actor Biju Phukan, Biju Phukan: A Life in Cinema, won the Best Book on Cinema award in the Assam State Film Awards, 2026 and Prag Cine Awards, 2022. He has also written a trilogy of anthropological novels based on the Ambari Archeological site which was discovered in Guwahati in 1969. Presently, he edits the famous cultural magazine Roopkar published yearly.

=== Publications ===
==== Non-fiction ====
- Amar Kotha Teolokor Kotha (in Assamese). Guwahati: Arclights. 2014., anthology of cinema essays
- Cinema Suwar Ananda (in Assamese). Guwahati: Arclights. 2017., anthology of cinema essays
- Biju Phukan: A Life in Cinema. Guwahati: Assam Publishing Company. 2021., biography
- Doordarshanor Dinbur (in Assamese). Guwahati: Asom Prakashan Parishad. 2023., a history of television or Doordarshan in Assam

==== Novels ====
Ambari trilogy

- Ambari. Delhi: Educreation Publishing. 2017.
- Prophecy of Ambari. Delhi: Educreation Publishing. 2018.
- A Monk in Ambari. Delhi: Educreation Publishing. 2020.

Translations

- Chandler, Raymond (2023). The Big Sleep (in Assamese). Guwahati: Roopkar Prakashan.
- Datta, Utpal (2024). The Last Signature of Mozart. UD Foundation.

== Personal life ==
Prodyut Kumar Deka was born in Guwahati, Assam. He is the younger son of Humour writer and film critic Pabitra Kumar Deka and the grandson of Mahendra Nath Deka, a government officer and film distributor in the early 1970s. He has one elder brother Prantik Deka, a still photographer, film critic and producer of documentaries. Prodyut passed his graduation in Commerce in 2000 and completed Law in 2006 from Gauhati University. He works as a Section Officer in the Assam Secretariat since 2010 and lives in Pub-Sarania, Guwahati, Assam (India). He is married to Pallabi Borah, who hails originally from Nagaon and also a writer, and they have two sons, Nihaar Ranjan Deka and Ivan Deka.

Prodyut and his family members run the NGO Pabitra Kumar Deka Archive, an archive of old Assamese film materials, in memory of his father. The archive has presented the Roopkar Award to one outstanding personality from stage, film and media annually since 2011.

== Filmography ==
=== As producer/director ===
Year	Title	English Title	Genre	Awards/Festivals
2002	Hatura	The Monkeys Paw	Tele play/Doordarshan Kendra	
2003	Abartan		5 Episode/Doordarshan Kendra	
2006	Murder		TV series/NE TV	
2008	Mayajal		5 Episode/Doordarshan Kendra	
2008	Shanti Tirtha		5 Episode/Doordarshan Kendra	
2008	Why I Write		Short film	Hyderabad film festival, Mumbai International film festival, North East Film Festival, Twilight Film Festival, New Delhi
2009	Dhunia Tirutabur	Beautiful Women	Feature	Best Director, Editor and Make up Award in Assam State Film Festival, 2010
2010	Cinema Cinema		TV series/NE TV	
2010	Pas Porichalokor Pasta Kahini		5 Short films/Rong TV	
2011	A Short film about Walking		Short film	Dhaka International film festival
2011	Samiran Barua Ahi Ase	Return of Samiran Barua	Feature	12th Kolkata International film festival, 2012
2012	Eta Nikhut Hatya		5 Episode/Doordarshan Kendra	
2013	Surjasta	A Sunset	Feature	Nomination in Best Actor Male and Female category in Filmfare Awards 2013 (East)
2014	An Anti-Insurgent Journey		Documentary	3rd Bangalore Short Film Festival, Indian Cine Film Festival, 2014, Mumbai
2014	Borosi	The Trap	Feature	5th Dada Saheb Film Festival 2015, New Delhi
2016	Dristi	The Vision	Tele film/Prag News	
2019	Ji Golpor Sesh Nai	Never Ending Stories	Feature (First Anthology film from Assam)	12th International Guwahati Film Festival, 2020
2021	Chiyahir Rong	The Color of Pen	Feature (OTT)	13th International Guwahati Film Festival, 2021
2023	The Government Servant		Feature (OTT)	Northeast Film Festival 2023, Mumbai
TBA	Kahini Nohoi	Not a Story	Feature (Anthology film)	

== Stage drama ==
=== As director ===
Year	Title	Original writer	Translation	Group	Venue
2011	Moni Kanchan	Badal Sircar	Nayan Prasad	Adda	Surjya, Ambari
2016	Jonakor Pohar (Rising of the Moon)	Lady Gregory	Prodyut Kumar Deka	Aikyatan	Surjya, Ambari
2018	Game of Chess	Kenneth Sawyer Goodman	Prodyut Kumar Deka	Aikyatan	Surjya, Ambari
2019	An Inspector Calls	J. B. Priestley	Phani Sarma	IPTA	Kumar Bhaskar Natya Mandir, Uzan Bazar
2024	27 Gaari Kopah (27 Wagons full of Cotton)	Tennessee Williams	Suresh Kumar	Aikyatan	Surjya, Ambari
2026	Ayurekha	Saurabh Kumar Chaliha		Aikyatan	New Art Players, Guwahati Club
