= Samakalin =

Assamese magazine

Samakalin was a progressive Assamese magazine published from Guwahati in the 1960s. It served as a platform for emerging writers and engaged with the socio-political discourse of Assam during that period. The magazine was published by Pabitra Kumar Deka, Amal Barua and Gobinda Chandra Gogoi, all employees of Assam Tribune group of newspapers.

The Editors of the magazine were Amulya Barua and the novelist Padma Borkotoki. Many writers like Kirtinath Hazarika, Hiren Gohain, Lakshmi Nandan Bora, Nirode Choudhury, Pabitra Kumar Deka, Nitya Bora, Rabindra Sarkar, Kamal Gogoi and Saurabh Kumar Chaliha were regular contributors to the journal.

A theatre group was also opened under the Samakalin group known as Samakalin Natya Gosthi and plays like Surjyahara (Gauri Barman) and Putolar Namaskar (Atul Bordoloi) were staged in the late sixties.
