= Eastern Fare Music Foundation =

Music school, production and publishing house in Guwahati, Assam

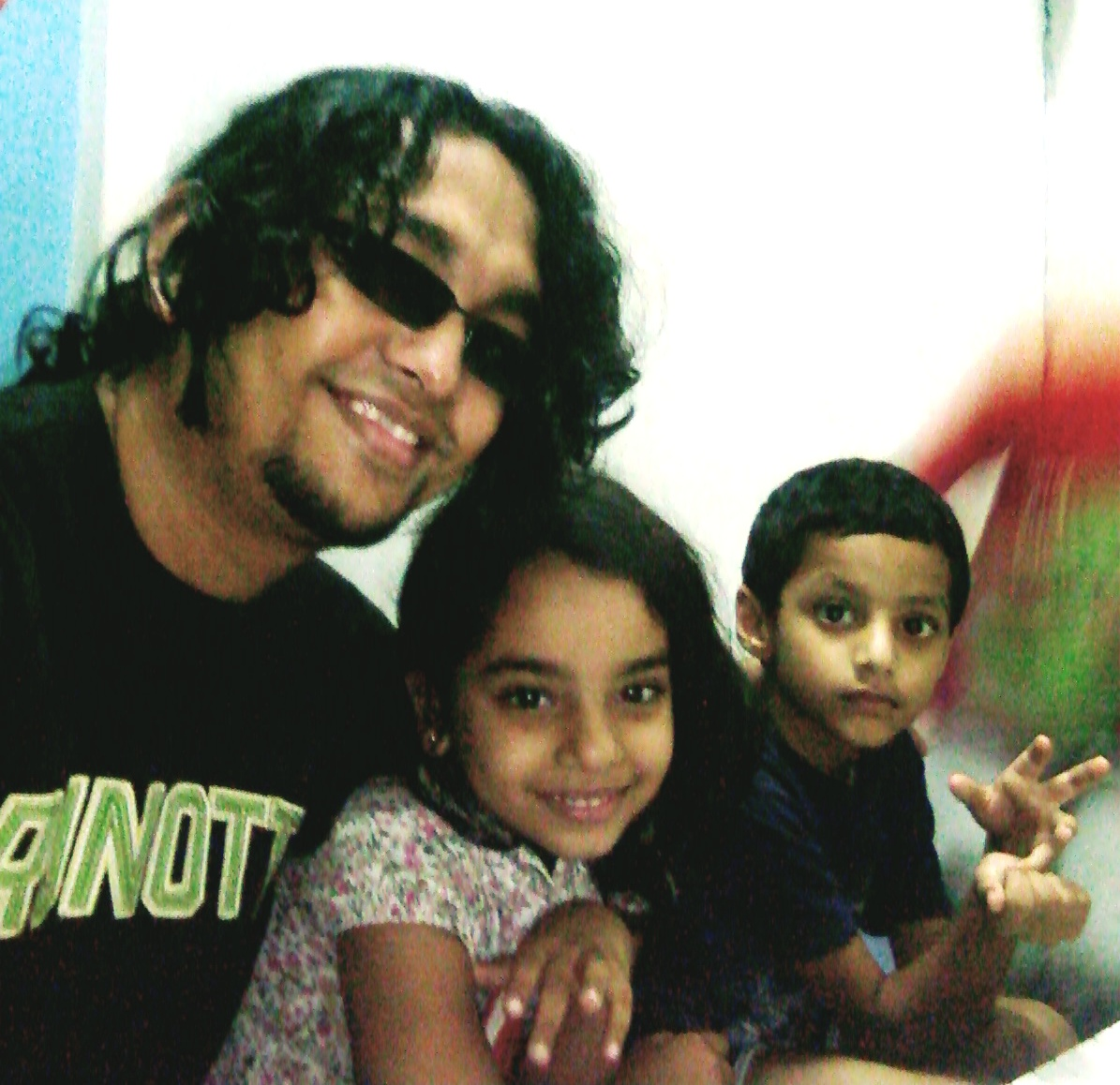
- Jim Ankan Deka with the students of Bellandur branch in Bangalore, 2008 Courtesy: Eastern Fare.com
- Established: 2007
- Director: Jim Ankan Deka
- Location: 14, Guwahati Refinery Link Road, Noonmati, Guwahati, Assam - 781020, Bangalore, Karnataka and Shillong, Meghalaya, India
- Website: www.easternfare.in

The Eastern Fare Music Foundation is a music school, as well as a production and publishing house in Guwahati, Assam, India. The institute provides training for instrumental music in Western Classical music, Carnatic music and contemporary style. It was first founded in Bangalore in 2007. In 2016, the institute started its branches in Guwahati and Shillong. The branches in North East India provide classes in dance and Indian classical music.

== History ==
It started early in 2007 with Assamese musician Jim Ankan Deka. In today's date the institute has six branches in the states of Karnataka, Assam and Meghalaya and provides training to over a thousand students. In 2009, Eastern Fare Music Foundation opened a club for the music enthusiasts known as Eastern Fare Music Club, which includes a library, a jamming room, two semi acoustic music studios and a discussion room.

== Faculty ==
Jim Ankan Deka, founder and director of Eastern Fare Music Foundation, is a music composer, singer, songwriter, music arranger, documentary film maker, photographer, guitarist, keyboardist, sound engineer and Editor-in-chief of EF News International. Anand Pilakkat, formerly a student of the Eastern Fare Music Institution is now a music composer. Suchin Ravi a former student of Eastern Fare Music Institution is a lead guitarist for various bands including Eastern Fare. Ankur Deka is a Master of Musicology (postgraduate) in Indian Classical Music. He is also a singer, songwriter, composer and a keyboard player and has been composing music for forty years in various languages including Assamese, English, Hindi and Mizo. Currently he is overseeing the branches in Assam and Meghalaya. Ashok Singha is a solo guitarist and joined EFMF in 2010. Girish Sood is a guitarist and an Engineer by profession.

== Students ==
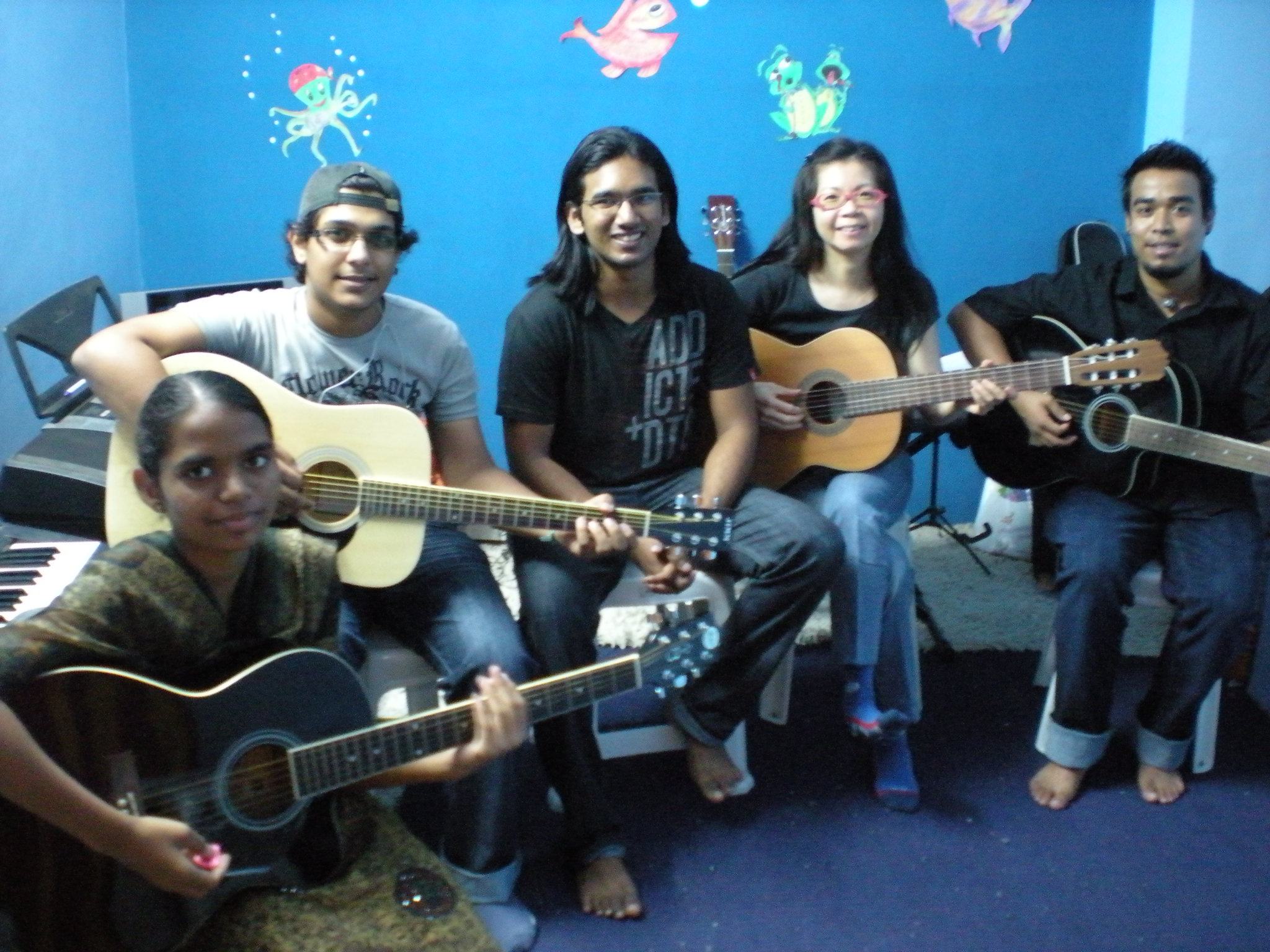
Students of Eastern Fare Music Foundation at the Koramangala Branch, 2010

The students of Eastern Fare Music Institution have been performing in various shows (international and national), composing music for albums, films, jingles and TV shows. Every year a lot of students from Bangalore and other parts of the world join the Eastern Fare Music Foundation for music education. In the year 2009, Shreya Krishnaswamy topped in Bangalore by scoring 98% in the Trinity Guildhall practical examination. Out of 5 (five) students appeared in the exam, all passed and got above 90%. In 2010, out of 19 students who appeared for Trinity Guildhall theory exam, 14 (fourteen) got distinction (87% and above) and 4 (four) got merit. Nafeesa Fathima topped in Bangalore with an outstanding 98%. The age of students range between 4 years and 80 years.

== Courses ==
Eastern Fare Music Institution provides courses for classical, plectrum, bass and acoustic Guitar (Western Music and Contemporary Music), Piano (Western Classical and Jazz), Keyboard (Western and Contemporary Music), Carnatic vocal and Veena. Students are trained to appear in both theory and practical graded examination from Trinity Guildhall. Students can apply for only theory course offered from Trinity Guildhall.

== Festivals ==
=== Euphony ===
Founded in 2009 by Eastern Fare Music Foundation, the 'Euphony' music festival is a collaborative artist retreat for emerging young professionals and celebrated artists, held annually at the end of each summer and winter in Bangalore and Guwahati. Mainly two events are held every year - 'Euphony - a winter nocturne' in January and 'Euphony - a summer serenade' in August.

=== Music Malt Online Fest ===
Founded by Eastern Fare Music Foundation under the Music Malt subsidiary, Music Malt Online Fest offers music video makers, directors and musicians an online platform to showcase their music videos. Every year October, three videos are chosen for Song of Substance, Creative Genius and The Dream Weaver awards. There are also ten consolation prizes. The festival started in 2013.

== Eastern Fare Subsidiaries ==
=== Eastern Fare Production House (Eastern Fare Productions) ===
Eastern Fare is equipped with a state-of the art Jamming room and two Semi-Acoustic Studios to develop the expressive potential of the students besides encouraging their technical know-how of music. The studio is also available for commercial services like composing and arranging musical scores for Solo Songs, Albums Television and Film Production, Voice Over recording and editing. Since 2010, EFMF is involved in production of Documentary films and Short Films. So far EFPH has produced two documentaries – "Nagaland – journey through the choir of clouds" (director: Jim Ankan) and "Shillong – a short documentary" (director: Jim Ankan), and a short film, "Uninvited" (director: Parmita Borah). In 2012, Eastern Fare produced Timeless, an album by Jim Ankan Deka.

=== Music Malt ===
Music Malt (previously known as EF News International) is a popular music and culture related portal published by Eastern Fare Music Foundation team. It was first published on 1 August 2011. Citizens journalists and photographers from around the world regularly contribute news, articles and photographs to the portal. Music Malt conducts different festivals regularly which includes Music Malt Online Fest which started in 2013.

=== ChaiTunes ===
An initiative of Eastern Fare and Music Malt, ChaiTunes is a music project where musicians of various genres collaborate to produce different musical creations. These creations are shared with the world through a series of music videos viewable on the internet. The music videos are produced by Jim Ankan Deka under Eastern Fare Productions. Musicians like Queen Hazarika, Antara Nandy and Rupam Bhuyan have joined the initiative.

=== Skrybble Web Studio ===
In 2011, Eastern Fare Music Foundation started its subsidiary Skrybble Web Studio. Skrybble mainly conducts creative writing workshops for children and adults in its Koramangala centre in Bangalore and provides various services like website designing and development, SEO, social media, PR, and corporate training.

=== Eastern Fare Publishing House ===
A subsidiary of EFMF, Eastern Fare Publishing House was launched in 2011. The publishing house's first book 'Elandhu' was inaugurated on 25 December 2011 in Guwahati, Assam. 'Elandhu' (The Smut) is a collection of Assamese short stories by writer Nalini Prava Deka. The book was released by litterateur Lakshmi Nandan Bora at the 'Kamrup Mahanagar Jila Sahitya Shabha' at Dispur, Guwahati.

== Eastern Fare (acoustic rock band) ==
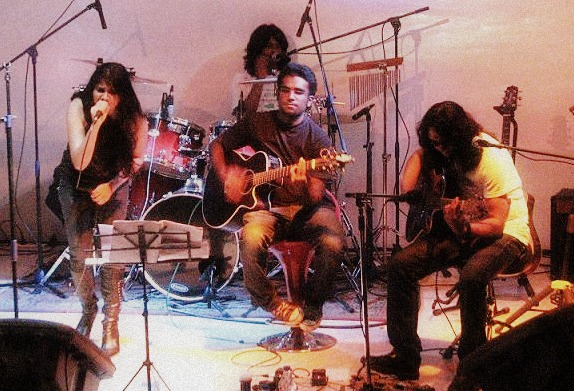
Eastern Fare performing at the Kyra Theater, 2009

Eastern Fare Music Foundation started an acoustic rock band named Eastern Fare in 2009. The band consists of Siddharth Tanti and Faheeda Fahad on Vocals, Jim Ankan Deka on Lead Guitars, Suchin Ravi on Rhythm Guitars, Anand PM on Keyboards and Bass and Sharan on Drums. Some of their original compositions are "Least Liked Best", "Personally Your's", "How Else Can We Sing This" and "Horizon in My Eye".

== Philanthropy ==
=== Count Your Blessings (CYB) ===
Count Your Blessings, a philanthropic initiative by Eastern Fare Music Club was established in October 2010. The members of this initiative focus mainly on blood donation camps, donation to non-profit organizations, visiting slum areas and giving aid, giving education to underprivileged children and visiting senior citizens home and orphanage.

== North-East India Page on Facebook ==
An initiative of Eastern Fare Music Foundation, the North-East India page on Facebook was founded in July 2009. With regular updates and facts about the North Eastern Corner of India, the page also focuses on and puts forward travel destinations and esteemed North Eastern Personalities to a worldwide audience.

=== North-East Through My Eyes photo contest ===
In 2012, Eastern Fare in association with the North-East India page on Facebook started a yearly photo contest – North-East Through My Eyes. The theme of the contest is North-East India.

== See also ==
- Music of India
- Music of Assam
