= Samiran Barua Ahi Ase =

- Directed by: Prodyut Kumar Deka
- Written by: Manoj Kumar Goswami
- Screenplay by: Prodyut Kumar Deka
- Produced by: Arc Lights
- Starring: Tapan Das; Brajen Bora; Madhusmita Borkotoki; Mrinal Das etc
- Cinematography: Ratul Barman
- Music by: Atanu Bhuyan
- Release date: 30 March 2012
- Running time: 80 minutes
- Country: India
- Language: Assamese

Samiran Barua Ahi Ase is a 2012 Indian Assamese-language political film directed by Prodyut Kumar Deka and produced by Deka and Mrinal Das under Arc Lights. It is based on a story by journalist Manoj Kumar Goswami. The music was composed by journalist Atanu Bhuyan. The film released in 2012 revolves around the realization of a leader of a terrorist organization and consist of an Anthology of four short stories revolving around him. It is a first attempt of making an anthology films in Assamese cinema.

== Story 1 ==
In the first story “Prize”, Samiran Barua, the leader of an extremist organization, has just entered the state by crossing the border. The police and state are hard upon his trail, as it would be a prize catch. Superintendent of Police, Barman is one such desperate man. Meanwhile, Samiran roams around the city feeling completely lost.

== Story 2 ==
In the second story “Nila O Nila”, the story goes into flashback during the time of college life of Samiran. There was once love in the life of Samiran in his youth. But after he left home and love forever, his beloved Nila married a wealthy man. She is now very happy, but the thought of Samiran still haunts her and the horror that if he returns one day.

== Story 3 ==
In the third Story “Encounter”, the media are doing their best to sell their papers. However, the Editor of a new local paper knows that only the name of Samiran Barua sells these days. So they make a plot to exploit his name by publishing facts on him whether it is true or fabricated. The desperate Editor goes a step further by even trying to publish a fake encounter of Samiran Barua in their paper.

== Story 4 ==
In the final Story, “Dispur”, a desperate political party is planning to bring Samiran Barua to join their party so that their party gets a new facelift and their fortune revives once again. Frustrated unemployed youths want Samiran Barua to give them AK 47 rifles so that their problems are solved. A top militant leader, who is now arrested, is also pinning his last hopes on Samiran. Each and every one of the society expect something from Samiran Barua. But he is yet to take a decision.

The film was released on 30 March 2012. It got an official entry in the 18th Kolkata International Film Festival in 2012.

== Cast ==
- Tapan Das
- Brajen Bora
- Madhusmita Borkotoki (Introducing)
- Mrinal Das
- Baharul Islam
- Nilakshi Devi

=== Special cast ===
- Indra Bania
- Bidya Rao
- Sanjeev Hazarika
- Mridul Bhuyan

== See also ==
- List of Assamese films of the 2010s
