= Borosi =

- Directed by: Prodyut Kumar Deka
- Written by: Dinesh Goswami
- Screenplay by: Pabitra Kumar Deka
- Produced by: Debashish Goswami
- Starring: Taufique Rahman; Jowan Dutta; Madhusmita Borkotoki etc
- Cinematography: Ratul Barman
- Music by: Debashish Goswami
- Release date: 18 April 2014
- Running time: 90 minutes
- Country: India
- Language: Assamese

Borosi is a 2014 Indian Assamese-language suspense film directed by Prodyut Kumar Deka and produced by Debashish Goswami under Manjushree Films & Entertainment. It is based on a story written by politician and former Law Minister of India Dinesh Goswami. It was released on 18 April 2014.

== Cast ==
- Taufique Rahman
- Jowan Dutta
- Madhusmita Borkotoki
- Nayan Prasad
- Mallika Sharma
- Kajori Konwar

== See also ==
- List of Assamese films of 2014
