= Pranjal Bharali =

Indian film producer (c.1960–2020)

- Born: c. 1960
- Died: 18 February 2020 (aged 60)

Pranjal Bharali (c. 1960 – 18 February 2020) was an Indian businessman and film producer from Assam. He produced Assamese films.

== Biography ==
Besides film producing Bharali was involved in the construction business. He produced films like Antaheen Jatra, Maa Tumi Ononya, Suren Suror Putek and Junda Iman Gunda.

Bharali died on 18 February 2020 at Nemcare Hospital in Guwahati at the age of 60.

== Selected filmography ==
- Antaheen Jatra (2004)
- Maa Tumi Ononya (2004)
- Suren Suror Putek (2005)
- Junda Iman Gunda (2007)
