= Roopkar =

Assamese film magazine

- Founding editor: Pabitra Kumar Deka
- Categories: Film magazine
- Frequency: Monthly, now yearly
- Founded: 1975
- Company: Roopkar Prakashan
- Country: India
- Based in: Guwahati
- Language: Assamese

Roopkar was the first Assamese language, tabloid-sized magazine about Assamese cinema, theater and culture. Established in 1975, the magazine was founded and edited by journalist and humor writer Pabitra Kumar Deka. Advisers of the magazine were famous singer & composer Bhupen Hazarika and writer Nirode Choudhury.

The magazine existed till the early 1990s and later revived from 2025, in its fiftieth year.

== Magazine publishing ==
Roopkar was published on a monthly basis. It was the most popular entertainment magazine in the Northeast; it also instituted the first popular film awards Roopkar Awards in Assam in 1975.

Many young journalists contributed to the magazine, including Assamese film critic Apurba Kumar Das, Kamal Lochan Das, Shekharjyoti Bhuyan, Rejek Ali Ahmed, Utpal Datta and Arun Lochan Das. The Kolkata correspondent for the magazine was Nitai Ghosh. Besides cultural reporting, writers such as Padma Borkotoki and Lakshmi Nandan Bora wrote social novels for the magazine. Bhupen Hazarika and Lakshmi Nandan Bora wrote the columns Anyamat and Brittor Bahirot respectively.

In 2025, to commemorate fifty years of publication of Roopkar, the magazine was revived by Prodyut Kumar Deka, son of Pabitra Kumar Deka, who announced it would be published annually as a Special issue

== Roopkar Award ==
The Roopkar Award was instituted in 2011 in the memory of its founder Pabitra Kumar Deka. It is given yearly to one distinguished personality in the field of stage, cinema and media.

=== Roopkar Award winners ===
- 2011 – Ratna Oza: Writer and stage director
- 2012 – Tapan Das: Actor, director, and short story writer
- 2013 – Munin Barua: Film director and playwright
- 2014 – Arun Lochan Das: Film journalist
- 2015 – Sashi Phukan: Publisher and editor of Bismoi Magazine
- 2016 – Nayan Prasad: Actor and stage director
- 2017 – Samarendra Narayan Dev: Film and stage director
- 2018 – Tapan Das: Still photographer and founder of PVTI
- 2019 – Jahnu Barua: Film director
- 2020 – Arun Nath: Film and stage actor
- 2021 – Pranjal Saikia: Film and stage actor
- 2022 – Mridul Gupta: Film director
- 2023 – Utpal Datta: Film critic, writer and short filmmaker
- 2024 – Sanjeev Hazorika: Film and stage actor and director

== Book publishing ==
Roopkar Prakashan, the publisher of the magazine, also published a few books. Roopkar Prakashan was revived in the 2020s.

=== Books published by Roopkar Prakashan ===
From 1975 to 1995

- Bordoloi, Nirmal Prabha. Samipeshu., poetry
- Bordoloi, Nirmal Prabha. Antaranga., poetry
- Gogoi, Pulok. Hoimontika., novel
- Deka, Pabitra Kumar. Asomor Satuta Dosokar Chalachitra., cinema

From 2020 to Present

- Deka, Pabitra Kumar. Mur Satya Anna Sansthanor Kahini., humour
- Roopkaror Shrestha Golpo., short story collection
- Deka, Prodyut Kumar. The Big Sleep., novel
- Deka, Prantik. Past Revisited., cinema
- Datta, Utpal. Kapurusar Taruwal., novel
- Borah, Pallabi. Ramavijaya., mythology

== 100 years of Indian Cinema ==
On the occasion of 100 years of Indian cinema, Roopkar celebrated the occasion by instituting Roopkar Film Festival (RFF), which was held from April 21 to 23, 2013 at the Rudra Barua Auditorium, Jyotichitrabon Complex in Guwahati where the cinematic heritage of the Indian film industry was showcased. Some of the master pieces crafted throughout the century by some of the tallest figures of the fraternity from Satyajt Rays' Nayak to Ramesh Sippy's Sholay were screened. The festival also published a book on cinema essay titled Chalachitra-Samoi-Samaj-Nandanttwa edited by Utpal Datta for the occasion.
