= Junda Iman Gunda =

- Directed by: Chandra Mudoi
- Written by: Bhaben Borah
- Screenplay by: Chandra Mudoi
- Produced by: Pranjal Bharali; Chabi Bhoralee
- Starring: Bikram Rajkhowa; Angoorlata
- Music by: Dr. Hitesh Baruah
- Production company: Gargee Entertainment Pvt. Ltd
- Distributed by: R.B. Films
- Release date: 7 September 2007
- Country: India
- Language: Assamese

Junda Iman Gunda is a 2007 Assamese language romantic comedy film starring Bikram Rajkhowa and Angoorlata in the lead. The film was directed by Chandra Mudoi and released on 7 September 2007. The songs from this movie received good appreciation, including one by Debojit Saha. The film was a blockbuster.

== Cast ==
- Bikram "Biki" Rajkhowa as Junda
- Angoorlata as Jeenu
- Abdul Mazid
- Bhaskar Bora
- Adhar Das
- Juri Sarma
- Madhurima Choudhury
- Minu Bania
- Seema Mudoi
- Kalpana Kalita
- Swagata Barua
- Chhabi Bharali
- Manjula Sarma Deka
- Nabanita Baruah

== Soundtrack ==
Junda Iman Gunda

Soundtrack album by Dr Hitesh Baruah
- Released: 21 January 2007
- Recorded: 2006
- Genre: Feature film soundtrack
- Language: Assamese
- Label: NK Production
- Producer: Pranjal Kumar Bhoralee; Chabi Bhoralee

Dr Hitesh Baruah chronology
Suren Suror Putek (2005)	Junda Iman Gunda (2007)

The music of Junda Iman Gunda was composed by Dr. Hitesh Baruah. It was released on 21 January 2007 by NK Production in cassette and CD formats. It marked the debut of Debojit Saha (winner of Sa Re Ga Ma Pa Challenge), Krishnamoni Chutia, Neha Bhasin (winner of Coke [V] Popstar and former lead vocalist of girl band Viva), and Zublee as playback singers for the Assamese film.

Tracklist
No.	Title	Artist(s)	Length
1.	"Xirot Xendur Loba"	Zubeen Garg, Mousumi, Jinti, Zublee	5:24
2.	"Ohh Mure Jaan"	Debojit Saha, Zublee	4:12
3.	"Gaore Horu Horu Poduli"	Zubeen Garg, Jinti, Zublee, Neha Bhasin, Gargi	5:31
4.	"Lajuki Lajuki Aijoni"	Debojit Saha	4:45
5.	"Koinajoni Beautiful"	Debojit Saha, Zublee	5:05
6.	"O Mama"	Krishnamoni Chutia, Banjyotshna, Neha Bhasin	4:46
7.	"Xirot Xendur Loba (Male Version)"	Zubeen Garg	5:25
8.	"Rib Rib Ke"	Zubeen Garg, Tarali Sarma	4:54
9.	"Bisarisu Mathu Ebar"	Zubeen Garg
10.	"Morom Noir Parote" (Extended Version)	Zubeen Garg, Sagarika	8:10

Note

- Track 8, 9 and 10 are Bonus Track and was not featured in the film.

== See also ==
List of Assamese films of the 2000s
