= Queen Hazarika =

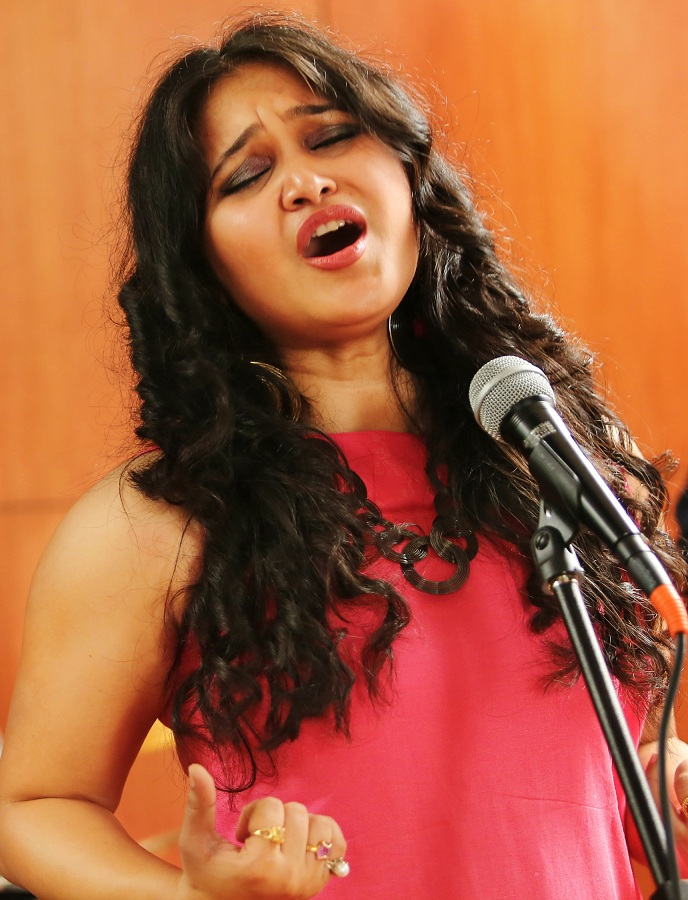
- Queen Hazarika at a video shoot in Bangalore (2015)
- Born: Queen Hazarika; 16 October 1976 (age 49); North Lakhimpur, Assam, India
- Occupations: Singer, actress
- Children: Mahin; Kavin
- Parent(s): Rajen Hazarika; Usha Gogoi Hazarika
- Musical career
- Genres: Pop; easy listening
- Instrument: Vocals
- Years active: 1996–present
- Website: www.queenhazarika.com

Queen Hazarika (born 16 October 1976) is an Indian playback singer and actress from Assam. She has sung for Assamese films like Hiya Diya Niya Garam Botaah, Mon, Suren Suror Putek and Sneh Bandhan. She is the recipient of Rotary Young Achiever Award in 2013. In the same year she was nominated for Prag Cine Awards in the Best Female Playback category.

== Early life and career ==
Hazarika was born in Lakhimpur, a small town in Assam to Raj Hazarika and Usha Gogoi Hazarika. She studied in St. Mary's High School in North-Lakhimpur and later graduated from Handique Girl's College in Guwahati. She developed interest in different art forms like music and acting from a very early age and gave her first stage performance at the age of four.

Hazarika has acted and sung in a number of Assamese and Bengali films. She has lent her voice to numerous documentaries produced by Doordarshan, All India Radio and UNICEF among others. She also hosted TV shows for channels like DY 365, Focus NE and News Live. In 2012, Queen received her first acting offer in an Assamese film Surjasta from the film director Prodyut Kumar Deka.

One of her collaborative works with Antara Nandy, Jim Ankan Deka and Ritwika Bhattacharya, Aawaz - speak up against sexual violence, won many national and international awards at different film and music festivals.

== Awards and honors ==
- Rotary Young Achiever Award in 2013
- Nominated for Prag Cine Awards in the Best Female Playback category in 2013

== Filmography ==
| Year | Film | Language | Credited as | | | | |
| Year | Film | Language | Playback singer | Actor | Composer | Director | Producer |
|---|---|---|---|---|---|---|---|
| 2000 | Hiya Diya Niya | Assamese | Yes | | | | |
| 2001 | Garam Botaah | Assamese | Yes | | | | |
| 2002 | Mon | Assamese | Yes | | | | |
| 2005 | Suren Suror Putek | Assamese | Yes | | | | |
| 2006 | Sneha Bandhan | Assamese | Yes | | | | |
| 2011 | Aakash Chuboloi Mon | Assamese | Yes | | | | |
| 2013 | Surjasta | Assamese | | Yes | | | |
| 2015 | Avataran | Assamese | | Yes | | | |
| 2015 | Okosmat – out of the blue | Assamese | Yes | | | | |

== Discography ==
- Sobi
- Swargadeo
- Shakti
- Abhiman

== Music videos ==
- Anuron (2017)
- Xaare Aasu (2015)
- Aawaz-speak up against sexual violence (2013)
- Mur Andhar Nishar

== Singles ==
- Mur Andhar Nishar (2003)
- Aawaz - speak up against sexual violence (2012)
- Ki Naam Di Matim (2012)
- Xaare Aasu (2015)
- Anuron (2016)

== TV shows ==
- Dil Ka Connection (NE TV)
- Your Request Our Pleasure (NE TV)
- Songs on Demand (NE TV)
- Good Life (News Live)
