= Dristi =

- Directed by: Prodyut Kumar Deka
- Written by: Rabindranath Tagore
- Screenplay by: Utpal Dutta and Prodyut Kumar Deka
- Starring: Nayan Saikia; Priyanka Bhargav; Lonishree Das; Chetana Das; Hiranya Das
- Release date: 2016
- Running time: 90 minutes
- Language: Assamese

Dristi (দৃষ্টি, The Vision) is an Assamese language film made for television directed by Prodyut Kumar Deka and produced by Nandan Deka for Upkar Entertainment in 2016. "Dristi" is the first Assamese film based on a story of Rabindranath Tagore, screen adaptation by film critic Utpal Dutta and Prodyut Kumar Deka.

The film was premiered in Prag News Channel on 8 May 2016 on the occasion of Rabindra Jayanti, the 155th birth anniversary of Rabindranath Tagore.
