= Surjasta =

Surjyasta
- Theatrical release poster
- Directed by: Prodyut Kumar Deka
- Written by: Jitumani Bora
- Produced by: Rosy Bora
- Starring: Angoorlata; Mridul Chutia; Tapan Das; Himangshu Prasad Das; Queen Hazarika
- Cinematography: Suraj Duwarah
- Music by: Kishore Giri
- Release date: 17 May 2013
- Country: India
- Language: Assamese

Surjasta (lit. 'Sunset') is a 2013 Indian Assamese-language narrative feature film directed by Prodyut Kumar Deka. The story of the film was written by journalist Jitumani Bora and scripted by Chandan Sarma. It is based on child psychology and extra-marital affairs. The film was released on 17 May 2013 in India. It was produced by Rosy Bora and certified U (unrestricted) by the CBFC.

== Cast ==
- Angoorlata
- Mridul Chutia
- Tapan Das
- Queen Hazarika
- Kulada Kumar Bhattacharya
- Himangshu Prasad Das
- Debojit Mazumdar
- Pranjit Das
- Rodali Bora (Child artist)

== Awards and nominations ==
Mridul Chutia and Angoorlata was nominated for Vivel Filmfare Awards 2013 (East) in the Best Actor Male and Female category

== See also ==
- List of Assamese films of the 2010s
