= Dhunia Tirutabur =

- Directed by: Prodyut Kumar Deka
- Written by: Prodyut Kumar Deka
- Screenplay by: Prodyut Kumar Deka
- Produced by: Arc Lights
- Starring: Bidyut Chakrabarty; Trisha Saikia; Barsha Rani Bishaya; Nayan Saikia etc
- Cinematography: Tulu Boro
- Edited by: Kaju
- Music by: Angaraag Mahanta
- Release date: 9 January 2009
- Running time: 9 reels
- Country: India
- Language: Assamese

Dhunia Tirutabur is a 2009 Indian Assamese movie directed by Prodyut Kumar Deka and produced by Prodyut Kumar Deka & Pankaj Kalita under Arc Lights. Music was composed by Angarag Papon Mahanta. It was released on 9 January 2009 coincide with the short film Lakhimi and Abhimani Mon. It received three Assam State Film awards in 2010 in the category of Best Director, Best Editor and Best Make Up.

== Cast ==
- Bidyut Chakrabarty
- Trisha Saikia
- Barsha Rani Bishaya
- Nilakshi Devi
- Ankur Bishaya
- Barnali Poojari
- Nayan Saikia
- Konki Bordoloi

== Special cast ==
- Jatin Bora
- Sanjeev Hazarika
- Indra Bania
- Nayan Prasad

== Plot ==
Borgohain, a journalist of repute, was traveling to the countryside for a break. When his car breaks down in the middle of a rainy night, a nearby mechanic comes to fix it. Learning his identity, the mechanic has a request of his own. He has been pining for a beautiful maid, who had accompanied a film unit during shooting at the countryside. She was a personal helper to a leading actress, who incidentally has vanished from the film industry. Borgohain agrees to look for her out of curiosity. More of a love story than a traditional mystery, his investigation takes him across the world of show business and make believe people.

== See also ==
- List of Assamese films of the 2000s
