= Jim Ankan Deka =

Indian musician

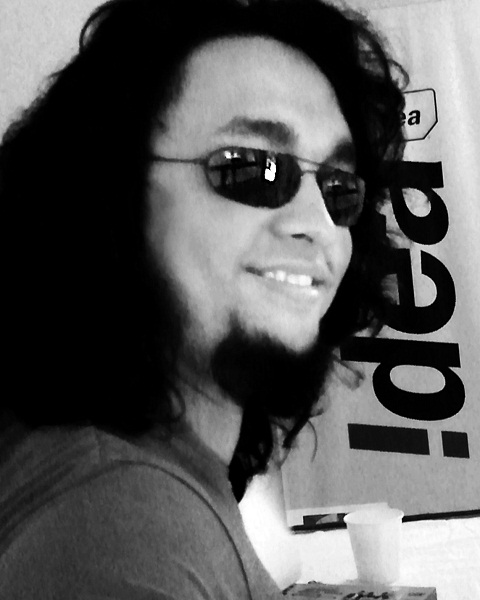
- Jim Ankan Deka at Idea Rocks India, Bangalore (2013)
- Born: Jim Ankan Deka; 1 June 1980 (age 46); Guwahati, Assam, India
- Occupations: Singer, songwriter, documentary filmmaker, photographer, record producer
- Spouse: Parmita Borah
- Parent(s): Bhabananda Deka; Nalini Prava Deka
- Awards: Renault Free The Music Award (2015); Global Music Award (2014)
- Musical career
- Genres: Pop; acoustic rock; easy listening; rock
- Instruments: Vocals; piano; guitar
- Years active: 1998–present
- Labels: The Orchard Music, Believe Music, Bombay Tracks LLP, Biscoot Records LLP, Songdew, Indiearth, Muslate
- Website: withjim.in

Jim Ankan Deka (born 1 June 1980) is an Indian musician, documentary film maker, photographer and director of Bangalore based organisation and music school Eastern Fare Music Foundation. He is the first person from Assam to open a music institute and a production house in Bangalore, India. He won multiple awards for his song Aawaz - speak up against sexual violence based on the 2012 Delhi gang rape incident. He is the frontman of the folk-fusion band FolkAGeet.

== Biography ==
=== Early life and education ===
Deka started playing the guitar from the age of three. His initial training was in Borgeet and Khol.

=== Early career ===
Deka started his career in music at the age of 18 with his first album Prahar: Tumi Kowa Kothabor with an Assamese band Prahar. With his performance as a guitarist, bass guitarist and keyboardist in numerous concerts, events and TV shows, Deka made a name for himself in the music industry of Assam. In 2001 Deka founded a studio in Guwahati named La-Jiazz which was closed in 2006. Deka is a member of the band Voodoo Child in Assam.

=== Music career ===
Since 1998, Deka has been composing and arranging music for albums, TV series, documentaries, short films and ad jingles. Till 2012 he has composed music for six albums in various languages including English, Hindi, Assamese, Mizo and Goalporia. At present he is a member of Veenar, a jazz fusion band and Eastern Fare, an acoustic rock band in Bangalore. He is the guitarist and music producer for Tunetellers, an ensemble from Guwahati, Assam. He was the guitarist and keyboardist for the band Voodoo Child from 2005 to 2016.

== Works and projects ==
=== Photography ===
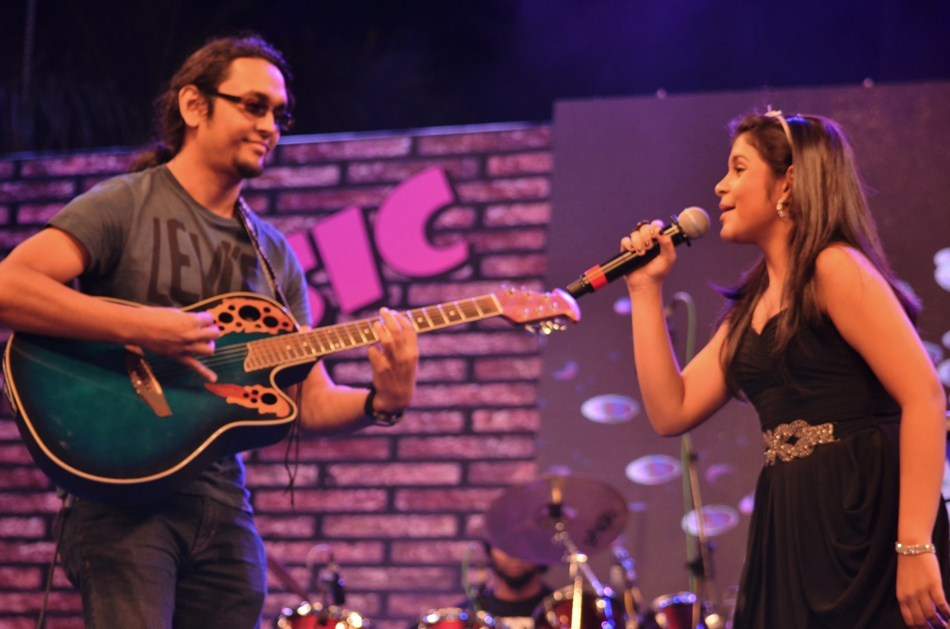
Jim Ankan Deka and Antara Nandy at a concert in Bangalore (17 November 2012)

Deka has been involved in concert and event photography since 2006.

=== Eastern Fare Music Foundation ===
Deka left for Bangalore in 2006 and founded the ace music institute Eastern Fare Music Foundation. Eastern Fare opened a club Eastern Fare Music Club in 2009 and a recording studio Eastern Fare Music Studio.

In 2010, Eastern Fare Music Foundation opened a production house in Bangalore called Eastern Fare Productions. Deka directed two short documentaries, Nagaland: Journey through the choir of clouds and Shillong under the same production house. The production house also produced a short film and two music videos.

In 2012 Deka opened a branch of Eastern Fare in Guwahati.

=== OK North East ===
In 2017, Deka co-founded a travel information and activity center for North-east India called OK North East in Guwahati with branches in Umiam and Bangalore. The company took up projects to bring foreign tourists to not very well known to unexplored places in the North-east. The company has been taking up tasks to help villages in the North-east through the means of sustainable development along with providing training on soft skills to the villagers.

== Honors and awards ==
| Year | Awarded by | Award | Nominated work |
|---|---|---|---|
| 2013 | Mumbai Shorts International Film Festival | Best Music Video | Aawaz – speak up against sexual violence |
| 2014 | Hollywood Shorts Reel-14 | Best Music Video | Aawaz – speak up against sexual violence |
| 2014 | Noida International Film Festival | Best Music and Best Music Video | Aawaz – speak up against sexual violence |
| 2014 | Global Music Awards | Bronze Medal | Aawaz – speak up against sexual violence |
| 2015 | Songdew | Renault Free The Music Award | In recognition of outstanding contribution to indie music |
| 2016 | Fabindia and Songdew | Weave Your Sound | Eastwards |

Deka has been invited as a guest and judge for some of the major music competitions and events in India. Some of the notable events where Deka was invited as a judge were Ananya '10 at Kammavari Sangha Institute of Technology (KSIT), 12th Inter Collegiate Youth Fest at Channabasaveshwara Institute of Technology (CIT), Spring Fest at Indian Institute of Technology Kharagpur (IIT), Alcheringa at Indian Institute of Technology Guwahati (IIT), Rock Hammer at Indian National Autocross Championship (INAC), Consensio at Royal Group of Institutions and Idea Rocks India Talent Hunt,.

== Discography ==
| # | Album name | Language | Year |
|---|---|---|---|
| 1. | Prahar – Tumi Kowa Kothabor | Assamese | 1998 |
| 2. | Saayaan | Hindi | 1999 |
| 3. | Mor Ei Dekh | Assamese | 2000 |
| 4. | Friendship | English | 2001 |
| 5. | Goalporia Lokageet (Goalporia Folk Songs) | Goalporia | 2005 |
| 6. | Tomaloi | Assamese | 2006 |
| 7. | Timeless | Multilingual | 2012 |
| 8. | EastWards | Instrumental | 2015 |
| 9. | Funked | Instrumental | 2020 |

== Single compositions ==
=== English ===
- "Ticking Clock" (Jimmy Thang) (2022)
- "Moving On" (Catherine Khiangte) (2020)
- "Assam Skies" (Featuring Char Seawell, Catherine Khiangte) (2019)
- "Little Love Little Peace" (Featuring Rittique Phukan (Voodoo Child)) (English) (2017)
- "How Else Can We Sing This" (for the band – Eastern Fare) (English) (2010)

=== For ChaiTunes Project ===
- "Assam Skies" (Featuring Char Seawell, Catherine Khiangte, Karen Weed) (English) (2019)
- "Niyoror Xur" (Featuring Mayukh Hazarika) (Assamese) (2019)
- "Anuron" (Featuring Rupam Bhuyan, Queen Hazarika) (Assamese) (2016)
- "Aakaxok Subo Khojo" (Featuring Antara Nandy) (Assamese) (2015)
- "Xaare Aasu" (Featuring Queen Hazarika) (Assamese) (2015)

=== Other languages ===
- "O' Ajon" (Featuring Maitrayee Patar, Rishan Doley) (Mising) (2022)
- "Nixobdo Nilim" (Assamese) (2014)
- "Aawaz – speak up against sexual violence" (Featuring Ritwika Bhattacharya, Queen Hazarika, Antara Nandy) (Bilingual) (2013)
- "Tere Bin Nahi Lagda" (Featuring Ritwika Bhattacharya) (Hindi) (2012) (tribute to Nusrat Fateh Ali Khan)
- "Bidaai Dilo Bidaai" (Featuring Ankur Deka) (Assamese) (2012)
- "Ganga" (Featuring Ritwika Bhattacharya) (Hindi) (2012) (tribute to Dr. Bhupen Hazarika)
- "Samajavaragamana" (Featuring Suchethan Rangaswamy) (Sanskrit) (for the band – Veenar) (2010)
- "Saviganasu" (Kannada) (composed only the guitar part for the theme song of a Kannada serial) (2010)

=== Featured tracks ===
- "Eastwards feat. Suchethan Rangaswamy" (instrumental) (Featured in the albums Timeless; Heritage Hues – Music That Celebrates India by Songdew; 'Strings Attached' by Music Aloud.)

== Music videos ==
| Year | Title | Music | Artist | Director |
|---|---|---|---|---|
| 2019 | Assam Skies | Jim Ankan Deka, Char Seawell | Char Seawell, Catherine Khiangte | Tarunabh Dutta |
| 2017 | Anuron | Jim Ankan Deka | Queen Hazarika, Rupam Bhuyan | Tarunabh Dutta, Debjani Hazarika |
| 2015 | Aakaxok Subo Khojo | Jim Ankan Deka | Antara Nandy | Parmita Borah |
| 2015 | Xaare Aasu | Jim Ankan Deka | Queen Hazarika | Parmita Borah |
| 2014 | Nixobdo Nilim | Jim Ankan Deka | Jim Ankan Deka | Parmita Borah |
| 2013 | Aawaz – speak up against sexual violence | Jim Ankan Deka | Ritwika Bhattacharya, Antara Nandy and Queen Hazarika | Parmita Borah |
| 2012 | Tere Bin Nahi Lagda | Jim Ankan Deka | Ritwika Bhattacharya | Parmita Borah |
| 2012 | Xobdor Porisoy | Jim Ankan Deka | Jim Ankan Deka | Parmita Borah |

== Documentaries ==
| Year | Title | Role | Note |
|---|---|---|---|
| 2010 | Shillong | Director, Music Composer | Short documentary |
| 2011 | Nagaland – journey through the choir of clouds | Director | Short documentary |

== Television series ==
| Year | Title | Role | Director/Music Director | Language | Channel |
|---|---|---|---|---|---|
| 2006 | Balidaan | Music composer and background score | Narayan Sil (Director) | Hindi | Doordarshan |
| 2010 | Saviganasu | Guitarist for title song | Bharath BJ (Music director) | Kannada | Kasturi (TV channel) |

== Short films ==
| Year | Title | Role | Director | Language |
|---|---|---|---|---|
| 2011 | Uninvited | Music composer and background score | Parmita Borah | English |
