= Voodoo Child (band) =

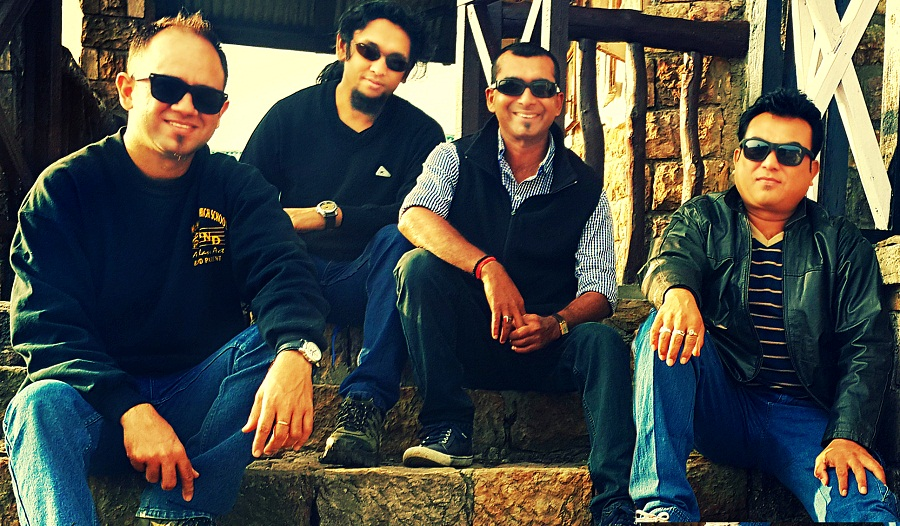
- Voodoo Child (2015)

Background information
- Origin: Guwahati, India
- Genres: Classic rock, Rock and roll
- Years active: 2002–present
- Label: Independent
- Members: Rittique Phukan; Jim Ankan Deka; Rajib Hazarika; Bobo Bardoloi
- Website: www.voodoochild.co.in

Voodoo Child is a rock and roll band from Guwahati, Assam, India. The band is primarily made up of Rittique Phukan (guitar/vocals/drums/songwriter), Jim Ankan Deka (keys/guitar), Rajib Hazarika (lead guitar), Priyanku Bordoloi ( Guitars) and Bobo Bardoloi (bass), although they frequently team up with session musicians (on drums, guitar, bass, organ and other backup instruments) when on tour.Pankaj Rajkhowa who is a Bangalore bassed musician does plays as a session Bassist during tour in South India.Pankaj Rajkhowa was a full time Bassist with The band from 2002 to 2006. The band has released 3 full-length albums: We Own the Night, 20 Years on the Road, and Underneath the Stars, and 7 singles so far.

== History ==
Voodoo Child is a Guwahati-based classic rock band, which came together in 2002. The band has performed many concerts in Northeast India and in other parts of the country. The band has gone through a few line-up changes since its inception because of alternative careers of band members.

Phukan was the founder of the band and came up with the name Voodoo Child in 2002. Amborish Saikia (ex member of Euphoria and KK) joined as the lead guitarist. Although Phukan used to play the drums along with vocals, later Tanmoy Ray Choudhury (present drummer of Angaraag Mahanta and Papon and The East India Company) joined as the drummer and Phukan concentrated on vocals and rhythm guitar. In 2005 Deka joined the band as the keyboardist, Pankaj Rajkhowa as the Bassist and David Goldsmith as the other vocalist.

In 2015, the line up changed to the present set up.

Voodoo Child has played in almost all the top clubs of Assam and some parts of Northeast India. The band also performed at different clubs and pubs in Delhi, Bangalore, Goa and other parts of India.

== Festivals and events ==
Voodoo Child has performed at many festivals and events including Shine A Light in Cherrapunji, World Music Day in Guwahati etc. The band opened for Danish pop/soft rock band Michael Learns to Rock on 13 December 2015 at the Indira Gandhi Athletic Stadium in Assam. This was the first time an international band had performed in Guwahati.

== Albums ==
We Own The Night (2017)

20 Years on the Road (2020)

Underneath The Stars (2021)

== Singles ==
- Typical Love Song (2014)
- Good Die Young (2014)
- Little Love, Little Peace (2014)
- Taqi Song (2014)
- Your World Below (2015)
- Nights Go By (2015)

== Band members ==
- Rittique Phukan (Vocals, Rhythm guitar, songwriter, Drummer)
- Jim Ankan Deka (Lead guitar, Keyboard)
- Priyanku Bordoloi (Guitars)
- Rajib Hazarika (Lead guitar)
- Bobo Bardoloi (Bass)

== Ex members ==
- Pankaj Rajkhowa ( Bass )
- Ambarish Saikia ( Guitar)
- David Goldsmith ( Vocals )

== See also ==
- Music of India
- Indian rock
