= Kaliram Medhi =

Indian linguist (1880–1954)

- Born: 18 October 1880; Ramdia village, Kamrup district, Assam
- Died: 24 January 1954 (aged 73); Guwahati, Assam
- Education: MA in physics
- Alma mater: Calcutta University
- Occupations: Administrative officer, writer, essayist
- Writing career
- Language: Assamese

Kaliram Medhi (18 October 1880 – 24 January 1954) was a prominent linguist, writer and essayist from Assam who wrote in both the Assamese and English languages in the early part of modern Assamese literature. He was the third president of the Asom Sahitya Sabha in 1919 held at Barpeta. He was honoured with the Rai Bahadur title in 1946. Versatile Assamese short story writer and Professor of Physics and later a lifetime associate at Assam Engineering College Surendra Nath Medhi better known by his pen name Saurav Kumar Chaliha was his son and noted Mathematician, Emeritus Professor of statistics at Gauhati University and Institute of Advanced Study in Science and Technology Jyotiprasad Medhi was his grandson as he was the son of his daughter Kadambari Medhi and her husband Binandi Chandra Medhi.

== Early life ==
Medhi was born on 18 October 1880 at Ramdia village near Hajo of Kamrup district to Bhukali Medhi and Sontara Medhi. After primary education at his village he did his higher education at Guwahati and City College of Calcutta.

== Career ==
He died in Panbazar, Guwahati on 24 January 1954. His son Surendra Nath Medhi (1930-2011) became a famous Assamese writer under the pseudonym Saurabh Kumar Chaliha and was awarded Sahitya Academy Award in Assamese in 1974.

== Literary works ==
In Assamese

1. Asomiya Bhasar Mul (অসমীয়া ভাষাৰ মূল) (1918),
2. Asomiya Byakoron aru Bhasatatta (অসমীয়া ব্যকৰণ আৰু ভাষাতত্ত্ব) (1936),
3. Mahapurush Sankardevar Bani (1949)
4. Ankawali (Part-I) (অঙ্কাৱলী) (১ম ভাগ) (1950),
5. Prahlad charitra (প্ৰহ্লাদ চৰিত্ৰ) (1913) and more.

In English

1. The Kalitas,
2. Brajavali Literature of Assam,
3. Philosophic Aspects of the Assamese Brajavali Literature,
4. Origin of Assamese Drama,
5. Studies in the Vaishnav Literature and Culture of Assam.
6. Assamese Grammar and Origin of the Assamese Language.

== See also ==
- History of Assamese literature
- List of Assamese writers with their pen names
