= Aawaz – Speak Up Against Sexual Violence =

"Aawaz - speak up against sexual violence"

Single by Jim Ankan Deka
- Released: June 2013
- Recorded: 2013
- Genre: Rock, Pop
- Length: 5:20
- Label: Eastern Fare
- Songwriters: Jim Ankan Deka, Ritwika Bhattacharya, Parmita Borah
- Producers: Jim Ankan Deka, Parmita Borah

Jim Ankan Deka singles chronology
"Xobdor Porisoy" (2012)	"Aawaz - speak up against sexual violence" (2013)	"Nixobdo Nilim" (2014)

"Aawaz – speak up against sexual violence" is a song written by Jim Ankan Deka, an Indian musician and documentary film maker. The lyrics are penned together by Jim and singer Ritwika Bhattacharya. Sa Re Ga Ma Pa L'il Champs (2009) finalist Antara Nandy has rendered her vocals along with Ritwika and Queen Hazarika.

== Background and writing ==
Jim and Ritwika had originally composed the song for a rally in Bangalore in 2012 following the death of the Delhi gang rape victim. The song is all about asking people to speak up against sexual violence.

== Video ==
The video of the song is directed by Parmita Borah. The video includes three short stories dealing with violence against single as well as married women and child abuse.

== Accolades ==
Awards
Year	Award	Category	Recipients and nominees	Result
2013	Mumbai Shorts International Film Festival	Best Music Video	Jim Ankan Deka and Parmita Borah	Won
2014	Hollywood Shorts Reel-14	Best Music Video	Jim Ankan Deka and Parmita Borah	Won
2014	Noida International Film Festival	Best Music	Jim Ankan Deka	Won
2014	Noida International Film Festival	Best Music Video	Jim Ankan Deka and Parmita Borah	Won
2014	Global Music Awards	Bronze Medal	Jim Ankan Deka	Won
