= Niranjan Goswami =

Actor and mime artist

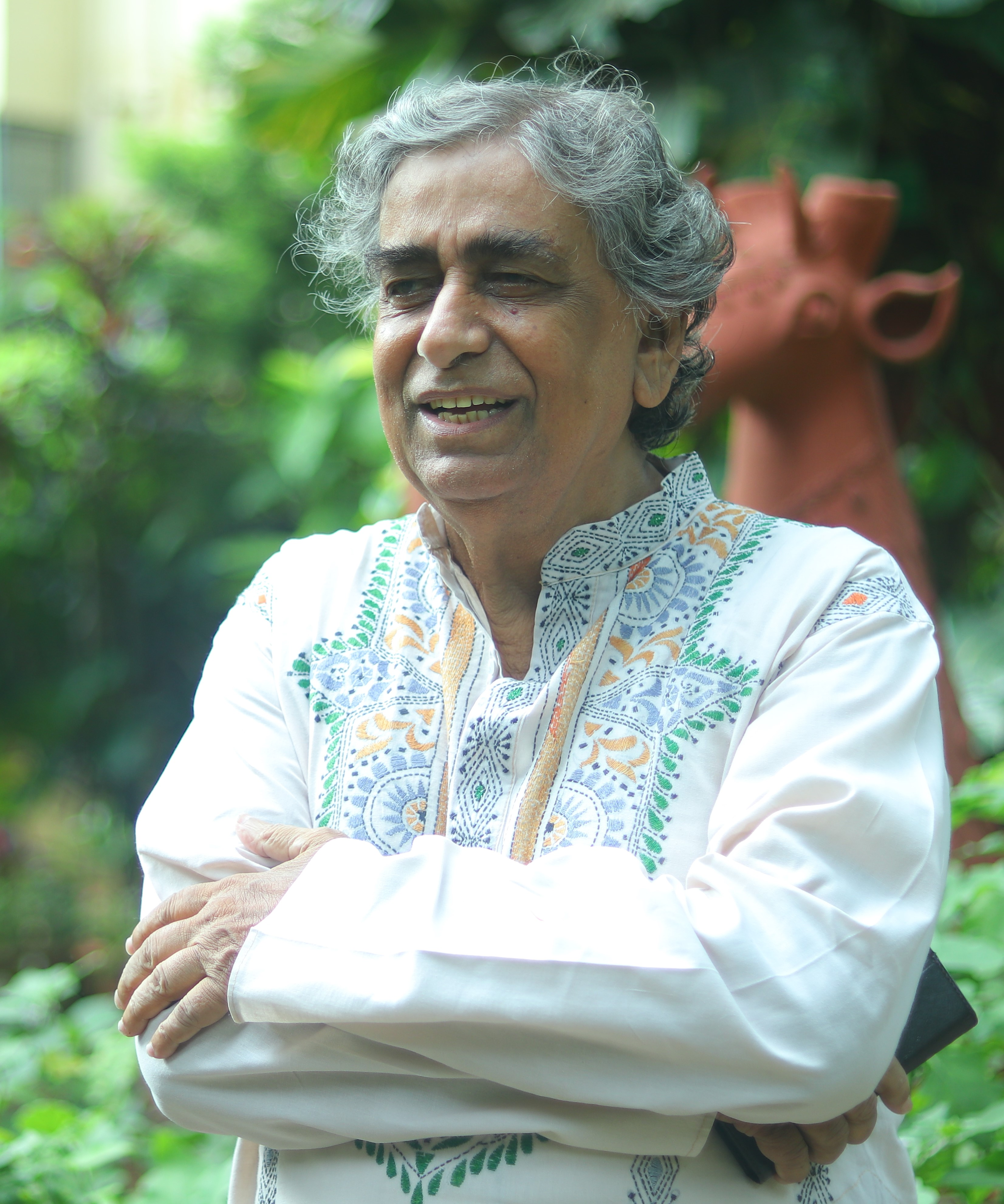
- Born: Dhaka, Bangladesh
- Occupations: Mime artist Stage director
- Known for: Mime [ Mukabhinaya]
- Awards: Padma Shri Sangeet Natak Akademi
- Website: mimeindia.in

Niranjan Goswami is an Indian mime artist and stage director, credited by many with pioneering the art form of mime in India. He is the founder of Indian Mime Theatre, a group promoting the art of Mukhabhinaya (silent acting).

== Career ==
He started his career in the late 1960s with Bahurupi, a local theatre group, but later joined Rabindra Bharati University for a course in theatre. In 1976, he founded Indian Mime Theatre for promoting mime and has performed on many stages in India and abroad. He is a visiting professor at the National School of Drama (NSD) and many other theatre institutions. He received the Sangeet Natak Akademi Award in 2002. The Government of India awarded him the fourth highest civilian honour of the Padma Shri, in 2009, for his contributions to Arts.
