= Antaheen Jatra =

2004 film

- Directed by: Munna Ahmed
- Written by: Mamoni Raisom Goswami; Dulal Roy
- Produced by: Pranjal Bharali; Chabi Bharali
- Starring: Nipon Goswami; Bishnu Kharghoria; Tapan Das; Zerifa Wahid
- Cinematography: Suman Duwarah
- Edited by: Shivaji Chowdhury
- Music by: Dr Hitesh Baruah
- Production company: Gargi Entertainment Co. (Pvt) Ltd
- Release date: 2004
- Country: India
- Language: Assamese

Antaheen Jatra is an Assamese language film directed by Munna Ahmed. The film is based on a story by Jnanpith Award winner Mamoni Raisom Goswami. The film was screened at the Calcutta International Film Festival along with films from France, Czechoslovakia, China, Portugal, Vietnam, Canada, Norway, Italy and Bangladesh.

== Casts ==
- Nipon Goswami
- Bishnu Kharghoria
- Tapan Das
- Prastuti Porasor
- Zerifa Wahid
- Shantichaya Roy
- Atul Pachani
- Taufique Rahman
- Baharul Islam
- Antara Chowdhury
- child-artiste Gargi

== Soundtrack ==
Antaheen Jatra

Soundtrack album by Dr Hitesh Baruah
- Released: 2004
- Recorded: 2004
- Genre: Feature film soundtrack
- Language: Assamese
- Label: Gargi Entertainment Co. Pvt. Ltd.
- Producer: Pranjal Kumar Bhoralee; Chabi Bhoralee

Dr Hitesh Baruah chronology
Maa Tumi Ananya (2003)	Antaheen Jatra (2004)	Suren Suror Putek (2005)

The soundtrack of the film was composed by Dr. Hitesh Baruah. Unliked his previous ventures, it only has three instrumental songs "Literature Masterpiece", "Writing Novels" and "Mamoni's Award Winning". Baruah reused few songs "Sunday Holiday Closing Day", "Kun Khorogor Jui" and "Morom Noir" from the film Maa Tumi Ananya as per the director's request, however, it did not feature in the film and only appeared in the soundtrack album. This was Baruah's second film as a music director.

Antaheen Jatra (Original Motion Picture Soundtrack)
No.	Title	Singer(s)	Length
1.	"Priya O Priya" (Sunday Holiday Closing Day)	Zubeen Garg, Sagarika, Kalpana Patowary	5:37
2.	"Kun Khorogor Jui"	Zubeen Garg, Tarali Sarma	5:32
3.	"Morom Noir"	Zubeen Garg, Shanta Uzir	7:34
4.	"Literature Masterpiece" (Background Score)	Dr. Hitesh Baruah	1:34
5.	"Writing Novels" (Background Score)	Dr. Hitesh Baruah	1:00
6.	"Mamoni's Award Winning" (Background Score)	Dr. Hitesh Baruah	1:12

Note

- Tracks 1 to 3 do not appear in the film.

== See also ==
- Assamese cinema
