= Nalini Prava Deka =

Indian writer (1944–2014)

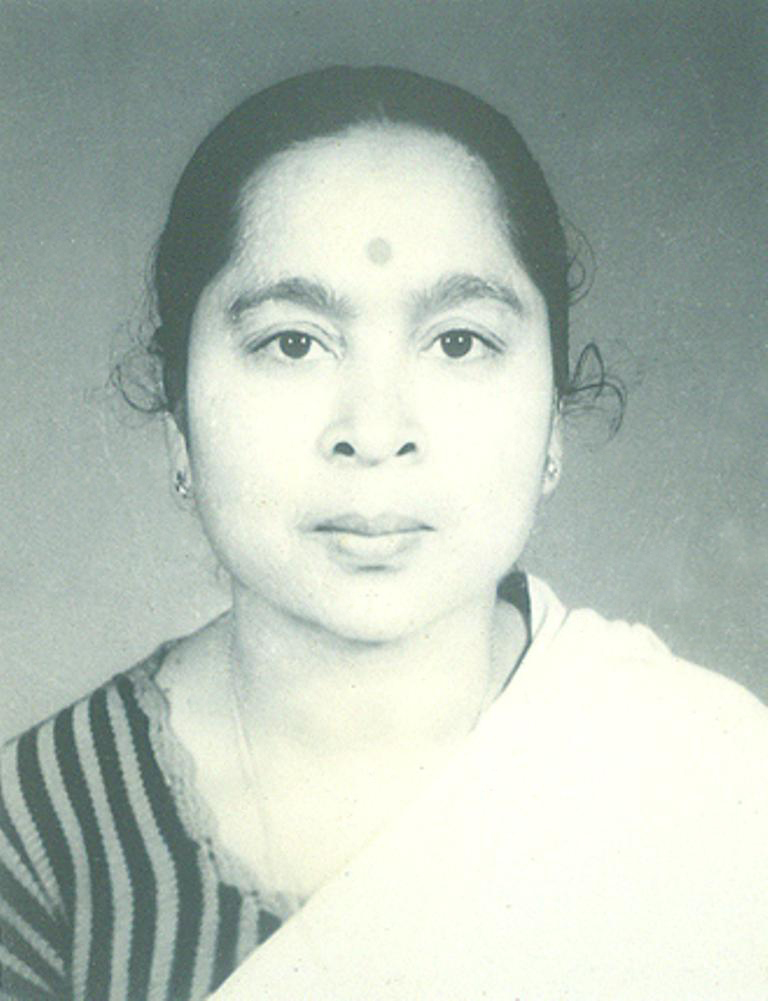
- Born: 11 March 1944 Assam, India
- Died: 15 June 2014 (aged 70) Guwahati, India
- Occupation: Author, poet, storyteller, playwright, social activist, feminist
- Years active: 1964–2014
- Spouse: Bhabananda Deka
- Children: Ankur Deka, Arnab Jan Deka, Jim Ankan Deka

Nalini Prava Deka (11 March 1944 – 15 June 2014) was an author, poet, storyteller, actress and playwright from Assam, a state in India encompassing the Brahmaputra Valley. She was honoured at a 2012 gathering in Ledo by the Assam Sahitya Sabha (Assam Literary Society). Deka promoted Assamese heritage, traditional customs, weaving and fabric art, cooking and folk music with her husband, Bhabananda Deka. They researched traditional Assamese lifestyle, art, literature and culture. Deka was the first female editor and publisher of a children's magazine, Phul (Flower), and wrote 30 critically praised books. All India Radio broadcast Deka's radio plays on issues related to women and children.

According to the Assam Tribune, Deka has "been like an institution to our society" and "has contributed immensely to the cultural and economic spheres of our state". Dainik Sankarjyoti, an Assamese daily published in Guwahati, described how she played a significant part in nurturing the traditional indigenous Assamese lifestyle and social ethos by promoting indigenous Assamese weaving traditions (maintaining taat xaal—hand looms for weaving mekhela sadawr and suriya chapkawn) and dheki (traditional Assamese crop grinders for rice and pithaguri. Deka died on 15 June 2014 in Guwahati. ChaiTunes released a music video as a tribute.

== Traditional Assamese lifestyle ==
A poet, Deka inculcated the legacy of Assamese culture and heritage in her children. She set up an indigenous Assamese traditional hand loom (taat-xaal) at her homes in New Delhi and Guwahati to produce hand-woven fabrics and garments. Deka wore her hand-woven mekhela-sadawr and wove suriya-sapkawns for her husband to wear. She set up a crop-grinding tool (dheki) at home, using it to producing her family's food from organic herbs. Raw paddy, including rice, wheat and lentils, was ground to produce traditional Assamese food and snacks such as saul, kumawl saul, bora saul, sira, aakhoi and xandawh. Deka demonstrated self-reliance, even in the city.

== Author ==
Deka wrote and edited a total of 30 books, mostly in Assamese. Some of her writing, including short stories, have been translated into English. Deka's books have been reviewed by Maheswar Neog, Bhupen Hazarika, Pramod Chandra Bhattacharya, Sheelabhadra, Rammal Thakuria, Bhabananda Deka, Bisweswar Hazarika and Kanak Chandra Deka. She had a cordial relationship with Bhupen Hazarika and Mamoni Raisom Goswami (Indira Goswami), and Hazarika wrote an article about one of her books. A compilation by Deka and her husband entitled Sahityik Dampati Adhyaksha Bhabananda Deka–Nalini Prava Deka was introduced on 4 December 2014 in Guwahati. Another book (An Extraordinary Assamese Couple, about Deka and her husband) was introduced on 28 February 2015 by Dutch scientist and author Constantin Aurel Stere.

She wrote three short-story collections, including 2011's Elandhu (Smut, with some English-language stories) and Ebigha Mati (A Plot of Land) (1990). Deka's short stories emphasized brotherhood and religious tolerance. Many of her poems were played and sung by Assamese musicians and singers. Deka began editing a popular children's magazine, Phul (Flower), in 1987 and printed and published the magazine for several years on her own printing press.

== Playwright ==
Deka was a popular Assamese first-generation female radio playwright in Assam since the early 1970s. Her plays centered around issues concerning women and children, and many were broadcast on All India Radio from Guwahati. Deka acted in some of her radio plays and onstage.

== Social activist ==
Deka was a leading social activist in Assam and played a role in the establishment of national and international organisations, including the Srimanta Sankardev International Foundation, Assam Foundation–India, Delhi Asomiya Sahitya Samaj, Sadou Asam Moina Parijat, Kamrup (undivided) District Sahitya Sabha, Sadou Asam Chemoniya Chora, Pub–Sarania Naamghar, Rajgarh Sahitya Chora, Pohar Proyasi Mohila Samiti, Urvashi Kristi Kendra and Urvashi Sangeet Vidyalay. She was the founding president of Purbanchaliya Mohila Parishad, the female wing of a regional political organisation in Northeast India. Through these organisations, Deka promoted Assamese heritage, culture and literature all over the world and began a social renaissance through female empowerment and religious tolerance. Her effort to create a social awakening in Assam inspired the song, "Xare Aso" ("We Are Awake").

== See also ==
- List of Indian writers
