= Pabitra Kumar Deka =

Indian writer and film critic (1940–2010)

Pabitra Kumar Deka (29 January 1940 – 5 January 2010) was a progressive writer, columnist, publisher and editor of monthly magazine Roopkar, film critic and screenwriter of the State of Assam in India. He is the winner of the Best Film Critic Award in 1988 from the Eastern India Motion Picture Association. The Government of Assam has instituted the State Best Film Critic Award in the name of Pabitra Kumar Deka Award from 2010 after his death.

== Early life and education ==
He was born in the small town of Haibargaon in the district of Nagaon (Assam) to Shri Mahendra Nath Deka and Swarnalata Deka. Mahendra Nath Deka, son of Durgaprasad Deka, a farmer from village Kampur, was a government officer in the Veterinary Department. The family settled in Guwahati in the early 1960s as Mahendra Nath Deka was transferred to the then capital city Shillong and later to Guwahati. After his retirement from office, Mahendra Nath Deka started M.N. Deka Films, a film distribution company, which released many Assamese and Bengali films in the seventies.

Pabitra Kumar Deka attended Nagaon Government High School and earned a degree in Commerce from Nowgong College. During his college days, he acted in and directed a number of one-act and full-length plays in Nagaon. In All Assam One-act play competitions held in Nagaon Natya Mandir, he received best actor and best director awards for plays like Kudubahot Jui (1958), Fatik Mahajonar Dukan (1959), Adarsha Homeo hall (1960) and Mara Sutir Jiya Saku (1960), all written by eminent dramatist and professor Deba Kumar Saikia, who also received the best dramatist award for the same plays.

During the same period, he began to translate short stories of foreign writers in Assamese for the magazines Manideep and Nabajug. His first published work was an Assamese adaptation of Edgar Allan Poe’s story published in Manideep.

== Middle years: Roopkar & Aikyatan ==
In Guwahati, Deka joined Assam Tribune group of Newspapers as Advertisement Manager in 1965 till the late eighties. After that, he joined the new Sadin-Pratidin group and remained there till his death in 2010.

In the 1960s, Deka worked additionally as Associate editor of the magazine Amar Pratinidhi, published from Kolkata by Shree Bhumi Publishing Company and edited by Dr. Bhupen Hazarika. He became famous for his column ‘Dhananjayor Diary’ in Amar Pratinidhi in which he wrote many humorous critiques of society and people. Some of the satirical writings were later published in the form of two books namely Dhananjayor Diary and Mora Manuh Bosabar Upai in the 1970s.

He wrote and translated many social and science fiction novels during this period, some of which were also published in the form of Sihote Sar Paise, Vietnam, Mexicor pora aha gabhorujani, Operation Momba, Frankenstein etc. Deka also wrote many humor articles for the magazine Cartoon, edited by famous painter and filmmaker Pulak Gogoi, another Shree Bhumi publication.

From 1975, Deka shifted his focus to film and theatre. He published and edited a film and cultural magazine called Roopkar, the first of its kind in the Northeast India., which was published till early 1990s.

Simultaneously, he founded an amateur theatre group called Aikyatan where he produced plays for two decades, including Janani, Surjastak, Sinhasan Khali, Panchatantra, Hewers of Coal, Upahar, Night of 16th January, Putala Ghar etc. Many young artists and technicians who belonged to this group are now established names in Assam today. A music school named Aikyatan Sangeet Vidyalaya was also started in the premises of the club for providing Hindustani classical vocal and tabla and western guitar, violin and mandolin classes. Besides Aikyatan, he was also closely associated with IPTA, Assam chapter.

In the field of literature, Deka wrote a regular humor and satire column called Rasheswar Hazorikar Tukabahi for the Assamese weekly Asom Bani under the pen name of Rasheswar Hazarika in late 1970s and early 1980s.

== Progressive literature ==
During the 1960s and 1970s, Deka was drawn to leftist thoughts and activities. In 1967, he along with Gobind Chandra Gogoi and Amal Barua, employees of the Assam Tribune group published a progressive magazine called Samakalin edited by Amulya Barua and later Padma Borkotoki. After the magazine closed down, Deka along with Nitya Bora published and edited a little magazine called Naxa in 1970 where the chief adviser was Dr. Hiren Gohain. The magazine Naxa was controversial at that time and also ceased publication after a few years. During this period, he also started an amateur theatre group called Naxa Natya Parishad where he produced plays, including Maxim Gorky’s Enemies, Surjahara and Bertolt Brecht’s Maa. The play Maa based on Gorky’s novel ‘Mother’ was staged in 1974, with music direction by Dr. Bhupen Hazarika. People's Art Theatre of Kolkata performed some of their plays in Assam under Naxa Natya Parishad in the seventies.

== Film critic and script writer ==
Deka joined the Sadin-Pratidin group of newspapers in the late 1980s as the Cultural Editor and edited the cultural section. Besides that, he wrote columns for the daily papers Ajir Batori, Dainik Agradoot and the film journal Chitra Sambad. He wrote two film related books, Bhabendra Nath Saikiar Chalachitra and Satuta Dosokor Asomiya Chalachitra, a history on Assamese cinema.

Deka formed the Assam Cine-Journalist Association in the 1990s, and was its president until his death. Film and theatre conferences, press meetings, seminars, film shows, and other events were regularly held in the office of the Association, situated in his own residence.

During this time, he wrote many scripts for films, including Surjya Tezor Anya Naam, Hastir Kanya (Winner of National Award in 1997 for Best Biographical Film), Jakham, Tyag etc. and TV serials like Aie Saharate, Tadanta, Dhaniramor Dhan, Sahu Aie, Hanumanor Sadhu, Nishar Nayak, Sir etc.

He was also associated with All India Radio, Guwahati during 1960s and 1970s where he interviewed many prominent personalities like filmmaker Mrinal Sen, Dr Bhabendra Nath Saikia, singers Usha Mangeshkar, Rita Kothari Ganguly, etc. for AIR.

== Mobile theatre of Assam ==
Deka was closely involved with the Mobile Theatre of Assam. He wrote several plays including Thikana, Rajat Drohi, Overcoat, Naginir Amrit Danshan, ET (Adaptation of Steven Spielberg’s film), Laila Majnu, Dr Bezbarua, Godfather (Adaptation of Coppola's film), which were performed by groups like Kohinoor Theatre, Hengool Theatre, Rajashri Theatre, Sankardeb Theatre and Bordoloichila Theatre. Deka was one of those people who promoted the Mobile theatres in his magazine Roopkar to increase its intellectual acceptance and prominence among the classes. Today the Mobile theatre is a huge industry, employing thousands of people in Assam.

== Later years ==
Deka began to suffer from serious heart related ailments in the early 2000s. He continued to work, often receiving people from the film, stage and media for his views and help. In addition to his job for Sadin, he wrote about the history of world cinema for nearly ten years for Sambhar, a Sunday supplement published with the daily Asomiya Pratidin. The writings were later published in two big volumes published by the Assam Prakashan Parishad called Bharatia Samantaral Dharar Sobi and Bishwa Chalachitra. Apart from that, he continued his satire writings in his columns Birbolor Sinta and Soukadhaarar Semsemia Sitaan for Sadin.

On 5 January 2010, Pabitra Kumar Deka died in the GNRC hospital, Guwahati after a heart attack. The family members of late Deka have constructed an archive in his memory named Pabitra Kumar Deka Archive in 2018 in their residence at Pub Sarania, Guwahati 781003. Roopkar Award is also presented every year in his memory to a famous personality from stage, film and media.

National Award-winning filmmaker Prabin Hazarika is now all set to release his latest full-length Assamese feature film Hanumanor Sadhu, a famous satirical story written by Pabitra Kumar Deka set in the pre-independence era. The film is a remake of a TV show aired on Guwahati Doordarshan in 1994 based on the story and screenplay written by Deka himself.

== Humor ==
- Dhananjayor Diary
- Mora Manuh Bosabar Upai
- Hanumanor Sadhu
- Rosalap

== Novels ==
- Sihote Saar Paise
- Byakul Kamona

== Cinema ==
- Bhabendra Nath Saikiar Chalachitra
- Satuta Dosokor Asomiya Chalachitra
- Bharatia Samantaral Dharar Sobi
- Bishwa Chalachitra

== Children Literature ==
- Saudor Sadhu
- Ejon Biror Sadhu
- Hercules
- Mulla Nasiruddinor Golpo

== Autobiographical (Posthumously) ==
- Mur Satya Anna Sansthanor Kahini
- Roopkaror Srestha Golpo

== See also ==
- List of Assamese writers with their pen names
