= Suren Suror Putek =

- Directed by: Chandra Mudoi
- Produced by: Pranjal Bharali; Chabi Bhoralee
- Starring: Jatin Bora; Prastuti Porasor; Nishita Goswami; Chetana Das
- Music by: Dr Hitesh Baruah
- Distributed by: Gargi Entertainment Co. Pvt. Ltd.
- Release date: 10 September 2005
- Country: India
- Language: Assamese

Suren Suror Putek is a 2005 Indian Assamese language comedy drama movie directed by Chandra Mudoi. The title role is played by Jatin Bora. This is the first Assamese film to highlight the art of magic and the talented magicians of the state.

== Plot summary ==
The film revolves around the escapades of Soni (Jatin Bora), the son of a thief named Suren. Realising that he will always be looked down upon as his father's son, the youth takes to magic in a bid to achieve success and earn respect.

== Cast ==
- Jatin Bora as Soni
- Prastuti Porasor as Rose
- Nishita Goswami as Malini
- Dr Rajen Jaiswal
- Chiranjiv Mahanta
- Chetana Das
- Upasana Bhoralee
- Prabal Barthakur
- Emon Kashyap

== Soundtrack ==
Suren Suror Putek

Soundtrack album by Dr Hitesh Baruah
- Released: 13 April 2005
- Recorded: 2005
- Genre: Feature film soundtrack
- Language: Assamese
- Label: JG Electronics
- Producer: Pranjal Kumar Bhoralee; Chabi Bhoralee

Dr Hitesh Baruah chronology
Antaheen Jatra (2004)	Suren Suror Putek (2005)	Junda Iman Gunda (2007)

The music of Suren Suror Putek is composed by Dr Hitesh Baruah.

Tracklist
No.	Title	Artist(s)	Length
1.	"Ei Jaadur Nixa"	Zubeen Garg	5:00
2.	"Kaane Kaane"	Kollol Borthakur, Birina Pathak	4:10
3.	"Prem Kinu Janane"	Kollol Borthakur
4.	"Rib Rib Ke"	Zubeen Garg, Tarali Sarma	4:54
5.	"Soni Ram"	Dwipen Baruah
6.	"Krishna Krishna"	Zubeen Garg, Queen Hazarika
7.	"Title Track"	Dr. Hitesh Baruah
8.	"Morom Noir Parote" (Extended Version)	Zubeen Garg, Sagarika	8:10

== Awards ==
- Jyotirupa Join Media Award For Excellence in Film Television & Music - Best Actor in Comic Role: Jatin Bora

== See also ==
- Jollywood
