= Manoj Kumar Goswami =

Manoj Kumar Goswami (Assamese: মনোজ কুমাৰ গোস্বামী) is a journalist and writer from Assam, India. He took over as the editor-in-chief of Assamese newspaper 'Aamar Asom' on 1 June 2020. Goswami gained popularity through his story Samiran Barua Ahi Ase and thereafter he has made considerable contribution to Assamese short-story literature from the 1980s to the present. Manoj Kumar Goswami was awarded the Sahitya Akademi Award in 2022 for his collection of short stories 'Bhul Satya'.

== Early life and Literary career ==
Manoj Kumar Goswami was born on 24 July 1962 in Nagaon, Assam, India. Goswami began publishing short stories in Assamese and subsequently became known for his contribution to contemporary Assamese fiction. His published works include the short-story collections Ishwarhinata, Premhinata, Swadhinata, Samiran Barua Ahi Ase, Moi Rajen Baruak Samarthan Karo, Jiban.Com, Prithibir Shes Station and Aluminiumar Anguli. His other books include Panch Jan Bandhu, Trapezium and Rajnitir Oliye-Goliye. His travel writing includes Volta Ekhan Nadir Nam, while Anadi Aru Anyanya is among his novels.
