= Hiren Gohain =

Indian writer and social scientist (born 1939)

Professor Hiren Gohain
- Born: Hiren Gohain; 1939 (age 86–87); Golaghat, Assam, India
- Citizenship: Indian
- Occupations: Academic, Scholar, Literary critic, Social scientist
- Spouse: Rani Gohain
- Awards: Sahitya Academy

Academic background
- Education: Ph.D. MA
- Alma mater: University of Cambridge; Cotton University; Presidency College; Delhi University
- Thesis: Tradition and Paradise Lost: A Heretical View (1977)

Hiren Gohain (born 1939) is an Assamese polymath, scholar, writer, literary critic, and social scientist from the Indian state of Assam.

== Academic life ==
Gohain studied in Cotton College, and did his graduation from Presidency College, Calcutta and then moved to Delhi University to pursue his post-graduation in English literature. After completion of his master's degree, for some time, he became a lecturer in Kirori Mal College of Delhi University. Later, he went to the Cambridge University for doctoral research on the topic 'Paradise Lost and the 17th Century Crisis' later published as 'Tradition and Paradise Lost: A Heretical View', a work highly acclaimed for its original research and fresh perspective. After coming back from Cambridge, he became a professor at the Department of English in Gauhati University.

== As a literary critic ==
It was Gohain who for the first time brought the ideas and methods of Anglo-American New Criticism to the study of Assamese/Indian literature in Assamese. While studying in Cambridge, he had an eclectic radical ideology but later on, after his return to India, he became a Marxist. It was he who adapted the ideas of critics like György Lukács, Antonio Gramsci, and other critics into the nascent field of Assamese literary criticism. Some of his books in Assamese are Sahityar Satya, Sahitya Aru Chetana, Biswayatan, Asomiya Jatiya Jibanat Mahapurushiya Paramapara, Assam: A Burning Question and several other significant and widely read books. He has also written 4 volumes of memoirs which are also relevant for their incorporation of social and historical content. He is a contributor to journals such as Economic and Political Weekly, Frontier, and occasional publications of institutions like Indian Institute of Advanced Studies (IIAS), Centre for English and Foreign Languages (CIEFL), Shillong. He also is a columnist for various regional and national newspapers.

== Political activism ==
Gohain has been a voice of Assam as critic of Assamese national extremism, Hindutva extremism and socio-political issues.

Gohain opposed the citizenship (Amendment) Act and equated the exclusion of Muslims from the CAA purview of the as a move similar to that of the pogrom against the Jews by Nazis in Germany during World War II. Protesting against CAA, Gohain said "If the question of independence arises, if no one listens to us, the government, the state and political parties, then it’s a different thing, then we will definitely be compelled to raise the demand for independent Assam. But let’s not get carried away by temporary emotions, as citizens of India, we will fight as long as we can. If that fight is not successful, then the demand for independence will come up.” His protest attracted a case of sedition against him.

== Other contributions ==
He is also a regular contributor to Economic and Political Weekly. His book 'Assam A Burning Question' is a compilation of several essays on the socio-political crisis confronting Assam in the context of Assam Movement written in the mid-1980s, and the period dominated by extremism. Recently, he played an important role in the mediation of peace talks between the Government of India and the Assamese insurgent group ULFA. He was the founder president of the Asomiya Sahitya Sanmilani.He is a recipient of Sahitya Akademi Award for his book on Sankardev.

== Selected works & journals ==
- Tradition & Paradise lost: a heretical view (1997, English)
- Assam, a burning question (1984, English)
- On the present movement in Assam (1980, English)
- Bodo Stir in Perspective
- Nature and art in Shakespeare: an essay on Hamlet (English)
- Sahityar Satya (1970, Assamese)
- Bastabar Swapna (1972, Assamese)
- Kal Bhramar (1974, Assamese)
- Kewal Manuhar Ase Gaan (1970, Assamese)
- Samaj Aru Samalochana (1972, Assamese)
- Sristi Aru Jukti (1972, Assamese)
- Sahitya Aru Chetana (1976, Assamese)
- Kirtan Puthir Roh Bisar (1981, Assamese)
- Tejar Aakhare Likha (1982, Assamese)
- Biswayatan (1983, Assamese)
- Kabitar Bichar Aru Natun Samalochana (1986, Assamese)
- Asamiya Jatiya Jibanat Mahaapurusiya Parampara (1987, Assamese)
- Upanyasar Adhunik Samalochana (Vol. 1 & 2, Assamese)
- Adristwa Aru Asam (1988, Assamese)
- Kalasrot Aru Kandari (1995, Assamese)
- Nature and Art in Shakespeare (1988, English)
- The Magic Plant (1992, English)
- Aspects of Early 19th Century Bengalee Culture (1990, English) 23. Struggling in a time warp (2019, English)
- On Saffronisation of Education

== Awards and honors ==
- Sahitya Akademi Award in 1989
