= Bhabananda Deka =

Indian writer (1929–2006)

Bhabananda Deka 'Asom Ratna'('Jewel of Assam')
- Born: 19 August 1929; Assam, British India
- Died: 4 December 2006 (aged 77)
- Occupations: Economist, author, educationist, litterateur, heritage scholar
- Spouse: Nalini Prava Deka
- Children: Ankur Deka, Arnab Jan Deka
- Writing career
- Years active: 1943–2006
- Notable awards: Assam Government Literary Award during 50 years of India's Independence (1997) Literary Pension of Assam Government (2004) 'Asom Ratna'('Jewel of Assam') posthumous title (2007)

Bhabananda Deka (19 August 1929 – 4 December 2006) was a pioneer Assam economist and author who conducted novel research on the economy of the far eastern part of India. He is a leading Indian-Assamese litterateur of the famed 'Awahon-Ramdhenu Era' of Assamese literature during the mid-20th century. He authoredf 115 English and Assamese books including textbooks on a range of fifteen subjects including economics, ancient Assamese literature, philosophy, education, religion, mythology, archaeology, tribal study, poetry, drama, memoirs, civics, political science, biographies; he also edited books and journals. He authored a variety of research papers and articles about the state of Assam, a state in the north-eastern part of India. He pioneered the writing of books on Economics in Assamese. His Assamese book Axomor Arthaneeti was the first ever research-based comprehensive book on Assam Economics, which was published for the first time in 1963. He was conferred with the honorary title of 'Asom Ratna' -- 'Jewel of Assam' by the intellectuals of Assam on 19 August 2007 at a public meet held under the presidency of Prof. (Dr) Satyendra Narayan Goswami.

== Biography ==
=== Early life and education ===
Deka was born to Late Baliram Pathak and Late Sayatri Bala Pathak at Byaskuchi Satra, Barpeta sub division of undivided Kamrup district, Assam. He completed his graduation in Economics from Cotton College, Guwahati, in 1954 and gained a postgraduate qualification in Economics from Gauhati University in 1957. Before his graduation, he gained teaching experience by working as part-time teacher at Sarthebari High School. After graduation, he went back to hometown and worked for a year as a teacher at Chenga High School. During that period, he also served historic Byaskuchi Satra (Monastery)'s governing body 'Bhattadeb Milan Samiti' as a secretary and was instrumental in re-establishing the Satra at a new compound together with the first Library (Bhattadev Puthivoral) at Byaskuchi Satra. He served the locality by opening up an income generating mechanism for covering the running expenses of the Satra by aligning with the annual Fishery allotment of the nearby Kapla Bil, the big lake and conservatory of various fish species.

He returned to Guwahati City to resume post-graduation studies in 1955, and had to earn his livelihood while learning in the University by working as Economist at Assam State Congress office under the patronage of state Congress President and ex-Chief Minister Mahendra Mohan Choudhury. After post-graduation examinations, he worked as teacher at two schools Kamrup Academy and North Guwahati Girls' School until the results were declared. With the newly acquired MA(Economics) degree, he received the first invite from iconic litterateur and founder of Arya Vidyapeeth College Prof. Giridhar Sarma to join in his newly founded College as a professor and Head of Economics Department. From 1957, he briefly worked in Arya Vidyapeeth College before joining another similar institution Pragjyotish College.

=== Career ===
On 1 September 1958 Deka joined Pragjyotish College in the Economics Department as the professor and Head. He retired as Principal of Pragjyotish College in 1992. He was the Founder Principal of Bapujee College in Sarthebari in 1970. While he was working at Pragjyotish College, he took leave for a year and worked as a Senior Research Officer in the Language Unit of Union Public Service Commission, Delhi. He worked as Principal of 4 (four) other Graduate and Postgraduate Colleges in Assam. These Colleges were: Tamulichiga GKB College, Jorhat; Hajo BEd College, Dadara; Sarukehtri College, Borkapla and Guwahati Night College, Guwahati, Assam.

=== Intellectual & social works ===
He was one of the first Assamese to form Asomiya Sahitya Samaj in India's capital city of New Delhi along with India Government's Minister Bijoy Chandra Bhagawati, former Assam Chief Minister and Member of Indian Parliament Jogendra Nath Hazarika, Parikshit Hazarika, Upendra Nath Goswami and others in 1968. They were subservient in the introduction of Assamese Language in Modern Indian Languages (MIL) Department of Delhi University.

Deka also established Assamese Department and Bengali Department in the Indian Constitutional body Union Public Service Commission (UPSC) in New Delhi, and introduced Assamese Language as a subject and medium for appearing in all-India level Competitive Examinations conducted by UPSC to select top bureaucrats of India Government.

He also organised the Birth Centenary of the doyen of Assamese literature Lakshminath Bezbaroa in New Delhi at all India level with the cooperation of two erstwhile Presidents and two Prime Ministers of India including Dr Zakir Husain, Fakhruddin Ali Ahmed, Indira Gandhi and Morarji Desai in 1968. His English book on 'Assamese Language & Literature' published during that Centenary celebration was released on 24 November 1968 by then President of India Dr Zakir Hussain in New Delhi. The only surviving copy of this book was recovered by story-writer, novelist and river engineer Arnab Jan Deka after death of Deka, and a re-edited, enlarged 2nd Edition of the book was published by him on 4 December 2014, which was officially re-launched by London-based Chief Editor of research journal Luit to Thames. A third International Edition of this book has been published in 2015 for readers and literary historians worldwide.

Deka was a leading member of Asom Sahitya Sabha. In public recognition of his immense literary contributions, he was unanimously elected as the last President of the undivided Kamrup District Sahitya Sabha in 1982. He was the founder of Assam Economic Association, Assam Foundation-India and Srimanta Sankardev International Foundation, and a frontline advocate of the rich literary and cultural heritage of Assam all over the world. He was influenced by Sankari Culture and folk culture heritage & was known for his participation in setting up Belbari Satra and Byaskuchi Satra (Vaisnavite Monastery) in Barpeta District of Assam in India.

=== Death ===
He died on 4 December 2006 at his residence in Pub Sarania, Guwahati. Assam Legislative Assembly officially mourned his death in a special Winter Session in presence of 126 Members(MLAs) and Chief Minister with his all Cabinet Colleagues, wherein the Speaker of the Assembly presiding over the Session formally read out a Resolution in official acknowledgement of his role in propagating Assamese language and literature outside the state of Assam at all-India and international level. The Chief Minister of Assam Tarun Gogoi also officially condoled the death of Deka through a Press Statement, which was published in majority of dailies published from North East India on 5 Dec 2006. Other social organisations and individuals of prominence including: Assam Sahitya Sabha (Assam Literary Conference) under Presidency of Kanaksen Deka(Editor, Daily Agradoot), Media Trust, Assam and the International Prince Klaus Literary Award(Netherlands) winner novelist Dr Mamoni Raisom Goswami, Dr Indira Goswami, India's top literary award Saraswati Samman winner novelist Dr Lakshmi Nandan Bora, Cambridge University scholar and literary critic Dr Hiren Gohain, Nobel laureate Rabindranath Tagore Professor Dr Satyendra Narayan Goswami of Gauhati University, Chief Architect of Florida, USA, Amiya Kumar Das, singer-musician Dr Bhupen Hazarika's co-singer-sister Sudakshina Sarma and others personally visited Principal Deka's residence to condole his death by sharing grief with the bereaved family and pay their obeisance in memory of the departed soul.

== Book author ==
He authored a total 115 books, apart from many articles, essays and research papers. He wrote books on diverse subjects like classical Assamese ancient literature, philosophy, vaisnavite study, economics, Assam economy, political science, civics, education, heritage study, mythology, tribal study, poetry, travelogue, and biography.

His books have been used as textbooks and reference materials in universities in Northeast India. Some of his works, including Asomor Arthaniti (“Economy of Assam”), have been published in multiple editions. He has written on the life and works of Vaishnavite scholar Srimanta Sankardeva and his disciples, including Madhabdev, Damodardev, and Haridev, as well as on Vaishnavism and Sankari culture and philosophy. He has also translated Kirtan Ghosa, written by Srimanta Sankardeva, from Assamese into English. His English biography Sreemanta Sankaradeva covers the life and works of the scholar.

== Editor of journals and magazines ==
Deka was offered the editorship of a literary journal Ami in the year 1948 when he was an eighth standard school student at Barpeta Government High School. His foray into editing was a success, leading to more editing offers during later years in his life. Because of his love and dedication to the cause of Assamese literature, he accepted several such editing offers while he was at the peak of his professional career as a college professor and India government's bureaucrat. He jointly edited an iconic literary journal Udaygiri in 1964 while he was a college teacher. Almost all the top Assamese poets, essayists and story-writers of the time were regular contributors in this journal. He discovered several new literary talents and established them in the literary world by highlighting their works in his edited journal. His co-editor of this journal was Assamese literary critic Prof. Rammal Thakuria. He was the editor of several other literary and philosophical journals and magazines including Rastrajyoti and Gobinda. Rashtrajyoti was the first bilingual literary journal combining two of major Indian languages Hindi and Assam, and it received nationwide success for its innovative journalism.

== Critical appreciation ==
Deka's scholarly works have been critically acclaimed from early 1960s, largely in Assamese language media. Even posthumously, his literary contributions are continuously being critically evaluated. Northeast India's oldest English daily The Assam Tribune wrote about him and his works thus-- "Prof Bhabananda Deka, noted author, scholar and a pioneer economist of Assam has been credited with a plethora of scholarly books on Assam's heritage, literature, sociology, economy etc. He had always been active in projecting the motherland in all its glory through its rich legacy of literature and culture. One such marvellous work of his, the biography of Srimanta Sankardev, is actually a treasure for Indian art and literature. Prof Deka's book has beautifully encapsulated Sankardev's enriching works on every aspect of literature and art." The critical review further continued-- "The author not only emphasises on the works of Sankardev, but also on the works of the various other Sankarite scholars, past and present. Prof Deka beautifully exemplifies Sankardev's principles and teachings on how to live peacefully, despite the growing religious and racial intolerances prevalent then. I am sure that the re-publication of this book will bring Prof Bhabananda Deka's monumental work into focus, and pave the way for more extensive study and research on Sankardev, and his impact on the society at large."

The Sentinel further illustrates diverse quality of his works with this description-- "Principal Bhabananda Deka was the first Assamese economist–litterateur to initiate Assam–specific study and research of local economy and other social aspects. Apart from authoring total 115 books, he wrote in famous literary journals like Awahon, Ramdhenu, Amar Protinidhi, Manideep, Natun Asomiya, Asam Bami, Dainik Asam etc., right from mid–1950s. Just before his death on 4 December 2006 he finished English prose–translation of timeless Assamese classic 'Kirtan Ghosa' of Srimanta Sankardev." The same writing further focuses on other areas of his social activities pivotal to further propagation of Assamese literature and culture outside Assam's geographical and political boundaries-- "During his Delhi stint as senior bureaucrat, he played a pivotal role in setting up Assamese departments in the UPSC and Delhi University during 1968–69. He was instrumental in bringing Hollywood personalities to Guwahati in 1995 and subsequent production of first one-hour documentary film on life and works of Srimanta Sankardev in 1996. Because of his untiring efforts, this film was screened in the USA, Canada and other countries, and preserved in the National Museum of Switzerland. In recognition of his pioneering role as economist his death anniversary is observed every year as 'Artha Divas' or Day of Economics."

== Honors ==
Deka was the recipient of the Literary Pension (2004) and Golden Jubilee of Indian Independence Literary Award(15 Aug 1997) offered by the Government of Assam.

He was bestowed with the honorary title of Asom Ratna -- 'Jewel of Assam' by the leading intellectuals in Assam on the occasion of his 78th birthday celebrations publicly on 19 August 2007, in a programme held in Guwahati city under the presidency of Nobel laureate Rabindranath Tagore Professor of Gauhati University Dr Satyendra Narayan Goswami. A prestigious volume of compilations of tributary articles by leading scholars and some interviews of the departed scholar published during his lifetime under the name and style of Asom Ratna Principal Bhabananda Deka edited by leading Assamese poet Prof. Sushil Sarma conferring the said honorary title upon Deka was officially released in the same programme by several leading scholars jointly including Prof. Upendra Nath Sarma, Abanindra Bora, Er. Arnab Jan Deka, Prof. Biswesear Hazarika joined by the editor Prof. Sarma and president Dr Goswami. Deka was the first scholar to be conferred with this prestigious title by intelligentsia in Assam. Subsequently, Assam Government was inspired by this event to declare establishment of an 'Asom Ratna Award' in 2008 and two other fellow Assamese had been awarded including Dr Bhupen Hazarika in 2008 and Dr Mamoni Raisom Goswami in 2014.

After his demise, Pragjyotish College of Guwahati, Assam, India, has been organising Bhabananda Deka Memorial Lecture in Guwahati every year since his first death anniversary on 4 Dec 2007. The 6th edition of this Memorial Lecture series was held on 25 April 2015, wherein the former Principal of ADP College, Nagaon, Dr Ram Chandra Deka spoke about the rich qualities of Deka. Prior to the Lecture programme, floral tributes were paid on the portrait of the departed scholar as a homage to his memory.

An award-winning novel on his life titled 'Bhaba Ananda Sambad'(2007) authored by Arnab Jan Deka was published by the Assam Government through its official literary body Assam Publication Board.

A documentary film with the title 'Golden Jubilee of Assam Economics Research & the Pioneer Assam Economist-Litterateur' highlighting his pioneering role as an Assam Economist and scholar premièred on 4 Dec 2014 in Guwahati City. This film had been directed by documentary filmmaker-actor Arnab Jan Deka. The screenplay was a collaborative effort by a number of contributors, including Claire Elizabeth Terry from Barcelona, Spain, Tess Joyce from Indonesia and Terri Stiffler from the USA. Tess Joyce also rendered her voice for the background Narration in the film, which was recorded at a Studio in Jakarta, Indonesia.

Assam Foundation-India has set up an Endowment to facilitate systematic research and hold an international-level annual Oration on the social and literary contributions of Deka and his wife Nalini Prava Deka. The first Principal Bhabananda Deka & Nalini Prava Deka Endowment Oration was delivered by internationally renowned river and coastal scientist and hydraulics expert Dr Constantin Aurel Stere from The Netherlands on 28 February 2015 at Guwahati Press Club.

== Books and articles ==
=== Books in English ===
- Industrialisation of Assam (1961)
- Assamese Language & Literature & Sahityarathi Lakshminath Bezbaroa (literary history) (1968)
- Sreemanta Sankardeva (biography) (2003)
- Dimbeswar Neog – Life and Work (biography) (1999)
- Elements of Economics (1963)
- Elements of Political Science (1963)
- Elements of Indian Economics (1963)
- Studies in Economics Theory
- Element of Civics and Economics
- Elements of Political Science
- Economics
- Foundation Course
- Sankardev's Kirtan Ghosa (2006)
- Last Testament (2009)
- Bishnuram Medhi : A Political Study (PhD thesis) (2010)

=== Books in Assamese ===
- Bhattadev Pratisthapit Byaskuchi Satra (archaeology) (1955)
- Asomor Arthaneeti (Assam Economics) (1963)
- Prachin Asomiya Bhakti Sahitya Aru Dhammapada (literary criticism) (1992)
- Prabandha Bichitra (literary criticism) (1989)
- 5 Centuries Assam Economy (research papers) (2013) (compiled & edited by Arnab Jan Deka)
- Raghuvamsa (mythological story) (1971)
- Punyabhoomi Asom (essays on archaeology) (1973)
- Mahapurushar Kotha : Katha Guru Choritor Santa Mahanta (biography) (2004)
- Bhaorather Bamsa Aru Baliram Pathakar Jivan Kriti (biography) (1986)
- Amrit Putra Dhruva (mythological play) (1987)
- Dharmatatwa (religious philosophy) (2013)
- Awahon Ramdhenur Pate Pate (literary criticism) (2013) (compiled & edited by Arnab Jan Deka)
- Manimugdha (poetry) (1992)
- Mor Kobita (poetry) (2007) (compiled & edited by Arnab Jan Deka)
- Srimanta Sankardev (2015)
- Sri Sri Damodar Dev (biography) (1989)
- Bhattadev (ভট্টদেৱ) (biography) (1989)
- Mother Teresa (biography) (1996)
- Rupkonwar Aniruddha (mythological play) (1994)
- Saptarathee (mythological play) (1994)
- Udham Singh : A Martyr of India's Freedom Movement (biography) (2015)
- Bharatar Ajokoka Dadabhai Naoroji (biography) (2015)

=== Research papers & essays in English ===
- Rural Economy of Assam – (Khadi Gramodyog Commission, Bombay) (1963)
- Bhakti Ratnakar of Sankardeva (Pragjyotishiya)
- A Peep into the Economy of Guwahati (Paura Bichitra) (1978)
- Economic Condition of the Citizens of Guwahati (Paura Bichitra) (1984)
- Char Economic – Assam Information
- Need for a Change in Quality of Education (Pragjyotishiya)
- Sankardeva (Assam Tribune) (1998)
- Sankardeva as a Social Thinker (Press Information Bureau)
- Rangali Bihu : the Spring Festival of Assam (The Northeast Daily) (13 April 2000)
- Buddha
- Bargeet (2003)
- Buddhism and its Teaching (2004)

=== Research papers & essays in Assamese ===
- Brass & Bell Metal Industry in Assam (Asam Bani) (1955)
- Powers of India's President & Constitution (Ramdhenu) (1960)
- Assamese Vaisnav Religion & Humanism (Awahon) (1968)
- Employment Problems in Assam & Solutions (Amar Desh) (1969)
- Bonhomie between Families of Sankardev & Damodardev (Awahon) (1973)
- 19th Century's Economy of Assam (Dainik Asam) (1978)
- Need for Moral Planning (Notun Asomiya) (1961)
- Assam Economy During Sankardev's Times (Monideep) (1964)
- Assamese Villages (Awahon) (1965)
- Buddhism in Assam as Depicted in History of Kamrup (Awahon) (1968)
- Ways to Celebrate Assamese Spring Festival Bihu (Awahon) (1971)
- Assam's Char Economics (Janasikhsha, Assam Govt.) (1978)

== Books about Bhabananda Deka & his works ==
A series of books had been published on the life and works of Deka highlighting their intellectual and social significance, including:

- Arthanitigya-Sikshabid-Sahityik Adhyaksha Bhabananda Deka (edited by Arnab Jan Deka) (2006)
- Asomor Arthaniti Chorchar Baatkotiya Adhyaksha Bhabananda Deka (authored by Arnab Jan Deka) (2007)
- Jewel of Assam Principal Bhabananda Deka (edited by Arnab Jan Deka) (2008)
- Adhyaksha Bhabananda Deka : Hridoy Jar Axomiya (edited by Arnab Jan Deka) (2012)
- Awahon-Ramdhenur Pate Pate Adhyaksha Bhabananda Deka (edited by Arnab Jan Deka) (2013)
- Sahityik Dampati Adhyaksha Bhabananda Deka Nalini Prava Deka (edited by Arnab Jan Deka) (2014)
- An Extraordinary Assamese Couple (edited by Arnab Jan Deka) (2015)
- Awahon-Ramdhenu Jugor Xahityik Adhyaksha Bhabananda Deka (edited by Arnab Jan Deka) (2016)
- Axom Ratna Adhyaksha Bhabananda Deka (edited by Prof Sushil Sarma) (2007)
- Mor Kobita by Bhabananda Deka (edited by Arnab Jan Deka) (2008)
- Last Testament of Principal Bhabananda Deka (2009)
- Bhupen Hazarika-Bhabananda Deka-Mamoni Raisom Goswami : Tini Axom Ratna Tini Batkotiya (edited by Arnab Jan Deka) (2011)
- Dharmatatva by Bhabananda Deka (edited by Arnab Jan Deka) (2012)
- 5 Centuries Assam Economics by Bhabananda Deka (edited by Arnab Jan Deka) (2013)
- Assamese Language & Literature by Principal Bhabananda Deka & others (edited by Arnab Jan Deka) (2014)

== See also ==
- List of Indian writers
- List of Indian poets
- Assamese literature
- Mahapurusha Srimanta Sankardeva
- Jyoti Prasad Agarwala
- Laxminath Bezbarua
- Krishna Kanta Handique
- Assam
- Guwahati
- Music of Assam
- List of Assamese writers with their pen names
