= Saurabh Kumar Chaliha =

Pen name of Assamese short story writer Surendra Nath Medhi (1930–2011)

- Born: 1930; Darrang District, Mangaldoi, Assam
- Died: 25 June 2011 (aged 80–81); Guwahati, Assam
- Occupations: Writer, Professor
- Writing career
- Language: Assamese
- Genre: Assamese literature
- Website: www.sauravkumarchaliha.in

Saurabh Kumar Chaliha (1930 – 25 June 2011) was the pen name of Assamese short story writer Surendra Nath Medhi. His short story collection Ghulam won the prestigious Sahitya Akademi Award in 1974. Chaliha did not go to receive the award himself and it was later sent to him by the Akademi.

== Biography ==
Chaliha was born in 1930 in the town of Mangaldoi in the Darrang District of Assam, India to Kaliram Medhi and Swarnalata Medhi. His father, Kaliram Medhi, was a prominent man of letters and had presided over the 1919 session of the Asam Sahitya Sabha. Noted Mathematician, Emeritus Professor of statistics at Gauhati University and Institute of Advanced Study in Science and Technology Jyotiprasad Medhi was his nephew as Medhi, though older to him, was the son of his elder half sister Kadambari Medhi (daughter of Kaliram Medhi) and her husband Binandi Chandra Medhi.

Chaliha started his school life in 1939 at Saint Mary's Convent School, Guwahati and later shifted to Cotton Collegiate School, from where he passed the Matriculation Examination. In 1946 Chaliha joined Cotton College for studying ISc. He was a brilliant science student and passed the exam with flying colors standing 5th in the state in 1948. Chaliha then opted for a Bachelor of Science (BSc) course in physics at Cotton College itself. However, he was attracted by Communist and Marxist ideologies during his college days, and got actively involved with the Revolutionary Communist Party of India (RCPI). This resulted in arrest and a jail term for the writer. He appeared for his BSc final examinations from jail. He completed his Masters of Science (MSc) in Physics from London University.

== Career ==
Chaliha worked in several educational institutions in Germany before returning to India in 1960 to join the Assam Engineering College as a lecturer in the Department of Physics. He retired as the head of the same department and was honoured as a lifetime associate of the college in 1990.

== Published works ==
The bulk of his stories are contained in a few anthologies –

1. Ashanta Electron (1962)
2. Duporiya (1963)
3. Ehat Daba (1972)
4. Ghulam (1974)
5. Golpo Nohoi (1988)
6. Aji Sukrobar (1992)
7. Abarudha Sahar (1994)
8. Bhal Khobor (1998)
9. Kabi (1999)
10. Ekoish Sotika Dhemali Nohoi (2004)
11. Janmadin (2005)
12. Jonbiri (2006)
13. Dron aru Goethe (2007)
14. Nabajanma (2008)
15. Marudyan (2009)

A few other recompilations are,

1. Swa-Nirbasito Xonkolon (1994)
2. Rachana Samagra (1999)
3. Soi Dasakar Golpo (2001)
4. Saurav Kumar Chaliha Rasanawali (2008)

Many of these stories first appeared in Assamese magazines and literary journals like Banhi, Ramdhenu, Awahan, Samakalin, Sadin, Dainik Asom, Asom Bani etc. and many have been translated into other languages such as, English, Bengali, Hindi, Telugu and Malayalam etc. and published in various Indian magazines and collections.

== Awards ==
Saurabh Kumar Chaliha won the Sahitya Akademi Award in 1974 for his short story collection, Golam. In the year 1995, he was also honored with the Assam Valley Literary Award. But, the reclusive Chaliha publicly accepted formal recognition only once. In one of his award acceptance speeches, he went even further and said, 'I feel like an interloper.' Writing under a pseudonym, he directly came into public limelight only once, when he publicly accepted the Assam Valley Literary Award from a corporate body in Guwahati city under full attendance of the media and the public. Except for this single instance, Chaliha remained an enigma for his countless admirers all his life.

== Death ==
Saurabh Kumar Chaliha was suffering from a respiratory ailment and was admitted to the International Hospital where he had also undergone a minor surgery. He died on 25 June 2011 in International Hospital, Guwahati, at age 81.

== See also ==
- Assamese literature
- List of people from Assam
- List of Asam Sahitya Sabha Presidents
- List of Assamese writers with their pen names
