= Jeevan Baator Logori =

- Film poster of Jeevan Baator Logori
- Directed by: Timothy Das Hanche; Lohit Dutta (Assistant)
- Written by: Timothy Das Hanche
- Produced by: Phukan Konwar; Purnananda Gogoi; Beauty Baruah
- Starring: Nipon Goswami; Raag Oinitom; Kopil Bora; Hiranya Deka; Suchandra Chandra; Moloya Goswami; Mahika Sharma
- Cinematography: Sibanan Baruah
- Edited by: Debankur Borgohain
- Music by: Biman Baruah; Arup Dutta; Timothy Das Hanche
- Distributed by: Hills Motion Pictures Association
- Release date: 2 October 2009
- Running time: 118 minutes
- Country: India
- Language: Assamese

Jeevan Baator Logori is a 2009 Indian Assamese language drama film directed by Timothy Das Hanche under the banner Hills Motion Pictures Association of Diphu. The film is set in the rural and urban areas of Assam and shot at Cinemascope on the 35mm format.

== Synopsis ==
The film shows the journey of a young man from his college days to his professional life as a businessman. Problems like unemployment and agricultural underproduction comes as subplots. Jeevan Baator Logori focuses on some significant aspects of our society like chaotic education system, young generation becoming self-reliant through agriculture or through proper acquisition of some other benevolent schemes. It carries a strong message for the young generation to preserve and uplift the traditional values while accepting modernity.

== Plot ==
Pabitra Baruah is a principal of a high school. He is living a happy and contented life with his caring wife Prafulli and a pair of studious twin children Pritom and Tarali. As a leading villager, Pabitra always stands for the moral values in running the school affairs as well as his daily life. Pritom and Tarali, as expected, top their matriculation and leave for Guwahati for higher studies. But the proud parents do not realise that their children left them forever.

In due course, Pritom completes his studies and goes to the U.S. on a company scholarshop. On returning he joins a MNC in Mumbai, marries the daughter of his boss and settles down there. Torali, too, after completion of her higher studies in the U.S., marries an American and settles there. Both of them are so busy and preoccupied with their own lives they even could not come back home at the death of their mother.

Dinanath Bora is a farmer with his teacher wife Nirmali and children Mohen and Malati. He possesses strong faith and believes in work culture and is always busy with his agricultural activities. The only thing the couple is worried about is their children's negligence towards studies. Mohen is always busy rehearsing his Bhaona and Malati with singing and dancing around with her folks. The children fail their matriculation. But the parents shows them other fruitful means to shape their lives. Mohan with a financial loan buys a tractor and gets fully involved in agricultural activities. Malati with other girls from the village forms a financial self-help group, undergoes training on fruit processing and preservation and opens up a big shop of pickle, jam, jelly and other food materials, etc. in the village. For Pabitra Barua, the neighboring people become the source of succour and an integral part for the rest of his life.

== Reception ==
The film was released through satellite using UFO Moviez technology simultaneously in 25 theatres in Assam. Its box office success came as a refreshing change for the film industry, which had not seen a commercial success for a long time. On 15 November 2009, at 3 pm, the film was screened at Xankardev Bhawan, Qutub Institutional Area, New Delhi.

== Cast ==
- Nipon Goswami
- Bishnu Kharghoria
- Arun Nath
- Moloya Goswami
- Beauty Baruah
- Hiranya Deka
- Atul Pasani
- Kopil Bora
- Parineeta Borthakur
- Suchandra Chandra
- Raag Oinitom
- Shyamanitka Sarma
- Asha Bordoloi
- Devananda Saikia
- Kishore Choudhury
- Dilip Goswami
- Rup Goswami
- Julen Bhuyan
- Dudul Baishya
- Mahika Sharma
- Narendra Chandra Sutradhar
- Dinesh Das (guest appearance)
- Ananya Pasani (guest appearance)

== See also ==
- Jollywood
