= Dwaar =

Dwaar ... the voyage out
- Theatrical release poster
- Directed by: Bidyut Chakravarty
- Screenplay by: Bidyut Chakravarty
- Based on: Bahiroloi Jowa Baat by Apurba Sarma
- Produced by: Sanjive Narain; Bidyut Chakravarty
- Starring: Kapil Bora; Zerifa Wahid; Mahika Sharma; Tanvi Sharma; Mintu Baruah; Bulganin Baruah; Srijani Bhaswa Mahanta; Asha Bordoloi
- Cinematography: Sumon Dowerah
- Edited by: Ramen Bora; Jugal Das
- Music by: Sher Choudhury
- Release date: 4 January 2013
- Country: India
- Language: Assamese
- Budget: ₹5 million (US$59,000)

Dwaar (The Voyage out) is a 2013 Indian Assamese drama film directed by Bidyut Chakravarty, with his own screenplay, and produced by Sanjive Narain and Bidyut Chakravarty himself. It was adapted from the Assamese short story Bahiroloi Jowa Baat by Apurba Sarma. Dwaar stars Kapil Bora, Zerifa Wahid and Mahika Sharma in the lead roles. The literal translation of the title means Door.

The film won the Best Director, Best Music and Best Audiography award in the Assam State Film Awards for the period 2010–2012.

== Plot ==
The story is set against the backdrop of the Assam agitation and its aftermath. Dwijen Bhattacharya (Kapil Bora), a young academic and writer, whose tryst with the social unrest and the student movement of his home state leaves an indelible scar on his personal and professional life. Attempting to write his novel of love, Dwijen ironically loses his intimacy and connection with his wife, Manosi (Zerifa Wahid). Their marital relationship goes through a rough phase. He suffers from neurotic hallucinations and severe depression, and attempts to break free from everyday life by alienating himself from his academic and personal responsibilities.

== Cast ==
- Kapil Bora as Dwijen Bhattacharya, a mentally unstable young academic and writer
- Zerifa Wahid as Manosi, Dwijen's wife
- Tanvi Sharma as Champa, housemaid of Dwijen
- Mahika Sharma
- Mintu Baruah
- Bulganin Baruah
- Srijani Bhaswa Mahanta
- Asha Bordoloi

== Production ==
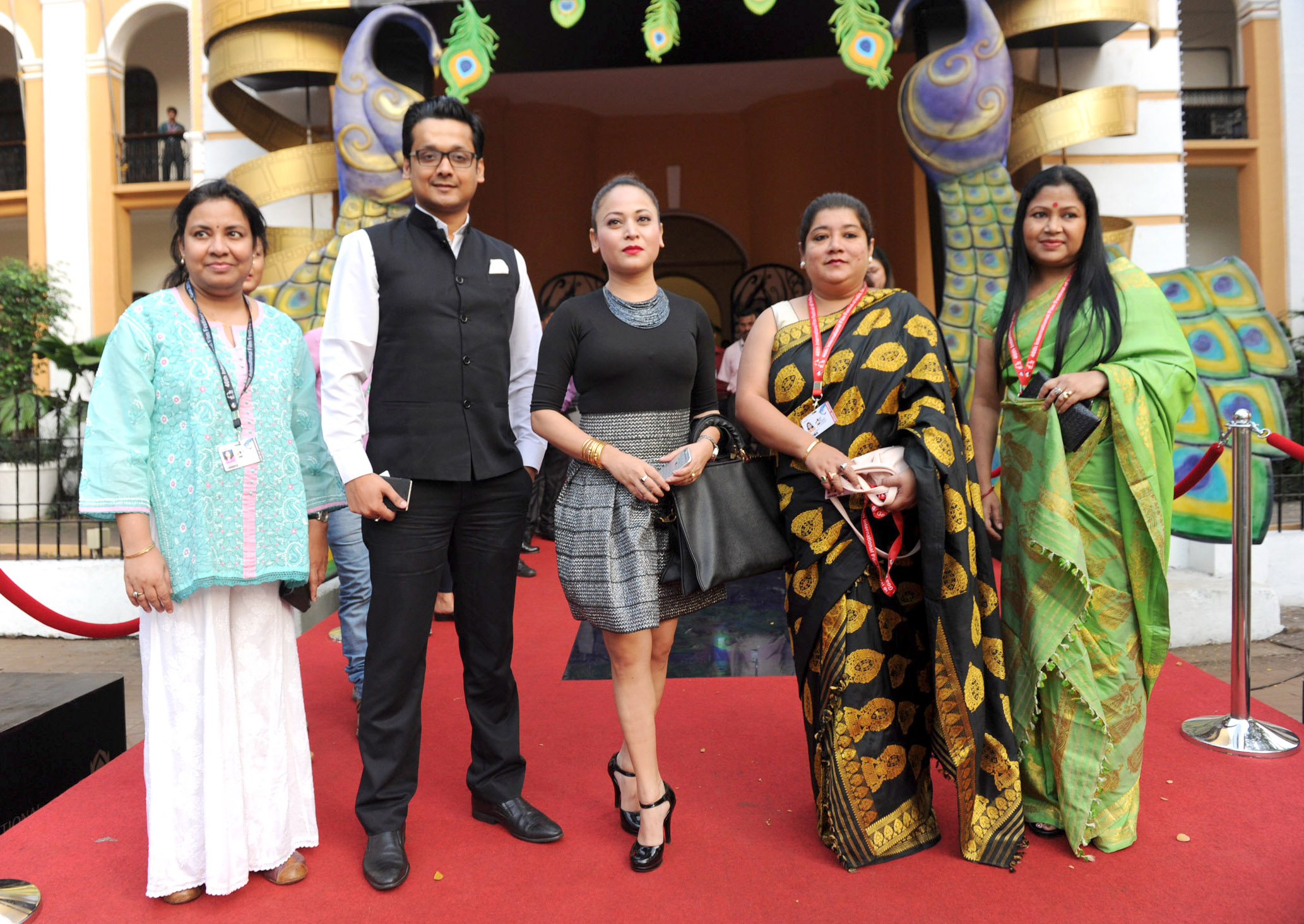
Zerifa Wahid and Kapil Bora with other cast of Dwaar at the 46th International Film Festival of India

After Anuraag (2004), Dwaar is the fifth film directed by Bidyut Chakravarty. According to him, he had been conceiving the plot after reading the short story Bahiroloi Juwa Baat by Apurba Sarma in 1988. He said, "the original story is not a conventional story, but a state of mind. It was written during the time of Foreigners' Movement. And to some extent, I have tried to reflect the mindset of the general people of that time in the movie." On the premier of the film producer Sanjive Narain said making cinema was a social responsibility for him.

The shoot of the film started from November 2010 and ended in March 2011 under the working title The Gateway. Most of the shooting took place in Guwahati and Nameri, while post-production work was done in Chennai. The film includes English subtitle.

About his character, actor Kapil Bora said, "Portraying a character like Dwijen was challenging for me as an actor. I attended many workshops to get into the skin of the character." Most of the scenes featuring Bora are either silent or with very few dialogues. He also mentioned that he had enjoyed playing the character of Dwijen, older to his age.

== Release ==
Dwaar is the first Assamese language film to release in 2013. The film was supposed to release on 2012, but due to non-availability of free screens, the release was postponed and finally released on 4 January 2013.

The premier of the film was held on 3 January 2012 at Anuradha Cineplex, Guwahati.

== Reception ==
=== Critical reception ===
The film received mostly positive reviews upon its release. Apurba Sarma, writer of the short story on which the film was based, praised the film and said, "the director has taken liberty for the film adaptation, doing it very competently and I am satisfied with it." He also praised acting of the cast. Film critic Manoj Borpujari states: "the personal relationship in our society with major political or social developments which has been portrait in the film is another positive side. Moreover, the attempt to say the things which normally we cannot say is also commanding," Actor Nipon Goswami praised the direction, photography and acting, but termed the film as a "complex one" and "may not be for all". Director Pullok Gogoi said the film is an example how a person can be affected by his past. Chandan Sarmah of Seven Sisters Post gave favourable comment about the film and suggests that "Assamese cinema certainly needs such healthy, aesthetically sound cinematic pieces." He also praised the music, cinematography, and acting of Kapil Bora and Zerifa Wahid.

=== Accolades ===
Bidyut Chakravarty won the Best Director award for this film in the Assam State Film Awards for the period 2010–2012, which was presented on 10 March 2013 at Machkhowa, Guwahati. Dwaar also won award in the Best Music and Best Audiography category.

Year	Award	Category	Nominee	Result
2010-2012	Assam State Film Awards	Best Director	Bidyut Chakravarty	Won
2010-2012	Assam State Film Awards	Best Music	Sher Chowdhury	Won
2010-2012	Assam State Film Awards	Best Audiography	Dipak Dutta & Bijay Nath	Won
2013	Prag Cine Awards	Best Director	Bidyut Chakravarty	Won
2013	Prag Cine Awards	Best Actor Male	Kapil Bora	Won
2013	Prag Cine Awards	Best Music Direction	Sher Chowdhury	Won
2013	Prag Cine Awards	Best Cinematography	Sumon Dowerah	Won
2013	Prag Cine Awards	Best Film Editing	Ramen Bora and Jugal Das	Won
2013	Prag Cine Awards	Best Sound Design	Dipak Dutta and Bijay Nath	Won
2013	Prag Cine Awards	Best Film	Dwaar	Nominated
2013	Prag Cine Awards	Best Actor Female	Zerifa Wahid	Nominated
2013	Prag Cine Awards	Best Screenplay	Bidyut Chakravarty	Nominated
2013	Prag Cine Awards	Best Makeup	Bhaskarjyoti Dutta	Nominated
2013	Filmfare Awards East	Filmfare Award for Best Film – Assamese	Dwaar	Won
2013	Filmfare Awards East	Filmfare Award for Best Actor Male – Assamese	Kapil Bora	Won
2013	Filmfare Awards East	Filmfare Award for Best Actor Female – Assamese	Zerifa Wahid	Won
2013	Filmfare Awards East	Filmfare Award for Best Director – Assamese	Bidyut Chakravarty	Nominated
