= Prag Cine Awards 2013 =

- Date: 14 April 2013
- Site: GMCH Auditorium, Guwahati, India
- Hosted by: Pranjal Saikia; Zerifa Wahid
- Organized by: Prag AM Television Pvt. Ltd.

Highlights
- Best Film: Baandhon
- Best Direction: Bidyut Chakravarty; Dwaar
- Best Actor: Kapil Bora; Dwaar
- Best Actress: Barsha Rani Bishaya; Me & My Sister

Television coverage
- Channel: Prag Channel

The Prag Cine Awards 2013 ceremony, presented by the Prag Network, honored the actors, technical achievements, and films censored in 2012 from Assam and took place on 14 April 2013, at the GMCH Auditorium in Guwahati, India. Bollywood director Kalpana Lajmi, actors Pooja Bhatt, Adil Hussain were present at the event while veteran Assamese actor Pranjal Saikia and Zerifa Wahid hosted the show.

Actor Biju Phukan was honoured with the lifetime Achievement Award for his contribution towards the Assamese film Industry. Kapil Bora and Barsha Rani Bishaya won respectively Best Actor Male and Best Actor Female awards for their performance in Dwaar and Me & My Sister. Jahnu Barua directed Baandhon won the Best Film award.

== Winners and nominees ==
The winners in 23 categories of the Prag Cine Awards 2013 were selected among the thirteen films censored from Assam in the year 2012. It includes 11 Assamese and 2 non-Assamese films (one each English and Mishing film). Dwaar begged highest number of awards including Best Director, Best Actor Male, and Best Music. The jury members for this selection were Sanjib Hazarika, Moloya Goswami, JP Das, Munin Bayan, and Sibanan Barua.

=== Awards ===
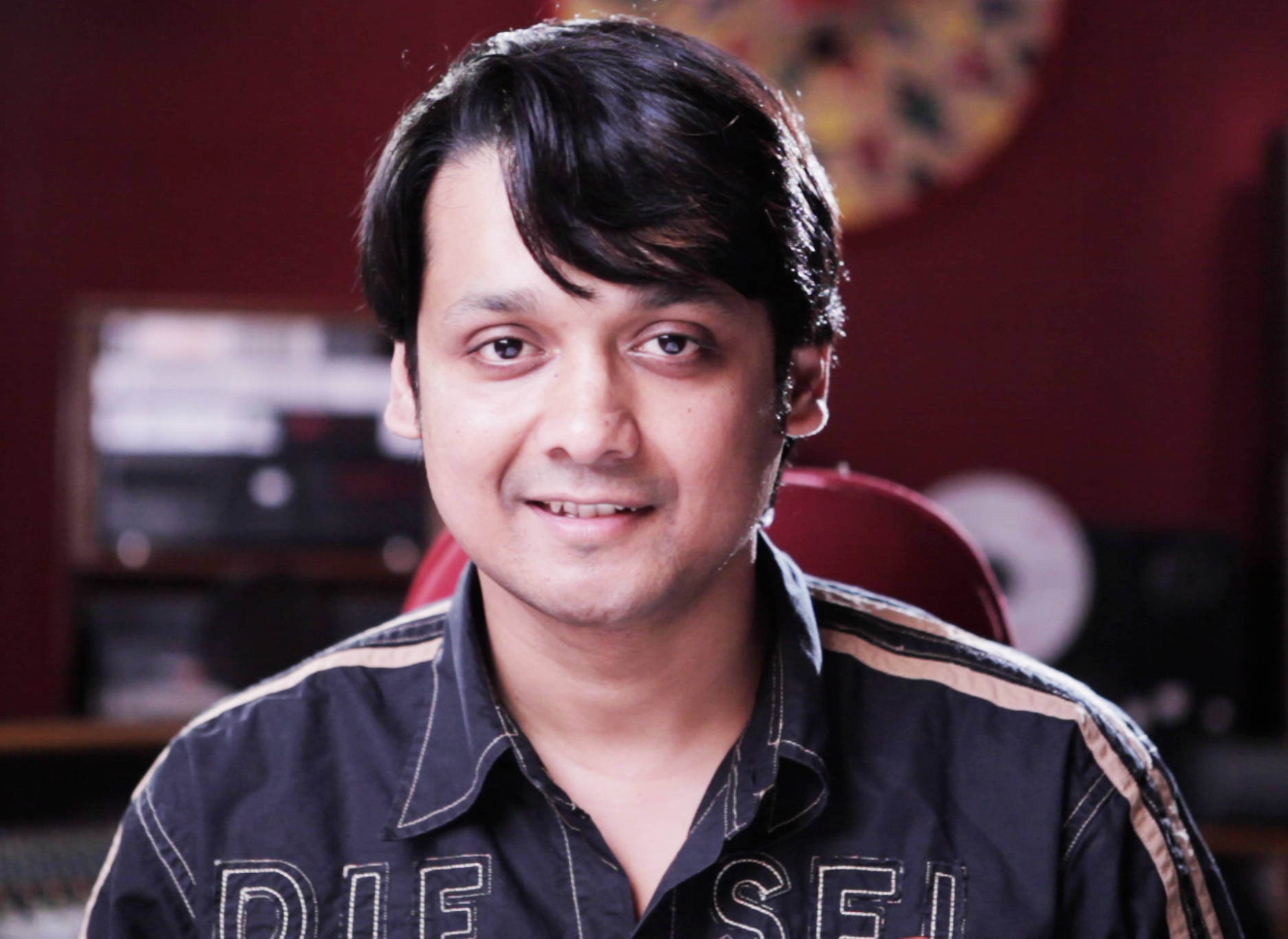
Kapil Bora, Best Actor Male winner

Winners are listed first and highlighted in boldface.

Best Film	Best Director
**Baandhon**; Dwaar; Me & My Sister	**Bidyut Chakravarty – Dwaar**; Jahnu Barua – Baandhon; Rajesh Bhuyan – Me & My Sister
Best Actor Male	Best Actor Female
**Kapil Bora – Dwaar**; Bishnu Kharghoria – Baandhon; Diganta Hazarika – Rishang	**Barsha Rani Bishaya – Me & My Sister**; Zerifa Wahid – Dwaar; Nishita Goswami – Rishang
Best Supporting Actor Male	Best Supporting Actor Female
**Lakhi Borthakur – Borolar Ghor**; Sasanka Samir – Aakash Suboloi Mon; Rajib Lal Baruah – Rishang	**Purnima Pathak Saikia – Borolar Ghor**; Barnali Pujari – Tula aru Teja; Tanushree Baruah – Aakash Suboloi Mon
Best Music Direction	Best Lyrics
**Sher Chowdhury – Dwaar**; Arupjyoti Patowary – Me & My Sister	**Diganta Bharati – Me & My Sister**
Best Playback Singer Male	Best Playback Singer Female
**Rajjyoti Konwar – Rishang** and **Aakash Suboloi Mon**; Angaraag Mahanta – Rowd; Zubeen Garg – Me & My Sister	**Rupjyoti Devi – Rowd**; Queen Hazarika – Aakash Suboloi Mon
Best Cinematography	Best Film Editing
**Sumon Dowerah – Dwaar** and **Baandhon**; Arup Manna – Adhyay	**Ramen Bora** and **Jugal Das – Dwaar**; Cheragh Todiwala – Baandhon
Best Screenplay	Best Choreography
**Jahnu Barua – Baandhon**; Bidyut Chakravarty – Dwaar	**Deepak Dey – Rishang**; Bappa Ahmed – Aakash Suboloi Mon
Best Sound Design	Best Art Direction
**Dipak Dutta** and **Bijay Nath – Dwaar**; Jatin Sharma and Debojit Khaund – Rishang	**Phatik Barua – Baandhon**; Golak Saha – Rishang
Best Makeup	Best Costume Design
**Asitabh Baruah – Baandhon**; Bhaskarjyoti Dutta – Dwaar	**Lukumoni Gogoi – Borolar Ghor**; Geetarani Goswami and Harmohan Das – Baandhon
Best Popular Film	Best Film other than Assamese
**Rishang**	**The Essence of Life – English**

== Lifetime achievement award ==
Veteran actor Biju Phukan was honoured with the lifetime Achievement Award for his contribution towards the Assamese film Industry. This award consists of a cash prize of ₹50,000 along with a trophy and a citation.

== Other awards ==
- Best Critic: Arun Lochan Das
- Jury's Special Mention:
  - Adhyay
  - Manash Hazarika – Aakash Suboloi Mon

== See also ==
- List of Assamese films of the 2010s
