= Prag Cine Awards North-East 2016 =

- Date: 14 May 2016– 15 May 2016
- Site: Church field, Tezpur, India
- Hosted by: Barsha Rani Bishaya; Kopil Bora; Nishita Goswami
- Organized by: Prag AM Television Pvt. Ltd.

Highlights
- Best Film: Antareen
- Best Direction: Reema Borah; Bokul
- Best Actor: Pranjal Saikia; Lokabandhoo
- Best Actress: Urmila Mahanta; Antareen
- Most nominations: Antareeen (10); Kothanodi (10)

Television coverage
- Channel: Prag News

The Prag Cine Awards North-East 2016 ceremony, presented by the Prag Network, honoured the actors, technical achievements, and films censored in 2015 from Assam and rest of Northeast India, took place on 14–15 May 2016 at the Church field in Tezpur, Assam. Film fraternities from Northeast as well as Bollywood personalities such as Suniel Shetty, Meiyang Chang were present in this event.

Actress Bidya Rao was honored with the lifetime Achievement Award for her contribution towards the Assamese film Industry, while model and actress Dipannita Sharma and sound engineer Amrit Pritam Dutta were presented with "Golden Icon" award. Pranjal Saikia received best actor award for Lokabandhoo and the best actress award has gone to Urmila Mahanta for Antareen. Manjul Baruah directed Antareen won the best film award, while Onaatah, Khasi language film from Meghalaya, won the best film north-east award.

== Winners and nominees ==
In this edition of Prag Cine Awards, awards were given in 19 different categories to the Assamese films produced from Assam which were censored in the year of 2015. Kothanodi and Antareen topped the nomination list with ten nominations each.

=== Awards for films from Assam ===
Winners are listed first and highlighted in boldface.

Best Film	Best Popular Film
**Antareen**; Bokul; Kothanodi	**Khel - The Game**
**Antareen**; Bokul; Kothanodi	Best Film other than Assamese
**Antareen**; Bokul; Kothanodi	**Dau Huduni Methai** – Bodo
Best Director	Best Debut Director
**Reema Borah – Bokul**; Bhaskar Hazarika – Kothanodi; Ratan Sil Sarma – Marksheet	**Ratan Sil Sarma – Marksheet**; Bhaskar Hazarika – Kothanodi; Manjul Baruah – Antareen
Best Actor Male	Best Actor Female
**Pranjal Saikia – Lokabandhoo**; Ashok Singh – Cactus; Boloram Das – Antareen; Lakhi Borthakur – Jajabor	**Urmila Mahanta – Antareen**; Barsha Rani Bishaya – Khel - The Game; Mitali Dey – Saat Nomboror Sandhanat; Prastuti Parashar – Mriganabhi
Best Supporting Actor Male	Best Supporting Actor Female
**Kulada Kumar Bhattacharya – Cactus**; Arun Nath – Antareen; Kopil Bora – Kothanodi	**Kasvi Sarma – Kothanodi**; Aparna Dutta Choudhury – Antareen; Simi Ryan – Cactus
Best Music Direction	Best Lyrics
**Tarali Sarma – Mriganabhi**; Amar Nath Hazarika – Kothanodi; Anil Saikia – Saat Nomboror Sandhanat	**Tarali Sarma – Antareen**; Ibson Lal Baruah – Marksheet - Pagol Uxaah; Keshaba Nanda Goswami – Nodi Mathu Boi
Best Playback Singer Male	Best Playback Singer Female
**Mrinal Baishnab – Marksheet - Loralir Dhemali**; Jitul Sonowal – Love in Bangkok; Saurav Mahanta – Nodi Mathu Boi	**Madhusmita Borthakur – Khel - The Game**; Geeta Shree – Sat Nomboror Xondhanot; Tarali Sarma – Antareen
Best Cinematography	Best Film Editing
**Suman Dowerah – Antareen**; Arup Manna – Cactus; Suraj Kumar Duwara – Mriganabhi	**Rantu Chetia and Jasir Imtiaz – Bokul**; Hiranya Kalita – Cactus; Ratan Sil Sarma – Marksheet
Best Screenplay	Best Choreography
**Bhaskar Hazarika – Kothanodi**; Arup Manna – Cactus; Himjyoti Talukdar – Marksheet	**Uday Shankar – Khel - The Game**; Pankaj Ingti – Saat Nomboror Sandhanat; Upashana Mahanta – Nodi Mathu Boi
Best Sound Recordist	Best Art Direction
**Bibek Basumatary – Bokul**; Jatin Sharma – Kothanodi; Jatin Sharma and Diganta Bordoloi –	**Gulok Saha – Kothanodi**; Rama Ray and Anup Hazarika – Antareen; Sandeep Patil and Reema Bora – Bokul
Best Makeup	Best Costume
**Sanku Baruah and Bishwajit Das – Lokabandhoo**; Akash Gogoi and Subhash Shrestha – Khel - The Game; Babul Das and Bishwajit Kalita – Mriganabhi	**Rani Dutta Baruah – Kothanodi**; Prashanta Ghose and Adityam – Khel - The Game; Sehnaz Sultan – Saat Nomboror Sandhanat

=== Awards for films from rest of northeast India ===
Winners are listed first and highlighted in boldface.

Best Film North-East	Best Director North-East
**Onaatah** (Meghalaya, Khasi)	**Pradip Kurbah – Onaatah** (Meghalaya, Khasi)
Best Actor North-East Male	Best Actor North-East Female
**Nokshaa Saham – The Head Hunter** (Arunachal Pradesh, Wancho)	**Sweety Pala – Onaatah** (Meghalaya, Khasi) and; **L. Tonthoingambi – Patkee Tharo** (Manipur, Meiteilon)

== Honorary awards ==
Lifetime Achievement Award

Veteran actress Bidya Rao will be honoured with the lifetime Achievement Award for her contribution towards the Assamese film Industry.

Golden Icon Awards

Model and actress Dipannita Sharma, and sound engineer Amrit Pritam Dutta were honoured with Golden Icon Awards.

== Other awards ==
- Jury's Special Mention: Aditya Malla Buzarbaruah and Abhijit Chowdhury – Marksheet
- Jury's Special Mention: Nilanjan Datta – The Head Hunter
- Best Critic (Writing on Cinema): Manoj Barpujari

== See also ==
- List of Assamese films of the 2010s
