= Ojaswwee Sharma =

Indian filmmaker

- Born: India
- Occupations: Film director, writer, producer
- Years active: 2017–present

Ojaswwee Sharma is an Indian filmmaker based in Chandigarh. He is best known for Admitted, Rabb Di Awaaz, Zubaan, Chaurassi and The Last Date. His work includes short films, documentaries, feature films and other screen productions. His film Admitted received the Special Jury Award at the 68th National Film Awards.

== Early life ==
Sharma was born and raised in New Delhi and lived there until the age of 14, before moving to Panchkula with his family. His parents are Sunil Sharma and Sangeeta Sharma.

Sharma developed an early interest in technology, including computers, CDs, floppy disks, Walkman and Discman players, and laptops. His interest later extended to photography and visual media, eventually leading to filmmaking.

== Career ==
Sharma's work has primarily included short films, documentaries and feature films dealing with social issues and contemporary subjects, including gender, inclusion, disability and civic participation.

He began his filmmaking career with short films and digital productions. His early work included JSLive, JSLive 2, Loneliness, Zubaan, The Last Date and The Dichotomy of Hope.

His subsequent work included Badalti Soch, Rooh, Lucky Kabootar, Butter Toast and Chaurassi. He also directed Scars – That Remain After 100 Years of Jallianwala Bagh Massacre, which dealt with the historical memory of the Jallianwala Bagh massacre.

In 2019, Sharma directed Ungli, a short film associated with voter participation during the Lok Sabha elections.

In 2020, Sharma directed Admitted, a film centred on Dhananjay Chauhan, the first transgender student of Panjab University. The film deals with transgender identity, education and social inclusion. It received the Special Jury Award in the non-feature film category at the 68th National Film Awards and the Silver Conch for Best Documentary Film in the above-60-minutes category at the 17th Mumbai International Film Festival.

Sharma subsequently worked on documentary and short-film projects including Silver Lining – The Journey of Rashpal Singh, Kites Beyond Boundaries, Art Finds Its Way, Sarbat Da Bhala and One Beat.

He directed Rabb Di Awaaz (2023), a Hindi feature film described as India's first multi-inclusive feature film. The film received censor certification in standard, audio-described and sign-language formats.

In 2024, Sharma directed Above the Limits, a film concerning accessibility and independent mobility for wheelchair users.

== Filmography ==
| Year | Title | Category | Director | Screenwriter | Producer |
|---|---|---|---|---|---|
| 2024 | Above the Limits: The Buddy Mobility Care Film | Short film | Yes | | |
| 2023 | Rabb Di Awaaz | Feature film | Yes | Yes | |
| 2023 | Badlaav | Documentary | Yes | | |
| 2023 | Sarbat Da Bhala (Hoshiarpur Langar Sewa) | Documentary | Yes | | |
| 2022 | Chaurassi | Short film | Yes | Yes | |
| 2022 | Silver Lining – The Journey of Rashpal Singh | Documentary | Yes | | |
| 2022 | Kites Beyond Boundaries | Short film / documentary | Yes | | |
| 2022 | Phoori | Short film / audio project | Yes | Yes | |
| 2022 | Umang | Short film | | | |
| 2022 | Powering the Gurdwaras of Punjab with Solar Energy | Documentary | | | |
| 2021 | Art Finds Its Way | Documentary short | Yes | | |
| 2021 | Sikhs Serving Humanity | Documentary | Yes | | |
| 2021 | Soul of Sikhism – Aman Singh Gulati | Documentary | Yes | | |
| 2021 | One Beat | Short film | Yes | | |
| 2021 | RFE Unplugged | Podcast / talk show | Yes | Yes | Yes |
| 2020 | Admitted | Documentary feature | Yes | | |
| 2020 | Chat Pataaka | Television series | | | |
| 2020 | Dil Ki Dastak | Television series | | | |
| 2022 | Peaceful Mind | Documentary | | | |
| 2022 | The Stone That Hit Maharaja Ranjit Singh | Short film | | | |
| 2019 | Scars – That Remain After 100 Years of Jallianwala Bagh Massacre | Documentary | Yes | Yes | |
| 2019 | Samarpan – An Offering | Documentary | Yes | Yes | |
| 2019 | Butter Toast | Short film | Yes | Yes | |
| 2018 | Badalti Soch | Short film / music video | Yes | Yes | Yes |
| 2018 | Rooh | Short film | Yes | Yes | |
| 2018 | The Tide of Time | Short film | Yes | Yes | |
| 2017 | JSLive | Short film | Yes | | |
| 2017 | JSLive 2 | Short film | Yes | | |
| 2017 | Loneliness | Short film | Yes | | |
| 2017 | The Last Date | Short film | Yes | Yes | |
| 2017 | Zubaan | Short film | Yes | Yes | |
| 2017 | The Dichotomy of Hope | Short film | Yes | | |
