= 68th National Film Awards =

Indian ceremony celebrating cinema of 2020

- Awarded for: Best of Indian cinema in 2020
- Awarded by: Directorate of Film Festivals
- Presented by: Directorate of Film Festivals
- Announced on: 22 July 2022
- Presented on: 30 September 2022
- Official website: dff.nic.in

Highlights
- Best Feature Film: Soorarai Pottru
- Best Non-Feature Film: Testimony of Ana
- Best Book: The Longest Kiss
- Dadasaheb Phalke Award: Asha Parekh
- Most awards: Soorarai Pottru (8)

The 68th National Film Awards ceremony was an event during which the Directorate of Film Festivals presented its annual National Film Awards to honour the best films of 2020 in Indian cinema.

== Selection process ==
The Directorate of Film Festivals invited online entries and the acceptable last date for entries was until 12 March 2021. Feature and Non-Feature Films certified by Central Board of Film Certification between 1 January 2020, and 31 December 2020, were eligible for the film award categories. Books, critical studies, reviews or articles on cinema published in Indian newspapers, magazines, and journals between 1 January 2020, and 31 December 2020, were eligible for the best writing on cinema section. Entries of dubbed, revised or copied versions of a film or translation, abridgements, edited or annotated works and reprints were ineligible for the awards.

For the feature and non-feature Films sections, films in any Indian language, shot on 16 mm, 35 mm, a wider film gauge or a digital format, and released in cinemas, on video or digital formats for home viewing were eligible. Films were required to be certified as a feature film, a featurette or a Documentary/Newsreel/Non-Fiction by the Central Board of Film Certification.

== Best Film Friendly State ==
The awards aim at encouraging study and appreciation of cinema as an art form and dissemination of information and critical appreciation of this art-form through a State Government Policy.

Jury

• Vipul Shah (Chairperson)
| • Dharam Gulati | • Sreelekha Mukherjee |
| • GS Bhaskar | • S Thangadurai |
| • Sanjeev Rattan | • A Karthikraaja |
| • VN Aditya | • Viji Thampi |
| • Thangadurai | • Nishigandha |

| Award | Name of State | Citation |
|---|---|---|
| Best Film Friendly State | State of Madhya Pradesh | |

== Dadasaheb Phalke Award ==
The Dadasaheb Phalke Award is India's highest award in the field of cinema. It is presented annually at the National Film Awards ceremony by the Directorate of Film Festivals, an organisation set up by the Ministry of Information and Broadcasting. The recipient is honoured for their "outstanding contribution to the growth and development of Indian cinema". The 2020 recipient is Asha Parekh.

Following were the jury members:

- Asha Bhosle
- Hema Malini
- Poonam Dhillon
- Udit Narayan
- T. S. Nagabharana

| Award | Image | Awardee(s) | Awarded As | Cash prize |
|---|---|---|---|---|
| Dadasaheb Phalke Award | | Asha Parekh | Actress | ₹1,000,000 (US$11,000) |

== Feature films ==
=== Jury ===
| Jury Panel | Central | North | South-1 | South-2 | East | West |
|---|---|---|---|---|---|---|
| Chairperson | | | | | | |
| Members | | | | | | Abhishek Shah |

=== Golden Lotus Awards ===
Official Name: Swarna Kamal

All the awardees are awarded with 'Golden Lotus Award (Swarna Kamal)', a certificate and cash prize.

| Award | Film | Language | Awardee(s) | Cash prize |
|---|---|---|---|---|
| Best Feature Film | Soorarai Pottru | Tamil | Producer: 2D Entertainment Pvt.Ltd: Suriya; Jyothika; Guneet Monga; Director: Sudha Kongara | ₹250,000 each |
| Best Direction | Ayyappanum Koshiyum | Malayalam | Sachidanandan KR | ₹250,000 |
| Best Popular Film Providing Wholesome Entertainment | Tanhaji: The Unsung Warrior | Hindi | Producer: Ajay Devgn FFilms: Ajay Devgn; Bhushan Kumar; Krishan Kumar; Director: Om Raut | ₹200,000 each |
| Best Children's Film | Sumi | Marathi | Producer : Harshall Kamat Entertainment Director: Amol Vasant Gole Writer: Sanjeev K Jha | ₹150,000 each |
| Best Debut Film of a Director | Mandela | Tamil | Madonne Ashwin Producer: YNOT Studios | ₹125,000 |

=== Silver Lotus Award ===
Official Name: Rajat Kamal

All the awardees are awarded with 'Silver Lotus Award (Rajat Kamal)', a certificate and cash prize.

| Award | Film | Language | Awardee(s) | Cash prize |
|---|---|---|---|---|
| Best Film on Environment Conservation/Preservation | Taledanda | Kannada | Producer: Krupanidhi Kreations: Hema Malini Krupakar; Arun Kumar R; Director: Praveen Krupakar | ₹150,000 each |
| Best Film on Other Social Issues | Funral | Marathi | Producer: Before After Entertainment Director: Vivek Dubey | ₹150,000 each |
| Best Actor | Soorarai Pottru | Tamil | Suriya | ₹50,000 each |
| Best Actor | Tanhaji: The Unsung Warrior | Hindi | Ajay Devgn | ₹50,000 each |
| Best Actress | Soorarai Pottru | Tamil | Aparna Balamurali | ₹50,000 |
| Best Supporting Actor | Ayyappanum Koshiyum | Malayalam | Biju Menon | ₹50,000 |
| Best Supporting Actress | Sivaranjiniyum Innum Sila Pengalum | Tamil | Lakshmi Priyaa Chandramouli | ₹50,000 |
| Best Child Artist | Tak-Tak | Marathi | Anish Mangesh Gosavi | ₹50,000 each |
| Best Child Artist | Sumi | Marathi | Akanksha Pingle | ₹50,000 each |
| Best Child Artist | Sumi | Marathi | Divyesh Indulkar | ₹50,000 each |
| Best Male Playback Singer | Me Vasantrao | Marathi | Rahul Deshpande | ₹50,000 |
| Best Female Playback Singer | Ayyappanum Koshiyum | Malayalam | Nanjiyamma | ₹50,000 |
| Best Cinematography | Avijatrik | Bengali | Supratim Bhol | ₹50,000 |
| Best Screenplay • Screenplay Writer (Original) | Soorarai Pottru | Tamil | • Sudha Kongara • Shalini Usha Nair | ₹50,000 |
| Best Screenplay • Dialogues | Mandela | Tamil | Madonne Ashwin | ₹50,000 |
| Best Audiography • Location Sound Recordist | Dollu | Kannada | Jobin Jayan | ₹50,000 |
| Best Audiography • Sound Designer | Me Vasantrao | Marathi | Anmol Bhave | ₹50,000 |
| Best Audiography • Re-recordist of the Final Mixed Track | Malik | Malayalam | Vishnu Govind | ₹50,000 |
| Best Music Direction • Songs | Ala Vaikunthapurramuloo | Telugu | S. Thaman | ₹50,000 |
| Best Music Direction • Background Score | Soorarai Pottru | Tamil | G. V. Prakash Kumar | ₹50,000 |
| Best Lyrics | Saina | Hindi | Manoj Muntashir | ₹50,000 |
| Best Editing | Sivaranjiniyum Innum Sila Pengalum | Tamil | A. Sreekar Prasad | ₹50,000 |
| Best Production Design | Kappela | Malayalam | Anees Nadodi | ₹50,000 |
| Best Make-up Artist | Natyam | Telugu | TV Rambabu | ₹50,000 |
| Best Choreography | Natyam | Telugu | Sandhya Raju | ₹50,000 |
| Best Costume Design | Tanhaji: The Unsung Warrior | Hindi | Nachiket Barve; Mahesh Sherla | ₹50,000 |
| Best Stunt Choreographer | Ayyappanum Koshiyum | Malayalam | • Rajasekhar • Mafia Sasi • Supreme Sundat | ₹50,000 |
| Special Mention | Semkhor | Dimasa | Aimee Baruah | Certificate Only |
| Special Mention | Vaanku | Malayalam | Kavya Prakash | Certificate Only |
| Special Mention | June | Marathi | Siddharth Menon | Certificate Only |
| Special Mention | Godakaath | Marathi | Kishor Kadam | Certificate Only |
| Special Mention | Avwanchhit | Marathi | Kishor Kadam | Certificate Only |
| Special Mention | Toolsidas Junior | Hindi | Varun Buddhadev | Certificate Only |

=== Regional awards ===
National Film Awards are also given to the best films in the regional languages of India. Awards for the regional languages are categorised as per their mention in the Eighth schedule of the Constitution of India. Awardees included producers and directors of the film. No films in languages other than those specified in the Schedule VIII of the Constitution were eligible.

| Award | Film | Awardee(s) | | Cash prize |
| Award | Film | Producer | Director | Cash prize |
|---|---|---|---|---|
| Best Feature Film in Assamese | Bridge | Sabita Devi | Kripal Kalita | ₹1,00,000 each |
| Best Feature Film in Bengali | Avijatrik | GMB Films Pvt.ltd | Subhrajit Mitra | ₹1,00,000 each |
| Best Feature Film in Hindi | Toolsidas Junior | Ashutosh Gowariker Productions Pvt.Ltd | Mridul Toolsidass | ₹1,00,000 each |
| Best Feature Film in Kannada | Dollu | Wadeeyar Movies | Sagar Puranik | ₹1,00,000 each |
| Best Feature Film in Malayalam | Thinkalazhcha Nishchayam | Pushkar Films | Senna Hegde | ₹1,00,000 each |
| Best Feature Film in Marathi | Goshta Eka Paithanichi | Planet Marathi | Shantanu Ganesh Rode | ₹1,00,000 each |
| Best Feature Film in Tamil | Sivaranjiniyum Innum Sila Pengalum | Hamsa Pictures | Vasanth S Sai | ₹1,00,000 each |
| Best Feature Film in Telugu | Colour Photo | Amrutha Productions | Sandeep Raj | ₹1,00,000 each |

Best Feature Film in Each of the Language Other Than Those Specified In the Schedule VIII of the Constitution

| Award | Film | Awardee(s) | | Cash prize |
| Award | Film | Producer | Director | Cash prize |
|---|---|---|---|---|
| Best Feature Film in Haryanvi | Dada Lakhmi | Anhad Studio Pvt.Ltd | Yashpal Sharma | ₹1,00,000 each |
| Best Feature Film in Tulu | Jeetige | A R Productions | Santhosh Mada | ₹1,00,000 each |
| Best Feature Film in Dimasa | Semkhor | Aimee Baruah Production Society | Aimee Baruah | ₹1,00,000 each |

== Non-Feature Films ==
Short Films made in any Indian language and certified by the Central Board of Film Certification as a documentary/newsreel/fiction are eligible for non-feature film section.

=== Golden Lotus Award ===
Official Name: Swarna Kamal

All the awardees are awarded with 'Golden Lotus Award (Swarna Kamal)', a certificate and cash prize.

| Award | Film | Language | Awardee(s) | Cash prize |
|---|---|---|---|---|
| Best Non-Feature Film | Testimony of Ana | Dangi | Producer & Director: Sachin Dheeraj Mudigonda | ₹1,50,000 each |
| Best Director of Non-Feature Film | Oh That’s Bhanu | English, Tamil, Malayalam, Hindi | R V Ramani | ₹1,50,000 |

=== Silver Lotus Award ===
Official Name: Rajat Kamal

All the Awardees are awarded with 'Silver Lotus Award (Rajat Kamal)' and cash prize.

| Award | Film | Language | Awardee(s) | Cash prize |
|---|---|---|---|---|
| Best Debut Non-Feature Film of A Director | Pariah | Marathi, Hindi | Producer : MIT School of Film & Television-Pune; Director: Vishesh Iyer | ₹ 75,000/- each |
| Best Biographical Film | Pabung Syam | Manipuri | Producer: Films Division; Director: Haobam Paban Kumar | ₹ 50,000/- each |
| Best Arts / Cultural Film | Naadada Navaneeta Dr PT Venkateshkumar | Kannada | Producer: Dept. of Information and Public Relations, Govt. of Karnataka; Director: Girish Kasaravalli | ₹ 50,000/- each |
| Best Environment Film | Manah Aru Manuh (Manas and People) | Assamese | Producer: Directorate, Manas National Park and Aaranyak; Director: Dip Bhuyan | ₹ 50,000/- each |
| Best Promotional Film | Surmounting Challenges | English | Producer: Delhi Metro Rail Corporation Ltd. Director: Satish Pande | ₹ 50,000/- each |
| Best Film on Social Issues | Three Sisters | Bengali | Producer:Ratnaboli Ray; Director:Putul Rafey Mahmood | ₹150,000 each |
| Best Film on Social Issues | Justice Delayed, But Delivered | Hindi | Producer:Mandeep Chauhan; Director:Kamakhya Narayan Singh | ₹150,000 each |
| Best Educational Film | Dreaming of Words | Malayalam, Tamil | Producer: Nandan; Director: Nandan | ₹ 50,000/- each |
| Best Ethnographic Film | Mandal ke Bol (Rhythm of Mandal) | Hindi | Producer: Madhya Pradesh Tribal Museum-Bhopal; Director: Rajendra Janglay | ₹ 50,000/- each |
| Best Exploration Film | Wheeling the Ball | English, Hindi | Producer: Film Division; Director: Mukesh Sharma | ₹ 50,000/- each |
| Best Investigative Film | The Saviour:Brig. Pritam Singh | Punjabi | Producer: Akal Productions; Director: Dr. Paramjeet Singh Kattu | ₹ 50,000/- each |
| Best Animation Film | | | | |
| Best Short Fiction Film | Kachichinithu (The Boy with a Gun) | Karbi | Producer & Director: Khanjan Kishore Nath | ₹ 50,000/- each |
| Best Film on Family Values | Kumkumarchan (Worship of the Goddess) | Marathi | Producer: Studio Filmy Monks; Director: Abhijeet Arvind Dalvi | ₹ 50,000/- each |
| Best Cinematography | Shabdikkunna Kalappa (Talking Plow) | Malayalam | Nikhil S Praveen | ₹ 50,000/- each |
| Best Audiography | Pearl of the Desert | Rajasthani | Re-recordist (final mixed track): Ajit Singh Rathore | ₹ 50,000/- |
| Best On-Location Sound Recordist | Jadui Jangal (Magical Forest) | Hindi | Sandip Bhati & Pradeep Lekhwar | ₹ 50,000/- |
| Best Editing | Borderlands | Bengali, Nepali, Manipuri, Hindi, Punjabi | Anadi Athaley | ₹ 50,000/- |
| Best Music Direction | 1232 KMS | Hindi | Vishal Bhardwaj | ₹ 50,000/- |
| Best Narration / Voice Over | Rhapsody of Rains- Monsoons of Kerala | English | Shobha Tharoor Sreenivasan | ₹ 50,000/- |
| Special Jury Award | Admitted | Hindi, English | Ojaswee Sharma (Director) | ₹ 1,00,000/- |

== Best Writing on Cinema ==
The awards aim at encouraging study and appreciation of cinema as an art form and dissemination of information and critical appreciation of this art-form through publication of books, articles, reviews etc.

=== Jury ===
A committee of three, headed by Utpal Borpujari was appointed to evaluate the nominations for the best writing on Indian cinema. The jury members were as follows:

• Saibal Chatterjee (Chairman)
| • Raghavendra Patil | • Rajeev Masand |

=== Golden Lotus Award ===
Official Name: Swarna Kamal

All the awardees are awarded with the Golden Lotus Award (Swarna Kamal) accompanied with a cash prize.

| Award | Book | Language | Awardee(s) | Cash prize |
|---|---|---|---|---|
| Best Book on Cinema | The Longest Kiss: The Life and Times of Devika Rani | English | Kishwar Desai; Publisher: Westland Publications | ₹ 75,000/- each |

=== Special Mention ===
All the awardees are awarded with a certificate.

| Award | Book | Language | Awardee(s) | Cash prize |
|---|---|---|---|---|
| Best Book on Cinema | M T Anunahvangalude Pusthakam | Malayalam | Anoop Ramakrishnan; Publisher: Malayala Manorama | Certificate Only |
| Best Book on Cinema | Kali Paine Kalira Cinema | Odia | Surya Deo; Publisher: Pakshighar Prakashani | Certificate Only |
