= Semkhor =

Indian National Award winning Dimasa language film

- Directed by: Aimee Baruah
- Written by: Sasanka Samir
- Screenplay by: Jintumoni Kalita, Sasanka Samir, Uday Bhaskar Patar, Aimee Baruah
- Produced by: Aimee Baruah, Mala Baruah
- Starring: Aimee Baruah
- Cinematography: Pradip Daimary
- Edited by: Rantu Chetia
- Music by: Amrit Pritam
- Production company: Aimee Baruah Production Society
- Distributed by: Rajat Goswami
- Release date: 2021
- Running time: 93 min
- Language: Dimasa

Semkhor is a 2021 Indian Dimasa-language film directed by Aimee Baruah. This was the first-ever film in the Dimasa language screened as the opening feature film of the Indian Panorama in 2021. The film depicts the life of a village lady, a mother of 14 children.

== Synopsis ==
A Samsa man named Diro participates in the hangseu bisu in a nearby hamlet, which results in his confinement and eventual death. As a result, Diro's wife is left in charge of raising his three kids alone. She has a variety of events while working as an assistant midwife that she loathes. If a woman dies while she is pregnant, Semkhor tradition dictates that the newborn be buried with the mother alive. At the age of just 11, Diro's widow married Dinar to her one and only daughter, Muri. Sadly, Muri passes away right after giving birth to a girl. How Diro's wife gives Muri's child fresh life in a culture where women aren't even allowed to make decisions is like a sign of a new dawn in Semkhor.

== Cast ==
- Prateek Hagjer
- Aimee Baruah

== Awards ==
Year	Award	Category	Result
2022	68th National Film Awards	Special Jury Mention	Won
2022	68th National Film Awards	Best Feature Film in Dimasa	Won
2022	20th Dhaka International Film Festival Award	Special Audience Award	Won
2021	Kautik International Film Festival	Best Feature Film	Won
2021	Toronto International Women Film Festival	Best Actress	Won

== Reception ==
- The heroine and her various misfortunes serve as the vehicle via which Aimee Baruah deftly explores a wide range of social and cultural concerns and evils. The visual depiction of the town where the story takes place away from the bustle of city life.

== Controversy ==
- Some Dimasa organizations have alleged that the film may have presented a distorted account of their rituals, traditions, and way of life, as reported by media sources.
- The film's director, Aimee Baruah, was reported to be the subject of an FIR alleging misrepresentation of Dimasa culture.
- Some reports also mentioned claims by certain organizations regarding an incident involving an infant during the filming; however, no official conclusion has been established.
