= Jeetige =

Indian Tulu language film

Koragajja
- Directed by: Santhosh Mada
- Produced by: A R Productions
- Release date: 2022
- Country: India
- Language: Tulu

Jeetige is an Indian Tulu language film directed by Santhosh Mada and produced by A R Productions. This film won 68th National Film Awards in Best Feature Film in Tulu category. The film also won the Karnataka State Film Award for Best Regional Film for the year 2020.
