= Jetuka Pator Dore =

Jetuka Pator Dare
- Theatrical release poster
- Directed by: Jadumoni Dutta
- Screenplay by: Munin Barua
- Story by: Syed Abdul Malik
- Produced by: Noorul Sultan
- Starring: Aimee Baruah; Raag Oinitom; Bishnu Kharghoria; Arun Hazarika; Kopil Bora; Biki; Jayanta Bhagabati
- Cinematography: Siddhartha Barua
- Edited by: Rupam Kalita
- Music by: Palash Gogoi
- Production company: Maina Industrial Co-Operative Society Ltd.
- Distributed by: Sangam Pictures, Guwahati
- Release dates: 23 April 2011 (GIFF); 19 August 2011 (Assam)
- Running time: 90 minutes
- Country: India
- Language: Assamese

Jetuka Pator Dore (English: Enchanting, Challenging… The Life ) is a 2011 Indian Assamese drama film based on the novel of the same name by Syed Abdul Malik. The film stars Aimee Baruah and Raag Oinitom, was directed by Jadumoni Dutta and produced by Noorul Sultan for Maina Industrial Co-Operative Society Ltd. The storyline is set to the backdrop of an interior village of Assam, India in the 1970s, which has never seen progress and prosperity, and tells the story of Radha, a young woman of lower caste fighting against corruption and for the rights of her community.

Jetuka Pator Dore won the Best Feature Film in Assamese award in the 58th National Film Awards for 2010.

== Plot ==
In an interior village of Assam in the 1970s, poor farmers and fishermen are always exploited by contractor Jamuna Hazarika, a wealthy villager.

Radha (Aimee Barua), an orphan grew up in the family of her maternal uncle Nakul (Arun Hazarika) and his wife who had no offspring. Rajat (Raag Oinitom), also an orphan stayed with them as household help. Radha and Rajat spent childhood together. When they grows ups, Nakul arranged Rajat's stay at a small thatched house built at the rear side of the orchard of the village school teacher Hemdhar (Bishnu Kharghoria). But the intimacy between Rajat and Radha remained the same.

Having passed out matriculation, Radha joined the local college and with her talent and intelligence she soon became popular among students and teachers. Of the teachers, professor Mahanta (Biki) showed special interest in her. But Radha was more impressed by professor Naren Dutta (Kopil Bora), a shy, introvert man by nature and with strong ethical principle. As the result, rumour was spread in the village of Radha having affair with both the Professors.

Radha got involved in the village affairs, and she influenced Rajat to think the course of action logically. Radha and Rajat joined the mission of smashing up country liquor joints and also questioned on the morality of Jamuna Hazarika in running licensed liquor outlet. Radha, along with Rajat, took initiative and exposed all wrongdoings of Hazarika and his son Muhidhar in their process of construction of the dam.

Finally, the monsoon downpour dropped in. Unabated heavy shower for days did the same to the villagers what they have been witnessing since ages. The dam constructed by Hazarika proved to be a farce because Muhidhar and his unholy nexus cut the base of the dam in the darkness of the downpour night. The entire area became submerged with water.

The flood relief distribution team of the college led by professor Mahanta enjoyed the mission with joy and fun like having a picnic. Radha, disturbed, annoyed and tormented mentally, while standing on the bank of the devastating river, recalls the words of her most admired professor Naren Dutta : "You’ve suffered, I’ve suffered. Only we have to struggle for our own dignity, we’ve got to fight."

== Cast ==
- Aimee Baruah as Radha
- Raag Oinitom as Rajat
- Arun Hazarika as Nakul
- Bishnu Kharghoria as school teacher Hemdhar
- Kopil Bora as professor Naren Dutta
- Biki as professor Mahanta

== Production ==
After the commercial success of debut film "Agnisakshi" and winning two institutional awards for best debut director, "Jetuka Pator Dore" is the second venture of Jadumoni Dutta as a director. Speaking about the film he said, "Basic essence of the storyline deals with strong determination of our young generation to make free the society from corruption, exploitation on economically underprivileged section and classification of people on the basis of caste and creed.... I want my audience to feel the pain of suffered through my film."

It was filmed in original location where the novel is based on, Dergaon area of Golaghat, Assam. The flood scene of the films were shot on actual flood.

== Release ==
=== Film Festivals ===
The film was first screened on 23 April 2011 at First Gandhinagar International Film Festival held from 21 to 24 April 2011. The director was also invited to present the film. The film is also scheduled to screen on South Asian Film Festival, which was held on Goa from 15 to 18 September 2011. In this festival also the director is invited to present the film.

=== Critical reception ===
The film was generally met with positive reviews by critics. Utpal Mena of Niyomiya Barta praising the director said that the later had expressed the story wonderfully with the language of camera. He also mentioned the acting of Aimee Barua and Raag Ainitam as a surprise package. The performance of Aimee Barua in a non-glamarous role of Radha is considered as the best performance of her till date by many critics.

== Awards ==
The film won the Best Feature Film in Assamese award in the 58th National Film Awards for 2010.

In Prag Cine Award 2011, the Jetuka Pator Dore team received 9 nominations, surprisingly not nominating for Best Film, and won 4 of it. The winning categories include Best Actress, Best Editor, Best Lyrics and Best Female Playback Singer.

Hemanta Dutta won the Best Lyrics award for "Biphal Sakupanire" in the Assam State Film Awards for the period 2010–2012, which was presented on 10 March 2013 at Machkhowa, Guwahati.

Year	Award	Category	Nominee	Result	Ref
2010	58th National Film Awards	Best Feature Film in Assamese	Noorul Sultan and Jadumoni Dutta	Won	
2011	Prag Cine Award	Best Actress	Aimee Barua	Won	
2011	Prag Cine Award	Best Editor	Rupam Kalita	Won	
2011	Prag Cine Award	Best Female Playback Singer	Anindita Paul for "Biphal Sakupanire"	Won	
2011	Prag Cine Award	Best Lyrics	Hemanta Dutta for "Biphal Sakupanire"	Won	
2011	Prag Cine Award	Best Actor	Raag Ainitam	Nominated	
2011	Prag Cine Award	Best Supporting Actor	Arun Hazarika	Nominated	
2011	Prag Cine Award	Best Male Playback Singer	Zubeen Garg for "Puwar Hanhit"	Nominated	
2011	Prag Cine Award	Best Art Direction	Jadumoni Dutta	Nominated	
2011	Prag Cine Award	Best Cinematography	Siddhartha Barua	Nominated	
2010-2012	Assam State Film Awards	Best Lyrics	Hemanta Dutta for "Biphal Sakupanire"	Won	

== Soundtrack ==
Jetuka Pator Dore

Soundtrack album by Palash Gogoi
- Released: 31 July 2011 (Audio CD); 2 August 2011 (Audio Cassette)
- Genre: Film soundtrack
- Length: 44:46
- Label: Regional Music Centre (RMC)

The soundtrack was composed by Palash Gogoi. The audio was launched in Guwahati on 31 July 2011 by prominent singer of Assam Dwipen Baruah. The album consists of ten tracks, of which only two are used in the movie. These two tracks are "Puwar Hanhit" and "Biphal Sakupanire."

Tracklist
No.	Title	Singer(s)	Length
1.	"Puwar Hahit"	Zubeen Garg	3:44
2.	"Ebar Shudhana (Duet)"	Santa Uzir, Simanta Sekhar	4:31
3.	"Palakate"	Dikshu	5:00
4.	"Pakhila Porise"	Zubeen Garg	3:01
5.	"Aai Tore"	Chayanika Bhuyan	4:52
6.	"Naajitora"	Dikshu	3:48
7.	"Puwar Hahit (Duet)"	Zubeen Garg, Santa Uzir	3:45
8.	"Ebar Shudhana"	Santa Uzir	4:30
9.	"Sheetal Sheetal"	Dikshu, Zublee	5:38
10.	"Biphal Sakupanire"	Anindita Paul	5:57
Total length:			44:46
