= Asha Bordoloi =

Indian actress and politician

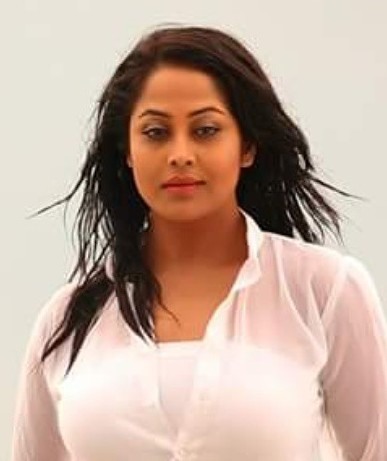
- Bordoloi in 2015
- Born: Barhampur, Nagaon, Assam
- Education: BA
- Occupations: Actress; Politician; Singer
- Years active: 2004–present
- Known for: Kothanodi; Dwaar; Jeevan Baator Logori
- Political party: Bharatiya Janata Party (2020–present)

General Secretary of BJP Mahila Morcha, Assam
- Incumbent
- Assumed office 4 October 2025

Asha Bordoloi is an Indian actress and politician who works mainly in Assamese cinema. She has acted in a number of Assamese movies and stage dramas. She is best known for her role Malati in the National award-winning film Kothanodi.

== Early life ==
Asha Bordoloi was born at Barhampur in Nagaon district, Assam.

== Political career ==
Bordoloi joined Bharatiya Janata Party on 18 August 2020. She served as the Cultural Committee In-charge of the Bharatiya Janata Yuva Morcha.

Bordoloi served as the state secretary of state's Mahila Morcha from 7 September 2021, until 4 October 2025 when she was appointed the General Secretary of BJP Mahila Morcha, Assam.

== Filmography ==
=== Films ===
- All films are in Assamese unless otherwise noted.

Year	Film	Role	Ref.
2004	Manat Birinar Jui	Chandana	
2005	Bogitora	Minati	
2006	Dipali	Reena	
2007	Rangdhali	Sonali	
2009	Jeevan Baator Logori	Dipali	
2013	Dwaar		
2015	Kothanodi	Malati	
2017	Hekh Adhyai	Arnav's wife	Short film
2021	Life in a Puppet		
2024	Iron Girls	Janoki	

=== Television ===
She acted in few television serials.

- Junbai
- Anurag
- Xahu Buwari
- Umal Bukur Xejar Kahini
- Sabda
- Jeevon Dot Com
- Mukha
- Anjali

=== Stage plays ===
Few of her stage plays are:

- Siraj

== Discography ==
Year	Song	Album	Language	Co-Singer(s)	Composer	Notes	Ref.
2025	"Enekoiye Bhagene Xopun"	Single	Assamese	Dikshu Sarma	Rajdweep	Times Music	
