= Admitted =

- Official Poster
- Directed by: Ojaswwee Sharma
- Written by: Ojaswwee Sharma
- Produced by: Pinaka Mediaworks
- Starring: Dhananjay Chauhan
- Edited by: Bhasker Pandey
- Release date: 13 June 2020
- Running time: 118 Minutes
- Country: India
- Languages: English, Hindi

Admitted is a 2020 Indian Hindi-language docudrama film directed by Chandigarh-based director Ojaswwee Sharma. The film is about Dhananjay Chauhan, the first transgender student at Panjab University. The role of Dhananjay Chauhan has been played by Dhananjay himself.

Admitted was declared best documentary at 17th Mumbai International Film Festival, and won the Silver Conch award for Best Documentary Film (above 60 minutes) in the National Competition section. It won the National Film Award – Special Jury Award (feature film) at the 68th National Film Awards.

== Plot ==
The film, narrated by Dhananjay Chauhan, tells the story of five decades of the life of Dhananjay, a doctoral scholar at Panjab University It focuses on Dhananjay's struggles to uplift her life and the transgender community to mainstream society. It also depicts Dhananjay's crusade against authorities for the transgender rights.

== Production ==
Produced by Pinaka Mediaworks, the film was announced in August 2018. The film was shot in and around Panjab University campus. The film is around two hours long. Director Ojaswwee Sharma, also an alumnus of Panjab University, said in the interview that he "wanted to explore this famous example of transgender education in a mainstream public university in North India, and the development of transgender rights, education and acceptance to the mainstream".

== Release ==
The film was to release in March 2020 on International Transgender Day of Visibility, but due to COVID-19 lockdown in India, the release was delayed. It was released on Rolling Frames Entertainment's YouTube channel on 13 June 2020.

== Reception ==
Admitted won the Silver Conch award for Best Documentary Film at 17th Mumbai International Film Festival. The jury noted "film's forceful and brave lead character, and how the subject has been dealt with by the filmmaker". The film also won the National Film Award – Special Jury Award (feature film) at 68th National Film Awards.

The film was also shown at several film festivals including NFDC Film Bazaar, Goa; Jagran Film Festival, Mumbai; Bioscope Global Film Festival, Amritsar; Tarang - Delhi International Queer Theatre & Film Festival; and Impact Doc Awards, California.
