= Mr Joe B. Carvalho =

2014 Indian film by Samir Tewari

- Theatrical release poster
- Directed by: Samir Tiwari
- Screenplay by: Mahesh Ramchandani
- Story by: Mahesh Ramchandani
- Produced by: Bhola Ram Malviya; Shital Malviya
- Starring: Arshad Warsi; Soha Ali Khan; Javed Jaffrey; Vijay Raaz; Mahika Sharma
- Cinematography: Aseem Bajaj
- Edited by: Dharmendra Sharma
- Music by: Amartya Bobo Rahut
- Distributed by: B.R Entertainment
- Release date: 3 January 2014
- Running time: 130 minutes
- Country: India
- Language: Hindi

Mr Joe B. Carvalho is a 2014 Indian Hindi-language comedy film that was released on 3 January 2014. The film is directed by Samir Tewari, and produced by Shital Malviya and Bhola Ram Malviya (Arshad Warsi's long standing secretary). The film stars Arshad Warsi, Soha Ali Khan, Javed Jaffrey and Vijay Raaz. The first teaser of the film was released on 17 November 2013. The film also has guest appearances by Geeta Basra, Mahika Sharma and Karishma Kotak. Singer Babul Supriyo debuts in the film by playing a cameo. The movie's title itself is a wordplay on the Hindi phrase Jo bhi karwa lo (translated as "Get anything done").

== Plot ==
Mr Joe B. Carvalho (Arshad Warsi) is your (slightly below average) corny-go-lucky private eye in the quest for a truly challenging case that can bring in money and fame and change his fortunes for good. A moneyed Khurana (Shakti Kapoor) hands him a case to find his eloped daughter.

Meanwhile, Joe's ex-girlfriend Inspector Shantipriya Fadnis (Soha Ali Khan) is chasing an international criminal, Carlos (Jaaved Jaffrey), a lollypop-sucking international terrorist who is in town with a big murder plot. A local underworld don, MK (Vijay Raaz), has been roped in to help Carlos, but with the intention of killing him.

The detective, inspector, and don end up in the terrorist's hotel room, and Joe is mistaken for Carlos. Both MK and Shantipriya are now on his trail, whereas clueless Joe ends up spying on the wrong girl.

== Cast ==
- Arshad Warsi as Joe B. Carvalho/B. Carvalho, Joe's father (double role)
- Soha Ali Khan as Inspector Shantipriya Fadnis
- Jaaved Jaffrey as Carlos/Big See
- Virendra Saxena as Naidu
- Vijay Raaz as Monty Kalra
- Shakti Kapoor as Khurana
- Vrajesh Hirjee as Hira
- Rajesh Balwani as Moti
- Geeta Basra as Gehna
- Karishma Kotak as Neena Khurana
- Ranjeet as Anil Virani
- Himani Shivpuri as Joe's mother
- Manoj Joshi as Commissioner Pandey
- Snehal Dhabi as General Kopa Bhalerao Kabana
- Kunal Khemu in a Cameo Appearance
- Mahika Sharma in a Cameo Appearance
- Babul Supriyo as Malik
- Chitra Shenoy as Sundari

== Production ==
The film's producers, Bholaram and Shital Malviya, invited directors Rohit Shetty, Subhash Kapoor and Indra Kumar to unveil the first teaser look of the film in Mumbai on 16 November 2013. The first look of the film was unveiled on 2 November 2013. Arshad Warsi plays a detective and Soha Ali Khan plays the role of a police officer. Soha learnt martial arts for her role. Ajay Bagdai bought the all-India distribution rights of the film. The theatrical trailer of film was unveiled on the show Bigg Boss on 24 November 2013.

=== Filming ===
Soha Ali Khan wore a bikini for the first time on-screen in this Bollywood film. The film was shot in Goa, Mumbai and Bangalore. Arshad Warsi also choreographed one of his own songs in the film. Soha also performed a cabaret in the film. Jaaved Jaaferi's character's name is 'Carlos' and he sported quirky looks each time he comes on screen. Some of them are that of an Afro man, a blonde woman, a sadhu baba and a Maharashtrian woman. Kunal Khemu did a special appearance in the film.

=== Marketing ===
Arshad Warsi and Soha Ali Khan promoted the film on Bigg Boss 7, during its trailer release. Arshad and Soha also promoted the film on Comedy Nights with Kapil.

== Soundtrack ==
Mr Joe B. Carvalho

Soundtrack album by Amartya Bobo Rahut
- Released: 6 December 2013
- Recorded: 2012–2013
- Genre: Soundtrack
- Length: 16:54
- Label: T-Series
- Producers: Amartya Bobo Rahut, T-Series, BR Entertainment

Amartya Bobo Rahut chronology
What the Fish (2013)	Mr Joe B. Carvalho (2013)

Shefali Alvares sung an item number for the film, composed by Amartya Bobo Rahut. Amitabh Bhattacharya, Virag Mishra have written the lyrics for the film. The entire soundtrack for the film composed by Amartya Bobo Rahut was released on the digital music platform iTunes on 6 December 2013 consisting of 5 tracks.

All lyrics are written by Amitabh Bhattacharya, Virag Mishra, Puneet Sharma and Jaaved Jaaferi.

Track listing
No.	Title	Lyrics	Singer(s)	Length
1.	"Chumma Chaati"	Amitabh Bhattacharya	Shefali Alvares, Amartya Bobo Rahut, Pinky Maidasani	5:06
2.	"Mind Blastic"	Puneet Sharma	Neeraj Shridhar	2:42
3.	"Ring Ring"	Virag Mishra	Subhajit Mukherjee	2:56
4.	"Ae Ji Suniye"	Virag Mishra	Humsika Iyer, Amartya Bobo Rahut	4:08
5.	"Carlos"	Javed Jaffrey	Javed Jaffrey	2:02
Total length:				16:54

== Box office ==
The film grossed around ₹ 22.5 million nett over the first weekend. The film went down on Monday with collections around ₹ 30–35 million nett. Thus the film, made on a budget of around ₹15 million, more or less managed to recover its money.

== See also ==
- List of Bollywood films of 2014
