= Ahir Bhairav (film) =

Ahir Bhairav (Songs of the Dawn)
- Film poster of Ahir Bhairav
- Directed by: Siva Prasad Thakur
- Written by: Pankaj Thakur
- Produced by: Dr Ranen Sarma
- Starring: Kopil Bora; Zerifa Wahid; Purabi Sarma; Bidyut Chakravarty; Mridula Barua
- Cinematography: Nirmal Deka (Tito)
- Edited by: Kaju
- Music by: Hemanta Goswami; Rajeswar Bordoloi (Bulu)
- Production company: Rondeep Productions (UK) Ltd
- Release date: 6 April 2007
- Running time: 104 minutes
- Countries: India; UK
- Language: Assamese

Ahir Bhairav (English: Songs of the Dawn) is a 2007 Indian Assamese language drama film directed by Siva Prasad Thakur and produced by Dr Ronen Sarma, under the banner of Rondeep Productions (UK) Ltd. This is the first ever Assamese movie that was entirely shot in the UK and was the Assamese's second film to be shot outside India after Hiya Diya Niya (2000). It has been chosen by the British Film Institute, London, to be preserved in its archive.

Director Siva Prasad Thakur had won the best international director award for this film at the New York Independent International Film Festival, 2008.

== Synopsis ==
The story revolves around a PIO Indian woman with schizophrenia and its impact on those close to her.

== Casts ==
- Kopil Bora as Ruben
- Zerifa Wahid as Nikita
- Purabi Sarma as Manisha
- Bidyut Chakravarty as Ravik
- Mridula Barua as Jolly
- Madhurima Chowdhury as Angelika
- Ellora Barua (Guest appearance)
- Gita Lahkar (Guest appearance)
- Munmi Chakravarty (Guest appearance)
- Kirip Chaliha (Guest appearance)
- Abani Bora (Guest appearance)
- Siva Prasad Thakur (Guest appearance)
- Alex Knight (Guest appearance)
- Sarah Rose (Guest appearance)

== See also ==
- Jollywood
