= Bukuwe Bisare =

- Film poster of Bukuwe Bisare
- Directed by: Dipankar Kashyap
- Produced by: Shikha Kashyap; Dipali Chowdhury
- Starring: Kapil Bora; Zerifa Wahid; Ravi Sarma
- Music by: Manash Hazarika
- Production company: Spriha Production
- Release date: 16 July 2004
- Country: India
- Language: Assamese

Bukuwe Bisare is an Assamese language film directed by fashion designer Dipankar Kashyap. It is a debut film of the director produced by his sister Shikha Kashyap and Dipali Chowdhury. The film stars Kapil Bora, Zerifa Wahid and Ravi Sarma. The story is about friendship and love shot in exotic locales in Kalimpong and Sikkim. The lyrics are penned by Prasanta Morang.

== See also ==
- Jollywood
