= The Saviour Brig. Pritam Singh =

The Saviour Brig. Pritam Singh is a Punjabi docudrama, that lasted from November 1947 to November 1948. It was directed by Paramjeet Singh Kattu and won National Film Award for Best Investigative Film at 66th National Film Awards.

The film was awarded for Cult Critic Movie Awards in 2022.
