= Aimee Baruah =

Indian actress, producer, director

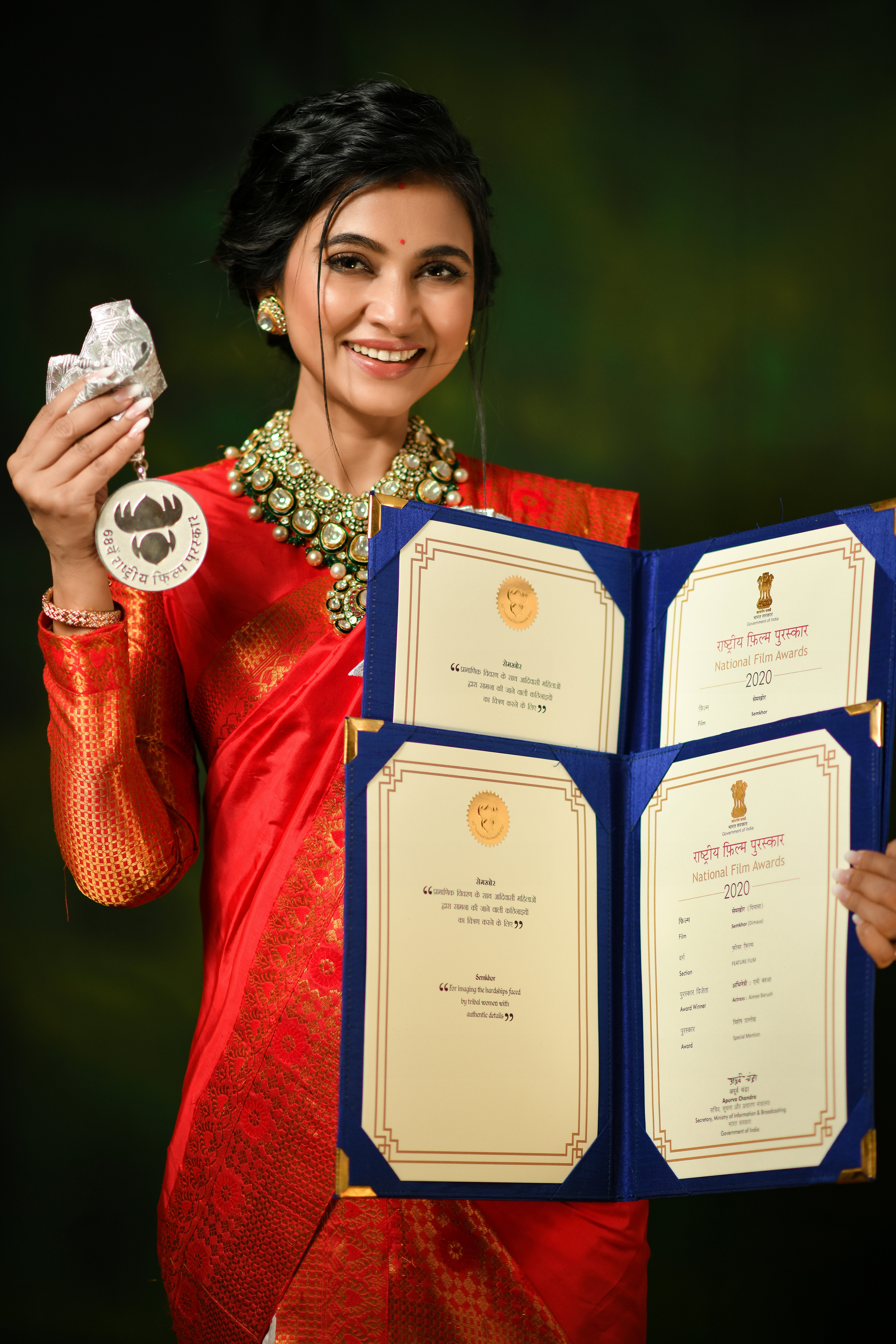
- Aimee Baruah with her National Award in 2022
- Born: Nagaon, Assam, India
- Occupations: Actress; producer; director
- Years active: 2001-present
- Notable work: Semkhor (2021)
- Spouse: Pijush Hazarika (m. 2011)

Aimee Baruah is an Indian actress, producer, and director. She has won three National Film Awards for both feature films and non-feature films.

== Early life ==
Baruah was born in Nagaon to Mala Baruah and Purna Baruah, a police superintendent. She holds a master's degree in sociology. She is currently pursuing her PhD from Gauhati University on the films of singer, musician, and filmmaker Bhupen Hazarika.

== Career ==
Since starting her career at fourteen, she has starred in over twenty-nine feature-length films, including several National Award-winning films.

Her directorial debut was the Dimasa language film Semkhor. The film received two National Awards at the 68th National Film Awards. She also became the first actress from Assam to walk down the red carpet at the 75th Cannes Film Festival.

Her documentary film, Screaming Butterflies, was bestowed with Silver Conch award at the 17th Mumbai International Film Festival. (MIFF). She was a jury member at the 53rd International Film Festival of India (IFFI) as well as a member of the steering committee at the 54th International Film Festival of India (IFFI), held in Goa. She became the first Assamese actress to receive the "Best Actress in a Leading Role" award at the first edition of the Filmfare Awards Assamese 2024.

Her latest documentary film, "Birubala: Witch to Padmashree" which chronicles a tribal woman's fight against witchcraft and witch hunting, initially in Goalpara and then throughout Assam, has been honored with the Jury's Special Mention Award at the 70th National Film Awards for the year 2022.

== Personal life ==
Aimee Baruah married Bharatiya Janta Party (BJP) politician and Minister Pijush Hazarika on 1 October 2011.

== Filmography ==
=== As an actress ===
Year	Film	Role	Notes	Ref
2002	Prem Aru Prem		Debut film	
2005	Kadamtole Krishna Nache		Assamese drama film	
2011	Jetuka Pator Dore	Radha	Assamese drama film based on the novel of the same name by Syed Abdul Malik	
2013	Karma Ke Rati	Laxmi Nayak	Assamese-Sadri film	
2013	Mahasamar			
2017	Priyaar Priyo		Special appearance in the song "Priyaar Priyo".	
2018	Nijanor Gaan	Ragini		
2019	Pratighaat			
2021	Semkhor	Mother	Dimasa language film	
2023	Rongatapu 1982	Morom		

=== As director ===
Year	Film	Producer	Notes	Ref
2021	Semkhor	Yes	Dimasa language film	

== Awards ==
Year	Film	Award	Category	Result	Ref
2011	Jetuka Pator Dore	Prag Cine Awards	Best Actress	Won	
2022	Semkhor	68th National Film Awards	Best feature in Dimasa	Special Mention	
