= Kothanodi =

Kothanodi (The River of Fables)
- Official poster of Kothanodi
- Directed by: Bhaskar Hazarika
- Written by: Bhaskar Hazarika; Dr. Arupa Patangia Kalita
- Based on: Traditional indigenous Assamese Folk tales
- Produced by: Anurupa Hazarika, Crowdfunders
- Starring: Seema Biswas; Adil Hussain; Zerifa Wahid
- Cinematography: Vijay Kutty
- Edited by: Suresh Pai
- Music by: Amarnath Hazarika
- Production company: Metanormal Motion Pictures
- Release dates: 10 October 2015 (BIFF); 16 September 2016 (Assam)
- Running time: 115 minutes
- Country: India
- Language: Assamese

Kothanodi (English: The River of Fables) is an Indian Assamese language feature film written and directed by Bhaskar Hazarika and stars Seema Biswas, Adil Hussain, Zerifa Wahid, Urmila Mahanta, Kopil Bora and Asha Bordoloi. The story of the film is based on traditional indigenous folktales from Assam, India.

Kothanodi won the Asian Cinema Fund's Post Production Fund Award for 2015, and was first screened at the 20th Busan International Film Festival which was held from 1 to 10 October 2015. In April 2016, The film won the Best Feature Film in Assamese award in the 63rd National Film Awards.

== Story ==
Kothanodi is based on characters and events described in Burhi Aair Sadhu (Grandma's Tales), a popular compendium of folk stories compiled by Assamese literary giant Lakshminath Bezbaroa. The four fables referenced in the film are Tejimola, Champawati, Ou Kuwori (The Outenga Maiden) and Tawoir Xadhu (The Story of Tawoi).

Once upon a time, Senehi, a schizophrenic woman who loathes her stepdaughter, plots her murder when her husband is called away on a distant trip on business. Her husband, Devinath, encounters a woman called Keteki who has given birth to an outenga (elephant apple), which rolls around after her. Devinath resolves to unearth the mystery of the outenga.

Meanwhile, in another village, a rich woman named Dhoneshwari is getting her daughter married to a python - a wedding that has dire consequences for the girl. As these three stories unfold, another mother, Malati, resolves to save her newest born from the clutches of her husband Poonai and his uncle, who have sacrificed all three of her previous babies. In doing so, she unearths a shocking truth.

== Cast ==
- Seema Biswas as Dhoneshwari
- Adil Hussain as Devinath
- Zerifa Wahid as Senehi
- Urmila Mahanta as Keteki
- Kopil Bora as Poonai
- Asha Bordoloi as Malati
- Kasvi Sharma as Tejimola
- Monisha Bhuyan as Bonlotika
- Dr Jayanta Das as Jagannath
- Pradhan Deori as The Jackal

== Production ==
In an interview, writer-director Bhaskar Hazarika described the film as "a dark and moody narrative offering alternate interpretations of characters in these well known traditional indigenous folk tales, especially the female characters."

Kothanodi was filmed in two locations in Assam, the largest river island in the world, Majuli and the riverbanks along Dergaon, over two schedules in 2014. In between, funds for the film were raised through a successful crowdfunding campaign through the crowdfunding platform Wishberry. The Kothanodi campaign has been one of the most successful campaigns in Wishberry's history.

Kothanodi won the Asian Cinema Fund's Post Production Fund Award for 2015, and DI and colouring of the film was done in the Korean Film Council (KOFIC) laboratory in Seoul, South Korea as part of the grant.

== Release ==
Kothanodi had its world premiere at the 20th Busan International Film Festival held from 1 to 10 October 2015. The film subsequently screened in several film festivals including 59th BFI London Film Festival, 17th Jio MAMI Mumbai Film Festival, and the 4th Dharamshala International Film Festival. In January 2016, the film received its Nordic Premiere at the 39th Goteborg International Film Festival, where the film was screened as The River of Fables. Kothanodi and Chauranga were the only Indian films screened in that edition of the festival. The film received its US premiere as an official selection at the 14th edition of the Indian Film Festival of Los Angeles in April 2016. The movie was showcased in Stockholm as a part of Cinema Indien during April 2016. Since then it has been screened at film festivals in Calgary, Austin TX, New York City, Stuttgart, New Delhi, Paris, The Hague, and Melbourne.

The film received a theatrical release in its home province of Assam on September 16, 2016. Kothanodi was premiered in Assam in the river island of Majuli, where most of its principal photography was completed. This marked the first time a film had been premiered in Majuli, a UN Heritage site. Subsequently, the film received a statewide release and had a successful four week run. Kothanodi was also the first ever Assamese film to be picked up for worldwide digital distribution by streaming service Netflix and second Assamese film picked up by SonyLIV.

== Accolades ==
Kothanodi was awarded the Best Feature Film in Assamese in 63rd National Film Awards. It also received ten Prag Cine Awards nominations and won in four categories: Bhaskar Hazarika for Best Screenplay, Kasvi Sarma for Best Supporting Actor Female, Gulok Saha for Best Art Direction, and Rani Dutta Baruah for Best Costume. In October 2016, the film received the ‘Prix du Jury étudiant’ (Student Jury Prize) at the Festival du Film d’Asie du Sud, Paris.
