= Paramjeet Singh Kattu =

Indian filmmaker

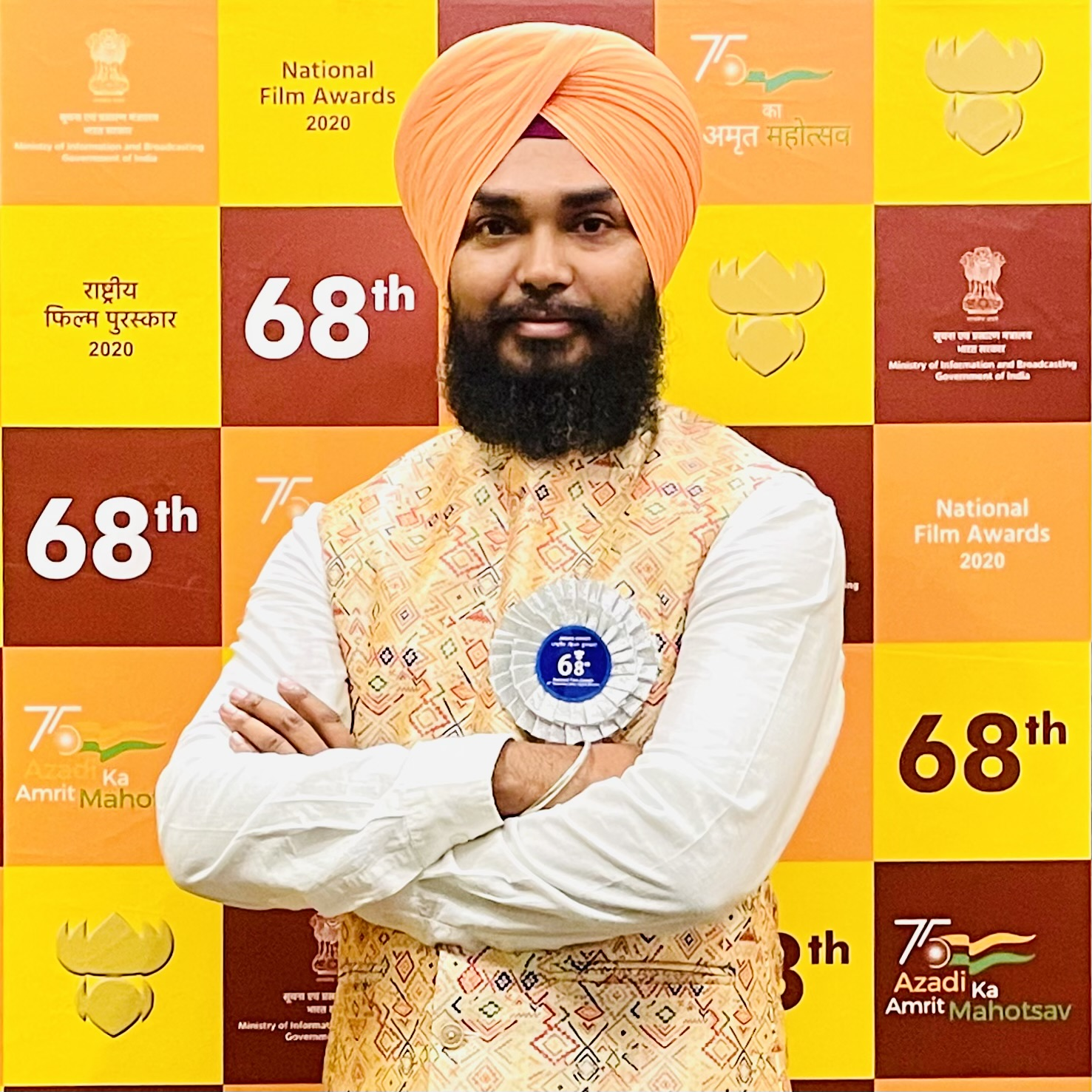

Paramjeet Singh Kattu is an Indian filmmaker and academic known for his directorial work in The Saviour Brig. Pritam Singh which won the National Film Award for Best Investigative Film.

== Early life and education ==
Paramjeet Kattu holds a Ph.D. in literature and has spent over a decade in the field of filmmaking. His academic background informs his approach to storytelling, emphasizing research and authenticity in his work.

== Filmmaking career ==
Paramjeet Kattu has directed several notable films, each demonstrating his talent and dedication to the craft. His early work includes the short film "Adda Khadda" (2012), which explores the complexities of life through a folk sport of Punjab. He gained further recognition with his critically acclaimed films "Stray Star" (2018) and "Teaseailure" (2021), which received awards and accolades for their artistic excellence.
