= Santhosh Mada =

Indian filmmaker

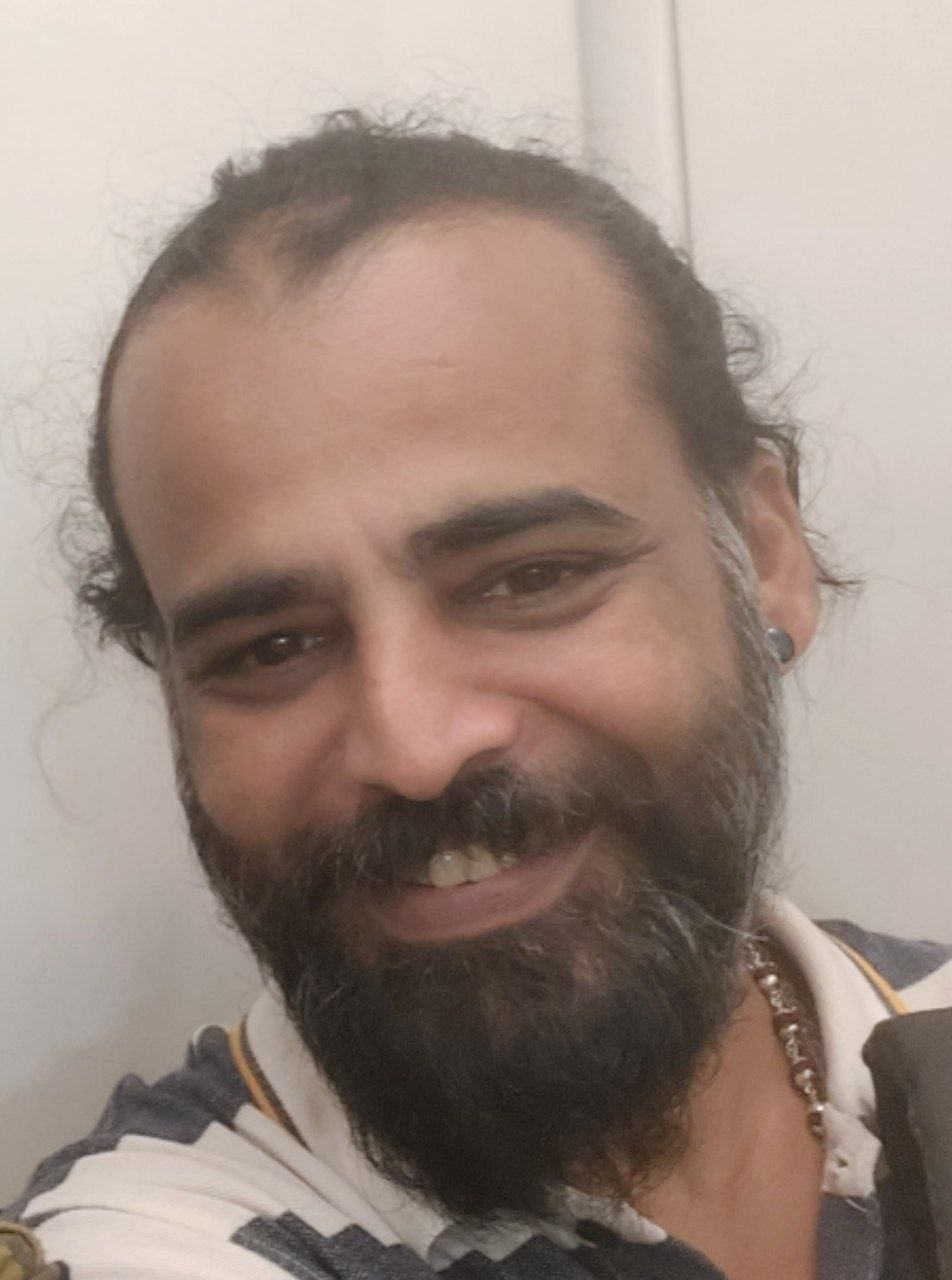
- Born: Kaithapram, Kannur
- Occupation: Film director
- Spouse: Meera
- Parents: Shambhu Namboothiri (father); Saraswathy (mother)
- Relatives: Kaithapram Damodaran Namboothiri (uncle); Kaithapram Viswanathan Namboothiri (uncle); Deepankuran Kaithapram (cousin)
- Awards: National Film Awards (1)

Santhosh Mada is an Indian filmmaker who works in South Indian cinema. He has received the national award for his Film Jeetige in Tulu Category.

== Early life and career ==
Santhosh was born to Shambhu Nambudiri and Saraswathy. He was born and brought up in Mangalore and had his schooling in Kannada medium. During his childhood, he spent about 10 years at his uncle Kaithapram Damodaran Namboodiri's home.

Santhosh has worked with Jayaraj and Kamal as assistant director. He has also worked with Abhaya Simha, Rosshan Andrrews and Pramod Payyannur. In 2021, his first directorial venture Jeetige won the National Award for the best film in Tulu category. He directed Mogajjana Koli in 2022. Mogajjana Koli is the first film in Arebhashe, a dialect of Kannada spoken by Gowda and other communities.

== Filmography ==
Year	Title	Language
2020	Jeetige	Tulu
2022	Mogajjana Koli	Arebhashe
2025	Pidayi	Tulu

== Awards ==
Year	Award	Venue	Film
2020	Best film in Tulu Category	National Film Awards	Jeetige
