= Mahika Sharma =

Indian actress and Social worker

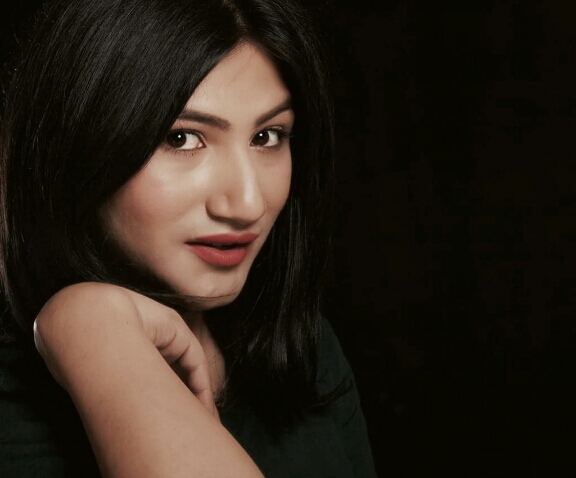
- Mahika Sharma, Indian actress, Model
- Born: 26 July 1994 (age 32); Tinsukia, Assam, India
- Occupations: Actress, model
- Awards: Miss Teen Northeast

Mahika Sharma is an Indian actress. She won a beauty pageant, becoming the Miss Teen Northeast. She has also appeared in Indian television serials.

Sharma has appeared in television show F.I.R. (TV series) and Bollywood movie Mr Joe B. Carvalho.

== Philanthropy ==
Sharma has helped in a sex workers' rehab programme. She is also working for the state to develop its culture and tradition.

== Filmography ==
- Mr Joe B. Carvalho
- Mardaani
- Ramayan
- The Suite Life of Karan & Kabir
- Tu Mere Agal Bagal Hai
- F.I.R.
- Chalo Dilli
- Mon Jaai 2008 Assamese Film
- Swaraj as Chellamma
