= Kopil Bora =

Indian actor (born 1977)

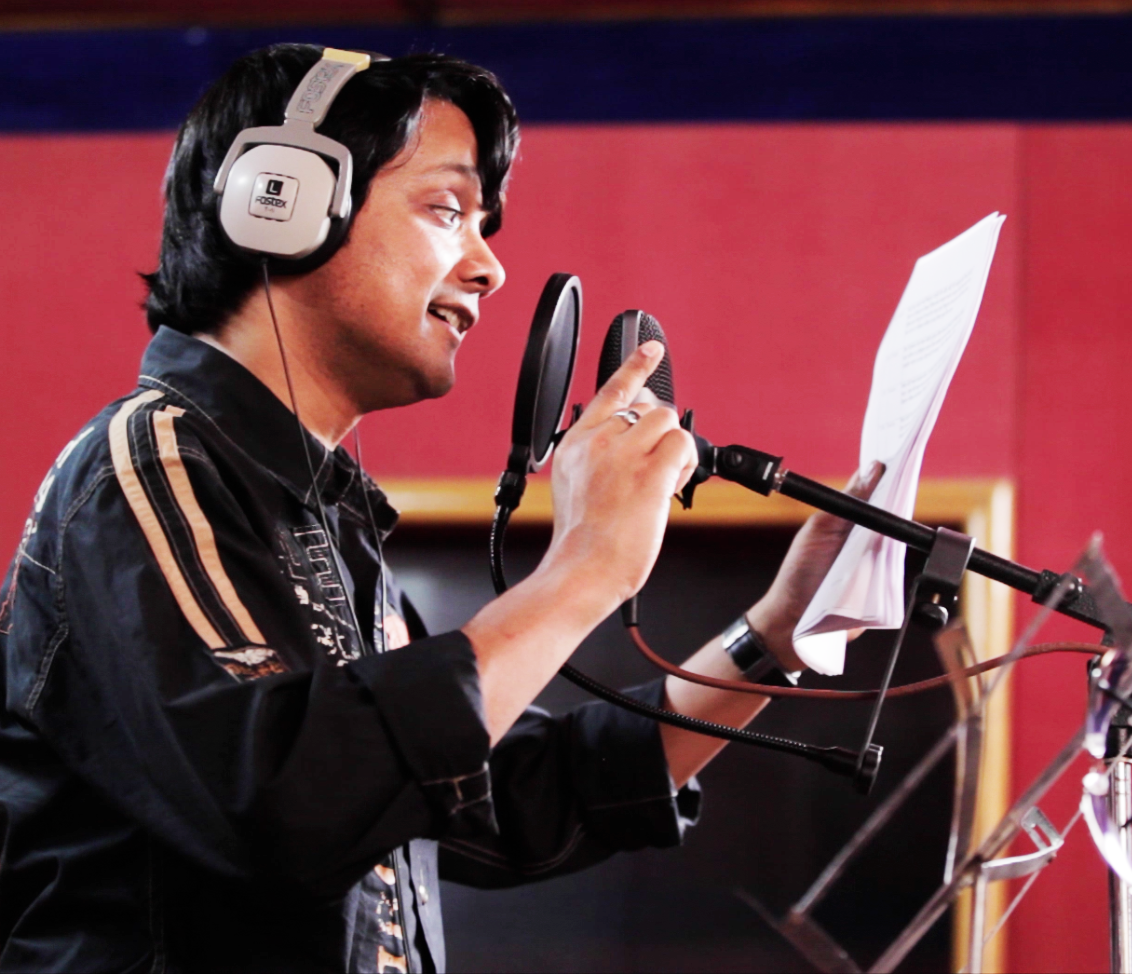
- Kopil Bora recording his voice for the Axomiya language version of TeachAids at Auditek Digital Recording Studio in Guwahati, Assam
- Born: 30 March 1977 (age 49); Guwahati, Assam, India
- Other names: Kiku; Mr. Perfectionist of Jollywood
- Occupations: Actor, anchor, voice artist
- Years active: 2002 - present

Kopil Bora (born 30 March 1977) is an Assamese actor, anchor, and All India Radio voice artist. He debuted in Bidyut Chakravarty's 2002 Assamese film Gun Gun Gane Gane and is known for his performance in Mon (2002), Ahir Bhairav (2008), Jetuka Pator Dore (2011), and Dwaar (2013).

== Early life ==
Kopil Bora attended high school at Don Bosco High School, Guwahati, and later attended college at Cotton College, Guwahati. He currently resides in Guwahati.

== Career ==
=== Feature films ===
Kopil Bora has appeared in numerous Assamese films. He debut film was Gun Gun Gane Gane (2002), directed by Bidyut Chakravarty. Additionally, his movie Mon was released later that year. His other films include Bidhata (2003), Kadambari (2008), Ahir Bhairav (2008), Jeevan Baator Logori (2009), Jetuka Pator Dore (2011), Dwaar (2013) and Raag: The Rhythm of Love (2014). In the 2013 film Dwaar, he played the mentally ill character Dwijen Bhattacharya.

=== Stage and television ===
Kopil Bora (second from left) in a drama with his co-stars Zerifa, Ravi Sarma and Mayuri

Kopil Bora acted in the play Narakor Gopan Kakhyat with Zerifa Wahid, staged in Rabindra Bhawan, Guwahati. It was an adaptation of the French play "In Camera" by Jean-Paul Sartre. In another play with Zerifa Wahid, Pancharatna, which was also staged in Rabindra Bhawan, he played a gay boy troubled by his sexuality. He was also the associate director of the play called Agnibristi where he played the lead role, under Zerifa Wahid's production, staged in Rabindra Bhawan. It was an adaptation of Girish Karnad's play The Fire and the Rain.

In television, he acted in an eight-episode Hindi mini-series titled Manushi (with seven stories by Sahitya Akademi award winner Sneha Devi), directed by Sanjib Hazarika for Doordarshan. His other television credit includes Niyoror Phool on News Live. He also hosted a spelling contest for children on Rang.

=== Mobile theatre ===
Kopil Bora debuted in Assam's roaming theatre with Ashirbad Theatre. He also acted in Rajmahal Theatre. The list of plays includes "Surongor Xekhot", a drama which was aired in the All India Radio in the 1980s, "Surjyo" and "Bhai".

== Other Activities ==
=== Compering and social causes ===
Kopil Bora has competed for Axom Idol - a Musical Talent search program hosted in NE TV, Sur-Taal-Loy, another musical talent program anchored by Kopil Bora in association with Barsha Rani Bishaya and Surajit Malakar Guwahati - and various New year's eve celebrations hosted in DD NE and participated in the cultural extravaganza in the closing function of the 33rd National games, held at Guwahati.

Kopil Bora gave the background narration for the documentary Friends of Kaziranga (2010), which honors the Kaziranga National Park's forest guards.

Bora inaugurated a 'clothes bank' at an event held at Hotel Brahmaputra Ashok, Guwahati, launched by a NGO, Xavier's Foundation, with the support of North Eastern Development Finance Corporation Limited (NEDFi), which is a financial and development institution formed under the DoNER ministry.

== Filmography ==
=== Assamese films ===
Year	Film	Director	Role
2002	Gun Gun Gane Gane	Bidyut Chakravarty	
2002	Mon	Bani Das	
2003	Bidhata	Munin Barua	
2004	Bukuwe Bisare	Dipankar Kashyap	
2005	Astaraag	Siva Prasad Thakur	
2007	Ahir Bhairav	Siva Prasad Thakur	
2008	Kadambari	Bani Das	
2009	Jeevan Baator Logori	Timothy Das Hanche	
2012	Jetuka Pator Dore	Jadumoni Dutta	
2013	Dwaar	Bidyut Chakravarty	
2014	Ajeyo	Jahnu Barua	
2014	Raag: The Rhythm of Love (2014)	Rajni Basumatary	
2015	Morisika	Nipon Dholua	
2016	Kothanodi	Bhaskar Hazarika	
2016	Gaane Ki Aane	Rajesh Jashpal	Special appearance in the song "Dancing Tonight"
2022	Sweater Whether	Priyom Das	

=== Bengali films ===
Year	Film	Director	Other Co-star(s)
2003	Mon	Bani Das	Ravi Sarma, Nishita Goswami

=== Music videos and television ===
1. Jan Oi Joubon Doi
2. Moromjaan (2007)
3. Ure Pakhi Meli
4. Ajanite Tumak
5. Moromi Priya
6. Rato Rani (Nepali)
7. Nargis (On the Assamese Muslim culture, by Biju Phukan)
8. Tora (produced by Nayan Nirban)
9. Rongpuror Nasonir Bihu
10. Niyoror Phool (Assamese serial)
