= Baruwati =

- village
- Interactive map of Baruwati
- Country: India
- State: Assam

Government
  - Body: Gram panchayat

Languages
  - Official: Assamese
- Time zone: UTC+5:30 (IST)
- ISO 3166 code: IN-AS
- Vehicle registration: AS

Baruwati is a small village situated at the North-West part of Nagaon district of Assam, India.

The village is in the locality of Dhing. Dhing town is 6 kilometers from the village. Connectivity of the village to other parts is good. It has four roads leading to Nagaon town via Bardowa, Bebejia via Jajori, Guwahati via Morigaon and to Dhing.

Climate of the village is well suited for cultivation. Though main production is paddy, other seeds and vegetables like pea, mustard oil, carot, cabbage, tomato, potato, etc. are also produced in good quantity.
