= Ratnakar (film) =

2019 film by Jatin Bora

- Theatrical release poster
- Directed by: Jatin Bora
- Written by: Atlee; Rahul Mech; Abhijit Bhattacharjya
- Produced by: Jatin Bora; Navanita Sharma Bora
- Starring: Jatin Bora; Barsha Rani Bishaya; Nishita Goswami
- Cinematography: Pradip Doimari
- Edited by: Pratim Khaound
- Music by: Zubeen Garg
- Production company: J.B. Production
- Release date: 11 October 2019
- Running time: 115 minutes
- Country: India
- Language: Assamese
- Budget: ₹1.7 crore
- Box office: est. ₹10 crore

Ratnakar: A New Myth of Love is a 2019 Indian Assamese-language action thriller film directed by Jatin Bora and produced by Bora and Navanita Sharma's J.B. Production. The film stars Bora and Barsha Rani Bishaya, with Nishita Goswami, Pabitra Bora, Chetana Das, and Sanjeev Hazarika in supporting roles and features young Ashramika Saikia.

== Plot ==
Jayanta is a responsible father from a remote village who lives with his beloved daughter Dubori. After Dubori is publicly reprimanded by a teacher for low grades, Jayanta confronts the teacher named Daisy, where he explains the struggles he has faced raising Dubori as a single parent. Daisy sympathises with his situation and decides to help Dubori with her studies. When some street thugs make fun of Dubori and Daisy in a park. Jayanta disguise himself as a robber at night and thrashes the thugs. Unbeknownst to Jayanta, Daisy sees this and gets shocked, where she learns about Jayanta's past.

Past: Jayanta is a kind-hearted gangster for Guwahati-based businessman Devaraj Choudhary where he meets Devaraj's daughter Manashi, who is studying abroad. When Manashi returns home, she gets attracted to Jayanta's kindness and they begin dating, although Manashi has no idea that Jayanta is working for her father. After learning about Jayanta's profession, Manashi tells him to get a legitimate job and she will support him. Jayanta quits being a gangster and finds an ordinary job. Manashi marries him, Despite opposition from Devaraj and her cruel brother Rakesh, Manashi marries Jayanta and becomes pregnant with Dubori. However, Manashi dies in a car crash, but Dubori is saved. Devaraj wants to take revenge on Jayanta by taking the baby from him, but Jayanta and Dubori escape to the remote village.

Present: Devaraj, Rakesh finds Dubori and kidnap her, but Jayanta rescues his daughter and also makes Devaraj and Rakesh realizes his mistakes. Jayantha, Dubori and Daisy ride back to their home.

== Cast ==
- Jatin Bora as Jayanta
- Barsha Rani Bishaya as Manashi
- Nishita Goswami as Daisy
- Ashramika Saikia as Dubori, Jayanta and Manashi's daughter
- Sanjeev Hazarika as Devaraj Choudhary, Manashi's father and Jayanta's former father-in-law
- Padmarag Goswami as Rakesh Choudhary, Manashi's brother
- Chetana Das as a senior citizen
- Bishnu Kharghoria as a senior citizen
- Rina Bora as a senior citizen
- Hiranya Deka as a senior citizen

== Soundtrack ==
Ratnakar

Soundtrack album by Zubeen Garg
- Released: 3 April 2019
- Length: 20:48
- Label: Dhwani Records

Zubeen Garg chronology
The Underworld (2018)	Ratnakar (2019)	Kanchanjangha (2019)

Ratnakar's soundtrack contains five songs composed by Zubeen Garg, and was released under the newly Assamese record label Dhwani Records. Songs were sung by Zubeen Garg, Gayatri Hazarika, Harchita Bhattacharya, Satabdi Borah, Navanita Sharma, Jashua Queah, and Synicah.

Track list
No.	Title	Lyrics	Artist (s)	Length
1.	"Eta Kotha"	Sasanka Samir	Zubeen Garg, Harchita Bhattacharya	4:02
2.	"Bhal Poware"	Rahul Gautam Sharma	Zubeen Garg, Satabdi Bora	4:10
3.	"Koli Meliley"	Rahul Gautam Sharma	Zubeen Garg, Navanita Sharma Bora	3:31
4.	"Rati Rati"	Zubeen Garg	Zubeen Garg, Gayatri Hazarika	5:32
5.	"Ratnakar"	Sasanka Samir	Joshua Queah, Synicah	3:33
Total length:				20:48

== Reception ==
=== Box office ===
Ratnakar was released on 11 October 2019 in 59 theatres in Assam and 11 theatres in Delhi, Mumbai, Pune, Bangalore and Hyderabad. The film had a positive audience response, with almost 80-percent theatre capacity during its first three days. It grossed ₹42 lakh on its opening day, the highest gross for an Assamese film to date. On the film's second day, it grossed ₹49.5 lakh. It earned ₹55 lakh and ₹43 lakh on its third and fourth days, respectively, bringing its total gross to ₹1.89 crore. The film earned a total of ₹3.31 crore in its first week, the Assamese film industry's highest first-week gross. After earning ₹68 lakh on 21 October 2019 (a Sunday), the film had a 10-day gross of ₹4.95 crore. It earned ₹6.63 crore in two weeks, an Assamese box-office record. According to Ratnakar's distributors, the film netted ₹9.23 crore by 14 November 2019.;

== See also ==
- Kanchanjangha
- Pratighat
