= Dr. Bezbaruah 2 =

2023 film by Nipon Goswami

- Directed by: Nipon Goswami (Note: Nipon Goswami passed away in October 2022; he will receive a posthumous director credit.)
- Written by: Rajdweep
- Screenplay by: Rajdweep; Nipon Goswami
- Story by: Rajdweep
- Produced by: Sanjive Narain; Akshata Narain
- Starring: Adil Hussain; Zubeen Garg; Siddharth Nipon Goswami; Kingkini Goswami; Nipon Goswami
- Cinematography: Hriday Gogoi
- Music by: Zubeen Garg
- Production company: AM Television
- Release date: 3 February 2023
- Running time: 110 minutes
- Country: India
- Language: Assamese
- Box office: ₹7 crore (US$730,000)

Dr. Bezbaruah 2 is an Indian Assamese-language suspense thriller film released on 3 February 2023. It is a sequel of Dr. Bezbarua, released 53 years prior. Dr. Bezbaruah 2 was directed by late Assamese actor, Nipon Goswami, who was also the lead actor of Dr. Bezbarua. The story, screenplay and dialogues are written by Rajdweep and music by Zubeen Garg. It was produced by Sanjive Narain and co-produced by Akshata Narain under the banner AM Television. It is the 4th highest grossing Assamese film.

== Cast ==
- Adil Hussain as Dr. Bezbaruah
- Zubeen Garg as DSP Mahadev Borbaruah
- Siddharth Nipon Goswami as Advocate Shantanu Choudhary
- Kingkini Goswami as Sneha
- Nipon Goswami as Pradip Duarah (cameo appearance)
- Madhurima Choudhury as Shantanu's mother
- Arun Hazarika as Shantanu's uncle.
- Gaurab Borah as Ranjan Goswami
- Priyanka Bora as Birina
- Jeanatte Bay as Shantanu's sister
- Papori Saikia
- Padmaraag Goswami as a famous journalist
- Rajiv Kro
- Ashim Baishya
- Bhaskar Tamuly
- Rimpi Das in a special appearance on "Phool Phool" song
- Uddipta Goswami

== Soundtrack ==
Dr. Bezbaruah 2

Soundtrack album by Zubeen Garg
- Released: 16 April 2022
- Recorded: 2020–2021
- Genre: Feature film soundtrack
- Label: Saregama
- Producer: Zubeen Garg

Zubeen Garg chronology
| Pratighaat (2019) | Dr. Bezbaruah 2 (2022) | The Slambook (2023) |

Singles from Dr. Bezbaruah 2

Original composer was Ramen Barua. Later a couple of new songs were composed by Zubeen Garg and Diganta Bharati as guest composer of the film.

Music were arranged by Zubeen Garg, Bhadra Kanta Das (BKD), Palash Surya Gogoi and Shekhar Jyoti Goswami.

Lyrics were penned by Brajen Barua, Eli Ahmed, Diganta Bharati and Rahul Gautam.

Track List
| No. | Title | Singer(s) | Length |
|---|---|---|---|
| 1. | "Jiliki Jilika" | Zubeen Garg, Synicah | 3:52 |
| 2. | "Ki Naam Di Maatim" | Zubeen Garg, Bhaswati Bharati | 4:37 |
| 3. | "Phool Phool" | Zubeen Garg, Zublee Baruah | 3:47 |
| 4. | "Moina Kun Bidhatai" | Zubeen Garg, Indrani Talukdar |
| 5. | "Dr. Bezbaruah (Title Track)" | Zublee Baruah |
