= Rajdweep =

Indian screenwriter, lyricist

- Born: 20 September 1986 (age 40); Dhing, Nagaon, Assam, India
- Education: MA Economics, MA Journalism
- Alma mater: Cotton College, Gauhati University
- Occupations: Screenwriter, playwright, lyricist, journalist
- Spouse: Meenakshi Neog
- Parent(s): Jiban Dey, Rina Dey
- Writing career
- Language: Assamese, Hindi, Bengali
- Notable awards: Winner at Cinestaan India's Storyteller's Script Contest (2018), Assam State Film Award for Best Lyricist (2017), Best Playwright of the year (2019)
- Website: www.rajdweep.com

Rajdweep is an Indian screenwriter, playwright, lyricist and journalist hails from Dhing, Nagaon, Assam. He has been awarded by Bollywood superstar Aamir Khan for his script 'Ishqlogy' at Cinestaan India's Storyteller's Script Contest in 2018. He is the first lyricist from Assam who writes Assamese songs in Bollywood film. He wrote the songs 'Jiri Jiri' for the film A Death In The Gunj and the bihu song for the film Jagga Jasoos. Again, he becomes the first screenwriter from Assam who signed a Bollywood film. He signed the film on 21 October 2019.

== Personal life and education ==
Rajdweep was born on 20 September 1986 in Nagaon, Assam. After doing graduation in Economics from Gauhati University, Rajdweep did Masters in Economics and then completed his master's degree in journalism.

== Career ==
After working in many Assamese films, albums and plays, Rajdweep made his Bollywood debut in the Konkona Sen Sharma directed film A Death in the Gunj (2016) as a lyricist. His song 'Jiri Jiri' was an Assamese song in the film. He has been credited for writing the first full-length Assamese song in any Bollywood film. After that, he again got the opportunity to write a song for Anurag Basu directed film Jagga Jasoos. He wrote the Bihu song 'Lahe Lahe' for this film. Before that, for MTV dewarist show, he penned the widely accepted song called 'Memories' with Papon and Nucleya. His Hindi songs are 'Pakhi Pakhi', 'Aao Kabhi Jo'. As a screenwriter, Rajdweep's first film was Khel-the Game (2015). His other film as screenplay writer Rum Vodka Whisky has been released across Assam. Rajdweep has written songs in many Assamese films and various albums, theatre plays. As the youngest playwright of Assam's unique mobile theatre industry, Rajdweep has written many full-length plays. Apart from these, Rajdweep has a career in professional journalism and he is working as senior sub-editor of a vernacular daily called 'Assamiya Khabar'. He was conferred with the 2018-19 'Best Play of the Year' award for his play, Bondookor Kobita by All Assam Sahitya Sanmilan.

== Awards and recognitions ==
- Awarded Assam State Film Award (Dr. Nirmalprabha Bordoloi Memorial Award) for Best Lyricist for the film Dooronir Nirola Poja (2017).
- Fourth award winner at India's Biggest Script Contest by Cinestaan (2018). Awarded by Bollywood Superster Aamir Khan on 26 November, at Novotel Hotel, Juhu, Mumbai. Aamir Khan, Rajkumar Hirani, Anjum Rajabali, Juhi Chaturvedi were the jury members of this mega contest with around 4000 contestants from different parts of India. Rajdweep's script 'Ishqlogy - Something greater than technology' won the fourth prize.
- India Today featured him as 'Young Leader'. The leading news magazine of India featured Rajdweep for his journey from unique Mobile theatre in Assam to Bollywood.
- Best Playwright Award for his play 'Bandookor Kobita' at Oikyotaan Award by Asom Sahitya Sanmilani Award (2019).
- Won the 'Best Popular Playwright of the Year' award by All Assam Cultural Unity Union for the play 'Bahadur' at Nebcus Award 2020. The play was written for Hengool Theatre for the season 2019–2020. The play 'Bahadur' was based on a beautiful triangle love story in the backdrop of a serious issue of human organ trafficking.
- Won the 'Best Play' award for the play 'Birikhor Birina' at the historic Nalbari Raas Mahotsav 2022. This play was written for Rajmukut Theatre for the season 2022-23. 'Birikhor Birina' becomes highest grosser play at Nalbari Raas Mahotsav till date.
- Won the 'Best Popular Playwright of the Year' at Nebcus National Awards for the play 'Birikhor Birina'.
- Awarded Assam State Film Award (Dr. Nirmalprabha Bordoloi Memorial Award) for Best Lyricist for the song 'Jibon Khupi Khupi' from the film Pratighaat (2019 film).
- Awarded with Best Music Director/Composer Award at Rengoni Music Awards 2023 for the title song of the play 'Brahmachari', sung by Zubeen Garg.

== Works in Assamese language ==
=== As screenwriter ===
==== Films ====
Film	Category	Year	Director	Credit
Khel-the Game	Feature Film	2015	Ashok Kumar Bishaya	Story-Screenplay-Dialogue Writer
Rum Vodka Whisky	Feature Film	2017	Prasanta Saikia	Story-Screenplay-Dialogue Writer
Grey	Short Film	2017	Jiny Mahalia	Screenplay-Dialogue Writer
Letters From Deuta	Short Film	2017	Arunjit Borah	Dialogue Writer
Pratighaat (2019 film)	Feature Film	2019	Achinta Shankar	Screenplay-Dialogue Writer
Midnight Song	Feature Film	2021	Arunjit Borah	Dialogue Writer
Dr. Bezbaruah 2	Feature Film	2023	Nipon Goswami	Story-Screenplay-Dialogue Writer
Adrishyya	Feature Film	2026	Samujjal Kashyap	Story-Screenplay-Dialogue Writer

=== Music ===
Year	Song	Album
2015	Akash Subo Khuju	Akash Subo Khuju

=== As a lyricist ===
==== Films ====
Year	Film	Songs	Composer	Singer(s)	Film Director
2014	Rowd	Pokhi Pokhi Mon Mur, Kinu Jadu Aji	Jatin Sharma	Papon, Rupjyoti, Shreya Phukan	Gautam Baruah
2014	Raag (film)	Akou Ebaar, Tup Tup Xore Endhaar	Avinash Baghel	Anindita Paul, Dikshu	Rajni Basumatary
2014	Shinyor	Bixakto Suma	Anurag Saikia	Neer Dipankar	Kankan Rajkhowa
2015	Ahetuk	Nonsense Hridoye	Poran Borkotoky	Kalpana Patowary	Bani Das
2017	Bahniman	Matal Hol Ei Rati, Kola Kola Endhare, Bahnimaan Title Track	Jatin Sharma	Zubeen Garg, Papon, Kalpana Patowary, Raaj J Konwar	Biswajeet Bora
2017	Dur	Dhora diya, Likhi likhi, Dhora Diya female version	Siddharth- Rahul	Neer Deepankar, Siddhartha, Ritrisha, Rupjyoti	Kankan Rajkhowa
2017	Local Kung Fu 2	Khelimeli Mon		Anisha Saikia	Kenny Basumatary
2017	Dooronir Nirola Poja	Khuje Khuje Jibon, Xur Herabo Khuje	Tony-Utkarsh	Papon	Dhruva Bordoloi
2017	Rum Vodka Whiskey	Morumoy	Tridib Basumatary	Tridib Basumatary	Prasant Saikia
2018	Nijanor Gaan	Neelate Luka Bhaku, Dure Dure Tumi, Natun Ejaak, Osina Batot	Jatin Sharma	Zubeen Garg, Mahalaxmi Iyer, Nahid Afrin, Rupjyoti Devi, Siddhartha, Afsana	Munna Ahmed
2018	Raktabeez	Raktabeez Title Track	Palash Surya Gogoi	Joshua Queh	Biswajeet Bora
2018	Raja Returns	Tumi Mor	Poran Borkotoky	Rohit Sonar	Kishor Das
2018	Suspended Inspector Boro	The Dustbin Song	Utkarsh		Kenny Basumatary
2019	Kokaideu Bindass	Gun Gun	Manas Robin	Neel Akash	Dhruva Bordoloi
2019	Rowd Hoi Aha Tumi	Rowd Hoi Aha Tumi title, Neelaburot, Mukhaar Aarot	Poran Borkotoky	Papon, Zubeen Garg, Pompi Gogoi	Topon Bordoloi
2019	Pratighaat (2019 film)	Bechera Ei Mon, Khupi Khupi	Rahul Devnath, Poran Borkotoky	Papon, Ananya Dutta	Achinta Shankar
2020	Rhino Express	Shamiyana, Jagi Jagi Thaka	Rahul Devnath	Papon, Sushmita, Dimpy Sonowal	Moni Sinha
2022	Dada Tumi Dusto Bor	Sila Hoi	Alaap Dudul	Neel Akash	Samir Buragohain

==== Assamese albums ====
Album	Singer	Composer	Songs
Notun Puhor (2017)	Papon	Papon	Notun Puhor, Bohu Baat
Maati (2014)	Zublee	Zublee	Maah Karein
Mor Lorali (2015)	Dikshu Sarma	Dikshu Sarma	Ojut Tora
Maati 2 (2018)	Zublee	Zublee	Sankar Guru Aamare, Ohori Hoiya, Tauling Porota
Emuthi Habiyax	Pompi Gogoi	Bibhuti Gogoi	Thakok Diya

==== Assamese TV series ====
Serial	Year	Songs	Composer	Singer(s)	TV Channel
Sabda		Title Track	Poran Borkotoky		Rang (TV channel)
Enekoiye Bhagene Xopun		Title Track	Dikshu Sarma		Jonack
Hello Boss		Title Track	Poran Borkotoky		Jonack
Mayabini Ratir Kolat		Title Track	Papon		Jonack
Nixabda		Title Track	Aniruddha Barua		Rang (TV channel)
Jibonor Collage	2021	Title Track	Rajdweep	Papon	NKtv
City Lights	2021	Title Track	Rajdweep	Zubeen Garg	NKtv
Aabir	2022	Title Track	Rajdweep	Simanta Sekhar	NKtv
Bindas Colony	2022	Title Track	Rajdweep	Dr. Sudip Ranjan Medhi	NKtv

=== As playwright ===
Year	Play	Theatre	Remarks
2014	Akow Edin	Hengul Theatre	Debut as a playwright. First Assamese Play on Amnesia.
2015	Boliya Krishna	Hengul Theatre	Known for breaking 30 years old record of Hengool Theatre.
2015	Juj	Hengul Theatre	(as editor)
2016	Breaking News	Kohinoor Theatre	First Assamese Play to use 3D Technology and based on Media & TRP.
2016	Bonoriya	Hengul Theatre	First Music Direction by Papon in Mobile Theatre.
2016	Bekar Bahubali	Hengul Theatre	
2016	Betal Police	Bhagyadevi Theatre	First Music Direction by Dikshu in Mobile Theatre
2017	Best of Luck	Kohinoor Theatre	
2017	Bindass	Chiranjiv Theatre	
2017	Boliya Droupadi	Hengul Theatre	
2018	Bandookor Kobita	Hengul Theatre	
2018	Bauli Mur Priya	Rajmukut Theatre	
2018	Beporuwa Prem	Kahinoor Theatre	
2018	Barnali Barua Premot Porise	Chiranjeev Theatre	
2018	Bapukon Zindabad	Sankardev Theatre	
2018	Bonxomorjyada	Sankardev Theatre	
2019	Bahadur	Hengul Theatre	Won the 'Best Popular Playwright of the Year' award by All Assam Cultural Unity Union.
2019	Birangana	Rajmukut Theatre	
2019	Boroxa Jetiya Name	Kohinoor Theatre	
2019	Baagh	Rajmukut Theatre	
2019	Bohag Jodi Naahe	Sankardev Theatre	
2021	Bukur Majot Tumi	Udayan Theatre	
2022	Birikhor Birina	Rajmukut Theatre	Won the 'Best Play' award at the historic Nalbari Raas Mahotsav 2022.
2022	Bokul Phulor Dore	Rajmukut Theatre	
2022	Buddhadev	Hengul Theatre	
2022	Bishnupriya	Kohinoor Theatre	
2022	Bohag	Brindaban Theatre	
2023	Brahmachari	Rajmukut Theatre	Rajdweep Won Best Music Director Award at Rengoni Music Award 2023 for this.
2023	Bel	Rajmukut Theatre	
2023	Bonroja	Hengool Theatre	The play was starring Ravi Sarma
2023	Bidaaybela	Brindaban Theatre	The play was based on a struggle of a acid victim.
2023	Bidrohir Prempotro	Theatre Bhagyadevi	It was a love triangle.
2023	Benami Priya	Abhinandan Theatre	The play was based on two lookalike sisters.

== Works in Bollywood and Hindi language ==
=== As lyricist ===
Year	Film	Songs	Composer	Singer(s)	Film Director
2016	A Death in the Gunj	Jiri Jiri Noi	Sagar Desai	Promila Pradhan	Kankana Sen Sharma
2017	Jagga Jasoos	Bihu Song	Pritam	Neer Deepankar	Anurag Basu
2018	III Smoking Barrels	Uttorbihin	Papon	Papon	Sanjib Dey

== Works in Bengali language ==
=== As lyricist ===
==== Albums ====
Songs	Singer	Composer	Album
Bhule Aamay	Dikshu	Palash Surjya Gogoi	Bhule Aamay (2016)

== Books & literary works by Rajdweep ==
Rajdweep had written his book titled 'Guwahati Dot Com' in the year 2010. It was a compilation of his popular column with the same title, which was published in Asomiya Khabar.

== Career in journalism ==
Rajdweep had started his career in the popular newspaper in Assamese language. He worked there as senior sub-editor.
