= Kamarkuchi N. C. =

Villages in Kamrup Metropolitan district

Kamarkuchi N.C.
- Village
- Map of Assam Kamarkuchi N.C. (India)
- Coordinates: 26.118°N 91.904°E
- Country: India
- State: Assam
- District: Kamrup Metro
- Region: Sonapur

Area
  - Total: 188.16 ha (465.0 acres)
- Elevation: 54 m (177 ft)

Population (2011)
  - Total: 246
  - Density: 131/km^{2} (339/sq mi)

Languages
  - Official: Assamese
- Time zone: UTC+5:30 (IST)
- Postal code: 782402
- STD Code: 03624
- Vehicle registration: AS-01

Kamarkuchi N.C. is a small census village near Sonapur of Guwahati city in Kamrup Metropolitan district of the Indian state of Assam. As per 2011 Census of India, Kamarkuchi N.C. village has population of 246 people of which 116 are males while 130 are females.

Kamarkuchi N.C. village is known for the singer Zubeen Garg's cremation place.
