= Pabitra Rabha =

Assamese actor

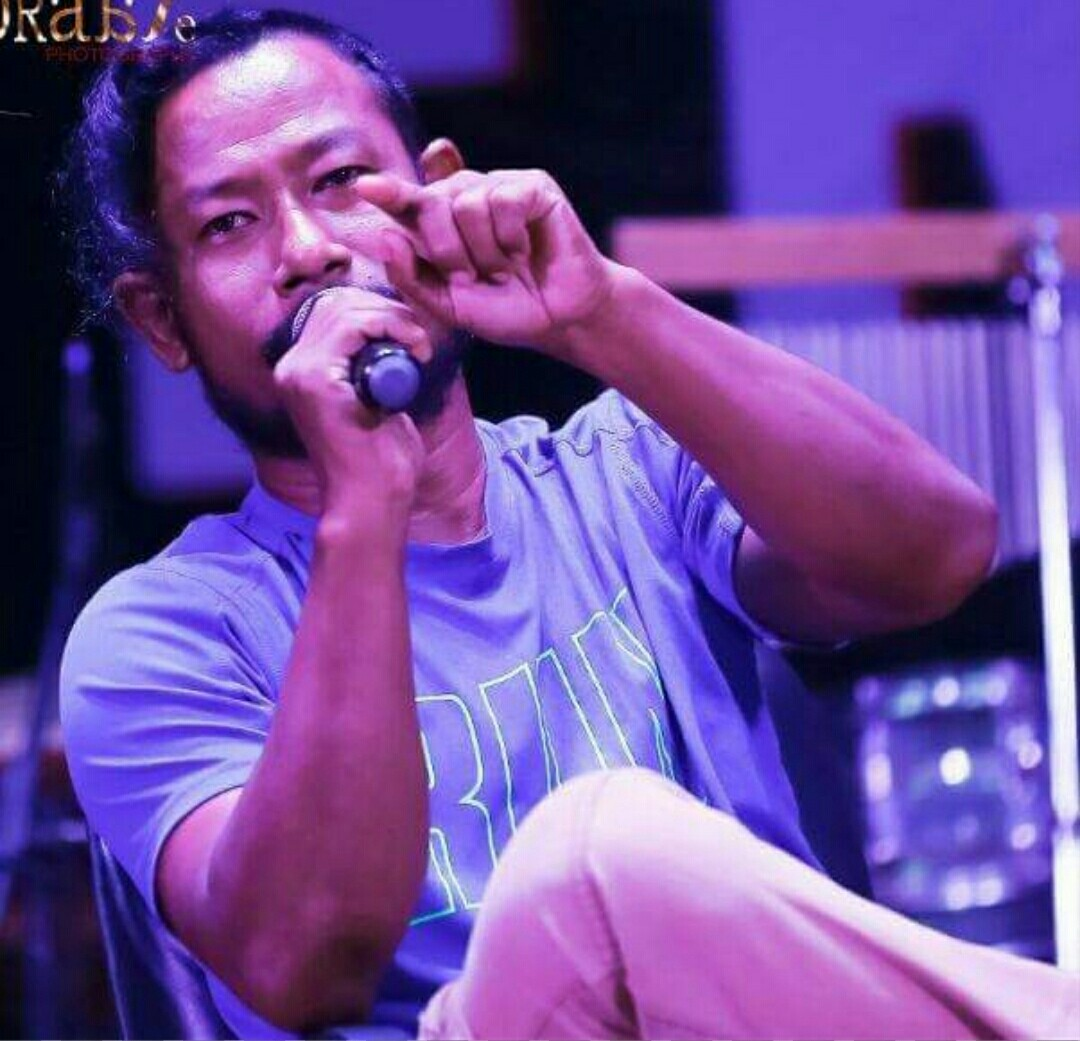
- Pabitra Rabha
- Born: 31 January 1976 (age 50); Tangla, Udalguri district, Assam, India
- Occupation: Actor
- Known for: Mission China; Kanchanjangha

Pabitra Rabha (born 31 January 1976) is an Indian actor, who works in Assamese, Hindi, Bangla and English language films.

== Early life ==
Pabitra Rabha was born on 31 January 1976 in Tangla, Udalguri district of Assam.

== Filmography ==
Year	Films	Role	Director	Language	Ref
2005	Tango Charlie	Bodo militant group deputy	Mani Shankar	Hindi	
2008	Mukhbiir		Mani Shankar	Hindi	
2013	Adhyai		Arup Manna	Assamese	
2014	Mary Kom	Asong	Omung Kumar	Hindi	
2017	Mission China	Lama	Zubeen Garg	Assamese	
2018	Alifa	Ranjan	Deep Choudhury	Bangla/Assamese	
2018	Bhavesh Joshi Superhero	Thapa	Vikramaditya Motwane	Hindi	
2018	The Underworld		Rajesh Jashpal	Assamese	
2019	One Little Finger	Abdul Hamid	Rupam Sarmah	English	
2019	Kanchanjangha	Pabitra	Zubeen Garg	Assamese	
2021	Bob Biswas	Dhonu	Diya Annapurna Ghosh	Hindi	

== Awards ==
- "Ustad Bismillah Khan Yuva Puraskar" (2011)
- "Pratima Baruah Pandey Award" (2020)
