= Pakeeza (album) =

Studio album by Zubeen Garg
- Released: April 11, 2013
- Recorded: 2008–2012
- Length: 36:00
- Language: Hindi
- Label: Times Music

Zubeen Garg chronology
Canvas (2012)	Pakeeza (2013)	Path (2014)
External audio
- Pakeeza – Official Audio Jukebox on YouTube

Zubeen Garg Hindi chronology
Zindagi (2007)	Pakeeza (2013)	Sufi Ishq (2017)

Singles from Pakeeza
- 1. "Pakeeza" Released: April 10, 2013

Pakeeza is a Hindi album by Zubeen Garg, released in 2013 with eight romantic songs under the banner of Times Music. The album was released at the Guwahati Medical College auditorium during the event of Prag Cine Awards in 2013.

== Track listing ==
No.	Title	Length
1.	"Pakeeza"	5:04
2.	"Piya"	4:17
3.	"I Can Live For You"	3:59
4.	"Kafur"	5:15
5.	"Kehkasha"	3:57
6.	"Piya More"	4:40
7.	"Chalte Chalo Re"	4:00
8.	"Rama Rama"	3:48
Total length:		36:00

Sample credits

- "Chalte Chalo Re" contains interpolation of "Botahe Botahe", sung and written by Zubeen Garg and Jonkey Borthakur.
- "Piya More" contains a sample of the Assamese song "Nupur Piya More" from his previous album Canvas.
