= Kanchanjangha =

2019 Indian Assamese film by Zubeen Garg

Kanchanjangha: Rise
- Official poster
- Directed by: Zubeen Garg
- Written by: Zubeen Garg
- Screenplay by: Zubeen Garg
- Story by: Zubeen Garg
- Produced by: Zubeen Garg; Garima Saikia Garg; Shyamantak Gautam
- Starring: Zubeen Garg; Pinky Sharma; Sasanka Samir; Dhritiman Phukan; Pabitra Rabha; Atanu Bhuyan
- Cinematography: Pankaj Ingti and Deepak Dey
- Edited by: Protim Khaound
- Music by: Zubeen Garg
- Production companies: Eye Creations; Zeal Creations
- Distributed by: Siddharth Goenka (Goenka Enterprises)
- Release date: 6 September 2019
- Running time: 100 Minutes
- Country: India
- Language: Assamese
- Budget: 2 crore
- Box office: est. ₹7 crore

Kanchanjangha: Rise is a 2019 Indian Assamese-language action drama film directed by Zubeen Garg, who co-produced it with Garima Saikia Garg and Shyamantak Gautam under the banner of "Eye Creation Productions" and "Zeal Creations". The film features Zubeen Garg in lead role and Pabitra Rabha, Pinky Sharma, Sasanka Samir in supporting roles. Zubeen Garg wrote the story and screenplay for the film.

== Cast ==
- Zubeen Garg as Anirban Bhattacharya
- Pinky Sharma as Panchana
- Sasanka Samir as Samir
- Pabitra Rabha as Pabitra
- Jerina Baruah as Antara, Anirban's sister
- Tridip Lahon
- Atanu Bhuyan as an Officer in Assam Public Service Commission
- Tanaya Nandi
- Runu Devi
- Rohan Gautam

== Box office ==
Kanchanjangha was released on 6 September in 69 theatres of Assam as well as in Hyderabad, Gujarat, Cochin and Chennai. It got an overall positive response from people. The film collected ₹40 lakh in its first day. With an overall gross collection of ₹7 crores in a five-week-run made it the highest grossing Assamese film in history, until Ratnakar released a month later, which broke its record. In the beginning of the fourth week, Kanchanjangha surpassed the record of Baahubali 2: The Conclusion, which was the highest grosser in the Northeast before this release. With this collection, it became the highest grossing Assamese film in history, exceeding the previous highest grosser, Mission China. It is currently the 5th highest grossing Assamese film.

== Soundtrack ==
The film contains 6 songs in its runtime. All of the songs were composed by Zubeen Garg and deemed very popular. The title song, Kanchanjangha, is a poem written by Jyotiprasad Agarwala, some parts of which have been sung as a song and others recited.

Kanchanjangha

Soundtrack album by Zubeen Garg
- Released: 20 June 2019
- Genre: Feature film soundtrack
- Length: 35:46
- Label: Times Music
- Producers: Zubeen Garg, Shyamantak Gautam

Zubeen Garg chronology
Ratnakar (2019)	Kanchanjangha (2019)	Pratighaat (2019)

Track List
No.	Title	Lyrics	Artist (s)	Length
1.	"Dhulikona"	Sasanka Samir	Zubeen Garg, Zublee Baruah, Panchana Rabha	06:26
2.	"Priti Bhora"	Sasanka Samir	Zubeen Garg, Gayatri Hazarika	04:53
3.	"Rikto Xikto"	Punam Nath	Zubeen Garg, Rahul Gautam Sharma, Gauranga	02:45
4.	"Panchana"	Traditional & Sasanka Samir	Zubeen Garg, Panchana Rabha	05:53
5.	"Kanchanjangha"	Jyotiprasad Agarwala	Zubeen Garg, Rahul Gautam Sharma, Aum S Varenyam	10:48
6.	"Priti Bhora-2"	Sasanka Samir	Zubeen Garg, Mansi	04:51
Total length:				35:36

== See also ==
- Ratnakar, a film by Jatin Bora
- Pratighat
