= Muwamari =

Country	India
State	Assam
District	Nagaon
Circle	Dhing
Population (2011)
Total	826
Language
Official	Assamese
Time zone	UTC+5:30 (IST)
Pin No	782123
Vehicle registration	AS02

Muwamari is a medium size village located in Dhing of Nagaon district, Assam, India with total 156 families residing. The Muwamari village has a population of 826 of which 428 are males while 398 are females as per Population Census 2011.

In Muwamari village, the population of children with age 0-6 is 180 which makes up 21.79% of total population of village. The average Sex Ratio of Muwamari village is 930 which is lower than Assam state average of 958. The Child Sex Ratio for the Muwamari as per census is 978, higher than the Assam average of 962.

Muwamari village has lower literacy rate compared to Assam. In 2011, the literacy rate of Muwamari village was 44.74% compared to 72.19% of Assam. In Muwamari Male literacy stands at 46.29% while female literacy rate was 43.04%.

As per constitution of India and Panchyati Raaj Act, Muwamari village is administrated by Sarpanch (Head of Village) who is elected representative of village.
