= Zindagi (album) =

Studio album by Zubeen Garg
- Released: 29 August 2007
- Length: 45:17
- Language: Hindi
- Label: Universal Music Group

Zubeen Garg chronology
Mukha (2006)	Zindagi (2007)	Antara (2007)

Zubeen Garg Hindi chronology
Nupur (2001)	Zindagi (2007)	Pakeeza (2013)

Singles from Zindagi
- 1. "Jia Re Jia Re" Released: August 27, 2007

Zindagi is a 2007 studio album sung by Zubeen Garg. It was released on 29 August 2007 by Universal Music India. The album also has co-singers, Shafqat Amanat Ali and Chithra lending their voices.

== Track listing ==
All songs were composed by Alaap Dudul Saikia.

No.	Title	Writer(s)	Singer(s)	Length
1.	"Zindagi Kahin Gum Hai"	Ravi Basnet	Zubeen Garg	5:00
2.	"Jia Re Jia Re"	Sunil Bhatia	Zubeen Garg	5:24
3.	"Tu Hi Tu Hai"	Ravi Basnet	Shafqat Amanat Ali	4:55
4.	"Pal Pal Bekal"	Sunil Bhatia	Chithra	4:09
5.	"Nazaren Karam Ho"	Shabir Ahmed	Zubeen Garg	4:17
6.	"Udte Parindon Ke"	Shabir Ahmed	Zubeen Garg	4:20
7.	"Shaam Dhal Jaye"	Ravi Basnet	Chithra	5:04
8.	"Jia Lage Na"	Shabir Ahmed	Zubeen Garg	4:38
9.	"Zindagi Kahin Gum Hai" (Remix)	Ravi Basnet	Zubeen Garg	5:10
10.	"Udte Parindon Ke" (Remix)	Shabir Ahmed	Zubeen Garg	3:40
Total length:				45:17
