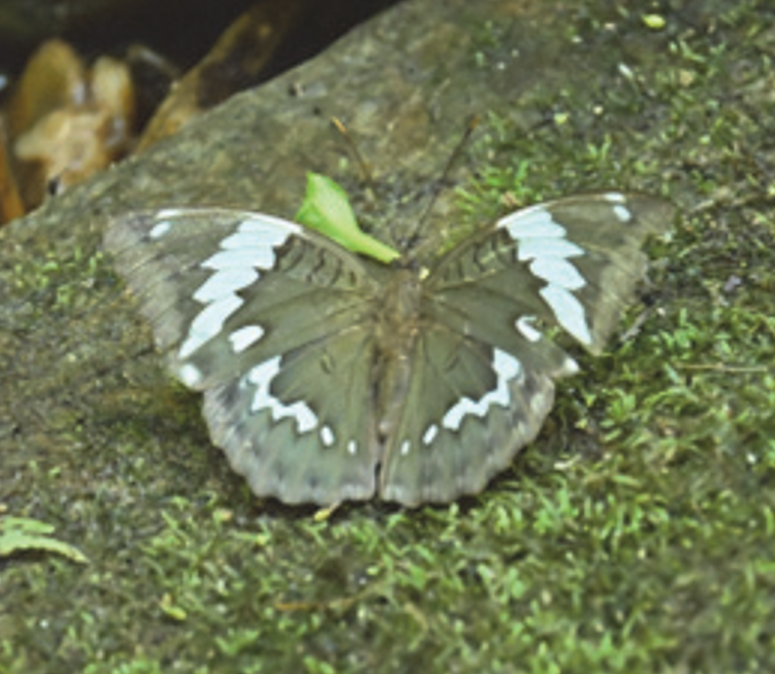

Scientific classification
- Kingdom: Animalia
- Phylum: Arthropoda
- Clade: Pancrustacea
- Class: Insecta
- Order: Lepidoptera
- Family: Nymphalidae
- Genus: Euthalia
- Species: E. zubeengargi

Binomial name
- Euthalia zubeengargi Upadhaya & Sadasivan, 2026

= Euthalia zubeengargi =

Species of butterfly

Euthalia zubeengargi, the Basar duke, is a species of butterfly in the family Nymphalidae, subfamily Limenitidinae. It was discovered by Roshan Upadhaya and Kalesh Sadasivan in the eastern Himalayan region of Arunachal Pradesh. The species is named in honor of Assamese singer and cultural icon Zubeen Garg.

== Taxonomy ==
Euthalia zubeengargi belongs to the genus Euthalia, a group of butterflies commonly known as barons, distributed across the Indomalayan realm. The genus is part of the tribe Adoliadini within the subfamily Limenitidinae. This species is the 25^{th} species of Euthalia recorded from India.

== Etymology ==
The species is named after Assamese singer Zubeen Garg in recognition of his contributions to regional culture and identity.

== Description ==
The eyes of this species are without hairs, and the eyespots are black in colour. The thorax and the abdomen are brownish in colour.

The upperside is a deep orange-brown color with a row of spots on the forewing and a thinner bluish-white row of spots on the hindwing, with an additional heart-shaped spot and tornal spot in space 1.

The underside is similar to the upperside, except the ground colour is lighter and the markings are dotted with black.

This species can be differentiated from the other species of the Subtype A2 of the genus Euthalia by the combination of the forewing and associated hindwing elements.

The female of this species is undescribed.

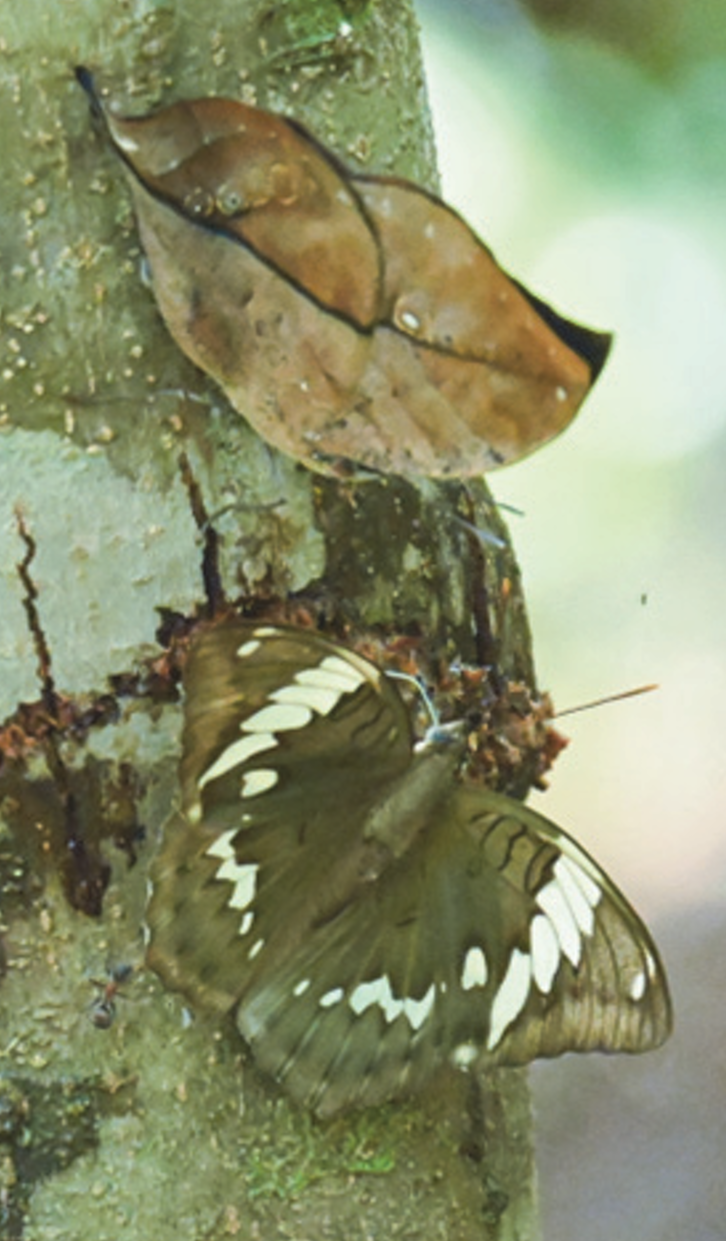
Sap sucking with Kallima inachus

== Distribution and habitat ==
The species is currently known only from two localities in the Basar region of Lepa Rada district in Arunachal Pradesh, India, and appears to be localised.

Only one male of this species has been collected, and is known only from two males despite intensive surveys.

It inhabits semi-evergreen forests at elevations of approximately 600–750 metres, preferring cool, shaded understories.

== Behaviour and ecology ==
Larval host plants and early stages remain unknown, though it is likely associated with broad-leaved canopy or subcanopy trees characteristic of Eastern Himalayan evergreen forests.

The individuals of this species were active from late morning to early afternoon, making short and slow flights between nearby foliage. All sightings were made in dense, moist understories with persistent canopy shade, suggesting a preference for cool, humid microhabitats.

This species has been recorded feeding on sap from trees, sometimes along with other butterfly species.

== See also ==
- Euthalia aconthea
- Biodiversity of Arunachal Pradesh
- List of butterflies of India
- Euthalia malaccana
