= Pratighaat (2019 film) =

2019 film

- Directed by: Achinta Shankar
- Screenplay by: Rajdweep
- Produced by: Narendra N Sinha; Nalini Roy Gayari
- Starring: Amrita Gogoi; Diganta Hazarika; Aimee Baruah; Ashramika Saikia
- Edited by: Protim Khaound
- Music by: Zubeen Garg; Rahul Dev Nath; Diganta Bharati; Poran Borkotoky
- Production company: Issue Production
- Distributed by: Narman Studio Works
- Release date: 6 December 2019
- Country: India
- Language: Assamese

Pratighaat is an Indian Assamese language action drama and romance film directed by Achinta Shankar, written by Rajdweep and produced by Narendra N Sinha and Nalini Roy Gayari. The film has been released under the banner of Issue Production and distributed by Norman Studio Works. The film features Amrita Gogoi and Diganta Hazarika in lead roles while Ashramika Saikia as child artist. It was released on 6 December 2019

== Cast ==
The cast include the following actors in the film

- Zubeen Garg (special appearance in the song "Pratighaat")
- Diganta Hazarika
- Amrita Gogoi
- Aimee Baruah
- Hiranya Deka
- Bishnu Kharghoria
- Padmarag Goswami
- Ashramika Saikia
- Achintya Sharma

== Soundtrack ==
The songs are composed by Zubeen Garg, Rahul Dav Nath, Diganta Bharati and Poran Borkotoky respectively.

Pratighaat

Soundtrack album by Zubeen Garg, Rahul Dev Nath, Diganta Bharati, Poran Borkotoky
- Released: 21 November 2019
- Recorded: 2019
- Genre: Feature film soundtrack
- Label: Times Music
- Producer: Zubeen Garg

Zubeen Garg chronology
Kanchanjangha (2019)	Pratighaat (2019)	Dr. Bezbaruah 2 (2022)

Track List
No.	Title	Lyrics	Singer(s)	Length
1.	"Pratighaat"	Sasanka Samir	Zubeen Garg	4:06
2.	"Bechera Ei Mon"	Rajdweep	Papon	3:54
3.	"Junakore Boroxun"	Diganta Bharati	Dikshu Sarma, Bhaswati Bharati	4:22
4.	"Jibon Khupi Khupi"	Rajdweep	Ananya Dutta	3:39
