= Times Music =

Indian music record label company

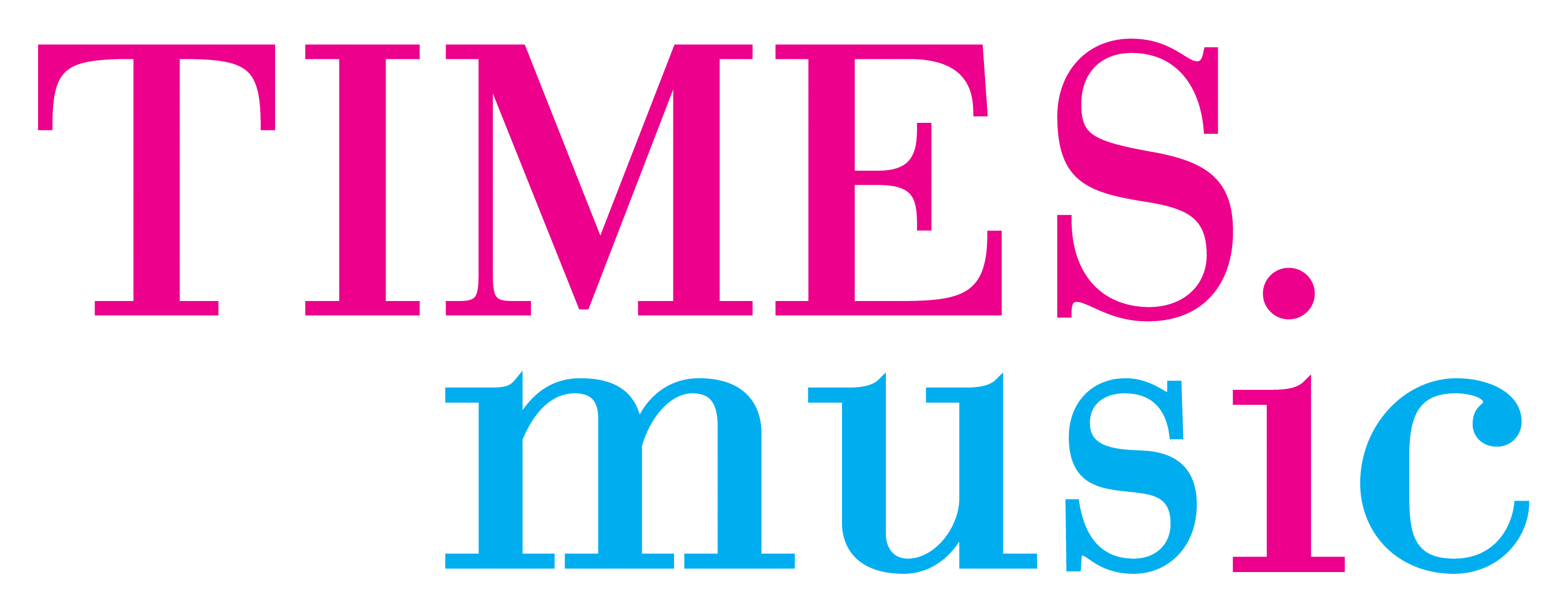
- Type: Public
- Industry: Music & entertainment
- Founded: February 1998; 28 years ago
- Headquarters: The Times of India Building, Mumbai, Maharashtra, India
- Area served: Worldwide
- Key people: Mandar Thakur (CEO)
- Services: Music record label
- Subsidiaries: Speed Records

YouTube information
- Channel: Times Music
- Years active: 2010–present
- Genres: Music videos; Film trailers
- Subscribers: 12 million
- Views: 4 billion
- Last updated: 28 August 2023
- Website: timesmusic.com

Times Music is an Indian music record label copyright music publishing company, owned by The Times Group, headquartered in Mumbai, India. Times Music started operations in 1998 and has a catalogue of more than 48,000 tracks in all languages and genres. Times Music is also the Indian sub-publisher for global music publishing firms Warner/Chappell Music, Peermusic, Wixen Music, CTM Publishing and Cloud 9 Music Publishing.

Times Music was one of the early pioneers of remixes in India and was an early leader in the devotional and spiritual music genre. The label has also published regional, folk, Hindi and traditional albums in languages such as Telugu, Punjabi, Bengali, Gujarati, Assamese and Kannada and has a strong regional presence.

== History ==
Times Music was established in 1998 under the leadership of Arun Arora, who was then the President and Executive Director of The Times of India and Times Global Broadcasting Co. Ltd. Tu Hi Tu was the first album released by Times Music. This was succeeded by Jalwa: Dance Hungama (Remix album), Dehajaan (Assamese album), Dil Le Gayee and Jadoo (Remix album). In 2000, the Indian music industry was ruled by Bollywood and international music. The intent of the label was to create albums tailored to appeal to the discerning audience, which resulted in Times Music's concepts of spiritual, world, and remix music in India.

In 2009 Times Music became the first music company in India to introduce a Brainwave Sound Technology album called Bhakti Band. This was a fusion devotional/spiritual album. The album was composed by Vaibhav Saxena.

== Albums ==
This is the incomplete list

Year	Album(s)	Artist(s)
1990s
1998	Tu Hi Tu	Sanjay Maroo
1998	Jalwa - Dance Hungama	Various Artists
1998	Dehajaan	Kumar Bhabesh
1999	Dil Le Gayee	Jasbir Jassi
1999	Us Rah Par	Junaid Jamshed
1999	Jadoo	Zubeen Garg, DJ Akbar Sami, Swastika, Jojo
1999	Josh: The Wilds Withins	Abbey, Swastika, Sagarika, Jojo, Zubeen Garg, Sanjay Maroo
1999	Gayatri	Various Artists
1999	Sur	Preeti Uttam
2000s
2000	Kandisa	Indian Ocean
2000	Hunpahi	Kumar Bhabesh
2000	Jalwa 2	Various Artists
2000	Jatra Shuru	Bhoomi
2001	Nahor	Zubeen Garg, Santa Uzir, Gitimoni, Bornali
2001	Dil Ki Baat	Junaid Jamshed
2001	Raahein	Shom Shukla
2001	Udaan	Bhoomi
2002	Viva!	Viva
2002	Maroo	Sanjay Maroo
2003	Aasma	Aasma
2003	Viva Reloaded	Viva
2004	Because I Can	Katy Rose
2004	Jonaki Raati	Angaraag Mahanta
2005	Aasma: The Infinite	Aasma
2007	Prithibir Rong	Alaap Dudul Saikia, Debojit Saha, Sneha Pant, Javed Ali
2008	Mon Haralo	Various Artists
2008	Sinaaki Osinaaki	Papon
2010s
2012	Suma	Nayan Nilim
2012	Rock	Zubeen Garg
2013	Mor Loralir	Dikshu
2013	Pakeeza	Zubeen Garg
2014	Path	Zubeen Garg
2014	Kun Tumi	Various Artists
2016	Nahor 2016	Zubeen Garg

== Junglee Music ==
In 2007, Times Music launched its independent film music label, Junglee Music, to capitalise on the popularity of commercial film music. Junglee Music started with Welcome and followed it up with titles like Singh Is Kinng, Horn 'Ok' Pleassss, Dasvidaniya, Pink, Dhanak, Begum Jaan and Romeo Akbar Walter as well as other language film titles. Later Junglee Music also published music for Raja Natwarlal and Haider.

=== Hindi films ===
Year	Film
2000s
2004	Krishna Cottage
2004	Netaji Subhas Chandra Bose: The Forgotten Hero
2005	Yahaan
2005	Hanuman
2007	Welcome
2008	Singh Is Kinng
2008	Dasvidaniya
2010s
2013	Saheb, Biwi Aur Gangster Returns
2014	Haider
2014	Raja Natwarlal
2014	Ankhon Dekhi
2016	Dhanak
2016	Pink
2017	Begum Jaan
2017	Running Shaadi
2017	Sachin: A Billion Dreams
2017	Irada
2018	Baazaar
2019	Romeo Akbar Walter
2020s
2023	Chatrapathi
2023	Bloody Daddy
2026	Welcome to the Jungle
2026	Hanuman Ansh

=== Telugu films ===
Year	Film
2010s
2013	Adda
2013	Gunde Jaari Gallanthayyinde
2013	Doosukeltha
2013	Balupu
2014	Current Theega
2014	Ulavucharu Biriyani
2014	Run Raja Run
2014	Power
2014	Rough
2015	Sher
2015	Kick 2
2015	Nannaku Prematho
2015	Bengal Tiger
2015	Jil
2016	Oopiri
2016	Janaki Ramudu
2017	Radha
2017	Intlo Deyyam Nakem Bhayam
2017	Jaya Janaki Nayaka
2017	Nene Raju Nene Mantri
2020s
2023	Ugram
2023	Custody

=== Tamil films ===
Year	Film
2000s
2008	Kadhalil Vizhunthen
2008	Saroja
2010s
2010	Maanja Velu
2010	Mynaa
2012	Aravaan
2012	Thaandavam
2013	Veeram
2013	Jannal Oram
2014	Veeram
2014	Bramman
2014	Un Samayal Arayil
2014	Vanavarayan Vallavarayan
2014	Kathai Thiraikathai Vasanam Iyakkam
2016	Hello Naan Pei Pesuren
2016	Geethaiyin Raadhai
2017	Hara Hara Mahadevaki
2017	Ivan Thanthiran
2017	Palli Paruvathile
2018	Seethakaathi
2019	Dev
2019	Kaaviyyan
2020s
2023	Custody
2023	Iraivan
2025	Madharaasi

=== Kannada films ===
Year	Film
2010s
2012	Nana Life Alli
2014	Oggarane
2014	Abhimanyu
2015	Mast Mohabbat
2015	Uppi 2
2017	Srikanta
2017	Life 360
2017	Women's Day
2018	Hottegagi Genu Battegagi

=== Bengali films ===
Year	Film
2000s
2008	Mon Amour: Shesher Kobita Revisited
2010s
2011	Icche
2012	Muktodhara
2014	Aamar Ami
2015	Bela Seshe
2015	Naxal
2015	Jomer Raja Dilo Bor
2015	Abby Sen
2015	Natoker Moto - Like a Play
2016	Beparoyaa
2020s
2022	Belashuru
2022	Haami 2
2023	Fatafati
2023	Raktabeej
2024	Sentimentaaal
2024	Dabaru
2024	Bohurupi
2025	Balaram Kando
2025	Shreeman v/s Shreemati
2025	Amar Boss
2025	Raktabeej 2

=== Assamese films ===
Year	Film
2010s
2010	Aabeli
2012	Rowd
2012	Durjon
2013	Tumi Jodi Kuwa
2013	Shinyor
2014	Rodor Sithi
2015	Ahetuk
2016	Bahnimaan
2016	Gaane Ki Aane
2017	Dur
2017	Dooronir Nirola Poja
2017	Mission China
2018	The Underworld
2019	Kanchanjangha
2019	Pratighaat
2020s
2022	Bandhu
2024	Abhimanyu
2025	Joddha: The Warrior of Life
2026	Mahabahu: The Brahmaputra

=== Punjabi films ===
Year	Film(s)
2020s
2021	Moosa Jatt

=== Punjabi non-films ===
Year	Artist	Song name
2010s
2010	G Deep	"O Billo"
2015	Navv Inder	"Wakhra Swag"
2016	Teesha Nigam	"Katna Nai"
2016	Big Dhillon	"Hauli Hauli"
2016	A Baaz	"Sharabi"
2016	Roshan Prince	"Jatti De Nain"
2017	T-Jay and Mellow D	"Xplain"
2017	Navv Inder	"Tu mere ki Lagdi"

=== Pakistani films ===
Year	Film
2010s
2018	Teefa in Trouble

== Electronic dance music ==
Times Music started importing and licensing electronic dance music releases in India in 2006. The label signed license deals with EDM labels such as Black Hole Recordings, Anjunabeats, Hommegga & Toco Asia. Times Music also released albums by artists such as Tiësto, Paul van Dyk, ATB, Above & Beyond and Skazi.

== Independent music ==
Times Music has been associated with independent (indie) music since the late 1990s and early 2000s. It was one of the first publishers of indie music in India, even before the term was coined by the music industry. Times Music has worked with iconic bands such as Indian Ocean, MIDIval Punditz, Mrigya, Viva and Band of Boys. Other prominent artists are Zubeen Garg, Karsh Kale, Susheela Raman, Angaraag Mahanta and Kumar Bhabesh.

== Times Living ==
Times Living was earlier known as Times Wellness, a division of Times Music, which was established in 2006. Times Living features products that include yoga, spirituality, diet and nutrition and modern forms of physical fitness. The record label has also released DVDs and albums by spiritual groups like Art of Living Foundation, Brahma Kumaris and Isha Foundation.

== Genre-based mobile apps ==
Times Music was the first record label to launch music apps for mobiles that were specific for particular genres. The label has apps that support Android and iOS devices. Times Music has a collection of music apps varying from devotional, classical to Bollywood. Recently, Sunny Leone and Mickey Mehta came out with a fitness app and the DVD Super Hot Sunny Mornings for women of all age groups.

== Awards and achievements ==
- Best New Age Album Trophy at 57th Grammy Awards to Ricky Kej for Winds of Samsara
- Best background score trophy at the Mirchi Music Awards 2015 to Vishal Bhardwaj for Haider
- Best background score trophy to Vishal Bharadwaj at GIMA 2015 for Haider
- Best rock album trophy at GIMA 2015 to Mihir Joshi Band for Mumbai Blues
- National Award 2015 for best music director to Vishal Bhardwaj for Haider
- National Award 2015 for best singer to Sukhwinder Singh for Haider
- Times Music albums won three slots on iTunes' "Best of 2014" list:
  - Best Album: Haider
  - Best IndiPop Album: Indian Ocean's Tandanu
  - Devotional Spiritual Superlikes
- Ananthaal selected as Apple's "Best Indian Pop Album" of 2015
- Ananthaal won the Best Video award for the song "Inayat" at the Radio City Freedom Awards 2016
- Indian Ocean won the Jury's Choice award for Best Fusion Artiste at the 2016 Radio City Freedom Awards
