= Assamese cinema =

Film industry of the Indian state

- No. of screens: Approx. 130 in the state of Assam
- Main distributors: ASFFDC; AM Television; Dolphin Films Pvt. Ltd

Produced feature films (2022)
- Total: 34 (Theatrical)

Gross box office (2025)
- Total: ₹100 crore (US$11 million)

Assamese cinema, also known as Jollywood, is the Indian film industry of Assamese language. It is based in Assam, Northeast India. The industry was born in 1935 when Jyoti Prasad Agarwala released his movie Joymoti. Since then the Assamese cinema has developed a slow-paced, sensitive style. In the beginning the industry was called Jollywood, for Agarwala's Jyoti Chitraban Film Studio.

Despite its long history and its artistic successes, for a state that has always taken its cinema seriously, Assamese cinema has never really managed to break through on the national scene despite its film industry making a mark in the National Awards over the years. Although the beginning of the 21st century has seen Hollywood-style and Bollywood-style Assamese movies hitting the screen, the industry has not been able to compete in the market, significantly overshadowed by the larger industries such as Hollywood and Bollywood. In 2017, Village Rockstars was selected as India's official entry to the 91st Academy Awards. In 2019, Bulbul Can Sing won the Special Mention at Berlin International Film Festival. In 2025, the film Roi Roi Binale became the highest-grossing Assamese film of all time, breaking previous box-office records. (Note: NDTV | TV9 Bharatvarsh)

== History ==
=== 1930s ===
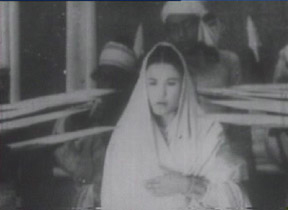
The first Assamese picture, Joymati (1935)

The origins of Assamese cinema can be traced back to Rupkonwar Jyotiprasad Agarwala, who was also a noted poet, playwright, composer and freedom fighter. He was instrumental in the production of the first Assamese Film Joymati in 1935, under the banner of Chitralekha Movietone. Aideu Handique was the heroine of this movie. Due to the lack of trained technicians, Jyotiprasad, while making his maiden film, shouldered the added responsibilities as the scriptwriter, producer, director, choreographer, editor, set and costume designer, lyricist, and music director. The film, completed with a budget of 60,000 rupees was released on 10 March 1935. The picture failed. Like so many early Indian films, the negatives and complete prints of Joymati are missing. Hridaynath Agarwala restored a few reels of the film, and he donated them to the government of Assam. Altaf Mazid subtitled whatever was left of the prints, added narration to it, and killed the film's background music. Critic Bitopan Borbora protested that devastating act. Despite the significant financial loss from Joymati, the second picture Indramalati was filmed between 1937 and 1938 finally released in 1939. Pramathesh Barua released his Assamese version of Devdas in 1937. It was the last of the 3 language version following Bengali and Hindi.

=== 1940s ===
Agarwala made another film after a gap of two years, titled Indramalati. It was his second and last film. The eminent composer and singer of Assam, Bhupen Hazarika, played a prominent role in the film. With the death of Jyotiprasad, the Assamese film industry witnessed a temporary lull for a couple of years.

However, things changed with the onset of World War II. Taking advantage of the situation, Rohini Kr. Baruah made a film on a relevant historical theme titled Manomati (1941). This was followed by films such as Parvati Prasad Baruwa’s Rupahi (1946), Kamal Narayan Choudhury’s Badan Barphukan (1947), Phani Sarma’s Siraj, Asit Sen’s Biplabi, Prabin Phukan’s Parghat, and Suresh Goswami’s Runumi.

=== 1950s ===
In the 1950s, Piyoli Phukan won a National Award. The film was produced by Gama Prasad Agarwalla under the banner of Rup Jyoti Productions. It was directed by Phani Sharma, with music composed by Bhupen Hazarika. The story depicted the life of freedom fighter Piyoli Phukan, who revolted against British rule and was executed for treason. The film was considered technically advanced for its time.

In 1955, a new talent, Nip Barua, made his directorial debut with Smrit Paras. His subsequent films Mak Aaru Moram and Ranga Police won several state awards and silver medals at the national level. Bhupen Hazarika also produced and directed his first film, Era Bator Sur.

Prabhat Mukherjee made Puberun (1959), a film on the universality of motherhood, which was screened at the Berlin Film Festival.

=== 1960s ===
Another notable film of the decade was Lachit Borphukan, directed by Sarbeswar Chakraborty. Bhupen Hazarika later made his musical Shakuntala (1961), which received critical acclaim and won the President’s Silver Medal.

Soon after, films began to be produced regularly. Notable works included Nip Barua’s Narakasur, Anil Choudhury’s Matri Swarga, Brojen Barua’s Itu Situ Bahuto, and Mukta and Anwar Hussain’s Tejimala.

By the mid-1960s, film production in Assam became more consistent. Between 1935 and 1970, a total of 62 Assamese films were produced. Filmmakers active during this period included Pravin Sharma, Saila Barua, Amar Pathak, Indukalpa Hazarika, Brajen Barua, Dibon Barua, Debkumar Basu, Amulya Manna, Gauri Barman, Atul Bardoloi, Sujit Singha, Nalin Duara, and Prafulla Barua.

=== 1970s ===
During the period from 1970 to 1982, a total of 57 Assamese films were made. New directors began to emerge. Notable films include Samarendra Narayan Dev’s Aranya (1970), Kamal Choudhury’s Bhaity (1972, the first colour film of Assam), Manoranjan Sur’s Uttaran (1973), Prabin Bora’s Parinam (1974), Deuti Barua’s Bristi (1974), Pulok Gogoi’s Khoj (1974), Padum Barua’s Gonga Silonir Pakhi (1976), Bhabendranath Saikia’s Sandhya Raag (1977), and Atul Bordoloi’s Kollol (1978).

=== 1980s ===
During the 1980s, the Assamese film industry experienced a slight period of decline, marked by reduced audience attendance, weak box-office performance, and an acute shortage of investment. As confidence among producers, distributors, and financiers diminished, film production slowed, and the industry’s economic presence within the state weakened. By the middle of the decade, Assamese cinema faced structural challenges that raised concerns about its long-term sustainability. In response to these conditions, a few pioneering film financiers and producers undertook efforts to stabilise and revitalise the industry by bearing significant financial risk through investment in feature films during this volatile period.

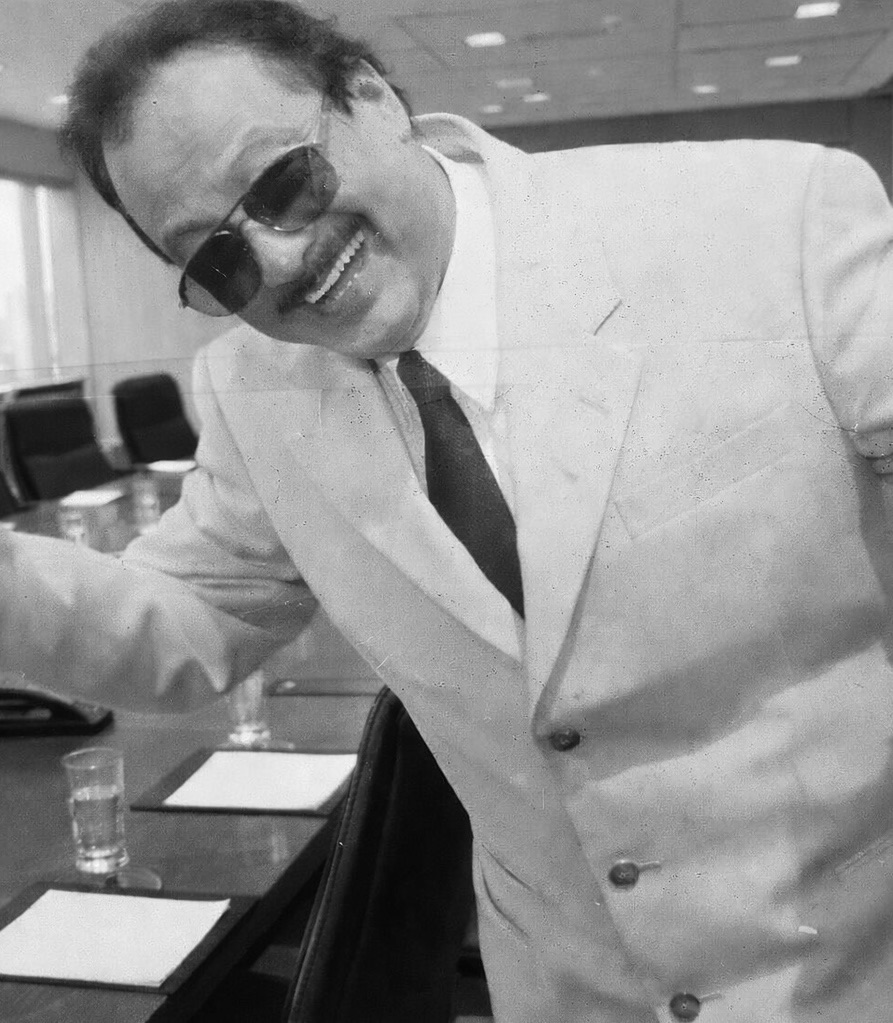
Paran Barbarooah (1939-2025), industrialist and film producer.

This movement was started in the mid 1980s by film producer Paran Barbarooah, a thriving industrialist who invested large sums of capital in the Assamese film industry. He financed feature film productions, assuming the full financial risk of these investments during unstable circumstances. The first feature film Barbarooah produced was Surooj, which is commonly regarded as the first big-budget Assamese film. Barbarooah allocated substantially greater funds to areas such as cinematography, sound, and overall technical execution, distinguishing it from most earlier releases. The film starring Brajen Bora, Abdul Majid, Pranjal Saikia, Dinesh Das, and Baharul Islam (who was launched in this film) achieved record-setting economic success and attracted significant public attention. It shattered all previous records and became the highest-grossing Assamese film by a large margin.

Contemporary media reports documented a massive crowd on the film’s opening day outside Anuradha Cinema Hall, where the anticipatory audience reportedly shattered the glass entrance to enter the hall.

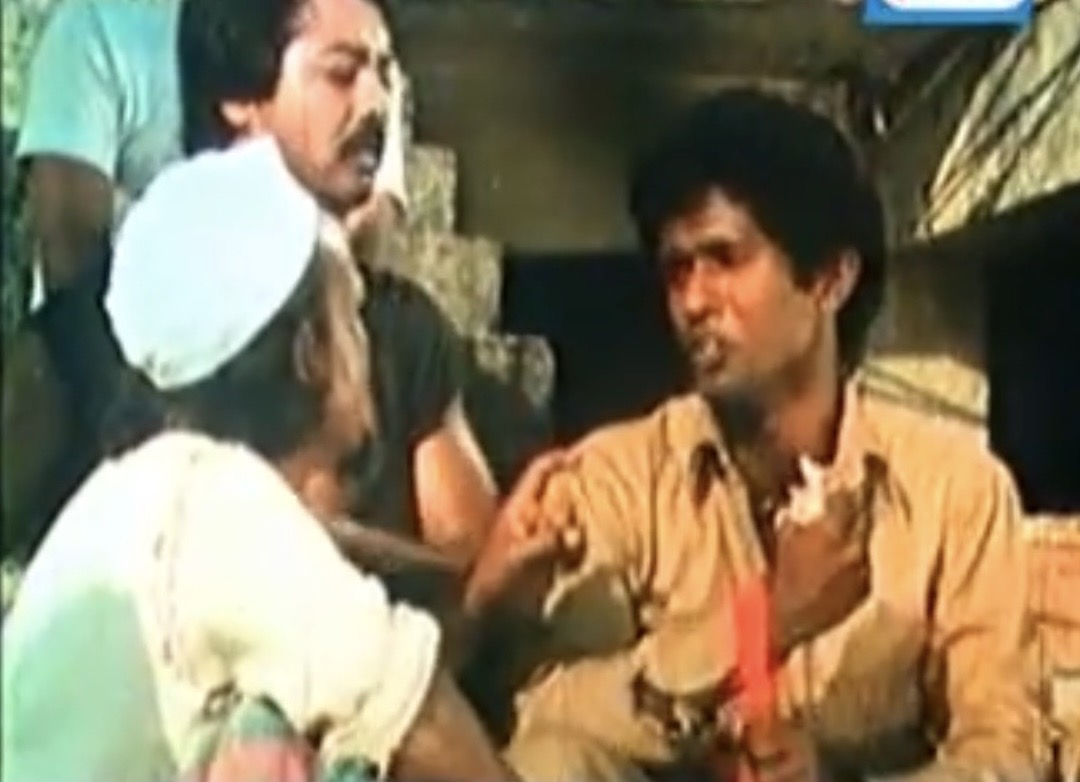
A still from the movie 'Surooj' (1985) with actors Pranjal Saikia and Baharul Islam.

Paran Barbarooah’s leap of faith with Surooj has often been interpreted as the defining moment which started the gradual shift in production strategy, with increased emphasis on higher budgets, improved technical standards, and broader audience reach. Alongside Barbarooah, other producers—Amulya Kakati, R.B. Mehta, and Dharmakanta Saikia—were also active during this phase, collectively participating in efforts to address the economic and institutional challenges facing Assamese filmmaking in the late 1980s.

=== 1990s ===
The year 1990 marked a transition period in Assamese cinema. Filmmakers experimented with new themes, stronger realism and socially conscious storytelling. Several notable films were released, representing both established directors and emerging voices of the 1990s era.

Film	Director	Cast	Notes	Ref.
Firingoti	Jahnu Barua	Moloya Goswami, Biju Phukan	Critically acclaimed social drama; Moloya Goswami won the National Film Award for Best Actress.	
Xanta Xista Hrista Pusta Mahadusta	Pulak Gogoi	Jayanta Bhagawati, Chetana Das	Popular comedy film of the early 1990s.	
Bhai Bhai	Dara Ahmed	Biju Phukan, Nipon Goswami	A family drama that achieved moderate commercial success.	
Bonani (re-release)	Jahnu Barua	Biju Phukan, Moloya Goswami	Re-released in 1990 in several theatres due to its popularity and critical acclaim.	—

=== 2000s ===
The 2000s saw the rise of multiple notable directors - Bhaskar Hazarika (who directed Kothanodi and Aamis), Prerana Barbarooah (who directed Spirit of The Graceful Lineage, Tumi Aahibaane, Echoes of Sunshine, etc), Deep Choudhury (who directed Alifa and Fishing Samurai), Monjul Baruah (who directed Anur: Eyes on the Sunshine, Kaaneen, etc), etc.

=== 2010s ===
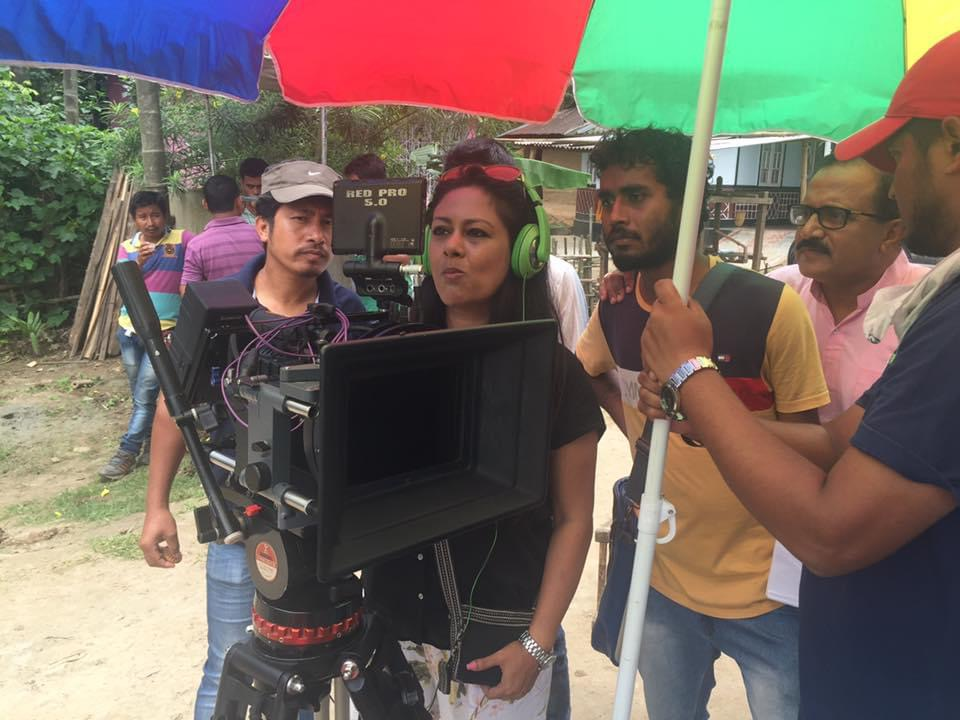
Director Prerana Barbarooah with Jyoti Bhuyan and Pradip Daimary on the sets of Tumi Aahibaane, 2016

The 2010s saw the release of four Assamese blockbusters- Mission China directed by Zubeen Garg which earned nearly ₹60,000,000/- (Six Crores) in the box office, Tumi Aahibane directed by National Award Winner Prerana Barbarooah which earned nearly ₹20,000,000/- (Two Crores) in the box office, Raamdhenu directed by National Award Winner Munin Barua which earned nearly ₹20,000,000/- (Two Crores) in the box office and Priyaar Priyo directed by National Award Winner Munin Barua which earned nearly ₹20,000,000/- (Two Crores) in the box office.

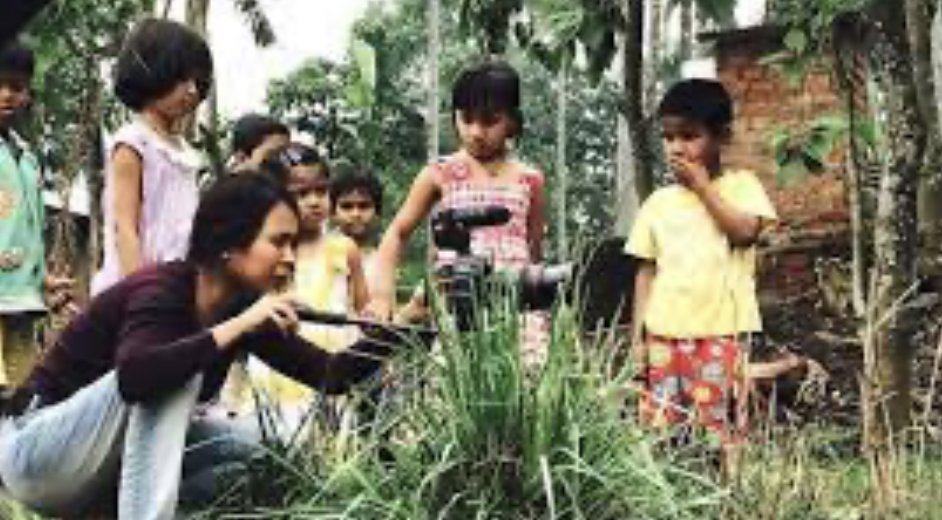
Rima Das shooting for Village Rockstars

Assamese feature films certified and released in 2010s
Year	Certified	Released
2010	4	3
2011	7	6
2012	11	10
2013	15	14
2014	21	18
2015	19	9
2016	20	17
2017	16	24
2018	18	22
2019	26	14
2020	19	—
2021	24	—
2022	34	—
2023	33	—
2024	18	_
2025	12	11

The 2010s also saw the rise of young independent voices in Assamese cinema, with unique films such as Local Kung Fu (Kenny Basumatary),Village Rockstars and Bulbul Can Sing (Rima Das) garnering accolades both nationally and internationally. Also was released the underground cult short film Muktir Mohakabyo.

The 2010s also saw the loss of many prominent personalities like director Munin Baruah, actor Biju Phukan, musician Bhupen Hazarika, who have played an important role in shaping Assamese cinema.

==== 2018 ====
In 2018, Village Rockstars won the Best Feature Film 'Swarna Kamal' award at the 65th National Film Awards in Delhi, hence becoming the second Assamese film after Halodhia Choraye Baodhan Khai to win this award. The film also won awards in the categories of Best Child Artist, Best Audiography and Best Editing. The film is also selected for India's official entry to 91st Academy Awards making it the first film from Assam to do this.

On 28 July 2018, another Assamese film Xhoixobote Dhemalite received three awards for Best Film, Best Actress and Best Music in 3rd Love International Film Festival in Los Angeles, US. The film also got 8 nominations. It also became the first Assamese film to release in the US.

==== 2019 ====
In 2019, two commercial hit movies were released. one is Kanchanjangha and another is Ratnakar.

Kanchanjangha, released on 5 September become the fastest Assamese film to cross the ₹1 crore mark by doing so in 4 days. The film also crossed the ₹2 crore mark within 1 week after its release. It collected total 7 crore rupees.

Ratnakar, released on 11 October became a hit and earned ₹90.5 lakh in 2 days. After one week of release it earned ₹3.31 crore rupees which is the highest gross for any Assamese cinema in one week. After two weeks it earned total ₹6.63 crore rupees, breaking all box office records of Assamese cinema. After six weeks it collected a total ₹ 10 crore. Ji Galpar Ses Nai was made in 2019 and yet to be released, is the first anthology film directed by Prodyut Kumar Deka, Prashant Saikia and Utpal datta.

=== 2020 ===
Kenny Basumatary directed the films Jiya, Local Utpaat and Local Kung Fu 3, which were mildly successful. Local Utpaat earned more than 1 Crore, becoming the fifth film to do so in Assamese cinema.

=== 2021 ===
In 2021, the Assamese film Bridge, directed by Kripal Kalita, received strong critical acclaim and performed well in limited theatrical release.

=== 2022 ===
In 2022, the romantic drama Emuthi Puthi attracted significant attention and saw success across Assam, marking a strong post-pandemic recovery for Assamese cinema.

=== 2023 ===
In 2023, Sri Raghupati became one of the most successful Assamese films of the decade, grossing more than ₹13 crore worldwide and setting multiple regional box-office records.

=== 2024 ===
In 2024, Local Utpaat, directed by Kenny Basumatary, continued its strong run at the box office and entered the ₹1-crore-plus club, becoming the fifth Assamese film to achieve this milestone.

=== 2025 ===
In 2025, Roi Roi Binale, the final film of Zubeen Garg, became the highest-grossing Assamese film of all time. The film broke all previous records, collecting more than ₹42 crore at the box office.

== List of highest-grossing Assamese films ==
Rank	Title	Worldwide gross	Year	Ref.
1	Roi Roi Binale	₹42 crore	2025	
2	Bidurbhai	₹17.75 crore	2024	
3	Bhaimon Da	₹15.31 crore	2025	
4	Sri Raghupati	₹13.81-15 crore	2023	(Note: News18 Assam North East | Pratidin Time)
5	Rudra	₹10.56 crore	2025	
6	Chupa Chupi	₹10.10 crore	2026	
7	Ratnakar	₹10 crore	2019	
8	Koka Deuta Nati Aru Hati 2	₹7.10 crore	2026	
9	Dr. Bezbaruah 2	₹7 crore	2023	
10	Kanchanjangha	₹7 crore	2019	
11	Mission China	₹6 crore	2017	
12	NRC - Nalparar Ramchandra	₹5.80 crore	2026	
13	Malamal Boyyyz	₹5.17 crore	2025	
14	Sikaar	₹5 crore	2024	

== List of most expensive Assamese films ==
Rank	Title	Budget	Year	Ref
1	Bhaimon Da	₹6 crore	2025	
2	Roi Roi Binale	₹5 crore	2025	
3	Koka Deuta Nati Aru Hati 2	₹5 crore	2026	

== List of highest-grossing Assamese films by opening day ==
Rank	Title	Worldwide gross	Year
1	Roi Roi Binale	₹2.52 crore	2025
2	Rudra	₹40.20 lakh	2025
3	Mission China	₹35.50 lakh	2017
4	Koka Deuta Nati Aru Hati 2	₹30 lakh	2026
5	Ratnakar	₹29.50 lakh	2019
6	Chupa Chupi	₹27 lakh	2026
7	Kanchanjangha	₹24 lakh	2019
8	Sri Raghupati	₹17 lakh	2023

== Assamese Short film ==
Assamese short films refer to the cinematic works produced in the Assamese language, predominantly originating from the northeastern state of Assam, India. These films, typically ranging from a few minutes to half an hour in duration, provide a platform for local filmmakers to tell engaging stories, explore social issues, and showcase Assamese culture and traditions.

== Awards ==
=== Assam State Film Awards ===
Assam State Film Award is an award ceremony for Assamese Films in Guwahati.

=== Prag Cine Awards ===
Prag Cine Awards are presented annually by Prag News. The aim of the award is to give support, recognition and inspiration to the Assamese film industry and honour some of the eminent film personalities who have contributed to the cause of Assamese cinema. The award was first instituted in the year 2003. Starting from 2015, films produced in other Northeastern states were also honoured in this ceremony.

=== Brahmaputra Valley Film Festival ===
Brahmaputra Valley Film Festival is a homage to the rich culture of Northeast India. The festival is dedicated to the film fraternity of the Northeast region of India, especially Assam. It is an initiative for new filmmakers to come together and rediscover various aspects of film making. The film festival is in Guwahati, Assam, India annually since 2013. It is an initiative of Tattva Creations.

=== National Film Award ===
Assamese films have earned National Film Award in multiple categories.

== See also ==
- Joymoti (1935 film)
- Munin Baruah
- Zubeen Garg
