= Viva (band) =

Indian pop girl group

- Origin: India
- Genre: Pop
- Years active: 2002–2005 (approx)
- Labels: Times Music; Musicurry
- Past members: Seema Ramchandani; Pratichee Mohapatra; Neha Bhasin; Mahua Kamat; Anushka Manchanda

Viva, also known as Viva!, was an Indian pop girl group that formed in 2002, composed of the winners of the first season of Indian version of the international television talent show Popstars, named Coke [V] Popstars, after its principal sponsors, Coca-Cola and music channel Channel [V].

== Background ==
The five original members were Seema Ramchandani, Pratichee Mohapatra (sister of Sona Mohapatra), Neha Bhasin, Mahua Kamat, and Anushka Manchanda. The group was formed in April 2002 after Channel [V] started a talent hunt to form a girl's only pop band in India. The band released its first track, Hum Naye Geet Sunaye, composed by Shankar–Ehsaan–Loy; initially released as a single, it was added to their debut album VIVA. The same month, the band had its first show in Mumbai with 50,000 attendees.

Their first album VIVA featured popular tracks like ‘Jahan ho Pyaar ka Mausam’ and ‘Jaago Zara’, with lyrics written by Javed Akhtar and composed by several music directors, including Shankar–Ehsaan–Loy and Jatin–Lalit. While the album became widely popular, Ramchandani left the group 6 months later to join the Art of Living Foundation. Ramchandani then released an art of living album which is an amalgamation of prayers from all religions.

The remaining four member of the band launched their second and last album Viva! - Reloaded in 2003. They also sung 'Rozana' from Bollywood film Lakeer composed by A.R. Rahman and 'Quiero (Din Humara Hai)' from Rakht.

Though there has been no official report about the group's split, they have not released an album since 2003, and the members have all embarked on solo careers.

In 2005, Mohapatra released a solo album, titled With Love, Pratichee. The same year, Manchanda joined Channel [V] as a VJ, and has since become a playback singer for Hindi, Tamil language and Telugu language films. Bhasin also turned to playback singing in 2006. Mohapatra turned to acting and worked in the serial Mr. and Mrs. Mishra. Manchanda participated in the reality show Khatron Ke Khiladi.

The group reunited virtually in May 2020 during the COVID-19 pandemic to re-release the song Jaago Zara. Pratichee Mohapatra, Neha Bhasin, Mahua Kamat, and Anushka Manchanda, the 4 members, recorded the songs separately due to the lockdown, with Manchanda editing the video and releasing it.

In May 2026, more than 2 decades after release, Viva's albums, VIVA and VIVA Reloaded, was officially made available on streaming platforms, allowing users to enjoy the pop nostalgia of early 2000s from Viva. The group expressed positive reception and nostalgia as the albums were released online.

== Discography ==
=== Non-films ===
| Year | Debut Singles, EPs, Albums | Label |
|---|---|---|
| 2002 | VIVA! | Times Music (Physical); KaanPhod Music (Digital) |
| 2003 | Viva! Reloaded | Times Music (Physical); KaanPhod Music (Digital) |

=== Films ===
| Year | Song | Movie Soundtracks | Language | Label |
|---|---|---|---|---|
| 2004 | Quiero | Rakht | Hindi | T-Series |
| 2004 | Rozana | Lakeer | Hindi | T-Series |
| 2005 | Chillake Chillake | Chehraa | Hindi | T-Series |
| 2005 | Theme Song | Manmadha (Telugu) | Telugu | Aditya Music |

== See also ==
- A Band of Boys
