= Sonapur, Assam =

Sonapur
- Town
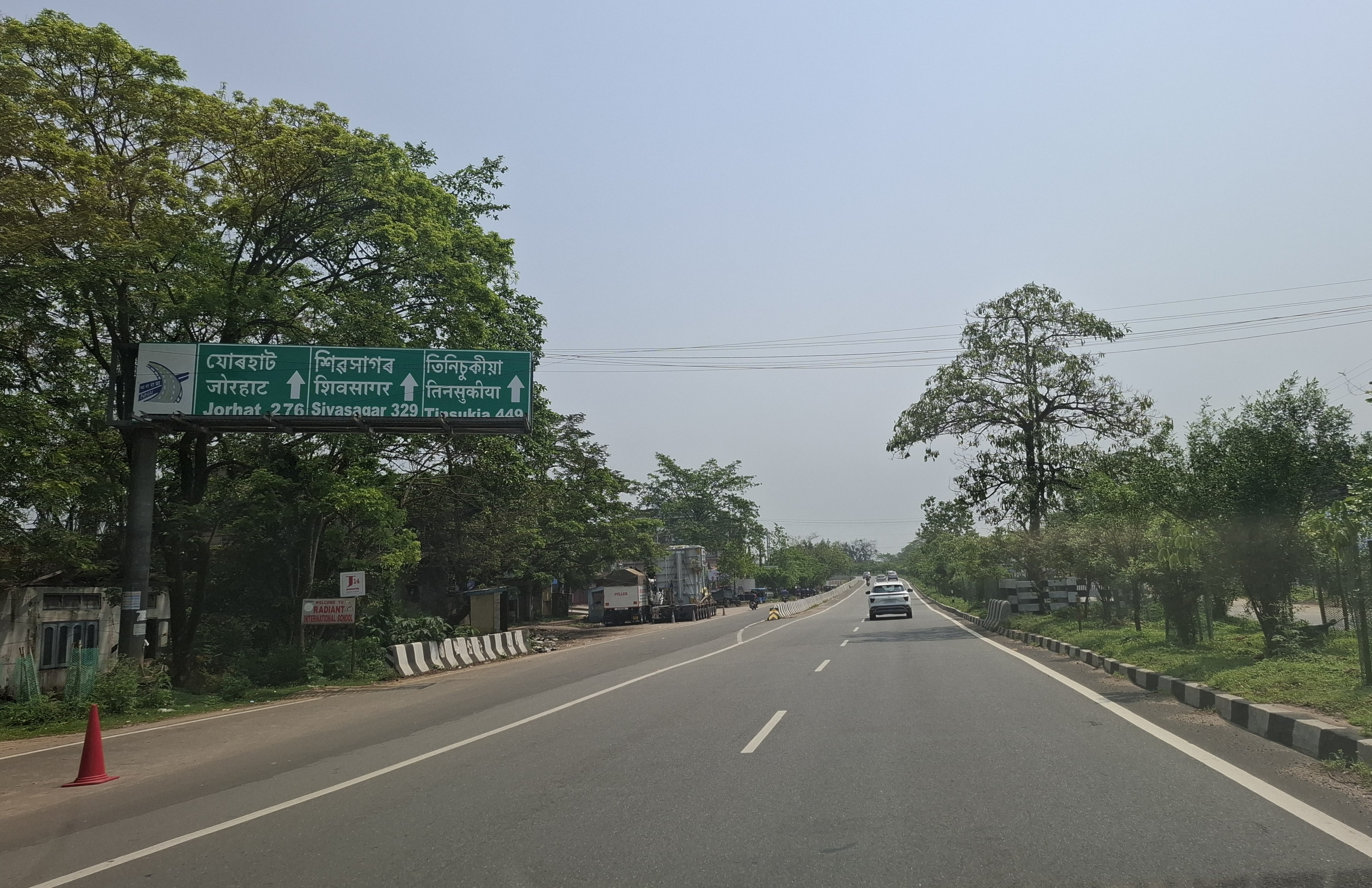

- Location in Assam, India Sonapur (India)
- Coordinates: 26.12°N 91.98°E
- Country: India
- State: Assam
- District: Kamrup (Metro)

Languages
  - Official: Assamese
- Time zone: UTC+5:30 (IST)
- Postal code: 782402
- ISO 3166 code: IN-AS
- Vehicle registration: AS

Sonapur is a small town located in the outskirts (20 km away) of Guwahati city in Kamrup Metropolitan district of the Indian state of Assam. Sonapur is situated beside National Highway 37 near the river Digaru, which flows into the Kalang river close to its embouchure into the Brahmaputra.

The Tiwa (Lalung), Boro, Assamese, Karbi communities form the majority in this area.

== Education ==
Sonapur College is the premier higher educational institution of Sonapur. The North East Regional Centre of Lakshmibai National Institute of Physical Education is located at Tepesia Sports Complex here.

== Healthcare ==
The District Hospital, Sonapur is situated near the NH 37 which has all the major healthcare facilities.
