= Ramen Baruah =

Indian music composer (born 1939)

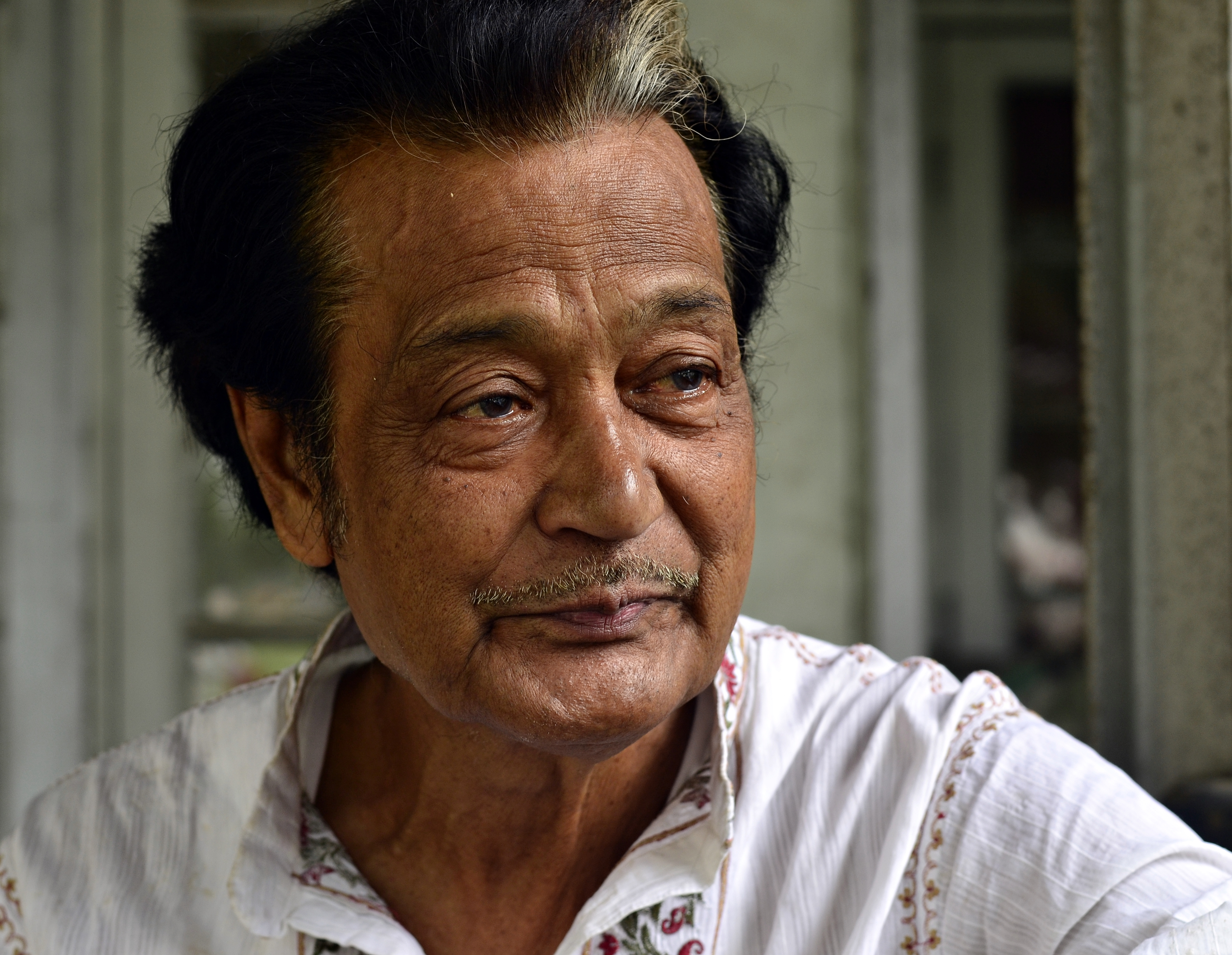
- Baruah in 2017
- Born: 6 June 1939; Guwahati, Assam, India
- Status: Missing since 22 July 2024
- Occupations: Music director, playback singer
- Known for: Soundtrack composition for Assamese cinema
- Relatives: Dwipen Baruah (brother); Brajen Baruah (brother); Nip Baruah (brother)

Ramen Baruah is an Indian music director and playback singer from Assam. He was born on 6 June 1939 into a family involved in music and the arts. Over his career, he created music for several Assamese films. He received a State Lifetime Achievement Award from the Government of Assam in 2010. Bauah has been missing since 22 July 2024 after leaving his home in Guwahati.

== Early life ==
Baruah grew up in the Latasil neighborhood of Guwahati. His parents were Chandranath Baruah and Joonprabha Baruah. His brothers Brajen Baruah and Nip Baruah were also involved in Assamese cinema.

== Career ==
Baruah started his work in music as a playback singer. He sang a song for the 1955 film Smritir Paras. In 1959, he worked as an assistant music director on the film Amar Ghar.

He began composing music independently a few years later. He composed the music for the 1969 film Dr. Bezbarua. He subsequently composed music for films including Baruar Sansar, Mukuta, Yog-Biyog, Lalita, and Kokadeuta Nati Aru Hati. He was an approved composer for the general programmes of All India Radio and was a member of its audition board in Guwahati.

== Disappearance ==
On 22 July 2024, Baruah went missing after leaving his home in Guwahati. CCTV footage showed him walking towards the Brahmaputra riverbank near the Gauhati High Court. His last phone tower location was also reported to be near the High Court. Police, along with the State Disaster Response Force and National Disaster Response Force, searched the area but did not find him. On 13 August, Assam Chief Minister Himanta Biswa Sarma said that witnesses had reported seeing Baruah heading towards the river and that there had been no conclusive result from the search.

== Awards and honors ==
- State Lifetime Achievement Award (2010) — Government of Assam.
- Jeewan Ram Mungi Devi Goenka Award (2010) — Presented for his work in regional culture.
- Tarun Duvarah Memorial Award (2010) — Awarded by the Gauhati Artists' Guild.
