= Mission China =

2017 Indian action drama film

Mission China: Kill The Terror
- Theatrical release poster
- Directed by: Zubeen Garg
- Written by: Zubeen Garg
- Screenplay by: Zubeen Garg
- Story by: Zubeen Garg
- Produced by: Zubeen Garg, Garima Saikia Garg
- Starring: Zubeen Garg; Deeplina Deka; Siddharth Nipon Goswami; Yankee Parashar
- Cinematography: Suman Duwarah, Pradip Daimary
- Edited by: Pratim Khaund
- Music by: Zubeen Garg
- Production company: Eye Creations
- Distributed by: Siddharth Goenka (Goenka Enterprises)
- Release date: 8 September 2017
- Running time: 90 min
- Country: India
- Languages: Assamese; Hindi
- Budget: ₹2 crore (US$210,000)
- Box office: ₹6 crore (US$640,000)

Mission China is a 2017 Indian Assamese-language action drama film directed by Zubeen Garg and produced by Garima Saikia Garg as well as Zubeen Garg himself under the banner of "Eye Creation Productions". The film features Zubeen Garg and Deeplina Deka in lead roles and Sattyakee D'com Bhuyan, Siddharth Nipon Goswami, Yankee Parashar, Parthasarathi Mahanta, Pabitra Rabha, Bibhuti Bhushan Hazarika, Tridib Lahon, Nabadweep Borgohain, Ragini Parashar and Bhashwati Bharati in supporting roles. Zubeen also wrote the script and screenplay for the film.

== Cast ==
- Zubeen Garg as Colonel Goswami
- Pabitra Rabha as Lama, the main antagonist
- Deeplina Deka as Chayan, Colonel Goswami's love interest
- Siddharth Nipon Goswami as Sidd
- Yankee Parashar as Ragini, Sidd's love interest
- Sattyakee D'com Bhuyan as D'com, a sniper
- Tridib Lahon as Spider, a bomb specialist
- Priyanka Bharali & Debosmita Banerjee (special appearance in the song "Raat Jwale")

== Production ==
Mission China is produced by Garima Saikia Garg and Zubeen Garg under the banner of "I Creation Productions". Mission China is shot in many locations such as Mirza, Sikkim, Shillong, Dima Hasao, Tawang etc.

== Release ==
Mission China was released on 8 September 2017 in Assam with nearly 168 daily screenings. The movie has gathered positive responses from fans. The movie is also scheduled to release in Mumbai, Pune, Delhi and Bangalore. The movie was scheduled to release in Bengali in December 2017. Zubeen Garg said that he is planning to make another part of Mission China and invest more than ₹ 4 crores this time.

== Box office ==
Mission China was released on 8 September across 65 cinema halls, eight of them outside Assam including Delhi, Bangalore & Mumbai.The first, second and third day collections were ₹ 39.97 lakh, ₹ 39.50 lakh and ₹ 49 lakh respectively. The fourth day collection was ₹ 39 lakh and that of the fifth day was ₹ 39 lakh. A total of ₹ 2 crore 40 lakh were collected within the first week.

Mission China has also beaten the first-day collection record of blockbuster Baahubali 2: The Conclusion (2017) and Salman Khan's Bajrangi Bhaijaan (2015) by a considerable margin in Assam.

It is currently the 9th highest grossing Assamese film.

== Soundtrack ==
Mission China

Soundtrack album by Zubeen Garg
- Released: 18 November 2016
- Recorded: 2015–2016
- Genre: Feature film soundtrack
- Length: 41:25
- Languages: Assamese; Hindi; Bengali
- Label: Times Music
- Producer: Zubeen Garg

Zubeen Garg chronology
Dil Toh Deewana Hai (2016)	Mission China (2016)	Gangs Of North East (2017)

Singles from Mission China
- 1. "Din Jwale Rati Jwale" Released: 28 July 2017; 2. "Raat Jwale" Released: 18 August 2017; 3. "Mero Mayaalai" Released: 24 August 2017; 4. "Naino Se Nikalte" Released: 18 November 2017

The film contains eight songs sung by Zubeen Garg, Nachiketa Chakraborty, Joi Barua, Amit Paul, Siddharth Hazarika, Rohit Sonar, Zublee, Satabdi Borah, Mrinmoyee Goswami, and Turi. The lyrics of the songs are written by Zubeen Garg, Sasanka Samir, and Sumit Acharya. It was released on November 18, 2016, on the occasion of Zubeen Garg's 44th Birthday at Kalaguru Festival.

The first music video of Mission China, "Din Jwole Raati Jwole" was released on 28 July 2017. It was well received by the listeners with the YouTube release having gathered around 1.9 lakh views within 24 hours of its release.

The film marked one of the Assamese's last film soundtracks featured on Audio CD format, as most new film soundtracks had switched to digital streaming format.

Track List
No.	Title	Lyrics	Artist (s)	Length
1.	"Din Jwole Raati Jwole"	Zubeen Garg	Zubeen Garg, Zublee Baruah	05:41
2.	"Naino Se Nikalte"	Sumit Acharya	Nachiketa Chakraborty, Turi	05:04
3.	"Mero Mayalaai"	Sasanka Samir	Zubeen Garg, Satabdi Borah	04:59
4.	"Raat Jwale"	Zubeen Garg	Mrinmoyee Goswami	05:10
5.	"Every Morning Comes"	Zubeen Garg	Joi Barua, Zubeen Garg	05:03
6.	"Naino Se Nikalte" (Reprise)	Sumit Acharya	Zubeen Garg, Turi	05:04
7.	"Mission China" (Title Track)	Zubeen Garg	Zubeen Garg, Siddharth Hazarika, Rohit Sonar, Amit Paul	04:40
8.	"Din Jwole Raati Jwole" (Bengali Version)	Priyo Chattopadhyay	Zubeen Garg, Zublee Baruah	04:50
Total length:				41:25
