= Zubeen Garg =

Indian musician and actor (1972–2025)

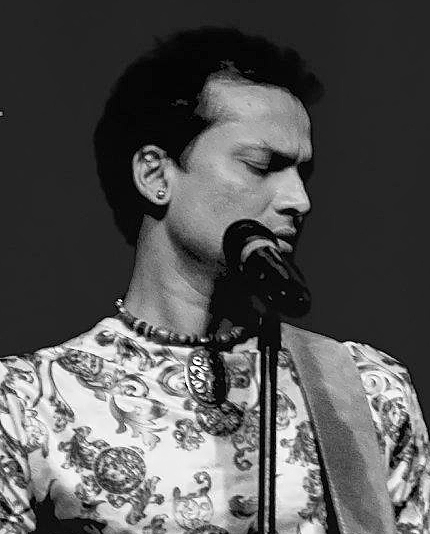
- Garg performing in 2025

Background information
- Born: 18 November 1972; Tura, Meghalaya, India
- Died: 19 September 2025 (aged 52) Singapore
- Genres: (Borgeet, Ojapali etc); Indian folk (Bihu, Kamrupi, Goalparia, Tokari etc); Indian pop; Hindustani classical; sufi; filmi; rock; blues
- Occupations: Singer; songwriter; percussionist; composer; music director; music producer; lyricist; multi-instrumentalist; actor; film director; film producer; screenwriter; poet
- Instruments: Vocals; guitar; drum; tabla; keyboard; dhol
- Works: Discography; filmography; bibliography
- Years active: 1992–2025
- Labels: NK Production; Sony Music; Magnasound Records; Universal Music Group; Times Music; Virgin Records; EMI Records; T-Series; Zee Music Company; Eros Now; Saregama; SVF; Surinder Films; Eskay Movies; Echo Music; Dhwani Records; Zubeen Garg Music; Apon Records; AC Multimedia; Jollywood Now Music
- Spouse: Garima Saikia Garg (m. 2002)

Zubeen Garg (Assamese: [zubin gaɹg]; 18 November 1972 – 19 September 2025) was an Indian musician, composer, singer, songwriter who primarily worked and sang in the Assamese, Bengali, and Hindi-language films and music industries. He also sang in 40 other languages and dialects, including Bishnupriya Manipuri, Adi, Boro, Dimasa, English, Goalpariya, Gujarati, Kannada, Karbi, Malayalam, Marathi, Mising, Rabha, Garo, Nepali, Bhojpuri, Odia, Sadri, Sanskrit, Sindhi, Tamil, Telugu, Tiwa and Urdu.

Garg was a multi-instrumentalist and played many instruments including anandalahari, dhol, dotara, drums, guitar, harmonica, harmonium, mandolin, keyboard, tabla, and various percussion instruments. He was regarded as one of the most influential musicians in Assam, and was reportedly the highest-paid singer in Assam. Over a career spanning 33 years, he recorded over 40,000 songs. (Note: Credited to multiple sources which claim he recorded over 38,000 or 40,000 songs.)

== Early life and family ==
Zubeen was born on 18 November 1972, into an Assamese Brahmin family in Tura, Meghalaya, to Mohini Mohon Borthakur and Ily Borthakur. His first name was chosen in homage to Zubin Mehta. His given last name was initially "Borthakur" but later instead of continuing with it, he chose "Garg", the title of his Brahmin gotra.

Zubeen's father was a magistrate, and is also known as a lyricist and poet under the pen name Kapil Thakur. As a magistrate, his father was frequently transferred due to which Zubeen spent parts of his childhood moving with the family. His mother, Ily Borthakur, was a singer. His sister Jonkie Borthakur, a singer and actress, died in a car accident in February 2002 in Sonitpur district. She was travelling to perform a stage show along with her co-artists. Their last sibling duo album Sishu which was released on Oct 2002 is dedicated to her. His younger sister Palme Borthakur is an assistant professor of geography at the University of Science and Technology, Meghalaya and Royal Global University.

=== Education ===
Garg pursued his primary education at Carmel School, Jorhat, and later attended Karimganj High School and Bijni Bandhab High School. He passed his matriculation exam (class 10th) from Tamulpur Higher Secondary School, Nalbari in 1989. In the same year, he returned to Bongal Pukhuri, Jorhat, for his higher secondary education in science at the Jagannath Barooah College. After that, he went to pursue Bachelor of Science degree in B. Borooah College in 1991 after passing his HS Final Exam, but dropped out to concentrate on his singing career.

=== Introduction to music ===
Garg started to sing from the age of three. His first guru was his mother from whom he learnt to sing and he learnt playing the tabla from Pandit Robin Banerjee for 11 years. Guru Ramani Rai introduced him to Assamese folk music. Garg had been composing songs since his school days.

== Singing career ==
=== Beginning of singing career (1992–1995) ===
Garg made his debut in 1992 with his Assamese solo album, Anamika under the record label NK Production. In the same year, he had won a gold medal for his western solo performance in a youth festival. His first recorded songs were "Tumi Janu Pariba Hun" and "Tumi Junaki Hubakh" for the album Ritu, but it was not released until 1993. He released many other albums such as Xopunor Xur (1992), Junaki Mon (1993), Maya (1994), Asha (1995) and more. Before he moved to Mumbai in 1995, he released his first Bihu album Ujan Piriti which was a commercial success.

=== Bollywood singing career (1995–2024) ===
In mid 1995, Garg moved to Mumbai to work in the Bollywood music industry where he released his first Indipop solo album Chandni Raat. Later, he recorded Hindi cover and remix albums including Shradhaanjali Vol. 1 (1996), RE-MIX Tere Mere Beechmein (1996), Chanda (1996), Shradhaanjali Vol. 2 (1997), Shradhaanjali Vol. 3 (1998), Jalwa (1998) and others. In November 1998, he released his second Indipop album Yuhi Kabhi, which showcased newcomer actress Bhumika Chawla, and it was also his first music video to be aired on Channel V music channel in India.

He sang for films including Gaddaar (1995), Purani Kabar, Joubone Amoni Kore (1998), Dil Se (1998), Doli Saja Ke Rakhna (1998), Fiza (2000), Kaante (2002) and more. In 2003, he sang "Sapne Saare" and "Khwabon Ki" from the movie Mudda-The Issue, "Maango Agar Dil Se Toh Khuda" from the movie Chupke Se, "Holi Re" from the movie Mumbai se Aiya Mera Dost and "Jo Pyar Tumne" from the movie Jaal: The Trap.

Garg got his biggest breakthrough in Bollywood from the movie Gangster where he sang the song "Ya Ali". The song won him the best playback singer Global Indian Film Awards (GIFA) in 2006.

In February 2007, he collaborated with Ustad Sultan Khan to sing "Jag Lal Lal Lal" for the movie Big Brother. His next Hindi album Zindagi was released on 29 August 2007.

=== Bengali singing career (1997–2025) ===
Apart from singing in the Bollywood and Assamese film and music industries, he entered in the Bengali music industry in 1997 where he released his first Bengali album Surer Upahar featuring lead co-vocals by Mausumi Saharia and background vocals by Mili Baruah and Sagarika, who is the sister of Shaan. In 2003, he sang two songs, "O Mon Bolaka" and "Abhilashi Mone" in the film Mon. In the next year, he sang three songs in the film Shudhu Tumi and was the film's music director. In the same year, he sang "O Bondhure" and "Lagena Bhalo" in the film Premi. In 2008, he recorded several Bengali songs like "Mon mane Na" from the movie Mon Mane Na, "Piya re Piya re" from the movie Chirodini Tumi je Amaar, and "Mon Jete Chay Shudhu" from the movie Love story.

== Acting career ==
Apart from singing, Garg also made his debut as an actor and director for the film Tumi Mor Matho Mor, which was released in early 2000 under NK Production. He acted some films like Prem Aru Prem (2002), Dinabandhu (2004), Mon Jaai (2008), Bhal Pabo Najanilu (2013), Gaane Ki Aane (2016), Mission China (2017), Priyaar Priyo (2017), The Underworld (2018), Kanchanjangha (2019), Rajneeti (2022), Dr. Bezbaruah 2 (2023), Sikaar (2024) and Roi Roi Binale (2025).

== Artistry ==
=== Musical styles ===
Garg's music has been described as soulful, rooted in folk rather than classical traditions. His work spanned genres from folk to pop, often intertwined with Sufi tunes. His early musical style was marked by a fusion of rock, Indian classical music, and Assamese folk elements that helped broaden the Assamese music, parallelling the Sufi trend that emerged in Bollywood during the early 2000s. Since the release of his breakthrough album Anamika in 1992, he was recognised as a trendsetter in Assam for blending Western and regional influences while also contributing to the revival of traditional Assamese music. Over the years, he has collaborated with nearly 250 tribal communities across Assam learning and preserving more than five thousand traditional folk songs. He has often described himself primarily as a folk singer.

A multilingual vocalist, Garg recorded in Assamese, Bengali, Hindi, English, Tamil, Telugu, Kannada, Punjabi, and several tribal dialects of Northeast India. His musical versatility was reflected in his ability to perform a wide range of styles from romantic and devotional to Bihu-tuned and modern songs. He has sung many Bihu songs, Borgeet, lukogeets, tribal folk songs like oi ni:toms of the Misings, and Zikir (Sufi devotional songs).

Several of Garg's albums, such as Xixhu and Mukti, expressed themes of dissent and opposition toward the socio-political elite. Over time, he faced criticism for what some perceive as moral ambiguity, social irresponsibility, and an excessive inclination toward Western musical styles. In response to debates concerning the definition of folk music in Assam, Garg said, "I made my songs in the way in which I feel comfortable. Art is all about freedom."

Garg gained national recognition in Bollywood with the 2006 song "Ya Ali" from Gangster, composed by Pritam. Despite the song's success, Garg did not fully transition into mainstream Bollywood playback singing. In an interview with PTI, he said:

Bollywood music is changing with a slow pace. No doubt that new genres are coming to play but at the same time we are clinging to the formula of previous hit numbers. Even I was getting typecast after 'Ya Ali' in 2006, so I rejected many offers. I had a bad name in the industry for that. But I don't think about it because I am not in a hurry to take up projects.

=== Cinematic styles ===
Beyond music, Garg explored filmmaking as an extension of his artistic vision. He wrote, directed, and starred many Assamese Films. He preferred realism and political themes over conventional song-and-dance narratives. His cinematic themes often centred on Assamese identity, youth idealism, conflict, and social change, consistent with his musical activism. When asked about shifting his focus from music to films—particularly while writing and directing his film Chakra—He explained that he viewed the two art forms as interconnected:

I had been in terms with films since long as my mother, Illy Borthakur, was an Assamese actress, so I think I am quite experienced now to move into films or direct one, also I want to create a different personality of mine; neither as a performer nor as a singer but as an all-rounder.

In another interview, when asked if singers can act, he answered:

Kishore Kumar has shown us that it is possible. I prefer serious roles, though I like to dance in music videos. These days, composers are turning singers. That is a problem for us. None of them can pull it off, except Himesh [Reshammiya].

=== Influences ===
Garg grew up listening to his father's collection of old classics, including country, rock, and blues and said he was a fan of ethnic music. He has been inspired by many artists from Assam, Bollywood and beyond. He has mentioned Bhupen Hazarika, Bishnu Prasad Rabha and poet Hiren Bhattacharya as major influences from Assam. He also admired singers like Kishore Kumar, Asha Bhosle, Mohammed Rafi, Nusrat Fateh Ali Khan and Begum Akhtar, and composers S. D. Burman, R. D. Burman, A. R. Rahman and Ilaiyaraaja. Among his western influences, he admired Sting, Pink Floyd, Kenny G and expressed his desire for composing a song for them.

Garg had mentioned Charlie Chaplin as one his favourite icons. He once had a tattoo of Chaplin with the phrase "I can fall but never fail"

== Public image ==
Garg was known for his bold and outspoken statements. His remarks on social, religious, and cultural issues drew both support and criticism, often making public remarks on politicians and ministers. On one occasion, he publicly made a humorous statement on chief minister Himanta Biswa Sarma, who had been photographed leaping on stage like him, questioning why Sarma was "imitating" him and said "that's my style, and you can't copy my style" He also spoke openly about alcohol use, once saying that some of his songs were made while he was drunk. Despite advice from well-wishers to avoid making controversial statements, Garg said he could not restrain his opinions. He is known for the phrase "Moi ghenta kaku khatir nokoru, you can't dictate me" (translated as: "I don't give a damn to anyone, you can't dictate me").

Garg was one of the non-political figures in the Anti-CAA protests in Assam. His song "Politics Nokoriba Bandhu" (translated as "Don't do politics, my friend") was released as an expression of his disillusionment with the state's corrupt politics. The song was widely adopted as an anthem of dissent during various protests against political corruption.

=== Controversies and criticism ===
In 2015, Garg in a live performance at Khanapara of Guwahati, wielded a gun threatening the audience not to leave otherwise he would shoot them. He said "I'll sing with this gun now. It's not fake, it's real. Don't go away or I'll shoot you." Later police arrived and found that it was a toy gun.

In 2017, he was sentenced to three months in jail and fined ₹5,000 in connection with a 2013 assault case. The case involved allegations that he had slapped a minor, for smoking in public. The boy was the son of senior advocate Arup Chandra Borbora and grandson of former chief minister of Assam Golap Borbora. Garg was acquitted under Section 341 of the Indian Penal Code but found guilty under Sections 323 (voluntarily causing hurt) and 506 (criminal intimidation). His legal team accepted the judgement and announced plans to appeal before the Sessions Judge Court.

In 2018, Garg publicly advised athlete Hima Das to consume beef rather than chicken or pigeon meat, claiming that beef would help her gain greater strength for national and international competitions. He argued that when it comes to sports, factors such as religion, caste, and creed should be put aside in favour of what benefits athletic performance. The statement generated controversy within Assam.

In January 2019, a short audio clip circulated on social media in which Garg appeared to use "unparliamentary" language to criticise the posthumous conferral of the Bharat Ratna on Bhupen Hazarika. An FIR was filed at the Lanka Police Station in Hojai district by Satya Ranjan Borah (of the Assam Kisan Morcha, affiliated with the BJP) alleging that the remarks defamed the Bharat Ratna, insulted Hazarika and hurt public sentiment. Garg acknowledged that the voice in the clip was his and published a social media post stating that his objection was not to Bhupen Hazarika personally, but to what he described as the political appropriation and timing of the award.

In 2019, the artist faced a controversy when he said, "I am Brahmin, but I have snapped my lagun (a sacred thread worn by Brahmins) in the movie. I had removed the thread earlier, and still don't wear it. These Brahmins should be killed". But, later he clarified that he did not mean that way. He said- "I told it jokingly, so people have misinterpreted it. I meant that-the system of high caste-low caste should be eliminated. I believe in that concept. In that attempt, the word 'Bamun' was a slip of tongue. Therefore, I apologise in front of Brahmin Society since that was not my intent. I am a brahmin boy too. People have seen-what I have been doing all these years. I have worked for all sections of people." Additionally, Garg said- "I was also exhausted at that time as I was continuously performing for the last 3-4 nights. That might be also a reason. I am sorry. This won't happen in the future.

In April 2024, during Bihu concert, he said to the crowd that Krishna was not a God but a man. He was subsequently banned from Majuli District Satra Mahasabha.

=== Philanthropy ===
Garg ran a charity, the Kalaguru Artiste Foundation, which donates money for various causes. He urged people to donate clothes, medicines and contributions when devastating floods hit Assam. He took on the issue over corruption in APSC recruitment in his movie Kanchanjangha.

He was a football fan and has played matches to collect funds for flood-affected people.

In May 2021, during a surge in COVID-19 cases, Garg offered his two-storey house in Guwahati to be converted into a COVID Care Centre. This act aimed to address the rising demand for beds for patients at the time.

== Personal life ==
Garg met his wife, Garima Saikia, a fashion designer from Golaghat, after she wrote him a letter expressing admiration for his albums Anamika and Maya. They got married on 4 February 2002.

He considered himself irreligious and said that he did not have any caste or god.

== Death ==
On 19 September 2025, Garg died in Singapore, at the age of 52. He died while swimming in a sea without a life jacket off the coast of Saint John's Island. He was administered CPR and rushed to Singapore General Hospital, where he was pronounced dead in the intensive care unit around 2:30 pm IST.

=== Funeral ===
The cremation ground, spanning 3.3 acres of government-allotted land in Kamarkuchi, Sonapur NC village near Guwahati, was volunteered by local villagers; it accommodates up to 5,000 mourners. Garg's body lay in state at the Arjuna Bhogeswar Baruah Sports Complex, Guwahati, until the morning of 23 September for the public to pay tributes.

Garg was cremated with full state honours on 23 September with a 21-gun salute.

On 30 September 2025, Garg's ashes were brought to Jorhat for the traditional 13th-day Adyashraddha ceremony on 1 October. It was attended by his family and thousands of fans. The Assam government announced plans to construct a memorial in Jorhat to honour his legacy, in addition to a memorial in Guwahati. The ashes remained at a public venue in Jorhat for a few days, allowing fans and well-wishers to pay their final tributes.

On 29 October 2025, Garg's ashes were immersed in the Brahmaputra River.

=== Tributes ===
Garg's death prompted widespread tributes across India. Many high-profile individuals, including Prime Minister Narendra Modi, leader of the opposition Rahul Gandhi, and the Chief Minister of Assam, Himanta Biswa Sarma, expressed their condolences. As a tribute, the Government of Assam declared a three-day state mourning from 20 to 22 September and later it was extended to 23 September to cover the day of his funeral and cremation. West Bengal Chief Minister Mamata Banerjee also expressed grief, describing Garg as her "dear brother" and praising his "mellifluous voice and indomitable spirit," adding that his songs will remain "immortal forever."

In addition to political leaders, numerous figures from the Indian film and music industries expressed grief over Garg's death. Fellow Assamese singer Papon described the loss as comparable to losing a brother, calling Garg "the voice of a generation." Music director Pritam Chakraborty, who had collaborated with him on Gangster (2006), stated that he was "shocked and devastated" and conveyed condolences to Garg's family.

Musician A. R. Rahman, veteran singer Hariharan, composer Jeet Ganguly, lyricist Sameer Anjaan, rapper Badshah, pop band A Band of Boys, Viva, singers Alisha Chinai, Amaal Mallik, Debojit Saha, Kalpana Patowary, Mahalakshmi Iyer, Neha Bhasin, Raageshwari Loomba Swaroop, Sagarika, Shaan, Shilpa Rao, Shreya Ghoshal, Sowmya Raoh, Suchitra Krishnamoorthi, Sunidhi Chauhan, Tarali Sarma, Vishal Mishra, Vishal Dadlani, and actors Dev, Jatin Bora, Prosenjit Chatterjee and Ravi Sarma also shared tributes on social media, recalling Garg's cross‑genre contributions from Assamese folk to Bollywood. Assamese actor Adil Hussain called the news "shocking and heartbreaking," emphasising Garg's cultural importance in Assamese music and cinema. On 21 September 2025, at the trailer launch of Raghu Dakat, a 30‑second silence was observed at Netaji Indoor Stadium in Kolkata in Garg's memory.

Bollywood actor Aamir Khan wrote "A true legend, his voice touched millions, and his music shaped generations." Randeep Hooda wrote "Legends never die, they live on through their art." MP Kangana Ranaut who debuted in Bollywood with the movie Gangster: A Love Story, for which Garg sang the song "Ya Ali", paid her heartfelt tribute and wrote "#Zubeenda No one like you!"

Film critic Utpal Borpujari recalled Garg's benevolence saying "There are countless stories of how he helped those who needed medical treatment and children at orphanages."

Writer and activist Taslima Nasrin posted in social media X saying "Unlike many Bengali artists, he never tried to act like a refined gentleman. He was never arrogant."

Alisha Chinai said "He was not politically correct. He hated Bombay, you know, he hated the Bollywood scene. He said what he felt, and that was something I really admired about him. But when I look back, I feel like I wish I had sat and talked to him a little more. He came and he left. He came like the wind and left like the wind."

Garg had expressed in a 2019 concert at B. Borooah College, Guwahati, that his song "Mayabini Raatir Bukut" should be played when he died. Following his death, the song was performed not only at his funeral but also widely across Assam, in homes, and public events, becoming a collective anthem of shraddhanjali (tribute).

=== Investigation and aftermath ===
The death certificate issued by the Singapore authorities listed the cause of death as drowning. Several first information reports were filed against his manager, Siddhartha Sharma, and the festival organiser, Shyamkanu Mahanta, alleging negligence and lack of safety measures, including reports that Garg had declined to wear a life jacket. His wife later appealed for withdrawal of cases against his manager. Following public demand, the Assam government ordered a second post-mortem at the Gauhati Medical College and Hospital (GMCH) with the consent of Garg's family members. GMCH's official post-mortem report confirmed that Garg's death was "not caused by poisoning."

In September 2025, following public demand and Assamese artists' pressure, a Special Investigation Team (SIT) was formed to probe the investigation. Following SIT's assistance, the CID registered a case (no. 18 of 2025) in connection with the suspicious death of Garg. Raids were carried out at the residences of the festival organiser and Garg's manager, during which electronic records and documents were seized. The SIT also questioned and detained musician Shekhar Jyoti Goswami, who had accompanied Garg during the diving trip in Singapore. Assam Chief Minister Himanta Biswa Sarma remarked that if the SIT failed to produce conclusive results, the case would be handed over to the Central Bureau of Investigation. In light of public anger, the All Assam Lawyers' Association urged their members not to represent persons accused in the case of the death of Garg.

On 1 October 2025, Singaporean authorities provided a copy of Garg's autopsy report to the High Commission of India upon its request, as well as a report of their preliminary investigations. They announced that investigations would take about three months before Singapore's State Coroner could determine if a coroner's inquiry would be held. The Indian SIT team separately detained festival organiser Mahanta and Garg's manager Sharma on the same day to have their statements recorded. SIT also arrested musician Goswami, co-singer Amritprabha Mahanta, Garg's cousin DSP Sandipan Garg, and Garg's personal security officers Nandeswar Bora and Paresh Baishya.

Later in the same month, Goswami alleged that Garg's manager Sharma and festival organiser Mahanta may have poisoned him. Goswami claimed that Sharma dismissed visible signs such as frothing from Garg's mouth and nose as acid reflux and delayed seeking medical assistance. He also alleged that Sharma had taken control of the yacht from its sailor and was heard saying "Jabo De, Jabo De" (translation: "Let him go, Let him go") as Garg was struggling in the water. Goswami emphasised that Garg was an expert swimmer who had trained both him and Sharma, making accidental drowning highly unlikely.

In November 2025, Sarma, the Chief Minister of Assam, stated that "Zubeen Garg was murdered" and that the SIT would submit the chargesheet before 17 December. The SIT submitted 3,500-page charge sheet in the court of the Chief Judicial Magistrate, Guwahati on 12 December 2025. SIT issued murder charges against Shyamkanu Mahanta, Siddharth Sharma, Amritprava Mahanta, and Shekhar Jyoti Goswami, while Sandipan Garg, Nandeswar Bora, and Paresh Baishya were included under various charges.

A coroner's inquiry into his death was opened on 14 January 2026 in Singapore. Assistant Superintendent of Police David Linn testified that Garg was intoxicated and refused a life vest before jumping off a yacht. Linn added that as Garg's friends tried to convince him to swim back to the yacht, Garg suddenly became motionless and began floating face down. Toxicology analysis found a blood alcohol concentration of 333-milligrams per 100-milliliters of blood, which can result in impaired coordination and reflexes. (Note: For comparison, Singapore's legal drink driving limit is 80 milligrams per 100ml of blood.)

In March 2026, the Singapore coroner ruled the death as an accidental drowning and found no evidence of foul play.

== Legacy ==
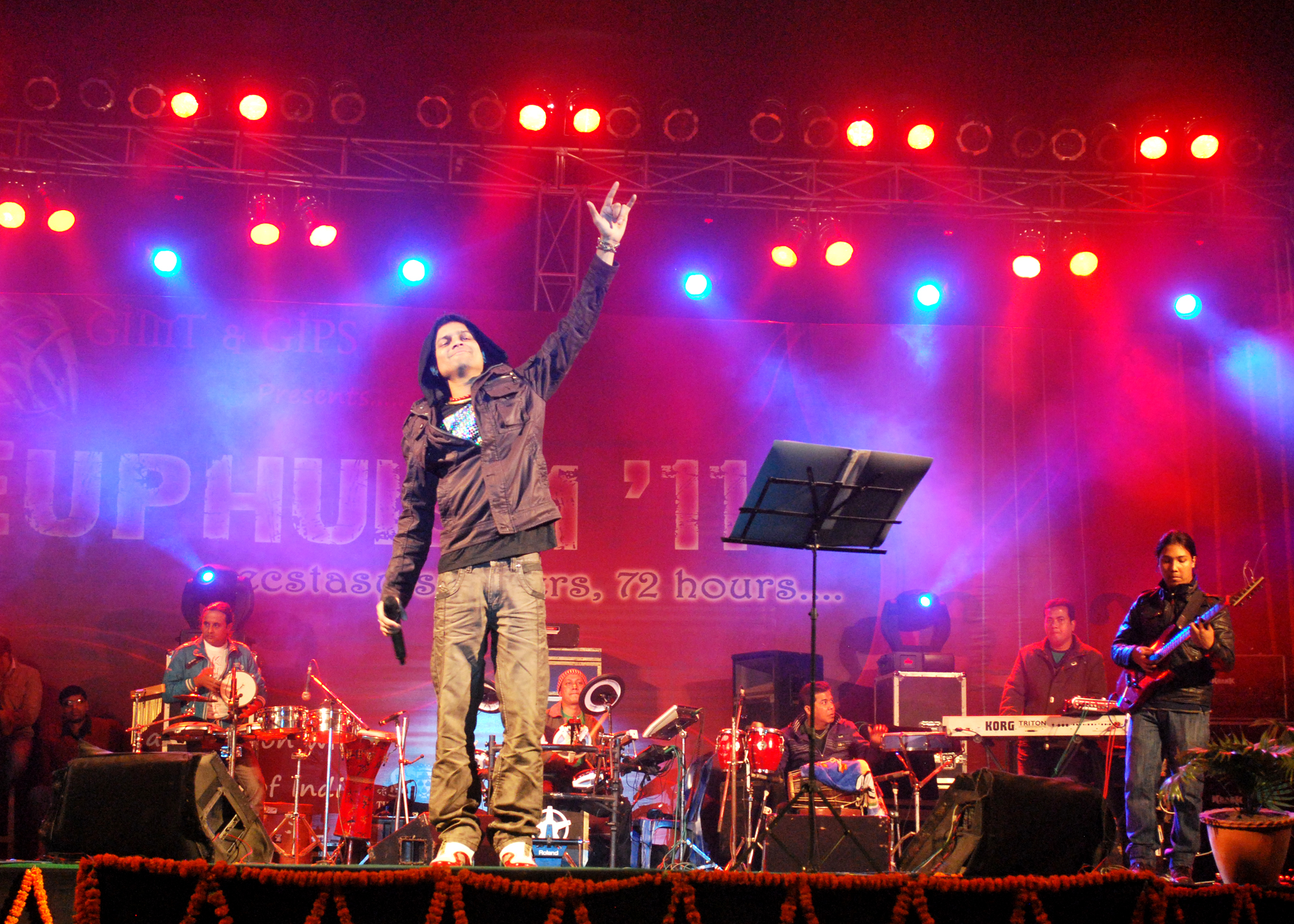
Zubeen Garg performing at a concert in 2011

Garg was a regular performer at Bihu functions and other cultural festivals across Assam, often singing not only Assamese songs but also in Hindi, Bengali, and other languages. Internationally, he has represented Assamese and Indian music abroad. Notably, he performed in Trinidad and Tobago, where he sang several of his Hindi and Assamese hits, becoming the first Assamese entertainer to headline a concert there.

Vishal Kalita of Guwahati's Hatigaon has reportedly collected an archive of over 35,000 cassettes and CDs of Garg's recordings.

=== Honorary statue ===
On 2 December 2022, a 20-foot statue was unveiled by the singer during the Nazirating Tamuli Tourism Festival in Digboi. A Bamboo bridge built across the Na Dihing river by villagers of Tengapani and named after Zubeen Garg was inaugurated by the singer at Tengapani-Thepabari on 29 February 2020.

=== Species ===
In 2026 two species were named after him: Osbeckia zubeengargiana, a flowering plant discovered in Assam, India, and Euthalia zubeengargi, a butterfly discovered in Arunachal Pradesh, India.

== Discography ==
=== As a music director ===
Assamese film

- Hiya Diya Niya (2000)
- Tumi Mur Mathu Mur (2000)
- Morome Morom Jane (2000)
- Daag (2001)
- Sesh Upahar (2001)
- Nayak (2001)
- Prem Aru Prem (2002)
- Kanyadaan (2002)
- Jonaki Mon (2002)
- Jibon Nodir Duti Par (2002)
- Agnishakshi (2003)
- Priya Milan (2003)
- Bidhata (2003)
- Juman-Suman (2003)
- Barud (2004)
- Rong (2004)
- Dinabandhu (2004)
- Adhinayak (2006)
- Aami Asomiya (2006)
- Mon Jaai (2008)
- Ekhon Nedekha Nodir Hkhipare (2012)
- Rodor Sithi (2014)
- Gane Ki Aane (2016)
- Antarin (2017)
- Mission China (2017)
- Priyar Priyo (2017)
- The Underworld (2018)
- Kanchanjangha (2019)
- Ratnakar (2019)
- Pratighat (2019)
- Dr. Bezbaruah 2 (2023)
- The Slam Book (2023)
- Raghav (2023)
- Sikar (2024)
- Bhaimon Da (2025)
- Rudra (2025)
- Joddha (2025)
- Homework (2025)
- Roi Roi Binale (2025)

Bengali Film

- Shudhu Tumi (2004)
- Mon Niye (2010)
- Kachhe Achho Tumi (2010)
- Samsara (2019)

Hindi film

- Strings – Bound By Faith (2006)
- Dil Toh Deewana Hai (2016)
- Homework (2025)

== Filmography ==
=== As an actor ===
==== Films ====
†	Denotes films that have not yet been released

Year	Film	Director	Producer	Screenwriter	Role(s)	Language
2000	Tumi Mur Matho Mur	Zubeen Garg	Debo Borkotoky	Zubeen Garg, Amulya Kakati, Pabitra Margherita	Hrishi	Assamese
2002	Prem Aru Prem				Special appearance in the song "Sokuwe Sokuwe"	Assamese
2004	Dinabandhu		Zubeen Garg		Bipul	Assamese
2006	Gangster				Special appearance in the song "Ya Ali"	Hindi
2006	Strings				Special appearance in the song "Mantra (Om)"	Hindi
2007	Big Brother				Special appearance in the song "Jag Lal Lal"	Hindi
2008	Mon Jaai	Moirangthem Moniram Singha	Moirangthem Moniram Singha, Deepankar Dutta	Moirangthem Moniram	Manab	Assamese
2011	Raamdhenu	Munin Baruah	Pride East Entertainments Pvt. Ltd.		Special appearance in the song "Tupi"	Assamese
2013	Bhal Pabo Najanilu				Indranil	Assamese
2014	Suma Porokhote				Special appearance in the song "Suma Porokhote"	Assamese
2014	Rodor Sithi	Baharul Islam	Ikramul Majid	Baharul Islam		Assamese
2015	Ahetuk	Bani Das	Raj Kumar Jain		Special appearance in the song "Ahetuk"	Assamese
2015	42.8%				Short Film	Assamese
2016	Gaane Ki Aane	Rajesh Jashpal	Rajesh Jashpal, Sunil Gogoi, Gautam Chakrabortty,	Rajesh Jashpal, Ibson Lal Baruah	Nilabh Jonak Baruah	Assamese
2016	Xat Nomboror Xondhanot				Sibu	Assamese
2017	Mission China	Zubeen Garg	Zubeen Garg	Zubeen Garg	Colonel Goswami	Assamese
2017	Tumi Aahibaane	Prerana Borboruah	Bibi Devi Borboruah, ASFFDC	Prerana Borboruah	Special appearance	Assamese
2017	Priyaar Priyo	Munin Baruah	Abdul Mannan Faruk		Priyobrot Kakoti & Bishnujyoti Bezbaruah	Assamese
2018	The Underworld	Rajesh Jashpal	SJ Studio & Entertainment Ltd.		Don	Assamese
2019	Kanchanjangha	Zubeen Garg	Zubeen Garg, Garima Saikia Garg, Shyamantak gautam	Zubeen Garg	Anirban	Assamese
2019	Pratighaat	Achinta Shankar	Narendra N Sinha, Nalini Roy Gayari		Special appearance in the song "Pratighaat"	Assamese
2022	Rajneeti – Part 1				Arindam	Assamese
2023	Dr. Bezbaruah 2				DSP Mahadev Borbarua	Assamese
2024	Wide Angle					Assamese
2024	Sikaar				Shankar	Assamese
2024	Abhimannyu				Colonel Goswami	Assamese
2025	Joddha				Special appearance in the song "Ei Mayabi Raati"	Assamese
2025	Roi Roi Binale		Zubeen Garg	Zubeen Garg	Raul	Assamese
2025	Homework †				Special appearance in the song "Jantra"	Assamese, Hindi

==== Television ====
Year	Serial(s)	Role	Language
2010–11	Anuradha	Anirudha	Assamese

==== Music videos ====
Year	Song(s)	Album(s)	Language	Music Composer	Lyrics	Co-actor(s)	Note/Ref(s)
1997	"Meghor Boron"	Mukti	Assamese	Zubeen Garg			First Assamese Music Video
1998	"Yuhi Kabhi Mila Karo"	Yuhi Kabhi	Hindi	Miko	Anant Joshi	Bhumika Chawla, Jonkey Borthakur	His First Bollywood Music Video
2007	"Zindagi Kahin Gum Hai"	Zindagi	Hindi	Alaap Dudul Saikia	Ravi Basnet		
2007	"Jia Re Jia Re	Zindagi	Hindi	Alaap Dudul Saikia	Ravi Basnet		
2007	"Mukha"	Mukha	Assamese	Zubeen Garg	Zubeen Garg		
2007	"Sweet Love"	Mukha	Assamese	Zubeen Garg	Zubeen Garg	Rimpi Das	
2007	"Baby Buli Lahekoi"	Mukha	Assamese	Zubeen Garg	Zubeen Garg		
2007	"Sadiya"	Mukha	Assamese	Zubeen Garg	Zubeen Garg		
2007	"Dusakure Nilare"	Mukha	Assamese	Zubeen Garg	Zubeen Garg	Rimpi Das	
2007	"Pamne Moi Ghurai"	Mukha	Assamese	Zubeen Garg	Zubeen Garg		
2007	"Aahe Ba Nahe"	Mukha	Assamese	Zubeen Garg	Diganta Bharati	Nishita Goswami	
2007	"Tumi Suwa Jetiya"	Mukha	Assamese	Zubeen Garg	Zubeen Garg	Gayatri Mahanta	
2007	"Maya Mathu Maya"	Mukha	Assamese	Zubeen Garg	Zubeen Garg	Rimpi Das	
2009	"Rumaal"	Rumaal	Assamese	Zubeen Garg	Zubeen Garg		
2009	"Hai Hai Hai Mari Dila"	Rumaal	Assamese	Zubeen Garg	Zubeen Garg		
2009	"Amanikha"	Rumaal	Assamese	Zubeen Garg	Zubeen Garg		
2009	"Tumi Subhash"	Rumaal	Assamese	Zubeen Garg	Zubeen Garg		
2009	"Tumar Mitha Sawoni"	Rumaal	Assamese	Zubeen Garg	Zubeen Garg	Megharanjani Medhi	
2009	"Duporot Muhanaat"	Rumaal	Assamese	Zubeen Garg	Zubeen Garg		
2012	"Runjun"	Runjun	Assamese	Zubeen Garg	Zubeen Garg		
2012	"Gaan Diyaa"	Rock	Assamese	Zubeen Garg	Zubeen Garg		This song is dedicated to Late Hiren Bhattacharya

=== As a director ===
==== Films ====
†	Denotes films that have not yet been released

Year	Film	Language	Note
2000	Tumi Mur Mathu Mur	Assamese	
2017	Mission China	Assamese	
2019	Kanchanjangha	Assamese	

=== As a producer and screenwriter ===
==== Producer ====
†	Denotes films that have not yet been released

Year	Film	Director	Language
2004	Dinabandhu		Assamese
2017	Mission China		Assamese
2019	Kanchanjangha		Assamese
2025	Roi Roi Binale		Assamese

==== Screenwriter ====
†	Denotes films that have not yet been released

Year	Film	Director	Language
2000	Tumi Mur Mathu Mur		Assamese
2017	Mission China		Assamese
2019	Kanchanjangha		Assamese
2025	Roi Roi Binale		Assamese

=== As a judge ===
Year	TV Channel	Show(s)	Language	Notes
2002	Zee TV	Sa Re Ga Ma Pa	Hindi	Guest judge
2003	Channel V	Coke V Popstar 2	Hindi	Guest judge
2004	Zee TV	Sa Re Ga Ma Pa	Hindi	Guest judge
2007–08	Zee Bangla	Sa Re Ga Ma Pa L'il Champs	Bengali	
2013	Zee Bangla	Sa Re Ga Ma Pa L'il Champs	Bengali	Guest judge
2013–14	Rengoni	Moi Zubeen Garg Hobo Bisaru	Assamese	

== Books ==
He got Seuji-Seuji award for his poetry book in 2017.

Year	Book	Publisher	Language
2009	Xabda Anubhuti		Assamese
2018	Zubeenor Podyo		Assamese
2020	Zubeenor Podyo (2^{nd} Edition)		Assamese

== Awards and honours ==
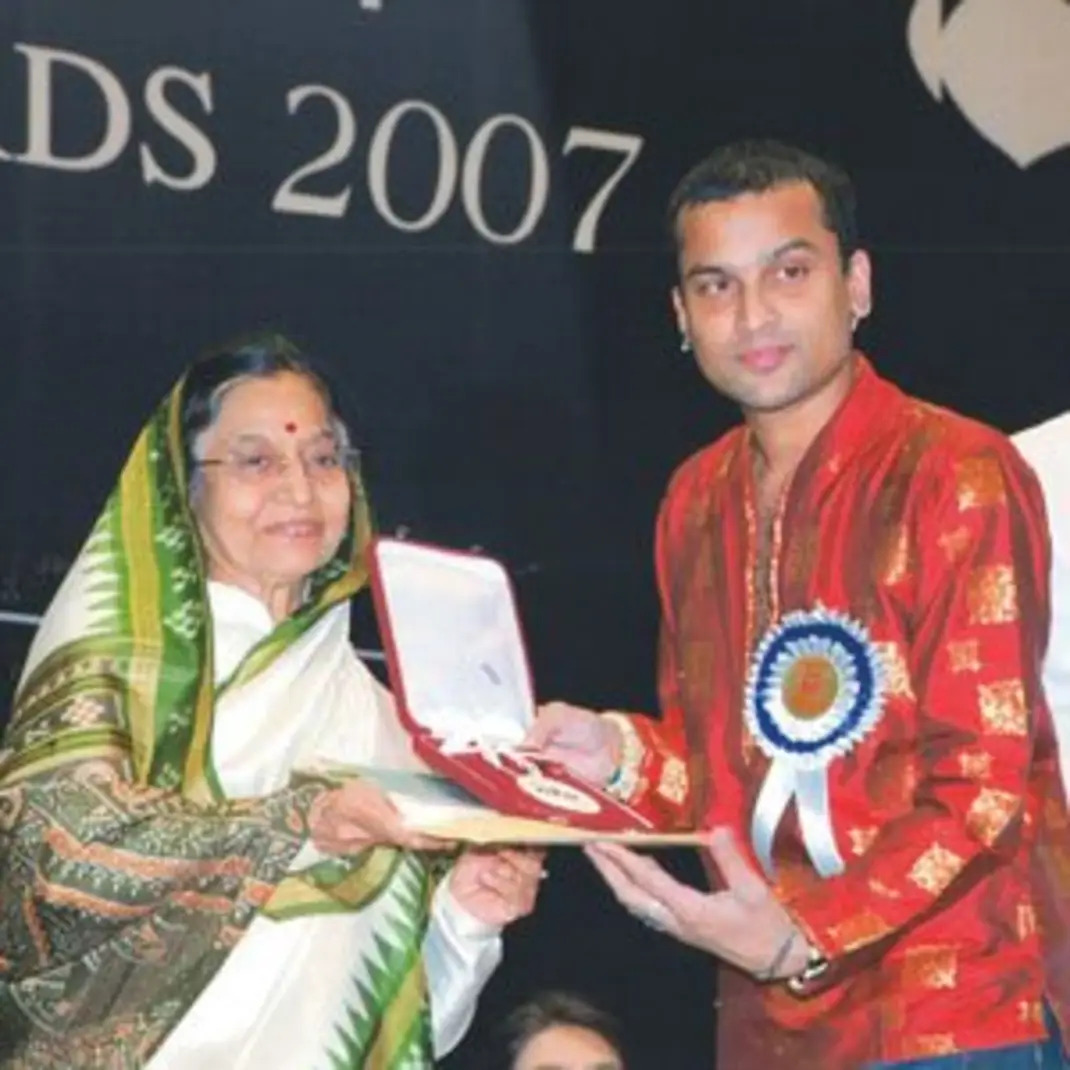
Best Music Direction Award to Mr. Zubeen Garg for Non-feature Film Echoes Of Silence, at the 55th National Film Awards, 2009.

In 1996 Garg was selected as Best Debut Indian pop album for his album "Chandni Raat" at Channel V Music Awards and Screen Awards which was nominated and lost to Daler Mehndi's album Bolo Ta Ra Ra and Suchitra Krishnamoorthi's album Dole Dole respectively.

In 2011 he was honoured as a guest artist of the year by the Assam Convention, at Oak Brook, Illinois, United States.

On 27 May 2024 he was awarded an honorary Doctor of Literature degree by the University of Science and Technology, Meghalaya.

He has also received Best Music Direction Award for Non-feature Film Echoes Of Silence, at the 55th National Film Awards, 2009.

On 9 December 2025 he was posthumously awarded an honorary Doctor of Literature (D.Litt.) degree by Cotton University which was received by his sister, Palme Borthakur.

Year	Award	Movie/Theatre/Album	Category	Result
1996	Screen Awards	Chandni Raat	Best Debut Indian Pop Album	Nominated
1996	Channel V Music Awards	Chandni Raat	Best Debut Indian Pop Album	Nominated
2005	BFJA Awards	Shudhu Tumi	Best Music Director	Won
2005	Prag Cine Awards 2005	Rong	Best Playback Singer (Male) – "Chaya Dore Thaka Tumi"	Won
2006	Global Indian Film Awards	Gangster	Best Playback Singer (Male) – "Ya Ali"	Won
2007	Filmfare Awards	Gangster	Best Playback Singer (Male) – "Ya Ali"	Nominated
2007	Zee Cine Awards	Gangster	Best Playback Singer (Male) – "Ya Ali"	Nominated
2007	IIFA Awards	Gangster	Best Playback Singer (Male) – "Ya Ali"	Nominated
2007	Stardust Awards	Gangster	New Musical Sensation (Male) – "Ya Ali"	Won
2007	Screen Awards	Gangster	Best Male Playback – "Ya Ali"	Nominated
2008	Kalakaar Award	Zindagi	Best Music Album	Won
2008	Kalakaar Award	Tumi	Best Music Album	Won
2009	55th National Film Awards	Echoes of Silence	National Film Award for Best Non-Feature Film Music Direction	Won
2011	Prag Cine Awards 2011	Jetuka Pator Dore	Best Playback Singer (Male) – "Puwar Hahit"	Nominated
2012	Prag Cine Awards 2012	Raamdhenu	Best Playback Singer (Male) – "Rang Dia Morom"	Nominated
2013	Prag Cine Awards 2013	Me and My Sister	Best Playback Singer (Male) – "Thunuk Thanak"	Nominated
2014	Prag Cine Awards 2014	Shinyor	Best Playback Singer (Male) – "Kaalor Aasur"	Nominated
2015	Prag Cine Awards 2015	Ahetuk	Best Playback Singer (Male) – "Ahetuk"	Won
2015	Prag Cine Awards 2015	Rodor Sithi	Best Music Direction	Nominated
2016	Gup-Shup Music Awards	Boliya Krishna (Hengool Treatre)	Title Song of the Year – "Boliya Krishna"	Won
2016	Gup-Shup Music Awards	Gaane Ki Aane	Best Music Composer – "Janu Janu"	Won
2017	Prag Cine Awards 2017	Gaane Ki Aane	Best Music Direction	Nominated
2017	Prag Cine Awards 2017	Gaane Ki Aane	Best Playback Singer (Male) – "Janu Janu"	Nominated
2017	Bhraymaman Mobile Theatre Awards	Kohinoor Theater	Red FM Best Playback Singer (Male) – "Janam Janam"	Won
2018	Prag Cine Awards 2018	Mission China	Best Actor (Popular)	Won
2018	Prag Cine Awards 2018	Mission China	Best Film (Popular)	Won
2018	Prag Cine Awards 2018	Mission China	Best Playback Singer (Male) – "Din Jwole Raati Jwole"	Nominated
2018	Prag Cine Awards 2018	Priyaar Priyo	Best Actor	Nominated
2018	Bhraymaman Mobile Theatre Awards	Abahan Theater	Red FM Best Playback Singer (Male) – "Oo Maa"	Won
2019	Bhraymaman Mobile Theatre Awards	Deuta (Chiranjeeb Theatre)	Red FM Best Playback Singer (Male) – "O Deuta"	Won
2021	Prag Cine Awards 2021	Kanchanjangha	Best Film (Popular)	Nominated
2021	Prag Cine Awards 2021	Kanchanjangha	Best Actor (Popular)	Won
2021	Prag Cine Awards 2021	Kanchanjangha	Best Playback Singer (Male) – "Panchana"	Won
2021	Prag Cine Awards 2021	Ratnakar	Best Music Director	Won
2021	Prag Cine Awards 2021	Ratnakar	Best Lyrics – "Rati Rati"	Nominated
2021	Prag Cine Awards 2021	Pratighaat	Best Music Director	Nominated
2021	Prag Cine Awards 2021	Bornodi Bhotiai	Best Playback Singer (Male) – "Bornodi Bhotiai"	Nominated
2022	Prag Cine Awards 2022	The Firing range	Best Singer Male (2020)	Nominated
2022	Prag Cine Awards 2022	Chandrawali	Best Singer Male (2021)	Nominated
2023	8th Assam State Film Awards	Kanchanjangha	Best Playback Singer (Male) – "Panchana"	Won
2023	Rajasthan Film Festival (In other regional films)	Dr. Bezbaruah 2	Best Singer Male – "Ki Naam Di Maatim"	Nominated
2023	Rajasthan Film Festival (In other regional films)	Dr. Bezbaruah 2	Best Music Director – "Ki Naam Di Maatim"	Nominated
2023	Rajasthan Film Festival (In other regional films)	Dr. Bezbaruah 2	Best Supporting Character	Won
2024	Filmfare Awards Assamese	The Slam Book	Best Music Album	Won
2025	Bhupen Hazarika Awards	Conferred by Beltola Bohagi Utsav Committee. Presented by Kavita Baruah, younger sister of Bhupen Hazarika.	Lifetime Achievement Award	Conferred
2026	Filmfare Awards Assamese	He was posthumously awarded the Lifetime Achievement Award in recognition of his unparalleled contribution to music and cinema.	Lifetime Achievement Award	Won
2026	Filmfare Awards Assamese	Roi Roi Binale	Special Recognition Award	Won
2026	Filmfare Awards Assamese	Rudra	Best Playback Singer (Male) – "Agoli Anubhabe"	Won
