= Dhing =

- Village
- Dhing Village
- Location in Assam, India Dhing (India)
- Coordinates: 26.47°N 92.47°E
- Country: India
- State: Assam
- District: Nagaon
- Elevation: 64 m (210 ft)

Population (2011)
  - Total: 19,235

Languages
  - Official: Assamese.
- Time zone: UTC+5:30 (IST)
- PIN: 782123

Dhing is a village in the northwest of the Nagaon district in the state of Assam, India.

== Geography ==
Dhing is located at 26.47°N 92.47°E. It has an average elevation of 64 meters (210 feet).

Dhing is approximately 25 kilometers from the city of Nagaon.

== Demographics ==
In the 2011 India census, Dhing had a population of 19,235. Males constituted 51.7% of the population and females 48.3%. Dhing had an average literacy rate of 87.35%, higher than the state average of 72.19%. Male literacy is 90.77% and female literacy is 83.69%.

== Politics ==
The Communist leader M. Shamsul Huda was elected several times to the Assam Legislative Assembly as the member for the Dhing legislative assembly constituency. Dhing is part of the Kaliabor (Lok Sabha constituency).

Dhing constituency is currently represented by an All India United Democratic Front politician, Aminul Islam, who has won the last two Assam Legislative Assembly elections in 2011 and 2016.

== Education ==
Dhing serves as an educational hub for surrounding villages and services multiple secondary schools. It also provides post-secondary education with Dhing College, which is affiliated with Gauhati University.

== Notable people ==
- Hima Das, first Indian woman to win a gold medal at the IAAF World Under-20 Athletics Championships
- Mufti Khairul Islam, Ex Amir-e-Shariat of North East India
- Ratnakanta Borkakati, Assamese poet
- Rajdweep, lyricist, playwright, screenwriter, and journalist

== Crimes ==
On August 22, 2024, in Dhing, Assam's Nagaon district, an alleged gang rape incident happened with a 14-year-old girl. The victim, a class 10 student, was returning home from her tuition classes around 7 pm when she was attacked by three men near Dhing town. The girl was found lying in a semi-conscious state near a pond about an hour later and was immediately rushed to the Nagaon Civil Hospital for medical treatment.

== See also ==
- Dhing Express, nickname for Hima Das
