= Nipon Goswami =

Indian actor (1942–2022)

- Born: 3 September 1942; Kolibari, Tezpur, Darrang district, Assam Province, British India
- Died: 27 October 2022 (aged 80); Guwahati, Assam, India
- Education: FTII Pune
- Occupation: Actor
- Notable work: Dr. Bezbarua
- Children: 1

Nipon Goswami (3 September 1942 – 27 October 2022) was an Indian actor and theatre artist associated with Assamese-language films. He was one of the veteran actors of Assamese Film Industry. He started his acting career as a stage actor and later established himself as a film actor. His most notable for his work in the 1969 film Dr. Bezbarua as well as Piyoli Phukan, Tumi Aahibaane and Aparoopa.

== Personal life ==
Goswami was born on 3 September 1942 at Kolibari in Tezpur, Assam. His father Chandradhar Goswami was an actor and his mother Nirupama Goswami was a singer. He did his primary schooling at Kolibari LP School. After that, he moved to Tezpur Govt. HS School. He died after suffering from heart-related ailments on 27 October 2022, at the age of 80.

== Acting career ==
A graduate of Film and Television Institute of India, Pune, Goswami debuted in the Assamese film industry as a child artist in the film Piyoli Phukan, directed by Phani Sarma in 1957. As a lead actor, Sangram was his first Assamese film and a hit movie. His next film Dr. Bezbaruah released in 1969 brought him recognition as a star to act in many movies in the coming years. He also acted in a few Hindi films as a character actor. Goswami was actively involved in mobile theatres, notably, Abaahan, Kohinoor, Hengul, and Shakuntala. He also appeared in few television serials like Writu Aahe Writu Jaai.

In his later years he acted in multiple films including Tumi Aahibaane, Underworld and Dr. Bezbaruah 2.

== Filmography ==
=== Assamese ===
Year	Film	Director	Notes
1957	Piyoli Phukan	Phani Sarma	Debut Film
1968	Sangram	Amar Pathak	
1970	Dr. Bezbaruah	Brajen Barua	
1970	Mukuta	Brajen Barua	
1971	Maanab Aru Daanab	Indukalpa Hazarika	
1972	Morisika	Amulya Manna	
1973	Ganesh	AK Films Unit	
1974	Brishti	Deuti Baruah	
1974	Bohagor Duporia	Jones Mahalia	
1977	Sandhya Raag	Bhabendra Nath Saikia	
1979	Duranir Rong	Jones Mahalia	
1980	Ajoli Nabou	Nip Baruah	
1957	Maak aru Morom	Nip Baruah	
1982	Aparoopa	Jahnu Barua	
1983	Ghar Sangsar	Sivaprasad Thakur	
1983	Kokadeuta Naati Aru Haati	Nip Baruah	
1983	Nayanmani	Suprabha Devi	
1984	Jibon Surabhi	Naresh Kumar	
1984	Shakuntala Aru Sankar Joseph Ali	Nip Baruah	
1985	Deep Jyoti	Prodyot Bose	
1986	Aaroti	Ashim Das	
1986	Protidaan	Dara Ahmed	
1988	Siraj	Bhupen Hazarika	
1988	Aai Mor Janame Janame	Nip Baruah	
1995	Hridoyor Aree Aree	Jadav Chandra Das	
1999	Bukur Majot Jowle	Ashok Kumar Bishaya	
1997	Deutar Biya	Deepak Bhuyan	
1999	Baibhav	Manju Borah	
2000	Hiya Diya Niya	Munin Barua	
2000	Tumi Mur Matho Mur	Zubeen Garg	
2000	Jon Jwole Kopalat	Munna Ahmed	
2000	Jugantoror Tejal Puwa	Johns Moholia	
2002	Priya O Priya	Anjan Kalita	
2002	Prem Aru Prem	Sambhu Gupta	
2002	Jonaki Mon	Jibanraj Barman	
2002	Kokadeutar Ghar Jowai	Suman Haripriya	
2002	Mitha Mitha Logonot	Achyut Kumar Bhagawati Sushanta Majindar Baruah ||	
2003	Jumon Sumon	Mohibul Haque	
2003	Priya Milon	Munna Ahmed	
2004	Kadambari	Bani Das	
2004	Antaheen Jatra	Munna Ahmed	
2006	Aghari Aatma	Munna Ahmed	
2009	Jeevan Baator Logori	Timothy Das Hanche	
2011	Poley Poley Urey Mon	Timothy Das Hanche	
2012	Borolar Ghor	Mani C. Kappan	
2013	Mahasamar	Johns Mohaliya	
2014	Jilmil Jonak	Sibanan Boruah	
2015	Morisika	Nipon Dholua	
2016	Gaane Ki Aane	Rajesh Jashpal	
2017	Tumi Aahibane	Prerana Barbarooah	Played three roles.
2017	Sesh Angikar	Pranay Phukan	
2018	The Underworld	Rajesh Jashpal	
2022	Lankakanda	Rajani Barman	Last film before his death
2023	Dr. Bezbaruah 2	Nipon Goswami	Posthumous Film

=== Hindi ===
Year	Film	Director
	Mouka	
1968	Do Bhai	Brij Sadanah
1975	Jaggu	Samir Ganguly
1976	Do Anjaane	Dulal Guha
1992	Virodhi	Rajkumar Kohli
1997	Kaal Sandhya	Bhabendra Nath Saikia
2001	Daman	Kalpana Lajmi
2014	18.11 - A Code of Secrecy	Mohibul Haque
2017	Purab Ki Awaaz	Chandra Mudoi
