= Lajmi =

Lajmi is a surname. Notable people with the surname include:

- Semir Lajmi (1989-present) , Tunisian Artist
- Kalpana Lajmi (1954–2018), Indian film director
- Lalita Lajmi (1932–2023), Indian painter
