= Gaja Gamini =

- Directed by: M. F. Husain
- Written by: Kamna Chandra; M. F. Husain
- Produced by: Rakesh Nath
- Starring: Madhuri Dixit; Shabana Azmi; Inder Kumar; Naseeruddin Shah
- Cinematography: Ashok Mehta
- Edited by: Waman Bhosle; Virendra Gharse
- Music by: Bhupen Hazarika
- Distributed by: Yash Raj Films
- Release date: 1 December 2000
- Running time: 122 minutes
- Country: India
- Language: Hindi

Gaja Gamini (English: Woman with an elephant's walk) is a 2000 Indian film written and directed by M. F. Husain. The film stars Madhuri Dixit, in the lead role. The film was released on 1 December 2000 and was a box office failure.

== Plot ==
The central figure of the film is represented by a mysterious figure called "Gaja Gamini", who inspires, arouses, and confuses the common man. "Gaja Gamini" is the inspiration behind Leonardo da Vinci's 'Mona Lisa', Kalidas' poem "Shakuntala", and a photojournalist named Shahrukh's photographs. The mysterious "Gaja Gamini" appears as four characters, one of them being Sangeeta, a blind girl from Banaras at the beginning of time, who inspires village women to revolt against a male-dominated system and carve a niche for women forever. Another character is Shakuntala, who is the subject of Kalidas' poem of the same name. Shakuntala incites jealousy in the women and love in the men around her, charming humans and animals alike in the forests of Kerala. "Gaja Gamini" is also Mona Lisa during the Renaissance, the object of painter Leonardo da Vinci's obsession. Finally, Monika, the most confusing sector of the film, is supposed to represent the woman of the New Millennium. Kamdev, the God of Love, walks the earth throughout history, attempting to win the love of "Gaja Gamini".

Thrown into this mix is a large black wall, separating two different periods, and confrontations between science and art at different points in history, showing that the world itself can change, but its original ideas will always be the same. For example, a play by Shakespeare written and performed by actors in the 15th century will still be performed in the 21st century, but with different actors. The confrontations between art and science also bring about the idea that while science is firmly set on believing that which can only be proved, the basis for art is that which can be proved and an intuitive sense that can be felt. Science uses the brain, while art uses the brain and the heart. Another facet of the film is a "gathri," a small bundle which a woman carries upon her head, like a burden, with which she must walk forever.

== Cast ==
- Madhuri Dixit as Gaja Gamini / Sangeeta / Shakuntala / Monika / Mona Lisa
- Naseeruddin Shah as Leonardo da Vinci
- Shabana Azmi as Premchand's Nirmala
- Shilpa Shirodkar as Sindhu
- Inder Kumar as Kamdev
- Tej Sapru as Tansen
- Farida Jalal as Noorbibi
- Mohan Agashe as Kalidasa
- Ashish Vidyarthi as Scientist
- Kalpana Pandit as Abhisarika
- Raisa Husain as Phulvania
- Alihassan Turabi as Bhola
- Rashida Siddiqui as Nawab Begum
- Sunita Kumar as Raj Mata
- M.F. Hussain as Painter
- Shahrukh Khan as himself (cameo appearance)

== Soundtrack ==
Gaja Gamini

Soundtrack album by Bhupen Hazarika
- Released: 1 January 2000 (India)
- Genre: Film soundtrack
- Label: Saregama
- Producer: Bhupen Hazarika

Bhupen Hazarika chronology
| Daman: A Victim of Marital Violence (2001) | Gaja Gamini (2000) | Darmiyan (1997) |

Hussain approached A. R. Rahman to compose the music for the film, but due to time constraints, he had to turn down the offer. The music was composed by Bhupen Hazarika, and the background score, composed by Anuradha Pal, was uniquely the first-ever to be created entirely on the Tabla and Voice.

| Song | Singer(s) | Lyricist |
|---|---|---|
| "Gaja Gamini" | Bhupen Hazarika | Maya Govind |
| "Meri Payal Bole" | Kavita Krishnamurthy | Maya Govind |
| "Hamara Hansa Gaya Videsh" | Kavita Krishnamurthy | Maya Govind |
| "Shloka – Part 1" | Suman Devgan | Kalidas |
| "Shloka – Part 2" | Suman Devgan | Kalidas |
| "Yeh Gathri Taj Ki Tarah" | M. F. Hussain | M. F. Hussain |
| "Do Sadiyon Ke Sangam" | Udit Narayan, Kavita Krishnamurthy | Javed Akhtar |
| "Deepak Raag" | Shankar Mahadevan | Maya Govind |
| "Protest March" | Instrumental | |
| "Yeh Gathri Taj Ki Tarah" | Kavita Krishnamurthy | M. F. Hussain |

== Reception ==
Sumnan Tarafdar of Filmfare gave a positive review of the film, calling it "not something that comes along every day". Taran Adarsh said "The film has a very colourful look, with the visuals being eye-catching. But as a director, Hussain fails to convey his thoughts on celluloid. On the whole, Gaja Gamini is an artistic film which will not be understood by any strata of an audience – classes or masses. Business-wise, the film is sure to spell disaster. A waste of precious celluloid."
