= Shakuntala (1961 film) =

1961 film by Bhupen Hazarika

- Film poster
- Directed by: Bhupen Hazarika
- Produced by: Kamrup Chitra
- Starring: Amala Katarki; Phani Sarma; Tara; Kulada Kumar Bhattacharya
- Music by: Bhupen Hazarika
- Production company: Kamrup Chitra
- Release date: November 24, 1961
- Country: India
- Language: Assamese

Shakuntala is a 1961 Indian Assamese language musical film directed by Bhupen Hazarika, who also composed its music. It is based on the story of Shakuntala from Hindu mythology. The film starred Amala Katarki, Phani Sarma, and Tara. It was released on 24 November 1961. It was the first Assamese film to include colour sequences.

== Production ==
Shakuntala was produced under the banner of Kamrup Chitra. It was Hazarika's second film as director after Era Bator Sur (1956). Several songs in the film were sung by Hazarika himself, alongside playback singers including Shamshad Begum. Colour sequences were used in parts of the film. The rest of the film was shot in black and white.

== Reception ==
Shakuntala won the President's Silver Medal for Best Feature Film in Assamese at the 9th National Film Awards in 1962. It was considered to be as one of Hazarika's most significant films and was a commercially and critically successful on release.
