= Anuradha Pal =

Indian tabla player

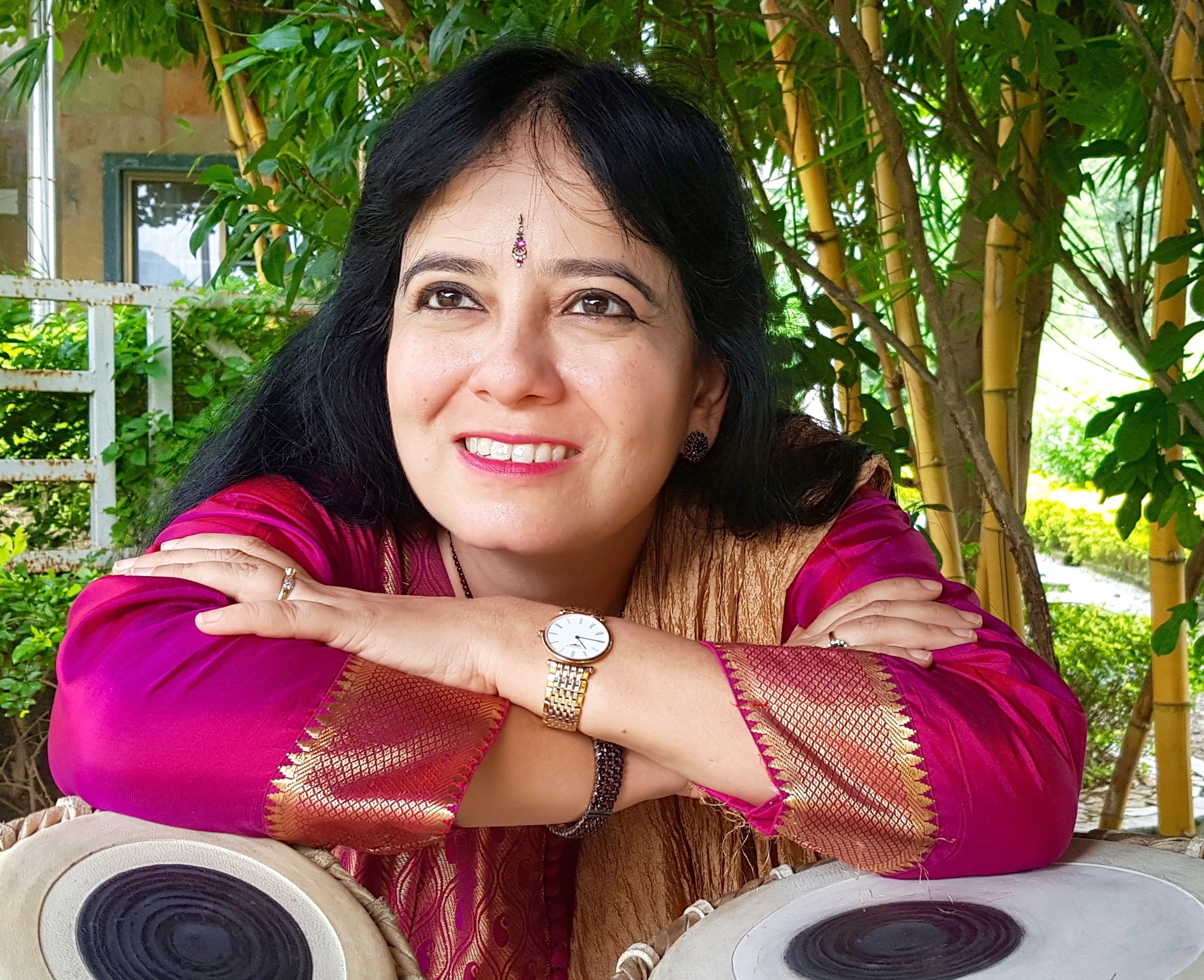

Background information
- Genres: Hindustani classical music, World music
- Occupations: Musician, composer
- Instrument: Tabla
- Label: Sur aaur Saaz
- Website: www.anuradhapal.com

Anuradha Pal is an Indian tabla player and composer who performs Indian classical music. She is the founder of Stree Shakti, an all-female classical music ensemble established in 1996.

== Early life ==
Pal trained on the tabla under Ustad Alla Rakha and Ustad Zakir Hussain, both of whom were associated with the Punjab Gharana playing technique.

== Career ==
Pal began accompanying Hindustani and Carnatic classical vocalists, instrumentalists, and dancers at age 13. By age 15, she was performing alongside her teachers.

Pal composed and performed the background score for M. F. Husain’s film Gaja Gamini, released in 2000.

In 2018, she led a large tabla ensemble in a tribute to her former teacher, Ustad Alla Rakha. That year, she received the First Ladies Award by the Ministry of Women and Child Development.

She has given workshops and lecture-demonstrations at institutions including Harvard University, Berklee College of Music, the Massachusetts Institute of Technology (MIT), the Vienna Boys' Choir, Palazzo Ducale (Italy), Milap Fest (U.K.), and Monash University (Australia). In 2006, she served as an artist-in-residence at the New England Conservatory of Music.

She represented India at the Asian Performers Summit in Japan in 1999 and has performed at SAARC and CHOGM summits. She organized the Aatmanirbhar Kala Ke Sangh Music Festival in January 2021, and performed at the Dior Fall 2023 show at the Gateway of India in Mumbai.

== Compositions and collaborations ==
Pal founded Stree Shakti on International Women's Day in 1996 as an all-female Hindustani–Carnatic instrumental ensemble. The group has collaborated with female musicians and performed at international music festivals. In 2002, they toured the UK and Ireland with the Pan-African Orchestra from Ghana.

In 2023, she launched the Anuradha Pal Collective, intended to "blend collective ideas and musical philosophies" in an Indian context.

In 2023 and 2024, Pal presented narrative tabla concert formats, including “Anuradha’s Tablas Sing Stories”. She also performed “Ramayana on Tabla Sings Stories”.

== Social work ==
=== Contribution to female empowerment ===
Since 1996, Pal has promoted and supported female musicians through her band, Stree Shakti. She has performed at institutions including Sri Agrasen Kanya PG College (Varanasi), Rebel Girls Interactive (Delhi), and Ruia College (Mumbai).

In March 2018, she wrote the lyrics to “Khud Ko Tu Pehchaan De” and composed the anthem for the Ministry of Women and Child Development’s Nari Shakti campaign.

During the COVID-19 pandemic, Pal organized relief initiatives and fundraising performances in support of communities and artists. She has cited activity across several locations in India.

On the International Day of the Girl Child in 2020, Pal established the Padmashri M. T. Vyas Stree Shakti Award to encourage young girls pursuing Indian music or dance to engage in social service.

=== Anuradha Pal Cultural Foundation (APCF) ===
The Anuradha Pal Cultural Foundation (APCF) is a non-profit organization focused on music education and cultural programs; Pal also advocates musical and rhythmic meditation.

== Media recognition ==
Pal has been mentioned in books and media highlighting women achievers and musicians, including the children’s book The Dot That Went for a Walk (2019), Torchbearers of Indian Classical Music (2017), Women of Pure Wonder (2016), and the PBS film Adventure Divas (2001).

== Personal life ==
Pal is based in Mumbai, where she conducts percussion classes through the Anuradha Pal Cultural Academy (APCA Mumbai), located in Juhu.

== Discography ==
Anuradha Pal has released music albums and instructional DVDs through her independent label, Sur aaur Saaz, encompassing classical, fusion, and educational works.

Albums
Title	Release year	Details
Sheer Magic (Live)	2000	Live collaboration with Shahid Parvez
Passion – Anuradha Pal's Stree Shakti	2000	Performances by Stree Shakti
Nirvana: Spiritual Bliss	2003	
A Tabla Solo by Anuradha Pal	2005	Solo tabla performance album
Kesaria – Romancing Rajasthan	2006	With Samanda Manganiar
Get Recharged!!!	2013	Mix of Indian and jazz music
Recharge Plus	2014	
Sensational (Live)	2016	Second live collaboration with Shahid Parvez
Taaleem	2022	Tabla solos

Singles (selection)
Title	Release year	Details
Anuradha Pal's Stree Shakti Anthem (For Female Empowerment)	2019	
Taal Tiranga	2022	
Tabla Tonic	2023	
