= Piyoli Phukan =

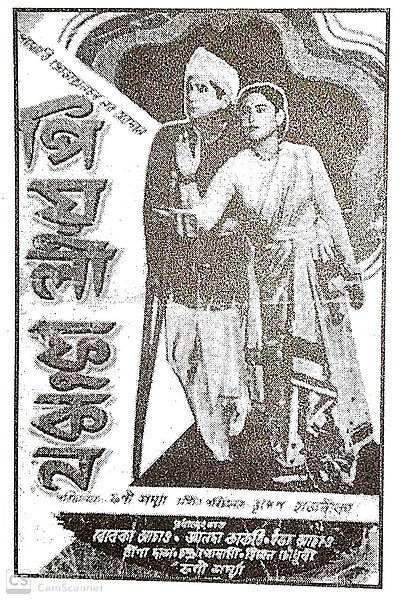
- Directed by: Phani Sarma
- Written by: Phani Sarma
- Screenplay by: Phani Sarma
- Produced by: Gama Prasad Agarwalla (Rupjyoti Productions)
- Starring: Phani Sarma; Chandradhar Goswami; Gyanada Kakati
- Cinematography: Subodh Banerjee
- Edited by: Kamal Ganguli
- Music by: Bhupen Hazarika
- Release date: 2 December 1955
- Running time: 75 minutes
- Country: India
- Language: Assamese

Piyoli Phukan is a black & white Assamese language film directed by Phani Sarma, released in 1955. The film is based on the life and struggle of a historical character of Assam, Piyoli Phukan, son of Badan Borphukan, who revolted against British occupation. He was sentenced to death and hanged in 1830 at Jorhat. The film is produced by Gama Prasad Agarwalla under the banner of Rupjyoti Productions, Tezpur, Assam. Music is composed by Bhupen Hazarika. Piyoli Phukan is the first Assamese film, which got national recognition. The film was honoured by the Certificate of Merit in State Awards, 1956.

== Plot ==
Piyoli Phukan was the son of Badan Borphukan. Badan is considered as a traitor in Assam History. He brought Mansena (Burmese Army) to Assam to destroy his motherland. At first the British came to save Assamese people from the Burmese, but after the Treaty of Yandabo in 1826, they occupied Assam. There was massive protest against the British occupation of Assam. The film depicts vividly how Piyoli along with Gomdhar Konwar revolted against the British colonizers. He organized people to revolt against the British. Accordingly, he plotted for a massive armed attack on the British. But the British smelt the conspiracy and just before execution of the plan, Piyoli Phukan was arrested on the ground of hatching a plot against the British. Eventually Piyoli was sentenced to death and hanged July 26, 1830 after a trial.

== Cast ==
- Phani Sarma (Gomdhar Konwar)
- Chandradhar Goswami (Piyoli Phukan)
- Eva Asao (Padumi)
- Gyanada Kakati (Seuti)
- Rebeka Asao (Mrs. Borphuan)
- Tulsi Das (Miuram)
- Bhupen Baruah (Bharat)
- Durga Goswami (Colonel Cooper)
- Bibek Agarwalla (Captain)
- Ramesh Sarma (Haranath)
- Hiren Choudhury
- Neimuddin
- Bina Das
- Dulal Goswami
- Nipon Goswami (child artist)
