= Daman (2001 film) =

2001 film by Kalpana Lajmi

Daman: A Victim of Marital Violence
- Movie poster
- Directed by: Kalpana Lajmi
- Written by: Kalpana Lajmi
- Produced by: Hrishikesh Mukherjee; N. C. Sippy
- Starring: Raveena Tandon; Sayaji Shinde; Sanjay Suri; Raima Sen; Bharti Jaffrey; Shaan
- Cinematography: Jatinder Sharma; Bijoice Verghese
- Edited by: Anirban
- Music by: Bhupen Hazarika
- Distributed by: National Film Development Corporation of India; Ministry of Health and Family Welfare
- Release date: 4 May 2001
- Country: India
- Language: Hindi

Daman: A Victim of Marital Violence is a 2001 Indian Hindi-language drama film directed by Kalpana Lajmi released on 4 May 2001. The lead actress, Raveena Tandon, won the National Film Award for Best Actress for her role as Durga Saikia. The film follows the story of a battered wife. The film was distributed by Ministry of Health and Family Welfare. It marked the debut of singer Shaan as an actor.

== Plot ==
The Saikia family is an extremely wealthy family in Assam. The two sons of the family are Sanjay and Sunil Saikia. The latter is the kinder of the two, while the former is very hot-tempered and has occasional mood swings. The parents decide to get him married to Durga, a lower-caste girl from a poor family, thinking she will be able to cope with Sanjay's temper. Sanjay initially refuses to marry Durga, but when his mother threatens to cut him off from the family will, he relents. Thus, Durga marries Sanjay and looks forward to her new life. From day one, Durga is subjected to physical and mental harm by her husband. To add insult to injury, he spends their wedding night with a sex worker called Chameli. Durga continues to be tortured by her husband, and after a drunken night, he rapes her.

Soon Durga is pregnant, but Sanjay is convinced the child is not his but Sunil's. Durga gives birth to a girl named Deepa, but this only disappoints Sanjay, and he shuns the child. Sanjay decides to get Deepa, now twelve years old, married to a much older man. When Durga protests, he viciously beats her. Durga's only companion, Sunil, is killed by Sanjay after he suspects that he and Durga were having an affair. Durga is devastated by Sunil's death and decides that enough is enough. She runs away with Deepa and decides to cut all ties with Sanjay. Sanjay files a police complaint but is unsuccessful in finding the two. Durga carries on with her life, but it's not long before Sanjay finds the two. Eventually, Durga kills her husband.

== Cast ==
- Raveena Tandon as Durga Saikia
- Sayaji Shinde as Sanjay Saikia
- Sanjay Suri as Sunil Saikia
- Raima Sen as Deepa Saikia
- Nipon Goswami
- Bharti Jaffrey
- Indra Bania
- Moloya Goswami
- Shaan as Kaushik Nath

== Music ==
Daman

Soundtrack album by Bhupen Hazarika
- Released: 16 December 2000 (Audio Cassette); 1 January 2001 (Audio CD)
- Genre: Feature film soundtrack
- Label: Universal Music Group India

Bhupen Hazarika chronology
Gaja Gamini (2000)	Daman (2000)	Kyon (2003)

1. "Gum Sum Nisha Aayi (Female)" - Kavita Krishnamurthy
2. "Jai Bhagawathi" - Jaspinder Narula
3. "Gum Sum Nisha Aayi" - Bhupen Hazarika
4. "Hu Hu Pagal" - Kavita Krishnamurthy, Bhupen Hazarika
5. "Sun Sun Goriya Kya Bole Teraa Kangana" - Alka Yagnik
6. "Sar Sar Hawa, Jisne Badan Chhua Hai" - Hema Sardesai
7. "Bahar Hi Bahar Hai, Fiza Me Bhi Khumar Hai" - Shaan, Dominique Cerejo

== Reception ==
Aparajita Saha od Rediff.com wrote, "Director Kalpana Lajmi's intentions are noble, but their execution leaves much to be desired." Taran Adarsh of IndiaFM gave the film one out of five, writing, "On the whole, DAMAN is a poorly scripted film with just Raveena Tandon's performance as the sole saving grace."
