= Anuj Sawhney =

Indian Bollywood actor (born 1981)

- Born: New Delhi, India
- Occupations: Actor; dancer; dubbing artist
- Years active: 2003–2010

Anuj Sawhney (born 25 February 1981) is a former Indian actor. He is currently the Managing Director of Swiss Military Consumer Products, a company listed on the Bombay Stock Exchange.

== Business Leadership ==
As Managing Director of Swiss Military India, Anuj Sawhney has overseen the brand's expansion from a corporate gifting-focused business into a broader consumer lifestyle and travel gear brand. Industry publications have cited his emphasis on product innovation, retail growth, domestic manufacturing, and affordable premium positioning in the Indian market.Businessworld

== Filmography ==
Year	Film	Role	Notes
2003	Nayee Padosan	Raju	
2003	Fun2shh... Dudes in the 10th Century	Ajay a.k.a. Ajju	
2005	Naina	Dr. Samir Patel	
2006	Chingaari	Chandan Mishra a.k.a. Daak Babu (Postman)	
2006	Tom, Dick and Harry	Deepak a.k.a. Dick	
2007	Life Mein Kabhie Kabhiee	Mohit Agarwal	
2009	3 Nights 4 Days	Rahul	
