= Chingaari =

- Directed by: Kalpana Lajmi
- Written by: Bhupen Hazarika; Kalpana Lajmi
- Produced by: Kalpana Lajmi; Vikas Sahni
- Starring: Mithun Chakraborty; Sushmita Sen; Anuj Sawhney
- Cinematography: Vishal Sinha
- Edited by: Zafar Sultan
- Music by: Aadesh Shrivastava
- Release date: 17 February 2006
- Country: India
- Language: Hindi

Chingaari (English: Spark) is a 2006 Indian Hindi-language drama film directed by Kalpana Lajmi. The film is based on the novel, The Prostitute and the Postman by Bhupen Hazarika. This was the fourth to star Mithun Chakraborty in a negative role after Jallad (1995), Elaan and Classic Dance of Love (2005).

The film is a commentary on the abuse of power and in particular discusses the injustices of the priests in India. Beneath the love triangle between the main characters, there is an age-old story that shows that not even "holy men" are exempt from the corruption of power. Later it was dubbed in Tamil as Peyar Sandhya Thozil Dhasi

== Plot ==
Basanti (Sushmita Sen) is a prostitute with a child, Titali, working with Ila Arun. Chandan (Anuj Sawhney) is a newly recruited postman. Upon his arrival in the village, he is moved by Basanti's sufferings. The third part of the love triangle is Bhuvan Panda (Mithun Chakraborty), the village priest of the goddess, Kali. He thinks of himself as a god and bends religion as per his will. In the movie, the priest follows some of the aghori rituals and is one of Basanti's regular customers. Bhuvan Panda has a fetish for sadism. Meanwhile, Chandan befriends Titali and Basanti and it is here that Basanti discloses that she wants a better life for her daughter, Titali.

Chandan falls in love with Basanti and promises to give her and Titali a better life. The priest does not approve of the marriage, for obvious reasons. Bhuvan Panda plans to kill Basanti. Chandan tries to stop him and is killed. As this is happening, Basanti awaits her lover at the altar. When he does not arrive, Basanti leaves broken-hearted. In her despair, Basanti returns to her life of prostitution.

When the news of what happened to Chandan reaches Basanti, she and all the villagers attack the temple. In a climactic confrontation between the prostitute and the priest, Bhuvan Panda is killed at the hands of Basanti. The story ends with Basanti avenging the death of her lover.

== Cast ==
- Mithun Chakraborty as Bhuvan Panda
- Sushmita Sen as Basanti
- Anuj Sawhney as Chandan
- Ravi Gossain as Chintu
- Jhumma Mitra as Rupali
- Ila Arun as Padmavati
- Aanjjan Srivastav as Narainda

== Music ==
1. "Bichwa Javani Ka Dank Mare" (Male) - Aadesh Shrivastava
2. "Maha Kali Jai Durge" - Sunidhi Chauhan
3. "Bana Ley Dulhan Dulhan" - Vijeta Pandit
4. "Bichwa Javanee Kaa Dank Mare" - Sunidhi Chauhan
5. "Jab Jab Saiyyan" - Himani Kapoor
6. "Kitnee Sardee Kitnee Garmee" - Aadesh Srivastava
7. "Kitni Sardi Kitni Garmi Kitni Barkha Gujar Gayi" - Vijeta Pandit
8. "Maha Kali Jai Durge" (Male) - Aadesh Shrivastava
9. "Taandav" - Aadesh Shrivastava
