= Indramalati =

- Screenshot
- Directed by: Jyotiprasad Agarwala
- Written by: Jyotiprasad Agarwala
- Produced by: Jyotiprasad Agarwala
- Starring: Manabhiram Barua; Raseswari Barua
- Cinematography: Jyotiprasad Agarwala
- Edited by: Jyotiprasad Agarwala
- Music by: Jyotiprasad Agarwala
- Distributed by: Chitralekha Movietone
- Release date: 1939
- Country: India
- Language: Assamese

Indramalati is a 1939 film directed by the Assamese poet Jyotiprasad Agarwala.

== Background ==
Director Jyotiprasad faced a major financial crisis after his first film Joymoti (1935) failed commercially. He spent more than Rs 50,000 and was in debt in the late 1930s; he was fortunate to gather together just Rs 15,000 to make his dream of making a second film come true. Desperately seeking to compensate the loss he incurred in the making of Joymoti, he began shooting Indramalati in late 1937. This time, however, he did not use his Chitraban Studio for the outdoor shoot. Instead, he chose the 'Talbari' of his family, at Harigaon, two kilometres from Tezpur Mission Chariali. Within seven days, Jyotiprasad completed the outdoor shooting for the picture with the camera often kept at a fixed point as the sets and artistes kept changing the angles. The film used over 15,000 feet of reel.

On its release in 1939, the film was relatively successful, earning in excess of Joymati, aiding Jyotiprasad to go on to direct other films afterwards.

== Story ==
Jyotiprasad Agarwala wrote the story of Indramalati, which was a tale of romance. The name of the hero was Indrajit while Malati was the name of the heroine. Significantly, Jyotiprasad was the first filmmaker to introduce the style of movie-making of using the names of the lead pair.

The role of the hero was played by Manoviram Baruah while Raseswari Baruah (Hazarika) was cast as Malati. Acclaimed theatre actor Phani Sarma was again drafted in to play one of the significant roles, that of Indrajit's friend. Even great Assamese musician Dr Bhupen Hazarika acted in the film and sang "Biswa Bijoyee Navajowan" at only age 13. Unlike casting for his first film, Jyotiprasad faced comparatively less trouble in finding actors for Indramalati.

There were only nine major roles in Indramalati. Besides Manoviram Barua and Raseswari Baruah, the others were Phani Sarma, Thanuram Bora, Lalit Mohan Choudhury, Khargeswar Agarwalla, Kashi Saikia, Bedananda Sarma and Bhupen Hazarika. Other actors who were in the film included the Rupkonwar himself, Jnanaviram Barua, Mani Lahiri, etc.

== Filming and production ==
After the casting and seven-day outdoor shoot, the eight-member film unit left for Kolkata where they would shoot for the indoor locations. Sets were built in Arora Studio, Narkeldanga, where all the indoor shooting was done. An amazingly short three-day shooting schedule at Arora Studio was followed by the artistes, working hard round the clock.

Indramalati was produced once again under the banner of ‘Chitralekha Movietone and was very much a solo effort in that Jyotiprasad Agarwalla was the director, screenwriter, lyricist, music director, art director, costume designer and editor.

No artistes of Indramalati, like Joymoti, took remuneration. They even participated in the shooting wearing their own clothes. In some scenes, the costumes fail to maintain continuity.

== See also ==
- Joymati (1935)
