= Darmiyaan: In Between =

- Directed by: Kalpana Lajmi
- Written by: Saagar Gupta
- Starring: Kiron Kher; Arif Zakaria; Tabu
- Cinematography: Santosh Sivan
- Music by: Bhupen Hazarika
- Release date: 1997
- Language: Hindi

Darmiyaan: In Between is a 1997 Indian film starring Kiron Kher, Arif Zakaria and Tabu. The film is set in Bollywood of the 1940s and tells the story of an actress who discovers that her son is a eunuch. Hindustani vocalist, Rita Ganguly, has appeared in the film. Shahrukh Khan was originally slated to play the role of intersex, finally essayed by Arif Zakaria.

== Cast ==
- Kiron Kher as Zeenat Begum
- Arif Zakaria as Immi
- Tabu as Chitra
- Shahbaaz Khan
- Sayaji Shinde

== Soundtrack ==
No.	Title	Singer(s)
1	"Pighalta Hua Ye Sama"	Asha Bhosle, Udit Narayan
2	"Babu Darogaji"	Sapna Awasthi, Bhupen Hazarika
3	"Duniya Parayi Log Yaha Begane"	Bhupen Hazarika
4	"Mai Juari Hu"	Asha Bhosle
5	"Nadiya Pe Lehre Lehro Pe Naiya"	Asha Bhosle
6	"Shina Gore Hazy Hazy Bobling"	Sudesh Bhosale, Asha Bhosle
7	"Dekh Lu Jo Nazar Bhar Ke"	Asha Bhosle
8	"Sa Ra Ra Ra Ra"	Sudesh Bhosale, Asha Bhosle

== Reception ==
Madhu Jain of India Today wrote ″Unlike the title, there is nothing in between about this film. It hits you in the face like a backhand slap - albeit a bejewelled and manicured to glossy perfection hand. Lajmi has trespassed into an area where brave directors have feared to tread: the world of hijras, up close and personal.″
