= Sumita S. Chakravarty =

Indian-American media studies scholar

- Education: University of Illinois Urbana-Champaign (PhD in Communications); University of Lucknow (PhD in English); University of Lucknow (BA)
- Occupations: Professor, author
- Writing career
- Subjects: Migration; Digital culture; Globalization; Cinema; Nationalism; Media history
- Website: m2lab.net

Sumita S. Chakravarty is a media studies scholar known for her research on media theory, migration and globalization, Indian popular cinema and national identity, digital culture, and the history and philosophy of media technologies. At The New School in New York City, Chakravarty was the founding chair of the Culture and Media department at the Eugene Lang College of Liberal Arts from 2000 to 2008, and later the Associate Dean of Media Studies from 2011 to 2014. She is currently Professor Emeritus at the School of Media Studies in The New School.

Chakravarty leads the Media+Migration Lab (M2Lab), an online platform dedicated to interdisciplinary projects studying the connections between migration and its mediation. The platform's foundational project is Migration Mapping, a living digital archive for media and migration.

Chakravarty is the author of the book National Identity in Indian Popular Cinema, 1947–1987 (University of Texas Press, 1993; Oxford University Press, 1996) and editor for The Enemy Within: The Films of Mrinal Sen (Flicks Books, 2000). She has also written numerous articles for academic journals and anthologies, such as "Migrationmapping" in Uncertain Archives: Critical Keywords for Big Data (MIT Press, 2021).

== Early life and education ==
Chakravarty holds dual PhDs in Communications from the University of Illinois Urbana-Champaign, and English from Lucknow University, India. She was a doctoral student at the University of Illinois in the early 1980s, then having recently moved from India. James W. Carey, the Dean of the Institute and the College of Communications at Illinois, was her thesis advisor. She holds a BA from Lucknow University, India.

== Work ==
In 1994, Chakravarty's book, National Identity in Indian Popular Cinema, 1947–1987, was published. The book provides an early academic account of popular cinema from India, examining its shifts across developments in Indian nationhood. It draws upon discourses from film studies, cultural studies, postcolonialism, and "Third World" Cinema to explore Bombay cinema post-Independence. Chakravarty writes about films such as Guide (dir. Vijay Anand, 1965), Shree 420 (dir. Raj Kapoor, 1955), and Bhumika (dir. Shyam Benegal, 1977) to develop the concept of "imperso-nation," with ideas of disguise characterizing the representation of national identity in popular films to neutralize class, communal, and regional differences. The book explores topics such as realist aesthetics and the representation of women in chapters such as "National Identity and the Realist Aesthetic" and "Woman and the Burden of Postcoloniality: The Courtesan Film Genre"

Chakravarty's work is often cited or drawn upon in various academic discussions around Indian cultural history and cinema. She is identified by Florian Stadtler, lecturer of literature and migration, as "[o]ne of the first critics to note the intricate relationship between the novel and [Indian popular] cinema" Gayathri Prabhu and Nikhil Govind note the "skilled and detailed thematic reading" that Chakravarty offers of films such as Sujata (dir. Bimal Roy, 1959).

Chakravarty later edited the book The Enemy Within: The Films of Mrinal Sen, published in 2000. The book critically explores the work of Mrinal Sen, an Indian director known for social and political critique through his films. Rather than approaching Sen's work through the framework of the auteur or personal biography, the contributions in the book highlight various aspects of his cinema practice in context, broadly exploring the relationships between radicalism, cinema, and social change.

Chakravarty was the founding chair of the Culture and Media department at The New School's Eugene Lang College of Liberal Arts from 2000 to 2008, and later the Associate Dean of Media Studies from 2011 to 2014 for The New School.

In 2016, Chakravarty launched the Migration Mapping project, a website that archives and examines various media forms representing migration as human practice. The website is a continually growing archive, resource guide, and research hub on the relationship between migration and media. Migration Mapping became the foundational project of the Media+Migration Lab (M2Lab), launched later in 2018 by Chakravarty. M2Lab is an online platform that hosts experimental digital projects studying the connections between migration and media. The lab is run by student researchers and fellows who lead the lab together with Chakravarty. She established The Bishwanath and Sandhya Sinha Memorial Endowed Fellowship in her parents' memory, awarded yearly to a graduate student in media studies at The New School.

Chakravarty received the Distinguished University Teaching Award at The New School in 2018. She is currently Professor Emeritus at the School of Media Studies in The New School.

More recent writing includes the chapter "Migrationmapping" in Uncertain Archives: Critical Keywords for Big Data (MIT Press, 2021). The chapter has been described in the LSE Review of Books as offering a "critical and literary genealogy of mapping practices," prompting ways of thinking about how maps shape understandings of migration in the current digital age.

== Awards ==
Sumita Chakravarty was awarded the Distinguished University Teaching Award at The New School in 2018. She has also been awarded Faculty Development Grants and the Provost's Office Faculty Research Fund Award from The New School.

== Selected publications and writing ==
=== Books ===
- Chakravarty, Sumita S., ed. (2000). The Enemy Within: The Films of Mrinal Sen. Trowbridge: Flicks Books. ISBN 978-0-948911-45-3.
- Chakravarty, Sumita S. (1994). National Identity in Indian Popular Cinema, 1947–1987 (1st ed.). Austin, TX: University of Texas Press. ISBN 978-0292711563.

=== Book chapters and journal articles ===
- Chakravarty, Sumita S. (2021). "Migrationmapping". In Thylstrup, Nanna Bonde; Agostinho, Daniela; Ring, Annie; D'Ignazio, Catherine; Veel, Kristin (eds.). Uncertain Archives: Critical Keywords for Big Data. Cambridge, MA; London, UK: MIT Press. ISBN 9780262539883.
- Chakravarty, Sumita S. (2016). "Gender in Transit: Framing the Cinema of Migration". In Kaplan, E. Ann; Petro, Patrice; Jelaca, Dijana; Hole, Kristin (eds.). The Routledge Companion to Cinema and Gender. London; New York: Routledge. ISBN 978-1138924956.
- Chakravarty, Sumita S. (2013). "Globalization". In Danesi, Marcel (ed.). Encyclopedia of Media and Communication. Toronto: University of Toronto Press. ISBN 9781442643147.
- Chakravarty, Sumita S. (Summer 2011). "Reflections on the Body Beautiful in Indian Popular Culture". Social Research. 78 (2): 395–416. doi:10.1353/sor.2011.0024 – via Project MUSE.
- Chakravarty, Sumita S. (Summer 2009). "Cultural Studies Legacies: Visiting James Carey's Border Country". Cultural Studies ↔ Critical Methodologies. 9 (3): 395–416. doi:10.1177/1532708609332412 – via Sage Journals.
- Chakravarty, Sumita S. (2005). "Fragmenting the Nation: Images of Terrorism in Indian Popular Cinema". In Slocum, J. David Slocum (ed.). Terrorism, Media, Liberation. New Brunswick, NJ: Rutgers University Press. ISBN 978-0813536071.
- Chakravarty, Sumita S. (2003). "The Erotics of History: Gender and Transgression in New Asian Cinemas". In Dissanayake, Wimal; Guneratne, Anthony (eds.). Rethinking Third World Cinema. London; New York: Routledge. ISBN 978-1138924956.
