= Bhupen Hazarika =

Indian singer (1926–2011)

- ভূপেন হাজৰিকা
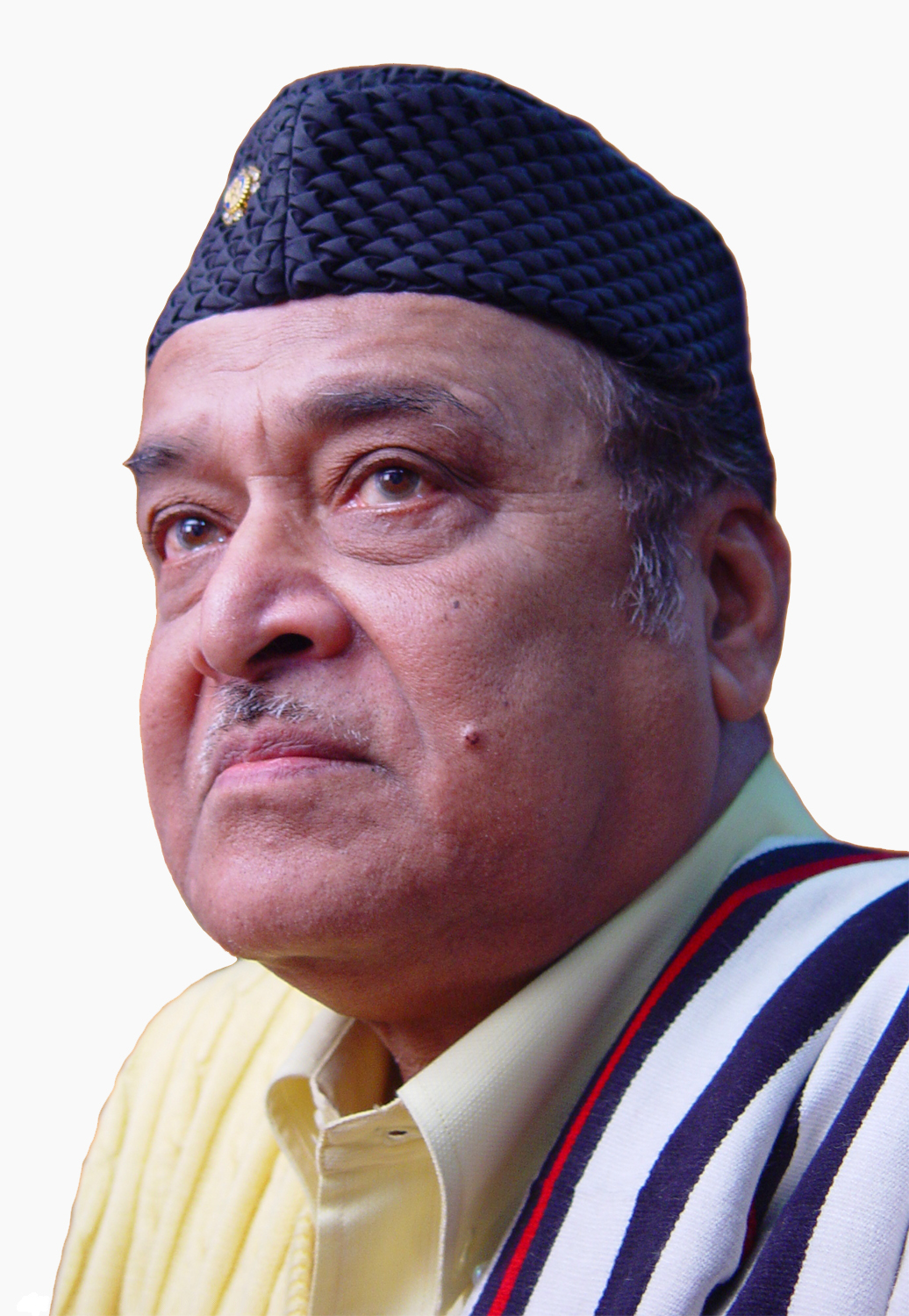
- Hazarika in November 2011
- Pronunciation: [bʱupɛn ɦazɔɹika]
- Born: Bhupendra Kumar Hazarika; 8 September 1926; Sadiya, Assam Province, British India
- Died: 5 November 2011 (aged 85); Kokilaben Dhirubhai Ambani Hospital, Mumbai, Maharashtra, India
- Monuments: Dr. Bhupen Hazarika Samannay Tirtha, Guwahati
- Other names: Sudhākanṭha; Bard of Brahmaputra
- Occupations: Singer-songwriter; composer; music director; filmmaker; lyricist; poet; politician; progressive writer
- Years active: 1939–2010
- Works: Filmography; discography; bibliography
- Political party: Bharatiya Janata Party (2004–2011)
- Movement: Indian People's Theater Association
- Spouse: Priyamvada Patel (m. 1950; div. 1963)
- Children: 1
- Relatives: Sudakshina Sarma (sister); Jayanta Hazarika (brother); Samar Hazarika (brother); Mayukh Hazarika (nephew)
- Awards: Padma Shri (1977); Dadasaheb Phalke Award (1992); Padma Bhushan (2001); Sangeet Natak Akademi Fellowship (2008); Assam Ratna (2009); Friends of Liberation War Honour (2011); Padma Vibhushan (2012, posthumously); Bharat Ratna (2019, posthumously)

Member of Assam Legislative Assembly
- In office 1967–1972
- Preceded by: constituency established
- Succeeded by: Lila Kanta Das
- Constituency: Naoboicha

Academic background
- Education: Cotton College (Intermediate, 1942); Banaras Hindu University (BA, 1944; MA, 1946); Columbia University (PhD, 1952)
- Thesis: Proposals for preparing India's basic educators to use audio-visual techniques in adult education (1952)

Academic work
- Discipline: Political science; mass communication
- Website: bhupenhazarika.com

Śagor Śoṅgome Śam̐tar Keṭechi Koto (So Many Times I Have Swum in the Ocean)
Bengali version of a famous song by Dr. Bhupen Hazarika, translated from the original Assamese to Bengali by Pulak Bandyopadhyay.

Bhupendra Kumar Hazarika (Note: Assamese: ভূপেন্দ্ৰ কুমাৰ হাজৰিকা, Assamese pronunciation: [bʱupɛndɹɔ kumaɹ ɦazɔɹika].) (8 September 1926 – 5 November 2011), widely known as Bhupen Hazarika (Note: Assamese: ভূপেন হাজৰিকা, pronounced [bʱupɛn ɦazɔɹika]; also popularly known by the titles Sudhākanṭha (Assamese: সুধাকণ্ঠ, pronounced [xudʱakɔntʰɔ]) and the Bard of Brahmaputra.) (Assamese: ভূপেন হাজৰিকা, pronounced [bʱupɛn ɦazɔɹika]), was an Indian singer, songwriter, writer, filmmaker and politician from Assam. He wrote songs mainly in the Assamese language, which are marked by humanity and universal brotherhood. His songs have been translated into many languages, most notably in Bengali and Hindi.

His songs, based on the themes of communal amity, universal justice and empathy, are especially popular among the people of Assam, West Bengal and Bangladesh. He is also acknowledged to have introduced the culture and folk music of Assam and Northeast India to Hindi cinema at the national level. He received the National Film Award for Best Music Direction in 1975, the Sangeet Natak Akademi Award (1987), Padma Shri (1977) and Padma Bhushan (2001), Dada Saheb Phalke Award (1992), the highest award for cinema in India and Sangeet Natak Akademi Fellowship (2008), the highest award of the Sangeet Natak Akademi. He was posthumously awarded both the Padma Vibhushan, India's second-highest civilian award, in 2012, and the Bharat Ratna, India's highest civilian award, in 2019. Hazarika also held the position of the Chairman of the Sangeet Natak Akademi from December 1998 to December 2003.

== Biography ==
=== Early life ===
Bhupen Hazarika born on 8 September 1926 to Nilakanta and Shantipriya Hazarika in Sadiya, an interior town of Assam on the bank of river Brahmaputra. His father was originally from Nazira, a town located in Sivasagar district. The eldest of ten children, Bhupen Hazarika (as well as his siblings) was exposed to the musical influence of his mother, who exposed him to lullabies and traditional Music of Assam. His father moved to the Bharalumukh region of Guwahati in 1929, in search of better prospects, where Bhupen Hazarika spent his early childhood. In 1932, his father further moved to Dhubri, and in 1935 to Tezpur. It was in Tezpur that Bhupen Hazarika, then 10-years-of-age, was discovered by Jyotiprasad Agarwala, the noted Assamese lyricist, playwright and the first Assamese filmmaker, and Bishnu Prasad Rabha, renowned Assamese artist and revolutionary poet, where he sang a Borgeet (the traditional classical Assamese devotional songs written by Srimanta Sankardeva and Sri Sri Madhabdeva), taught by his mother at a public function. In 1936, Bhupen Hazarika accompanied them to Kolkata where he recorded his first song at the Aurora Studio for the Selona Company. His association with the icons of Assamese culture at Tezpur was the beginning of his artistic growth and credentials. Subsequently, Hazarika sang two songs in Agarwala's film Indramalati (1939): Kaxote Kolosi Loi and Biswo Bijoyi Naujawan at the age of 12. A revolutionary zeal was rooted during his childhood. Its expression was, no doubt, "Agnijugar firingathi mai" (I am the spark of the age of fire) which was written at 14 years of his age and he was well on his way to becoming a lyricist, composer and singer.

=== Education and career ===
Hazarika studied at Sonaram High School at Guwahati, Dhubri Government High School and matriculated from Tezpur High School in 1940. He completed his Intermediate Arts from Cotton College in 1942, and his BA (1944) and MA (1946) in Political Science from Banaras Hindu University. For a brief period, he worked at All India Radio, Guwahati when he won a scholarship from Columbia University and set sail for New York in 1949. There he earned a PhD (1952) on his thesis "Proposals for Preparing India's Basic Education to use Audio-Visual Techniques in Adult Education". In New York, Bhupen Hazarika befriended Paul Robeson, a prominent civil rights activist, who influenced him. He used music as the "instrument of social change" following the path of Paul Robeson who once told him about his guitar – "Guitar is not a musical instrument, it is a social instrument." His song Bistirno Parore which is based on the tune, imagery and theme of Robeson's Ol' Man River. This song is translated in various Indian languages, including Bengali and Hindi and sung by the artist himself, and is still popular. Being inspired from some other foreign ones, he also composed several other songs in Indian languages. He was exposed to the Spiritual, and the multi-lingual version of We are in the Same Boat Brother became a regular feature in his stage performance. At Columbia University, he met Priyamvada Patel, whom he married in 1950. Tez Hazarika, their only child, was born in 1952, and he returned to India in 1953.

His famous Assamese songs include:

1. Bistirṇo Parore (বিস্তীৰ্ণ পাৰৰে)
2. Moi Eṭi Jajabor (মই এটি যাযাবৰ)
3. Goṇga Mür Ma (গঙ্গা মোৰ মা)
4. Bimurto Mür Nixaṭi Jen (বিমূৰ্ত মোৰ নিশাটি যেন)
5. Manuhe Manuhor Babé (মানুহে মানুহৰ বাবে)
6. Snehe Amar Xoto Śrawonor (স্নেহে আমাৰ শত শ্ৰাৱণৰ)
7. Gupute Gupute Kiman Khelim (গুপুতে গুপুতে কিমান খেলিম)
8. Buku Hom Hom Kore (বুকু হম্‌ হম্‌ কৰে)
9. Xagor Xoṅgomot (সাগৰ সংগমত)
10. Shillongore Godhuli (শ্বিলঙৰে গধূলি)

=== IPTA years ===
Hazarika began close association with the leftist Indian People's Theatre Association soon after returning from the US in 1953 and became the Secretary of the Reception Committee of the Third All Assam Conference of IPTA, held in Guwahati in 1955.

=== Professional life ===
After completing his MA, he briefly worked at the All India Radio station at Guwahati before embarking for his doctoral studies at Columbia University. Soon after completing his education, he became a teacher at the Guwahati University. But after a few years, he left the job and went to Kolkata where he established himself as a successful music director and singer. During that period, Hazarika made several award-winning Assamese films such as Shakuntala, Pratidhwani etc. and composed evergreen music for many Assamese films. He was also considered as a new trend setter in Bengali music. Bhupen Hazarika composed music for films from Bangladesh to which got international acclaim. He was elected the President of the Asam Sahitya Sabha in 1993. In 1967, Hazarika got elected as a member of Assam Assembly from Naoboicha constituency.

Social Struggle

From early in his life, he was at the forefront of a social battle against the entrenched forces of casteism that sneered at a member of the Kaibarta community making it as a musician of note and kept him away from the upper-caste Brahmin woman he had loved. Eventually, when the spirited Hazarika did marry, it was to a Brahmin woman, his revenge of sorts against a caste-ridden society.

=== Later life ===
He was introduced to Kalpana Lajmi in the early 1970s by his childhood friend and India's top tea planter Hemendra Prasad Barooah in Kolkata. Her first feature film Ek Pal with music score by Hazarika was produced by Barooah. Subsequently, Lajmi began assisting him professionally and personally till the end of his life. In the period after the release of Ek Pal (1986) until his death, Bhupen Hazarika mainly concentrated on Hindi films, most of which were directed by Kalpana Lajmi. Ek Pal (1986), Rudaali (1993) and Daman: A Victim of Marital Violence (2001) are major films of this period. Many of his earlier songs were re-written in Hindi and used as played-back songs in these films. These songs tried to cater to the Hindi film milieu and their social activist lyrics were browbeaten into the lowest common denominator. He served as an MLA (Independent) during 1967–72 in the Assam Legislative Assembly from Naoboicha Constituency. He contested as a Bharatiya Janata Party candidate in the 2004 Lok Sabha elections from the Guwahati constituency, persuaded by Chandan Mitra via Kalpana Lajmi which he lost to the Indian National Congress candidate Kirip Chaliha.

=== Death ===
Hazarika was hospitalized in the intensive care unit of Kokilaben Dhirubhai Ambani Hospital and Medical Research Institute in Mumbai on 30 June 2011. He remained there for the rest of his life, and died of multi-organ failure on 5 November 2011. His body lay in state at Judges Field in Guwahati and cremated on 9 November 2011 near the Brahmaputra river in a plot of land donated by Gauhati University. His funeral was attended by an estimated half a million people.

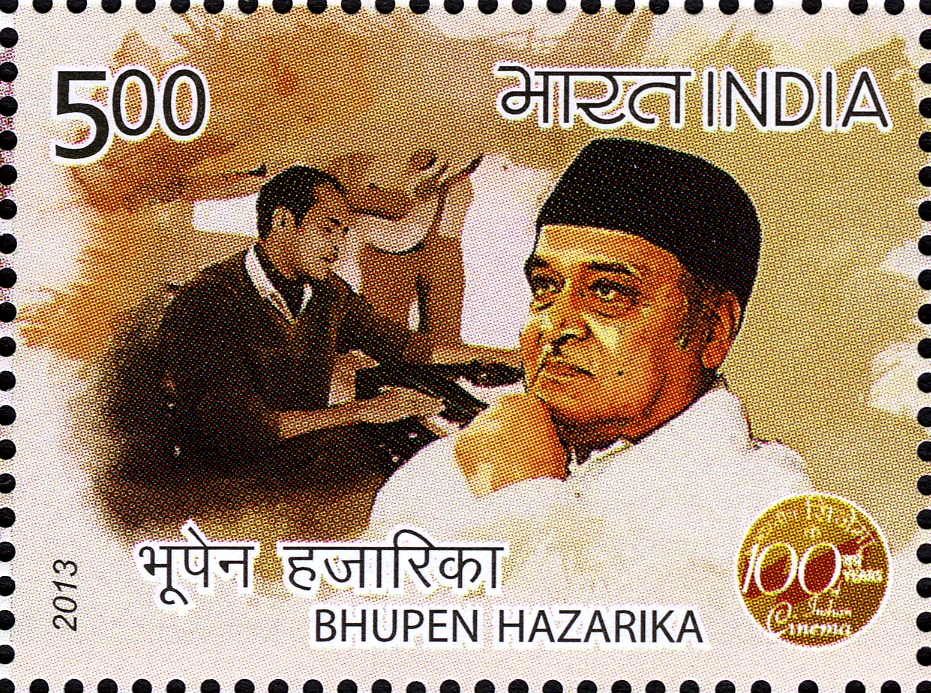
An Indian Postal Stamp commemorating Dr. Bhupen Hazarika

== Legacy and influences ==
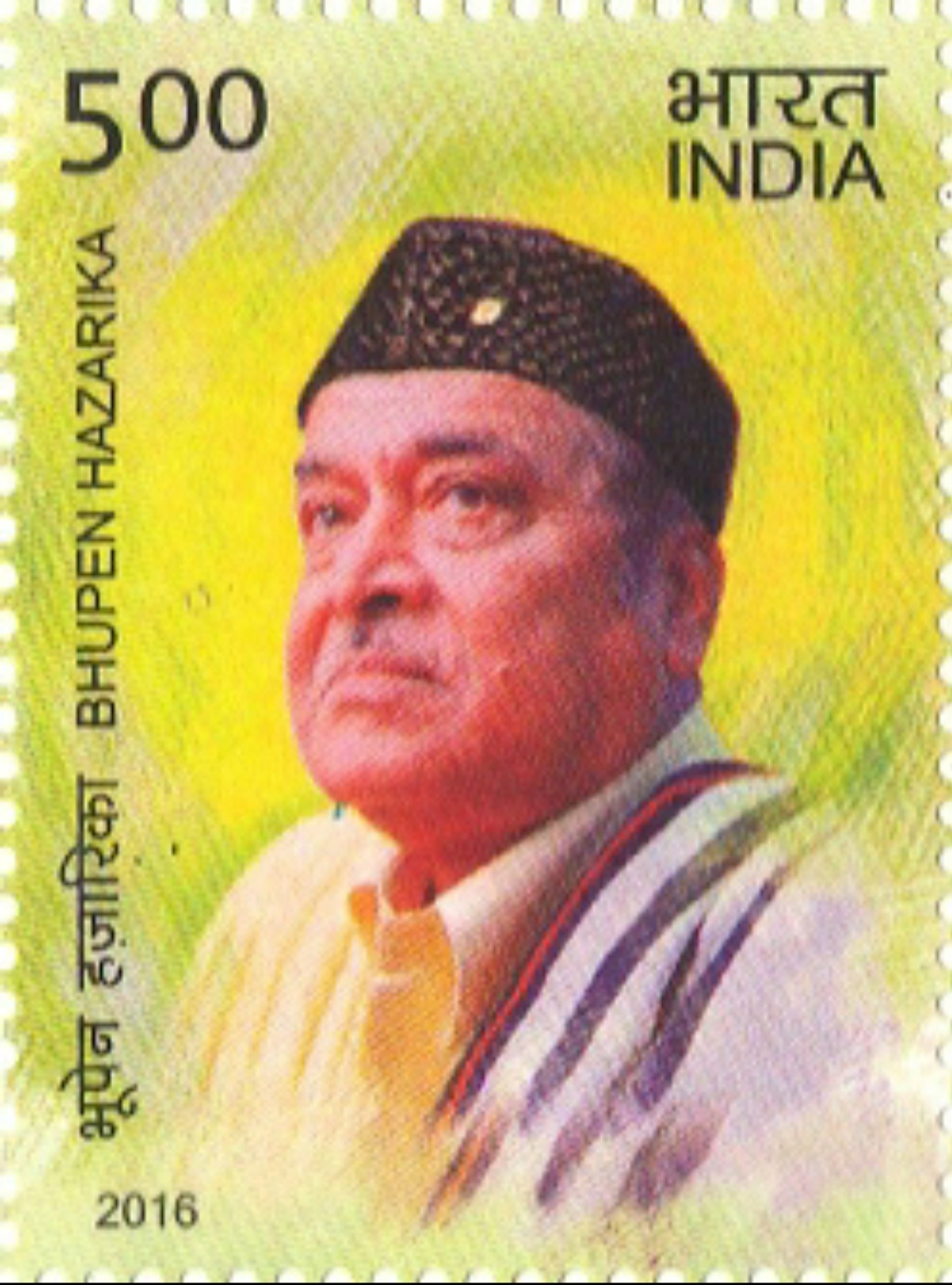
Bhupen Hazarika stamp of 2016.

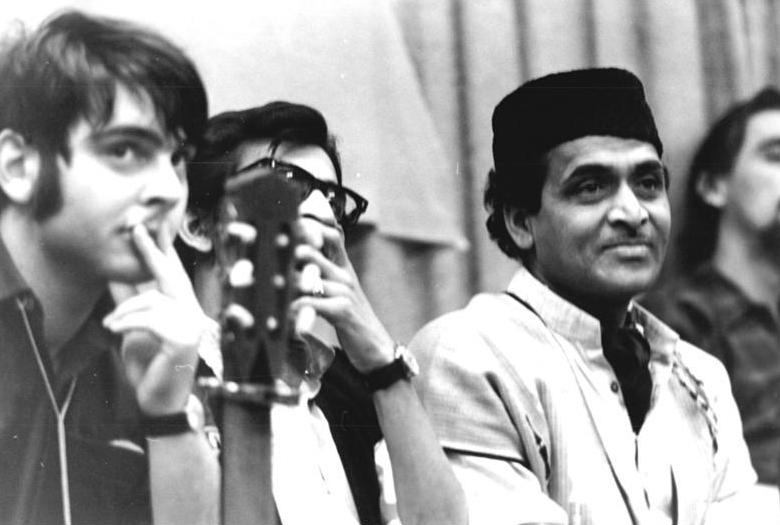
Hazarika (right) and Hartmut König (left) at the Berlin Festival of Political Songs in 1972

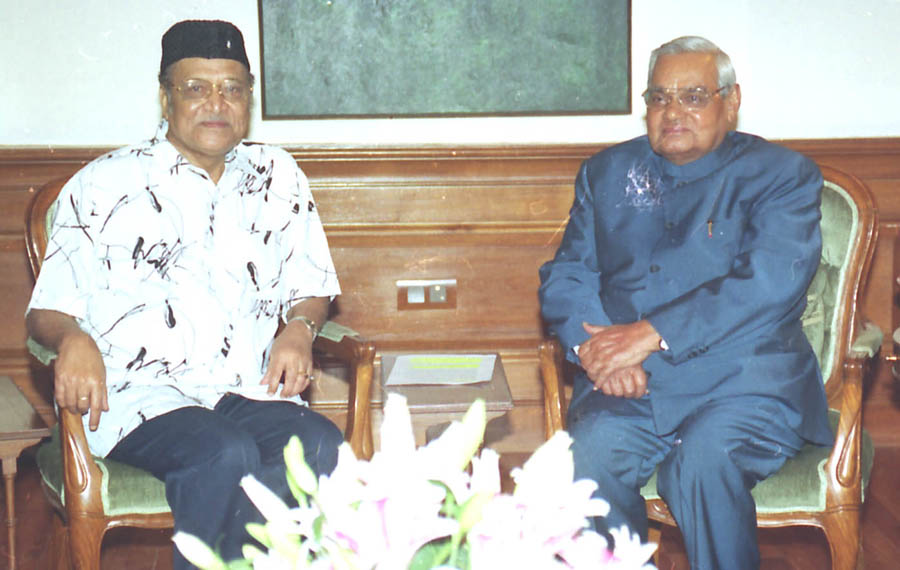
Bhupen Hazarika meets the Prime Minister Shri Atal Bihari Vajpayee in New Delhi on 27 February 2004

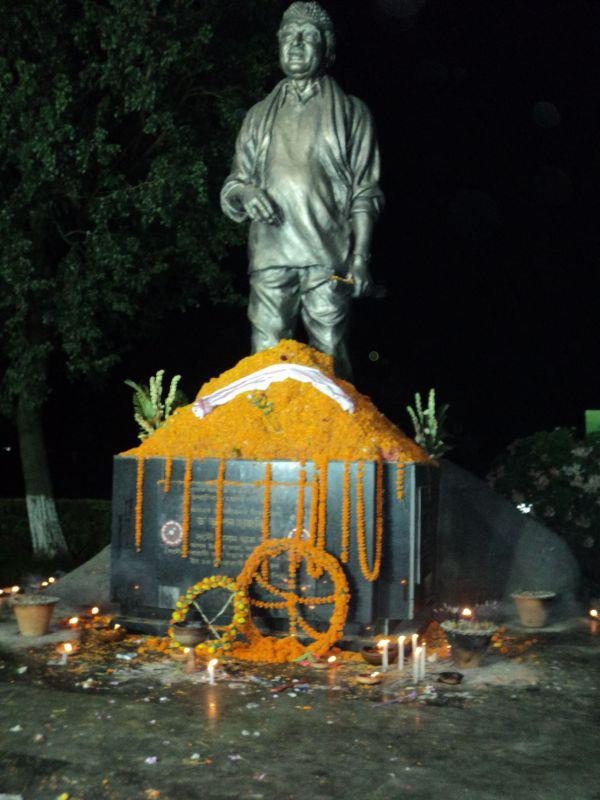
Statue of Bhupen Hazarika at Guwahati

As a singer, Hazarika was known for his baritone voice; as a lyricist, he was known for poetic compositions and parables which touched on themes ranging from romance to social and political commentary; and as a composer, for his use of folk music. In a poll conducted in Bangladesh, his song, Manush Manusher Jonno (Humans are for humanity) was chosen to be the second most favorite number after the National anthem of Bangladesh. Some of his most famous compositions were adaptations of American Black Spiritual that he had learned from Paul Robeson, whom he had befriended during his years in New York City in the early 1950s. His famous song "Bistirno Parore" is heavily influenced by Ol' Man River sung by Paul Robeson.

During his lifetime, a full-length documentary feature biopic film on his life titled Moi Eti Zazabor ('I am a Wanderer') jointly directed by Late Waesqurni Bora and Arnab Jan Deka was launched in 1986 at his Nizarapar residence in Guwahati city. Music for this biopic film has been scored by 5-time International Best Music Awards winner only Assamese musician, songwriter, composer and singer Jim Ankan Deka, who also worked as Chief Assistant Director of this film. During the next two decades, the joint directors Late Bora and Deka shot him live for the film during his various public performances all over India, as well as many private moments in his domestic and social life. Arnab Jan Deka also extensively interviewed him regarding his life and its creative aspects for the film, which had been recorded during their joint travel to different metropolises and remote corners of Assam and rest of India. The film has been under production since 1986 with film negative footage of more than 16 hours currently preserved in different film laboratories in Bombay (Mumbai), Calcutta (Kolkata) and Madras (Chennai). The film was targeted for public release during the lifetime of Dr Bhupen Hazarika in 2008. But the production was halted after sudden demise of one of the co-directors Waesqurni Bora in November 2008. Eventually, after the death of Dr Hazarika, the film's subject, the surviving co-director Arnab Jan Deka is currently carrying out necessary works to finish the film at the earliest and release for public consumption in several language versions including English, Assamese, Bengali and Hindi, with support from Late Waesqurni Bora's widowed wife Nazma Begum and Dr Hazarika's bereaved family members including his wife Priyam Hazarika and Tej Hazarika. Meanwhile, two books describing the unforgettable experiences of the making of this milestone biopic film had been authored by its co-director Arnab Jan Deka titled Anya Ek Zazabor and Mor Sinaki Bhupenda, first of which had been officially released in February 1993 by Late G P Sippy, then President of Film Federation of India and producer of world-record holder Hindi film Sholay at a public function organised by Dr Bhupen Hazarika himself.

== Awards and honors ==
=== National and state honors ===
- Best Feature Film in Assamese (Shakuntala, Directed by Bhupen Hazarika) in the 9th National Film Awards (1961)
- Best Feature Film in Assamese (Pratidhwani, Directed by Bhupen Hazarika) in the 12th National Film Awards
- Best Feature Film in Assamese (Lotighoti, Directed by Bhupen Hazarika) in the 14th National Film Awards
- National Film Award for Best Music Direction for Chameli Memsaab (music by Bhupen Hazarika) in the 23rd National Film Awards (1975)
- Padma Shri – the fourth highest civilian award in the Republic of India (1977)
- Gold medal from the State Government of Arunachal Pradesh for "outstanding contribution towards tribal welfare, and uplift of tribal culture through cinema and music." (1979)
- Sangeet Natak Akademi Award (1987)
- Dadasaheb Phalke Award (1992)
- Padma Bhushan – the third highest civilian award in the Republic of India (2001)
- Sangeet Natak Akademi Fellowship (2008)
- Asom Ratna — the highest civilian award in the State of Assam, India (2009)
- Friends of Liberation War Honour, Government of Bangladesh (2011)
- Padma Vibhushan – the second highest civilian award in the Republic of India (2012, posthumous)
- Bharat Ratna , the highest civilian award in the Republic of India (2019, posthumous)

=== Other awards and recognition ===
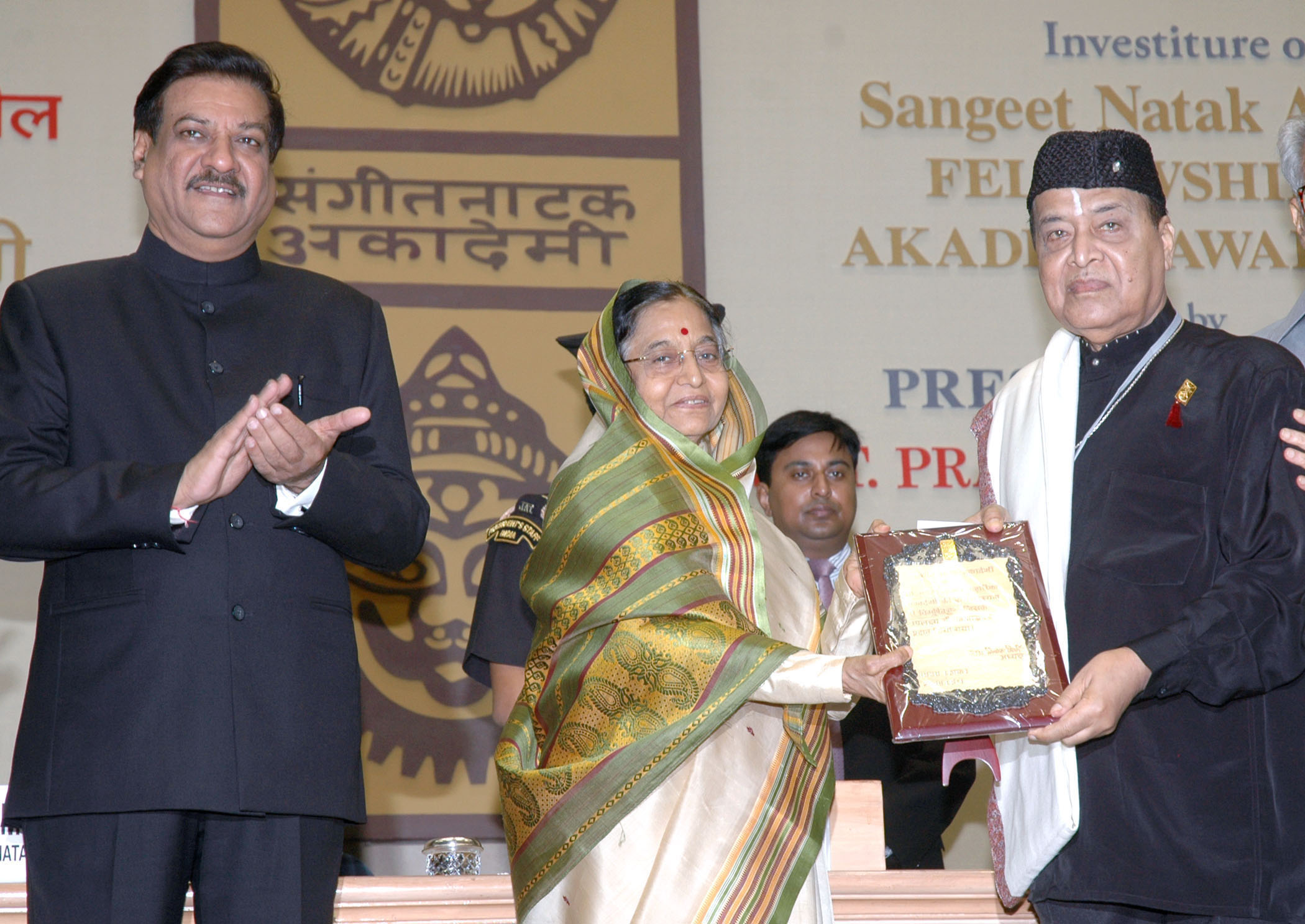
Pratibha Devisingh Patil presenting the Sangeet Natak Akademi Fellow Award-08 to Bhupendra Kumar Hazarika for his outstanding contribution to Indian music

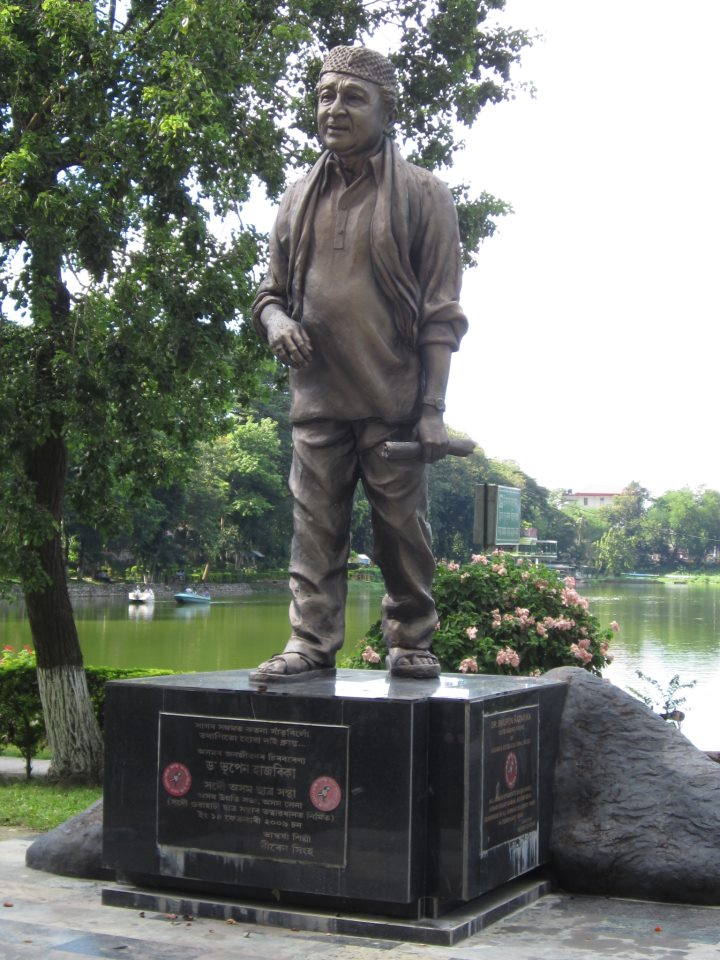
Bhupen Hazarika Statue

- All India Critic Association Award for best performing folk artist (1979)
- In 1979 and 1980 he won the Ritwik Ghatak Award as best music director for two theatre plays, Mohua Sundari, and Nagini Kanyar Kahini
- Bengal Journalist's Association Indira Gandhi Smriti Puraskar in (1987)
- First Indian to win Best Music for the film Rudaali at the Asia Pacific International Film Festival in Japan (1993)
- Honorary Degree from Tezpur University (2001)
- 10th Kalakar Award for Lifetime Achievement in the year 2002, Kolkata.
- In February 2009, the All Assam Students Union erected a life size statue of Hazarika on the banks of Digholi Pukhuri in Guwahati.
- A full-length docu-feature biopic film on his life titled Moi Eti Zazabor('I am a Wanderer') jointly directed by Late Waesqurni Bora and Arnab Jan Deka has been under production since 1986
- In 2010, Assam Cricket Association renamed the Barshapara Cricket Stadium as Dr. Bhupen Hazarika Cricket Stadium.
- Muktijoddha Padak— Awarded as a "Friend of the Freedom Struggle" award by Bangladesh Government (posthumously, 2011)
- Asom Sahitya Sabha has honored him with the title "Biswa Ratna".
- Hazarika was honored with commemorative postage stamps by India Post in 2013 and 2016.
- The longest road bridge of India, Dhola-Sadiya bridge is built over the river Lohit, which is a tributary of the Brahmaputra. It links Dhola and Sadiya both are in Tinsukia district of Assam is named after him.
- On 8 September 2022, Google honored Hazarika with a Google Doodle to mark his 96th birth anniversary. The doodle, featuring Hazarika playing the harmonium, was created by Mumbai-based guest artist Rutuja Mali.

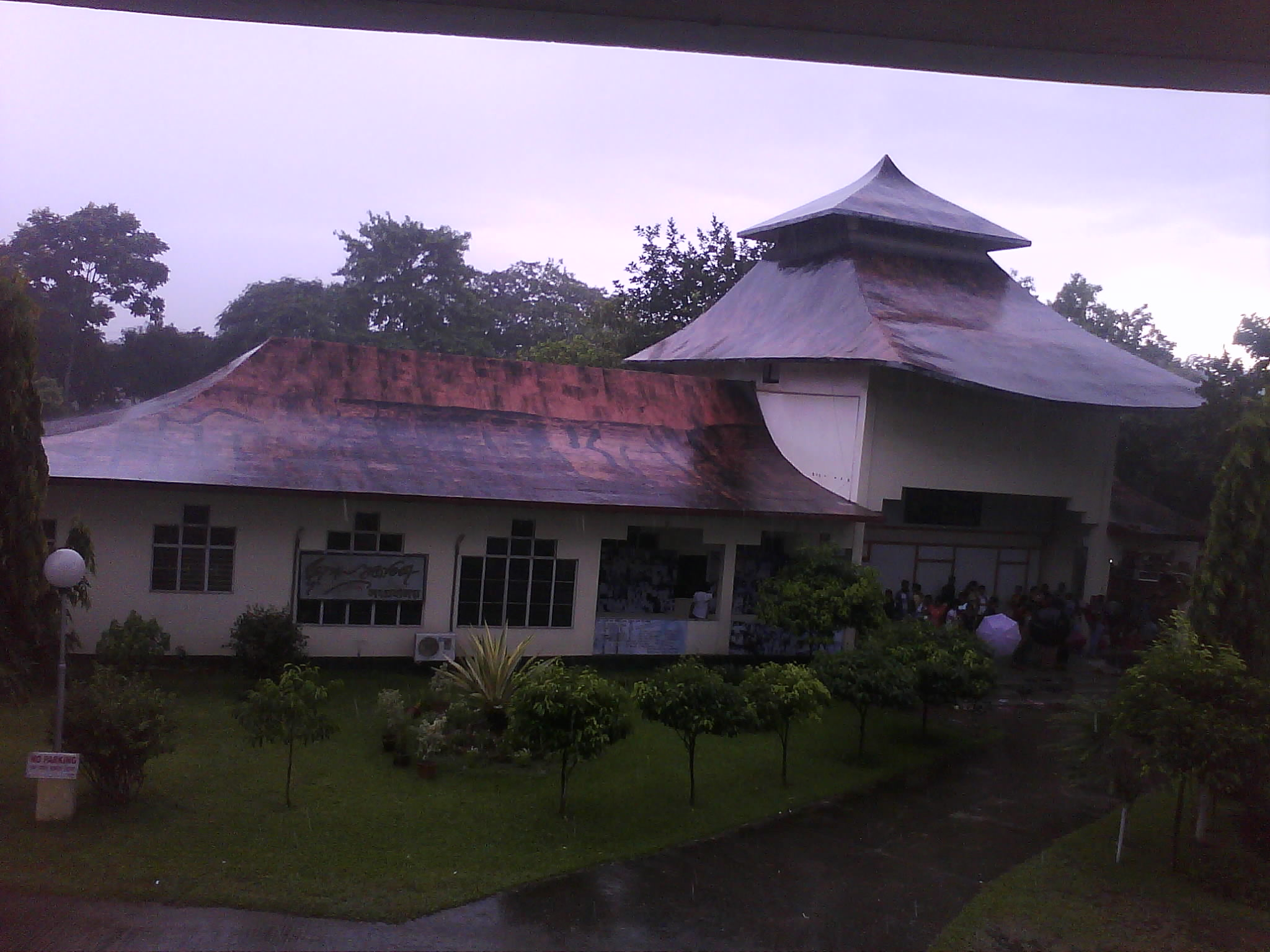
Bhupen Hazarika Museum inside Shankardev Kalakshetra, Guwahati, Assam

- The 56th International Film Festival of India taking place from 20 to 28 November 2025, will celebrate centenary and pay tribute to Bhupen Hazarika by screening his classic films.

== Filmography ==
Year	Film	Credited as					
Year	Film	Playback singer	Composer	Director	Producer	Writer	Actor
1939	Indramalati	Yes					
1948	Siraj	Yes					
1955	Pioli Phukan	Yes					
1956	Era Bator Sur	Yes		Yes			
1958	Mahut Bandhu Re			Yes			
1961	Shakuntala	Yes	Yes	Yes			
1964	Pratidhwani			Yes			
1964	Ka Swariti			Yes			
1966	Lati-Ghati			Yes			
1969	Chik Mik Bijuli	Yes	Yes	Yes			
1974	Aarop		Yes				
1974	For Whom the Sun Shines			Yes			
1975	Chameli Memsaab	Yes	Yes				
1975	Khoj	Yes	Yes				
1976	Roop Konwar Jyoti Parsad Aru Joymoti			Yes			
1976	Mera Dharam Meri Maa	Yes		Yes			
1977	Through Melody and Rhythm			Yes			
1977	Shimana Perye		Yes				
1978	Chameli Memsaheb (Bengali)	Yes					
1979	Mon-Prajapati			Yes			
1979	Debdas	Yes					
1981	Chameli Memsaab	Yes					
1982	Aparoopa		Yes				
1986	Swikarokti			Yes			
1986	Ek Pal	Yes	Yes		Yes		Yes
1988	Siraj	Yes		Yes			
1993	Rudaali	Yes	Yes				
1993	Pratimurti		Yes				
1995	Pani	Yes	Yes				
1997	Do Rahain		Yes				
1997	Darmiyaan: In Between	Yes	Yes				
1998	Saaz		Yes				
2000	Gaja Gamini	Yes	Yes				
2001	Daman: A Victim of Marital Violence	Yes	Yes				
2003	Kyon?		Yes				
2006	Chingaari	Yes				Yes	
2011	Gandhi to Hitler	Yes					

== Discography ==
=== Playback songs ===
Year	Song	Film	Composer	Lyricist	Co-singer(s)	Language	Notes	Ref.
1939	"Kaxote Kolosi Loi"	Indramalati	Jyoti Prasad Agarwala	Jyoti Prasad Agarwala	—	Assamese	Recorded at age 12; debut film song	
1939	"Biswo Bijoyi Nowjüwan"	Indramalati	Jyoti Prasad Agarwala	Jyoti Prasad Agarwala	Chorus	Assamese	Revolutionary youth song	
1955	"Gãwore Jiyori Xopün Xundori"	Piyoli Phukan	Bhupen Hazarika	Bhupen Hazarika	—	Assamese	—	
1955	"Ohü Hü Mohü Hü"	Piyoli Phukan	Bhupen Hazarika	Bhupen Hazarika	—	Assamese	—	
1955	"Ujai Burai Dile"	Piyoli Phukan	Bhupen Hazarika	Bhupen Hazarika	Gunada Das	Assamese	—	
1955	"Piyoli Piyoli Kötonü Lukali"	Piyoli Phukan	Bhupen Hazarika	Bhupen Hazarika	—	Assamese	—	
1955	"Dukhorü Upori Dukh Mür Raizoi"	Piyoli Phukan	Bhupen Hazarika	Bhupen Hazarika	Gunada Das	Assamese	—	
1955	"Oxomir Mukhote Hãhi Nai Etiya"	Piyoli Phukan	Bhupen Hazarika	Bhupen Hazarika	Shamshad Begum, Gunada Das	Assamese	—	
1955	"Tejore Komolapoti"	Piyoli Phukan	Traditional	Madhavdev	—	Early Assamese	Borgeet	
1956	"Jünakore Rati Oxomire Mati"	Era Bator Xur	Bhupen Hazarika	Bhupen Hazarika	—	Assamese	—	
1956	"Xagor Xongomot Kotona Xãturilü̃"	Era Bator Xur	Bhupen Hazarika	Bhupen Hazarika	—	Assamese	—	
1956	"Jonokpuror Janokiye Misikmasak Hãhe"	Era Bator Xur	Bhupen Hazarika	Bhupen Hazarika	Sandhya Mukherjee	Assamese	—	
1956	"Ö Jiwon Dinga Bai Thaka Bandho He"	Era Bator Xur	Bhupen Hazarika	Bhupen Hazarika	Hemanta Mukherjee	Assamese	—	
1956	"Röd Puwabor Karone Matibanü Kak"	Era Bator Xur	Bhupen Hazarika	Bhupen Hazarika	Hemanta Mukherjee and Lata Mangeshkar	Assamese	—	
1961	"Olouguti Tolouguti Kün Köt Lotighoti Kosupator Lai"	Shakuntala	Bhupen Hazarika	Bhupen Hazarika	Ila Basu	Assamese	Won National Film Award for Best Assamese Feature Film	
1961	"Biraje Ki Xaje Prokritire Jiyori"	Shakuntala	Bhupen Hazarika	Bhupen Hazarika	—	Assamese	—	
1961	"Pitri Griho Tyagi Ai Mür Poti Grihe Jay"	Shakuntala	Bhupen Hazarika	Bhupen Hazarika	—	Assamese	—	
1964	"Lieng Makao Kün Paharor Xikhorote Bat Saisa"	Protidhwoni	Bhupen Hazarika	Bhupen Hazarika	Talat Mahmood	Assamese	—	
1964	"He He He Dhüle-Dogore"	Protidhwoni	Bhupen Hazarika	Bhupen Hazarika	Bandana Hazarika	Assamese	—	
1964	"Oy Oy Akax Xubo"	Protidhwoni	Bhupen Hazarika	Bhupen Hazarika	Suman Kalyanpur	Assamese	—	
1964	"Dehi Oi Luitor Xipare Majuli"	Protidhwoni	Bhupen Hazarika	Bhupen Hazarika	Kabita Hazarika	Assamese	—	
1966	"Tirap Ximanto Rupor Nai Onto"	Loti Ghoti	Bhupen Hazarika	Bhupen Hazarika	—	Assamese	—	
1966	"Küne Koy Moi Okolxoriya"	Loti Ghoti	Bhupen Hazarika	Bhupen Hazarika	—	Assamese	—	
1966	"Xohosrojone Mük Prosno Kore"	Loti Ghoti	Bhupen Hazarika	Bhupen Hazarika	—	Assamese	—	
1966	"Prosondo Dhumuhai Prosno Korile Mük"	Loti Ghoti	Bhupen Hazarika	Bhupen Hazarika	—	Assamese	—	
1966	"Kün Köt Lotighoti Kinü Bhoilo Kalo"	Loti Ghoti	Bhupen Hazarika	Bhupen Hazarika	—	Assamese	—	
1966	"Romzanore Rüza Göl Ülal Eidor Jün"	Loti Ghoti	Bhupen Hazarika	Bhupen Hazarika	—	Assamese	—	
1969	"Pokkhyiraj Ghü̃ra"	Sikmik Bijuli	Bhupen Hazarika	Bhupen Hazarika	Kishore Kumar and Asha Bhosle	Assamese		
1969	"Milonor Ei Xubhokhyon Pokhila Uradi Ure Mon"	Sikmik Bijuli	Bhupen Hazarika	Bhupen Hazarika	Suman Kalyanpur	Assamese	—	
1969	"Shomma Thakile Jorur Jorur Porüwana Je Ahiboi"	Sikmik Bijuli	Bhupen Hazarika	Bhupen Hazarika	Dost Habibur Rahman	Assamese	—	
1975	"Oxom Dexor Bagisare"	Chameli Memsaab	Bhupen Hazarika	Bhupen Hazarika	Usha Mangeshkar	Assamese andBaganiya	Won National Film Award for Best Music Direction	
1975	"Hawa Nai Batash Nai"	Chameli Memsaab	Bhupen Hazarika	Bhupen Hazarika	Usha Mangeshkar	Baganiya		
1975	"Jigija Gijao"	Chameli Memsaab	Bhupen Hazarika	Bhupen Hazarika	Usha Mangeshkar	Baganiya	—	
1975	"O Bidexi Bondhu"	Chameli Memsaab	Bhupen Hazarika	Bhupen Hazarika	—	Assamese	—	
1975	"Jilmiliya Kümol Bali"	Khüj	Bhupen Hazarika	Bhupen Hazarika	Usha Mangeshkar	Assamese	—	
1976	"Neela Neela Aasmaan"	Mera Dharam Meri Maa	Bhupen Hazarika	Gajanan Varma	Ruma Guha Thakurta	Hindi	First feature film of Arunachal Pradesh	
1976	"Arun Kiran Sheesh Bhushan Arunachal Hamara"	Mera Dharam Meri Maa	Bhupen Hazarika	Gajanan Varma	Ila Bose and Ruma Guha Thakurta	Hindi	—	
1977	"Megh Thom Thom Kore"	Simana Periye	Bhupen Hazarika	Fazal Shahabuddin		Bengali	Bangladeshi film	
1978	"Boshikoron Kajol Chokhe"	Chameli Memsaheb	Bhupen Hazarika	Shibdas Banerjee	Usha Mangeshkar	Bengali	Bengali adaptation	
1981	"Insaan Insaan Ke Liye"	Chamelee Memsaab	Bhupen Hazarika	Bhupen Hazarika	Kamal Ganguli	Hindi	Hindi adaptation	
1986	"Mora Gora Ang Lai Le"	Ek Pal	Bhupen Hazarika	Gulzar	Lata Mangeshkar	Hindi	Also film producer/co-writer	
1986	"Main To Sang Jaaun Banwas"	Ek Pal	Bhupen Hazarika	Gulzar	Lata Mangeshkar	Hindi	—	
1986	"Zara Dheere Zara Dheeme - I"	Ek Pal	Bhupen Hazarika	Gulzar	Bhupinder Singh, Usha Mangeshkar and Haimanti Shukla	Hindi	—	
1988	"Ognijugor Phiringoti Moi Notun Oxom Gorhim"	Siraj	Bhupen Hazarika	Bhupen Hazarika	—	Assamese	—	
1988	"Kõpi Uthe Kiyo Tajmohol"	Siraj	Bhupen Hazarika	Bhupen Hazarika	Lata Mangeshkar	Assamese	—	
1988	"Aru Nobojabi Bin Batorüwa"	Siraj	Bhupen Hazarika	Shiv Bhattacharya	Usha Mangeshkar	Assamese	—	
1988	"Allahr Bine Keu Nai Ar"	Siraj	Traditional	Azan Faqir	—	Assamese	Assamese Zikir	
1993	"Dil Hoom Hoom Kare (Part 2)"	Rudaali	Bhupen Hazarika	Gulzar	—	Hindi	Male solo version; set to Raga Bhoopali	
1993	"Samay O Dheere Chalo (Part 2)"	Rudaali	Bhupen Hazarika	Gulzar	—	Hindi	Male solo version; set to Raga Bhimpalasi	
1993	"Maula O Maula"	Rudaali	Bhupen Hazarika	Gulzar	—	Hindi	Solo track	
1997	"Babu Darogaji"	Darmiyaan: In Between	Bhupen Hazarika	Javed Akhtar	Sapna Awasthi	Hindi	—	
1997	"Duniya Paraayi Log Yahaan Begaane"	Darmiyaan: In Between	Bhupen Hazarika	Javed Akhtar	—	Hindi	—	
2000	"Gaja Gamini"	Gaja Gamini	Bhupen Hazarika	Maya Govind	—	Hindi	Title track	
2001	"Gum Sum Nisha Aayi"	Daman	Bhupen Hazarika	Maya Govind	—	Hindi	—	
2001	"Hu Hu Paagal"	Daman	Bhupen Hazarika	Maya Govind	Kavita Krishnamurthy	Hindi	—	

== Bibliography ==
Essays

1. Jui! Jui! Jui!!! Numuwabo Küne? (জুই! জুই!! জুই!!! নুমুৱাব কোনে?)
2. Xorotot Xarodiyo Bhab Ase Janü? (শৰতত শাৰদীয় ভাব আছে জানো?)
3. Oxomor Buddhijiwi Nimat Kiyo (অসমৰ বুদ্ধিজীৱী নিমাত কিয়?)
4. Oxomot Ekotar Mrityu Höl (অসমত একতাৰ মৃত্যু হ’ল)
5. Oxomor Orthonitit Trax (অসমৰ অৰ্থনীতিত ত্ৰাস)
6. Kendror Rajnoitik Paxakhel (কেন্দ্ৰৰ ৰাজনৈতিক পাশাখেল)
7. Durniti Bondho Korok, Lasit Xena Gothon Korok (দুৰ্নীতি বন্ধ কৰক, লাচিত সেনা গঠন কৰক, 1967)
8. Gitere Juddho Koriboü Pari, Jikiboü Pari (গীতেৰে যুদ্ধ কৰিবও পাৰি, জিকিবও পাৰি)
9. Juktorastror Gãü Onsolot Püwa Xikkhya (যুক্তৰাষ্ট্ৰৰ গাঁও অঞ্চলত পোৱা শিক্ষা)
10. Markin Gonotontro Kerün (মাৰ্কিন গণতন্ত্ৰ কেৰোণ)
11. Guatemala Jage Okolxore (গুৱাটেমালা জাগে অকলশৰে)
12. Ronangonor Bixoye (ৰণাংগনৰ বিষয়ে)
13. Meaning for Millions
14. India of My Dreams

Article collections

1. Bohniman Luitor Pare Pare (বহ্নিমান লুইতৰ পাৰে পাৰে, 1993)
2. Proxongo: Xundoror (প্ৰসঙ্গ: সুন্দৰৰ, 2005)
3. Collections of Dr. Bhupen Hazarika's English Writings

Song collections

1. Agoli Bãhore Lahori Gogona (আগলি বাঁহৰে লাহৰী গগনা, 1964)
2. Dr. Bhupen Hazarikar Git Xomogro (ড° ভূপেন হাজৰিকাৰ গীত সমগ্ৰ, 1993)
3. Bohniman Brohmoputro (বহ্নিমান ব্ৰহ্মপুত্ৰ)

Screenplay collections

1. Sitronatyo (Sikmik Bijuli Aru Siraj) (চিত্ৰনাট্য (চিকমিক বিজুলী আৰু চিৰাজ))

Speech collections

1. Dr. Bhupen Hazarikar Bhaxon Xomogro (ড॰ ভূপেন হাজৰিকাৰ ভাষণ সমগ্ৰ)

Travelogues

1. Dihinge Dipange (দিহিঙে দিপাঙে)

Children's literature

1. Bhupen Mamar Gite Mate O, A, Ko, Kho (ভূপেন মামাৰ গীতে মাতে অ, আ, ক, খ, 1976)

Biographies and autobiographies

1. Moi Eti Jajabor (মই এটি যাযাবৰ)
2. Memories of My Past
3. Jyoti Kokaideu (জ্যোতি ককাইদেউ)
4. Bishnu Kokaideu (বিষ্ণু ককাইদেউ)

Omnibuses

1. Dr. Bhupen Hazarika Rosonawoli Prothom Khondo (ড° ভূপেন হাজৰিকা ৰচনাৱলী প্ৰথম খণ্ড, 2008)
2. Dr. Bhupen Hazarika Rosonawoli Dwitiyo Khondo (ড° ভূপেন হাজৰিকা ৰচনাৱলী দ্বিতীয় খণ্ড, 2008)
3. Dr. Bhupen Hazarika Rosonawoli Tritiyo Khondo (ড° ভূপেন হাজৰিকা ৰচনাৱলী তৃতীয় খণ্ড, 2011)

As editor

1. New India (Volume 149–150)
2. Goti (1965)
3. Bindu (1970)
4. Amar Protinidhi (1965–80)
5. Protidhwoni (1983–90)

== Gallery ==
Some relevant photographs
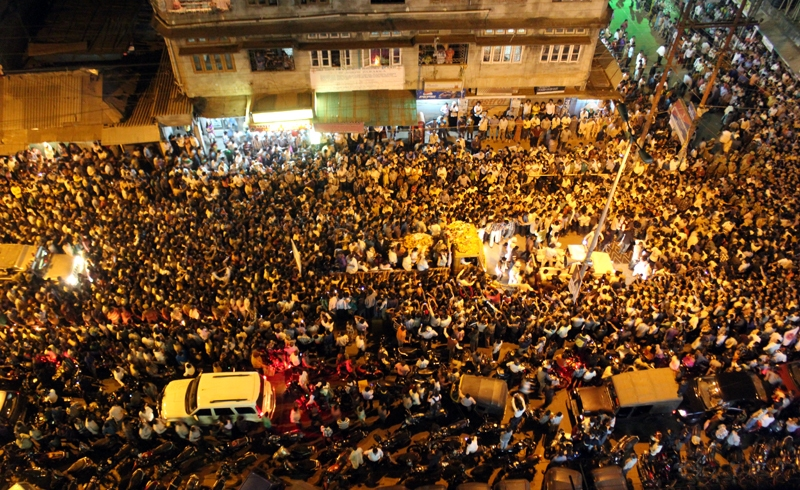
People outside Hazarika's home on 7 November 2011

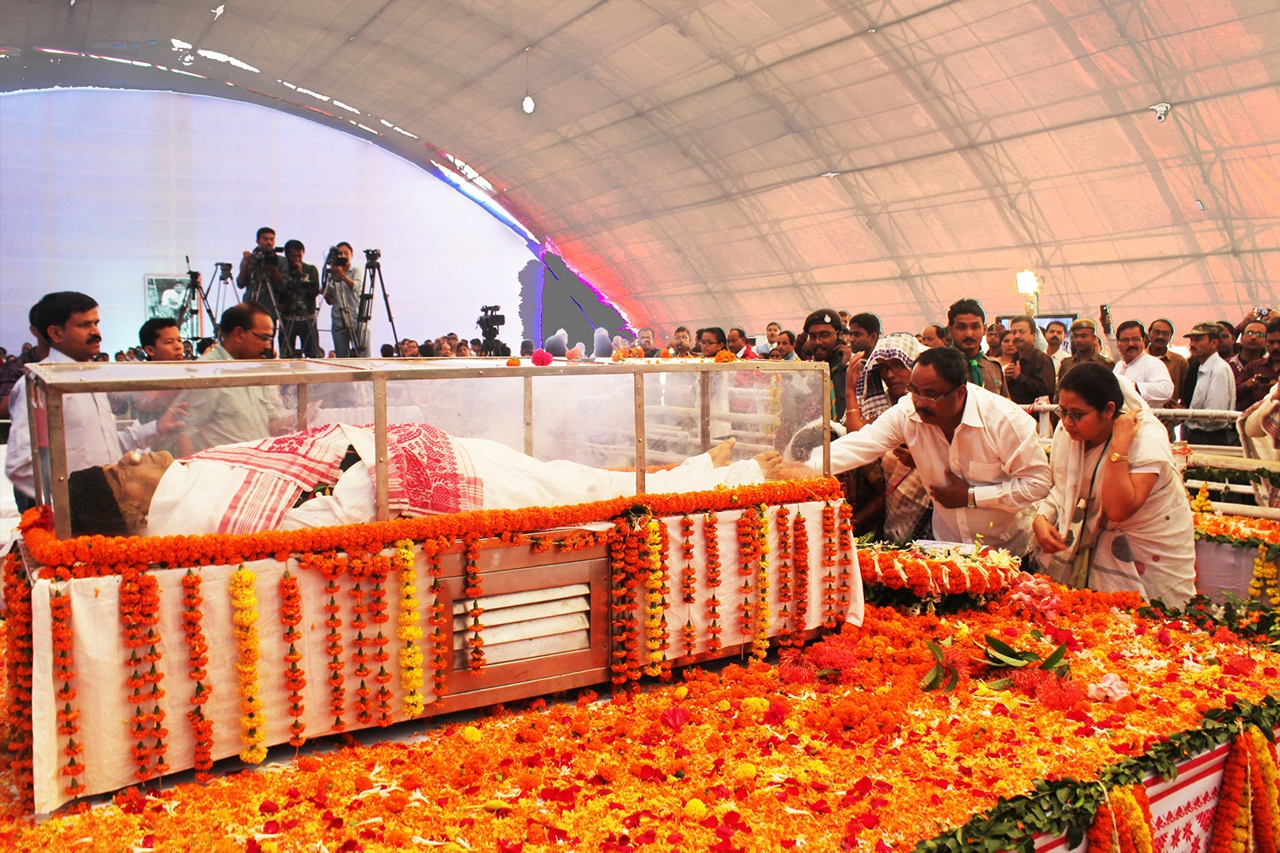
Hazarika lying in repose in Judge field, Guwahati, 8 November 2011

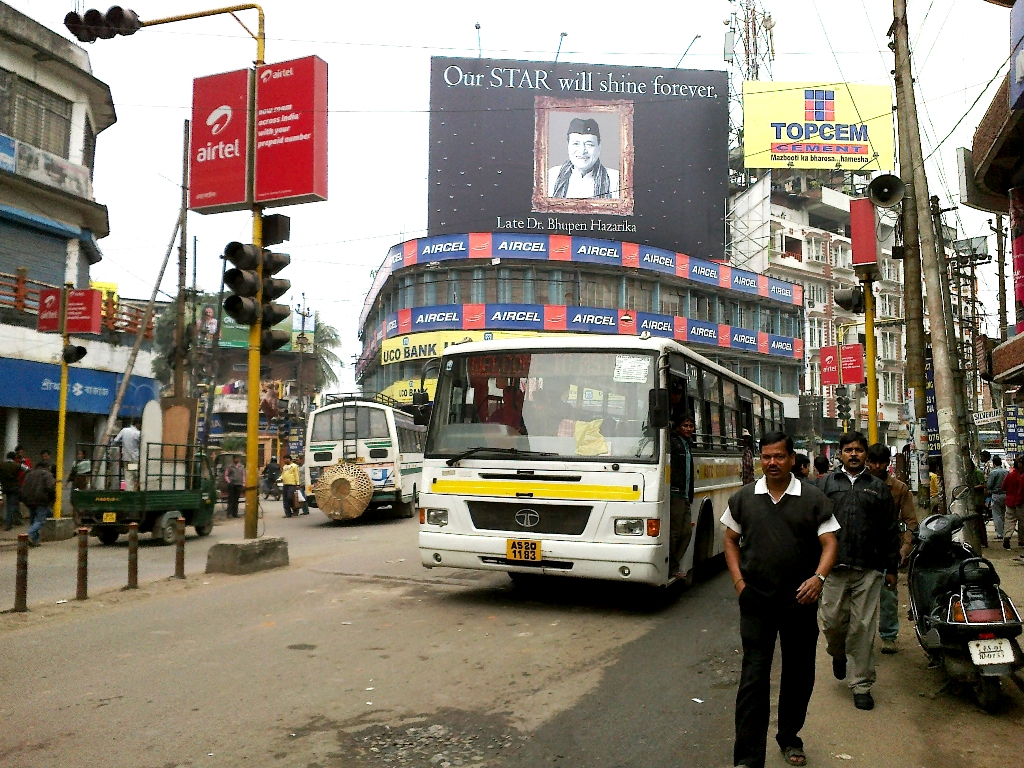
Paltan Bazar, Guwahati, December 2011, one of many centres commemorating Bhupen Hazarika

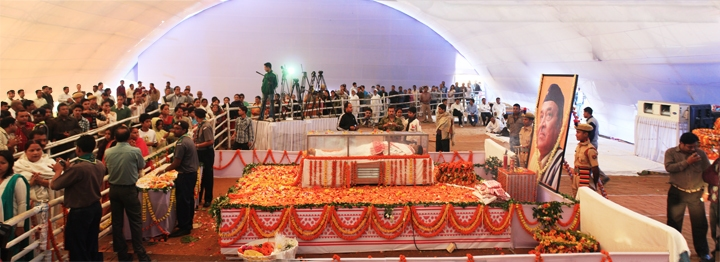
Hazarika lying in repose in Judge field, Guwahati, 8 November 2011
