= Lalita Lajmi =

Indian painter (1932–2023)

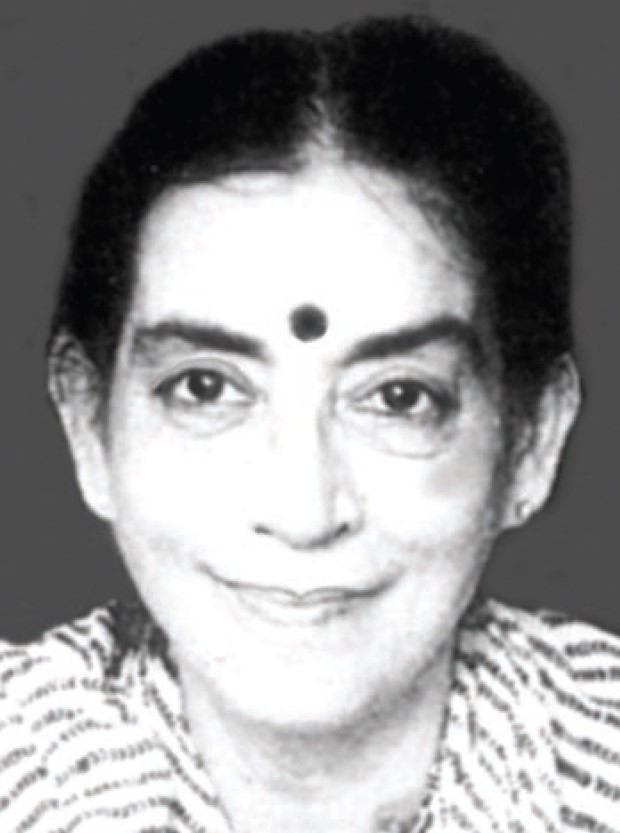
- Born: 17 October 1932; Calcutta, Bengal Presidency, British India (present-day West Bengal, India)
- Died: 13 February 2023 (aged 90)
- Education: Sir J. J. School of Art, Mumbai
- Occupation: Painter
- Years active: 1960–2023
- Children: 2, including Kalpana Lajmi
- Relatives: Guru Dutt (brother); Atma Ram (brother)

Lalita Lajmi (17 October 1932 – 13 February 2023) was an Indian painter. She was a self-taught artist born into a family involved in the arts, and was very fond of classical dance even as a child. She was the sister of Hindi film director, producer, and actor Guru Dutt. In 1994, she was invited to the Guru Dutt Film Festival, organised by Gopalkrishna Gandhi, the Indian High Commissioner at Nehru Centre, London. Her work was also influenced by Indian films such as those made by her brother, Satyajit Ray and Raj Kapoor.

In one of her interviews Lalitha Lajmi said that, being from a middle-class background, her family could not afford her joining classical dance classes. She was from a traditional family and hence developed an interest in art. Her uncle B. B. Benegal, who was a commercial artist from Kolkata, brought her a box of paints. She seriously began painting in 1961 but in those days one could not sell one's work and hence she had to teach in an art school to support herself financially. While teaching she worked with disabled and underprivileged children. Her first painting was sold for just Rs. 100 to a German art collector, Dr. Heinzmode. He used to take her works and in exchange gave her works of German artists or some books.

Lajmi said that her work had no particular direction until the late 1970s. Then she started evolving and started doing etchings, oils and watercolors. Her 1990s work which show hidden tensions that exist between men and women captured different roles they play. But her women were not meek but assertive and aggressive. She even used images of Kali and Durga in her work. Her closest inspiration was a series she painted called "The Family series" and this work was displayed at Chemould.

== Personal life ==
Her parents were originally settled in Karwar but relocated to Bangalore. Lajmi's father was a poet and her mother was a polylingual writer. She grew up in Bhowanipore. Her uncle BB Benegal introduced her to painting as a child when he brought her a box of paints and sent her work for a competition; later she got her first prize. Her urge to paint developed rapidly in the 1960s, which is when she started painting seriously. Her first exhibition was the group exhibition at Jehangir Art Gallery in Mumbai, where, in 1961, she also held her first solo exhibition. Lajmi taught at Campion School and Convent of Jesus & Mary for over two decades and later enrolled in the JJ School of Art to complete her art masters. Lalitha Lajmi's works are held in collections in the National Gallery of Modern Art and the CSMVS Museum in India, and the British Museum.

She married Captain Gopi Lajmi. She has a daughter with Captain Gopi Lajmi. Her daughter, Kalpana Lajmi, was also a Hindi film director.

Lajmi died on 13 February 2023, at the age of 90.

== Career ==
She started painting in the early 1960s, when she participated in a group exhibition at Jehangir Art Gallery, Mumbai. At the same gallery she had her first solo exhibition in 1961. Over a career spanning 5 decades, she had several exhibitions at both national and international platforms. She has exhibited her work in India, (Germany) and US. Lajmi has given lectures in India and UK as well. She also showcased her work in Graphic workshop of Prof. Paul Lingerine in Mumbai and two of her etchings were selected for "India Festival" 1985, USA. Her work has been displayed in various famous art galleries including Prithvi Art Gallery, Pundole Art Gallery, Apparao Gallery, Chennai, Pundole Gallery, Mumbai, Hutheesing Centre for Visual Art, Ahmedabad, Art Heritage, New Delhi, Gallery Gay, Germany, Prints Exhibition at Max Muller Bhavan, Kolkata etc. Lajmi's primary work was appreciated but she shrugged that her later work was left unnoticed because of which she started teaching at Campion school and Convent of Jesus and Mary for over 20 years.

Some of her group exhibitions includes A SYCO, The viewing Room, Mumbai, Think Small, art Alive Gallery, New Delhi, The Feminine Eye, Gallery Sara Arakkal, Bangalore. Her initial work displayed a lot of autobiographical elements and her later work reflected the hidden tension between men and women. Lajmi has also showcased a natural bonding between mother and daughter in her work.

She gave a guest appearance in Aamir Khan's 2007 Bollywood film, Taare Zameen Par and has also done costume designing for a play by Amol Palekar She has also worked as a graphics artist in Hindi movie Aghaat.

== Style ==
Lalita was a self-taught artist, in spite of art and painting books, she lacked guidance in her style and kind of art and hence, she ended up constantly experimenting. Gradually, at the end of the 1970s, she began doing etchings and oil and watercolor paintings. When observed, most of her work displays strong autobiographical elements. Her earlier works drew inspirations from her personal life and observations, while her later work reflected the hidden tension between men and women.

Lajmi's works are figurative in nature – men, women, children and clowns. 'Performance' has been a constant motif on her works, she portraits people's interactions, her early works were melancholic in nature, and her later works are more optimistic. But through the years, her works have continued being autobiographical.

In the mid-1980s, Lajmi's work had evolved into etchings, oils and watercolors. The works of the late 1980s and early 1990s reflect the latent tensions that exist between men and women, captured in the different roles they play. She portrays her women as assertive and aggressive individuals. She uses the images of Durga or Kali on the top of emaciated men who are kneeling, almost as if they were in the middle of some form of classical corporal punishment. She has also depicted the natural bonding that exists between women, between mother and daughter figures, perhaps drawing from her own relationship with her daughter, well-known filmmaker Kalpana.

For Lajmi, nurturing her passion for art and cinema was a constant struggle. Indian films have been the biggest influence on her work, especially the ones made by her brother, Guru Dutt, Satyajit Ray and Raj Kapoor.

== Exhibitions and collections ==
Exhibitions

- 13 January 2023 to 26 February 2023: National Gallery of Modern Art, Mumbai - The Mind's Cupboard - Lalitha Lajmi - A retrospective curated by Sumesh Sharma
- 1997: Appa Rao Gallery, Chennai
- 1996: Pundole's, Mumbai
- 1981: Hutheesing Centre for Visual Art, Ahmedabad
- 1980: Art Heritage, New Delhi
- 1978, 1974, 1972, 1966, 1962, 1961: Mumbai, Germany and USA
- 1978: Gallery Gay, Germany
- 1977: Prints Exhibition at Max Muller Bhavan, Kolkata
- 1976: Boston and Los Angeles

Collections

- Tata Institute of Fundamental Research, Bombay
- Space Research Centre, Ahmedabad
- CMC Office – Bombay, Delhi and Calcutta
- National Gallery of Modern Art, New Delhi
- National Gallery of Modern Art, Mumbai
- Lalit Kala Academy, New Delhi
- Chandigarh Museum, Chandigarh
- Bradford Museum, England, UK
- British Museum, London, UK
- Air India Office, Bombay
- Procter and Gamble Ltd
- Jehangir Nicholson Art Foundation
- Birla Museum, Hyderabad
- Tehelka, “ART FOR FREEDOM” for BON-HAMS Auction in London
- Domestic airport in Mumbai by Tarana Khubchandani of Art & Soul Gallery.
- Jehangir Art Gallery, 15–21 January 2014

== Awards ==
- 1997: ICCR Travel Grant for International Contemporary Indian Women Artists Show for 50 Years of Indian Independence organized by Mills College of Art at Oakland, California
- 1983: ICCR Travel Grant to Germany
- 1979: Bombay Art Society, Mumbai
- 1978: State Art Exhibition Award
- 1977: Bombay Art Society Award (Etching)
- 1977: ICCR Travel Grant to Oakland, California
- She was the recipient of the Government of India Junior Fellowship from 1979 to 1983
