= Maya Govind =

Indian lyricist (1940–2022)

- Born: Maya Govind; 17 January 1940; British India
- Died: 7 April 2022 (aged 82)
- Genre: Classical music
- Occupation: lyricist
- Instrument: vocals
- Years active: 1974–2001

Maya Govind (17 January 1940 – 7 April 2022) was an Indian lyricist who wrote songs for many Bollywood films. She has written popular songs such as "Mera Piya Ghar Aaya", " Gale Mein Laal Tai", "Maine Paayal Hai Chhankayi", " Main Khiladi Tu Anari", "Aankhon Mein Base Ho Tum" etc. She wrote lyrics in films like Aarop (1974), Main Khiladi Tu Anari (1994), Takkar (1995), Yaarana (1995), Hum Tumhare Hain Sanam (2001) etc. She has written over 800 songs.

== Career ==
Maya was married to late director Ram Govind. She started her career after marriage, with a song in Aarop (1974), starring Vinod Khanna. The music was composed by Bhupen Hazarika and was rendered by Kishore Kumar and Lata Mangeshkar. At a time of Urdu-poets' prominence and male domination in the songwriting industry, she established herself with her songs. She has written songs for such composers as Kalyanji-Anandji, Bappi Lahiri, Khayyam, Dilip Sen–Sameer Sen and Anu Malik. Anu Malik was her most frequent collaborator, with whom she worked in commercially successful films including, Main Khiladi Tu Anari (1994), Takkar (1995), and Yaarana (1995).

Apart from films, she wrote title songs in numerous television series such as Maayka, Phulwa, Mahabharat (1987), etc. She also penned Falguni Pathak's 2000 Indie-pop song "Maine Paayal Hai Chhankayi", which emerged as a nationwide rage.

== Death ==
She died on 7 April 2022 following a heart attack, at the age of 82.
