= Phani Sarma =

Assamese actor and director

- Born: 1910
- Died: 1970 (aged 59–60)
- Occupations: stage actor, theatre actor, film actor, director
- Writing career
- Language: Assamese

Phani Sarma (1910–1970) was an Indian theatre actor, playwright, film actor and director. Beginning as a stage actor, he appeared in the first film ever made in Assamese cinema, Joymati, in 1935. Sarma was conferred with the title "Natasurya" for his contribution towards Assamese drama.

He acted in and directed Siraj in 1948 and Piyoli Phukan in 1955.

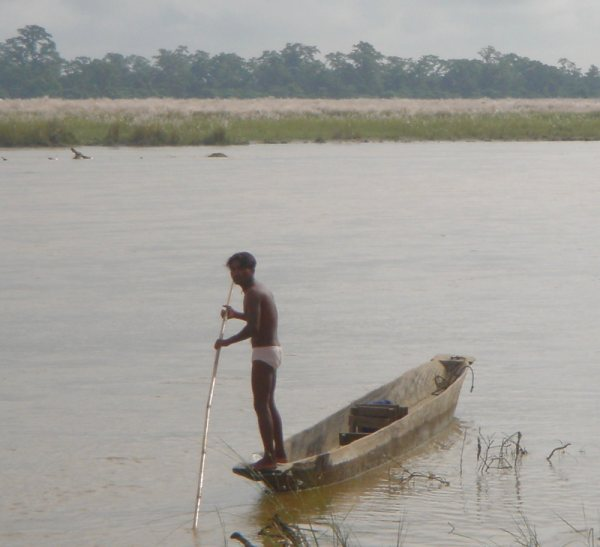
The Kohinoor Opera would often perform outside along the banks of the Brahmaputra River

== Film career ==
In 1933 Phani Sarma starred in the first Assamese film, Joymati, directed by Jyoti Prasad Agarwala. Sarma went on the star in Agarwalla's second picture Indramalati.

In 1955 he directed and starred in Piyoli Phukan, also playing the film's protagonist Pioli Phukan. His last film was Ito Sito Bahuto in 1963 where he appeared as an actor rather than taking the director's helm.

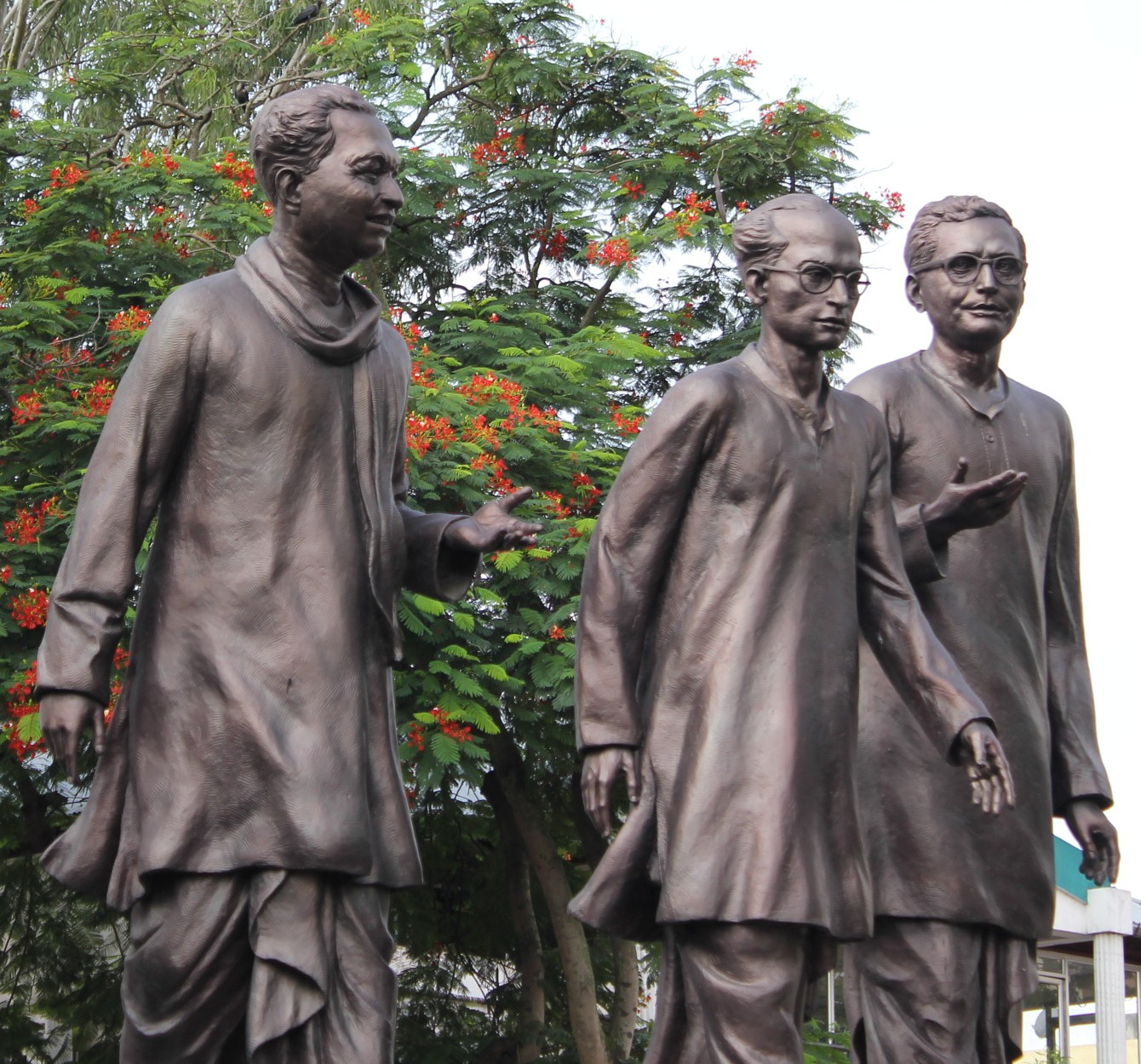
Statue of Kalaguru, Rupkonwar and Natasurjya at Guwahati (Side view)

== Playwright work ==
Inspired by his own experiences as an actor and the death of his son whilst stage acting, Phani Sarma wrote the social drama Kiya, a tale of an artist entertained other people with very little compensation from society. Sarma again addressed issues of isolation and corruption in his later drama Nag-Pas. However he often incorporated humour into such dramas, and the drama Kola-Bazar, he incorporated elements of comedy with more serious issues of social injustice and inequality.

Sarma also translated J. B. Priestley's famous drama An Inspector Calls into the Assamese language.

== Filmography ==
Year	Film	Role(s)
1935	Joymati	Gathi Hazarika
1937	Devdas	Devdas
1939	Indramalati	Lalit
1948	Siraj	Siraj
1955	Piyoli Phukan	Piyoli Phukan
1956	Era Bator Sur	Haran
1961	Lachit Borphukan	Rashid Khan
1963	Ito Sito Bahuto	Retired Major
1964	Maniram Dewan	Maniram Dewan

== See also ==
- Assamese literature
- Mahapurush Srimanta Sankardeva
- Jyoti Prasad Agarwala
- Lakshminath Bezbaruah
- Krishna Kanta Handique
- Bhabananda Deka
- Music of Assam
