= Kalpana Lajmi =

Indian film director

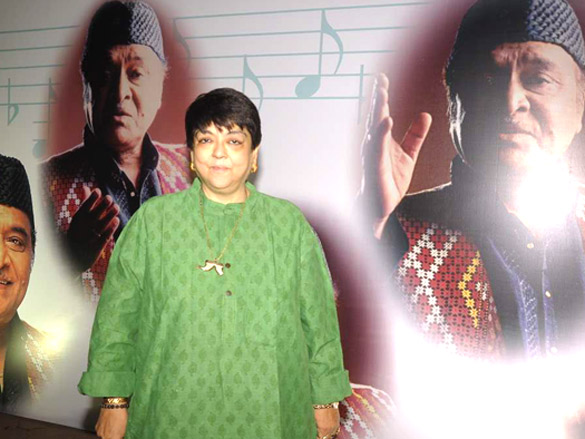
- Born: 1954
- Died: 2018 (aged 63–64)
- Occupation: Filmmaker
- Mother: Lalita Lajmi
- Relatives: Guru Dutt (uncle); Atma Ram (uncle)

Kalpana Lajmi (1954–2018) was an Indian film director, producer and screenwriter. Lajmi was an independent filmmaker working more on realistic, low-budget films, which are known in India as parallel cinema. Her films were often woman-oriented. She had been for a long time the manager of Bhupen Hazarika. She was diagnosed with kidney cancer in 2017 and died on 23 September 2018 at the age of 64.

== Biography ==
Kalpana Lajmi was the daughter of painter Lalita Lajmi and Navy Captain Gopi Lajmi. She was niece of filmmaker Guru Dutt, debuted as an assistant director under the veteran film director Shyam Benegal who was also her relative of the Padukone family. She later went on to work as an assistant costume designer in Shyam Benegal's Bhumika: The Role. She made her directorial début with the documentary film D.G. Movie Pioneer in 1978 and went on to direct more documentaries like A Work Study in Tea Plucking (1979) and Along the Brahmaputra (1981). She debuted as a feature film director in 1986 with Ek Pal (A Moment), starring Shabana Azmi, Naseeruddin Shah and Farooq Sheikh. She produced the film, took part in the film writing and had written the screenplay for the film along with Gulzar.

She then took a break from directing movies and went to direct her first television serial Lohit Kinare (1988) starring Tanvi Azmi. She made her comeback to cinema in 1993 with the critically acclaimed Rudaali starring Dimple Kapadia. Kapadia won the National Film Award for Best Actress for her performance and Lajmi also won accolades for directing the film.

Her next film was Darmiyaan: In Between (1997) which was directed and produced by her. The movie starred Kirron Kher and Tabu.

Her next film in 2001 was Daman: A Victim of Marital Violence. The film was distributed by the Indian Government and was acclaimed by critics. It was the second time that an actress won the National Film Award for Best Actress under Lajmi's directorial hand. This time it was Raveena Tandon, who was not as appreciated before, and Lajmi was credited as being the one to explore the hidden talent in her.

Her next film, Kyon? (2003) was unnoticed, while her last release and her last film was Chingaari in 2006 that starred Sushmita Sen as a village prostitute. Chingaari turned out to be a commercial box-office flop.

== Filmography ==
Year	Film	Role(s)
1978	D.G. Movie Pioneer	Director
1979	A Work Study in Tea Plucking	Director
1981	Along the Brahmaputra	Director
1986	Ek Pal	Director, Producer, Writer
1988	Lohit Kinare	Director
1993	Rudaali	Director, writer
1997	Darmiyaan: In Between	Director, producer
2001	Daman: A Victim of Marital Violence	Director, Writer
2003	Kyon?	Director, producer
2006	Chingaari	Director, producer, writer
