= List of Indian film series =

A lot of sequels and sometimes prequels to the old silver screen feature films have been released in many of the Indian languages. A film series is a collection of related films in succession. Their relationship is not fixed, but generally share a common diegetic world. The film series have been listed according to the date on which the first film of the series was released. Notes have been used to indicate relation to other films.

Only those film series with a minimum of two released films are listed. Otherwise, a series is only listed if a prequel or sequel is confirmed to be made and will be released in the near future.

== Assamese ==
=== Story-line / Character followup ===
1. Dr. Bezbaruah film series (2 films)
  - Dr. Bezbaruah (1969)
  - Dr. Bezbaruah 2 (2023)

=== Common diegetic world ===
1. Local Kung Fu film series (4 films)
  - Local Kung Fu (2013)
  - Local Kung Fu 2 (2017)
  - Local Utpaat (2022)
  - Local Kung Fu 3 (2024)
2. Children film series (3 films)
  - Xagoroloi Bohudoor (1995)
  - Pokhi (1998)
  - Konikar Ramdhenu (2002)

== Bengali ==
=== Story-line / Character followup ===
1. The Apu Series (6 films)
  - The Apu Trilogy
    - Pather Panchali (1955)
    - Aparajito (1956)
    - The World of Apu (1959)
  - Apur Panchali (2013)
  - Avijatrik (2021)
  - Aparajito (2022 film)
2. Kanchenjungha film series (2 films)
  - Kanchenjungha (1962)
  - Abar Kanchanjangha (2022)
3. Byomkesh Bakshi film series (20 films) (Note: If the 2015 Bollywood film Detective Byomkesh Bakshy! is taken into account, the number of films in the franchisee will increase by one and the franchisee must, then, be counted under bilingual or multi-lingual heading.)
  - With Uttam Kumar as Byomkesh Bakshi (1 film)
    - Chiriyakhana (1967)
  - With Satindra Bhattacharya as Byomkesh Bakshi (1 film)
    - Shajarur Kanta (1974)
  - With Subhrajit Dutta as Byomkesh Bakshi (1 film)
    - Magno Mainak (2009)
  - With Abir Chatterjee as Byomkesh Bakshi (9 films)
    - Byomkesh Bakshi (2010)
    - Abar Byomkesh (2012)
    - Byomkesh Phire Elo (2014)
    - Har Har Byomkesh (2015)
    - Byomkesh Pawrbo (2016)
    - Byomkesh Gotro (2018)
    - Biday Byomkesh (2018)
    - Byomkesh Hatyamancha (2022)
  - With Sujoy Ghosh as Byomkesh Bakshi (1 film)
    - Satyanweshi (2013)
  - With Soumitra Chatterjee as Byomkesh Bakshi (1 film)
    - Doorbeen (2014) (Note: Unofficial film; crossover film featuring both Byomkesh Bakshi (played by Soumitra Chatterjee) and Feluda (played by Sabyasachi Chakrabarty).)
  - With Dhritiman Chatterjee as Byomkesh Bakshi (1 film)
    - Shajarur Kanta (2015)
  - With Jisshu Sengupta as Byomkesh Bakshi (3 films)
    - Byomkesh Bakshi (2015)
    - Byomkesh O Chiriyakhana (2016)
    - Byomkesh O Agnibaan (2017)
  - With Parambrata Chatterjee as Byomkesh Bakshi (1 film)
    - Satyanweshi Byomkesh (2019)
  - With Dev as Byomkesh Bakshi (1 film)
    - Byomkesh O Durgo Rahasya (2023)
4. Goopy Gyne Bagha Byne trilogy (3 films) (Note: If the Hindi animated film Goopi Gawaiya Bagha Bajaiya is taken into account, the number of films in the franchisee will increase by one and the franchisee must, then, be counted under bilingual or multi-lingual heading.)
  - Goopy Gyne Bagha Byne (1969)
  - Hirak Rajar Deshe (1980)
  - Goopy Bagha Phire Elo (1992)
5. Aranye film series (2 films)
  - Aranyer Din Ratri (1970)
  - Abar Aranye (2003)
6. Feluda film series (13 films)
  - With Soumitra Chatterjee as Feluda (2 films)
    - Sonar Kella (1974)
    - Joi Baba Felunath (1979)
  - With Sabyasachi Chakrabarty as Feluda (8 films)
    - Baksho Rahashya (2001) (Note: Initially it was a Television film made for the Feluda 30 TV Series which aired on DD Bangla in 1996. Later it was released in Nandan Complex and as DVD & VCD in 2001. Click here and here for further details.)
    - Bombaiyer Bombete (2003)
    - Kailashey Kelenkari (2007)
    - Tintorettor Jishu (2008)
    - Gorosthaney Sabdhan (2010)
    - Royal Bengal Rohosso (2011)
    - Doorbeen (2014)
    - Double Feluda (2016)
  - With Abir Chatterjee as Feluda (1 film)
    - Badshahi Angti (2014)
  - With Indraneil Sengupta as Feluda (2 films)
    - Hatyapuri (2022)
    - Nayan Rahasya (2024)
7. Kakababu film series (6 films)
  - With Samit Bhanja as Kakababu (1 film)
    - Sabuj Dwiper Raja (1979)
  - With Sabyasachi Chakrabarty as Kakababu (2 films)
    - Kakababu Here Gelen? (1995)
    - Ek Tukro Chand (2001)
  - With Prosenjit Chatterjee as Kakababu (4 films)
    - Mishawr Rawhoshyo (2013)
    - Yeti Obhijaan (2017)
    - Kakababur Protyaborton (2022)
    - Vijaynagar'er Hirey (2025)
8. Banchha film series (2 films)
  - Banchharamer Bagan (1980)
  - Banchha Elo Phire (2016)
9. Anjan-Mamata film series (2 films)
  - Kharij (1982)
  - Palan (2023)
10. Agantuk film series (2 films)
  - Agantuk (1991)
  - Agantuker Pore (2016)
11. Fatakeshto film series (2 films)
  - MLA Fatakeshto (2006)
  - Minister Fatakeshto (2007)
12. The Bongs film series (2 films)
  - The Bong Connection (2006)
  - The Bongs Again (2017)
13. Cross Connection film series (2 films)
  - Cross Connection (2009)
  - Cross Connection 2 (2015)
14. Srijit Mukherji's Cop Universe (4 films)
  - Baishe Srabon (2011)
  - Vinci Da (2019)
  - Dwitiyo Purush (2020)
  - Dawshom Awbotaar (2023)
15. Society film series (2 films)
  - Hemlock Society (2012)
  - Killbill Society (2025)
16. Gogol film series (2 films)
  - Goyenda Gogol (2013)
  - Gogoler Kirti (2014)
17. Boss film series (2 films)
  - Boss: Born to Rule (2013)
  - Boss 2: Back to Rule (2017)
18. Chander Pahar film series (2 films)
  - Chander Pahar (2013)
  - Amazon Obhijaan (2017)
19. Agnee film series (2 films) (Note: While the first installment was produced in Bangladesh, the sequel is an Indo-Bangladesh joint production.)
  - Agnee (2014)
  - Agnee 2 (2015)
20. Goenda Shabor film series (4 films)
  - Ebar Shabor (2015)
  - Eagoler Chokh (2016)
  - Aschhe Abar Shabor (2018)
  - Tirandaj Shabor (2022)
21. Kiriti Roy film series (4 films)
  - With Indraneil Sengupta as Kiriti Roy (2 films)
    - Kiriti O Kalo Bhromor (2016)
    - Nilacholey Kiriti (2018)
  - With Chiranjeet Chakraborty as Kiriti Roy (1 film)
    - Kiriti Roy (2016)
  - With Priyanshu Chatterjee as Kiriti Roy (1 film)
    - Ebong Kiriti (2017)
22. Rahasyavedi Basab film series (2 films)
  - Ebar Goyenda Basab (2017)
  - Rahasyavedi Basab (2018)
23. Detective Chandrakanta film series (2 films)
  - Shororipu (2016)
  - Shororipu 2: Jotugriho (2021)
24. Padma-Naseer film series (2 films)
  - Bishorjan (2017)
  - Bijoya (2019)
25. Jawkher Dhan film series (3 films)
  - Jawker Dhan (2017)
  - Sagardwipey Jawker Dhan (2019)
  - Sonar Kellay Jawker Dhan (2025)
26. Haami film series (2 films)
  - Haami (2018)
  - Haami 2 (2022)
27. Sonada film series (4 films)
  - Guptodhoner Sandhane (2018)
  - Durgeshgorer Guptodhon (2019)
  - Karnasubarner Guptodhon (2022)
  - Saptadingar Guptodhon (2026)
28. Bibaho Obhijaan film series (2 films)
  - Bibaho Obhijaan (2019)
  - Abar Bibaho Obhijaan (2023)
29. Mitin Mashi film series (3 films)
  - Mitin Mashi (2019)
  - Jongole Mitin Mashi (2023)
  - Ekti Khunir Sandhane Mitin (2025)
30. Cheeni film series (2 films)
  - Cheeni (2020)
  - Cheeni 2 (2023)
31. Ekenbabu film series (4 films)
  - The Eken (2022)
  - The Eken: Ruddhaswas Rajasthan (2023)
  - The Eken: Benaras e Bibhishika (2025)
  - The Eken: Kerala-E Kurukshetra (2026)
32. Raktabeej film series (2 films)
  - Raktabeej (2023)
  - Raktabeej 2 (2025)
33. Hawa Bodol film series (2 films)
  - Hawa Bodol (2013)
  - Abar Hawa Bodol (2026)
34. Ghoton film series (2 films)
  - Rainbow Jelly (2018)
  - Pokkhirajer Dim (2025)
35. Ardhangini film series (2 films)
  - Ardhangini (2023)
  - Aajo Ardhangini (2026)

=== Common diegetic world ===
1. Calcutta trilogy by Satyajit Ray (3 films)
  - Pratidwandi (1970)
  - Seemabaddha (1971)
  - Jana Aranya (1976)
2. Calcutta trilogy by Mrinal Sen (3 films)
  - Interview (1971)
  - Calcutta 71 (1972)
  - Padatik (1973)
3. Bou film series (5 films)
  - Choto Bou (1988)
  - Mejo Bou (1995)
  - Boro Bou (1997)
  - Sundar Bou (1999)
  - Sejo Bou (2003)
4. Chirodini Tumi Je Amar film series (2 films)
  - Chirodini Tumi Je Amar (2008)
  - Chirodini Tumi Je Amar 2 (2014)
5. Challenge film series (2 films)
  - Challenge (2009)
  - Challenge 2 (2012)
6. Amanush film series (2 films)
  - Amanush (2010)
  - Amanush 2 (2015)
7. Paglu film series (2 films)
  - Paglu (2011)
  - Paglu 2 (2012)
8. Khoka film series (2 films)
  - Khokababu (2012)
  - Khoka 420 (2013)
9. Prem Amar film series (2 films)
  - Prem Amar (2009)
  - Prem Amar 2 (2019)
10. Bela Sheshe film series (2 films)
  - Bela Seshe (2015)
  - Belashuru (2022)

== Bhojpuri ==
=== Story-line / Character followup ===
1. Bairi Kangana film series (2 films)
  - Bairi Kangana (1982)
  - Bairi Kangana 2 (2018)
1. Pandit Ji Batai Na Biyah Kab Hoi film series (2 films)
  - Pandit Ji Batai Na Biyah Kab Hoi (2005)
  - Pandit Ji Batai Na Biyah Kab Hoi 2 (2015)
1. Ganga series (2 films)
  - Ganga (2006)
  - Gangotri (2007)
1. Nirahua Rikshawala series (2 films)
  - Nirahua Rickshawala (2007)
  - Nirahua Rickshawala 2 (2015)
1. Pratigya film series (2 films)
  - Pratigya (2008)
  - Pratigya 2 (2014)
1. Darar film series (2 films)
  - Darar (2010)
  - Darar 2 (2018)
1. Sajan Chale Sasural film series (2 films)
  - Sajan Chale Sasural (2011)
  - Sajan Chale Sasural 2 (2016)
1. Truck Driver film series
  - Truck Driver (2011)
  - Truck Driver 2 (2016)
1. Ek Duje Ke Liye film series
  - Ek Duje Ke Liye (2012)
  - Ek Duje Ke Liye 2 (2021)
1. Nirahua Hindustani film series (3 films)
  - Nirahua Hindustani (2014)
  - Nirahua Hindustani 2 (2017)
  - Nirahua Hindustani 3 (2018)
1. Laadla film series (2 films)
  - Laadla (2015)
  - Laadla 2 (2023)
1. Dulhan Chahi Pakistan Se (2 films)
  - Dulhan Chahi Pakistan Se (2016)
  - Dulhan Chahi Pakistan Se 2 (2018)
1. Mehandi Laga Ke Rakhna film series (3 films)
  - Mehandi Laga Ke Rakhna (2017)
  - Mehandi Laga Ke Rakhna 2 (2018)
  - Mehandi Laga Ke Rakhna 3 (2020)
1. Sangharsh film series
  - Sangharsh (2018)
  - Sangharsh 2 (2023)
1. Vivah film series (2 films)
  - Vivah (2019)
  - Vivah 2 (2021)

=== Common diegetic world ===
1. Nirahua Chalal film series (3 films)
  - Nirahua Chalal Sasural (2008)
  - Nirahua Chalal Sasural 2 (2016)
  - Nirahua Chalal London (2019)

== Bodo ==
=== Story-line / Character followup ===
1. Hainamuli film series (7 films)
  - Hainamuli (2009)
  - Hainamuli 2 (2010)
  - Hainamuli 3 (2011)
  - Hainamuli 4 (2013)
  - Hainamuli 5 (2009)
  - Hainamuli 6 (2014)
  - Hainamuli 7 (2019)

== Chhattisgarhi ==
=== Story-line / Character followup ===
1. Mor Chhainha Bhuinya film series (3 films)
  - Mor Chhainha Bhuinya (2000)
  - Mor Chhainha Bhuinya 2 (2024)
  - Mor Chhainha Bhuinya 3 (2025)
2. Mayaa film series
  - Mayaa (2009)
  - Mayaa 2 (2019)
3. B.A. film series (3 films)
  - B.A. First Year (2013)
  - B.A. Second Year (2017)
  - B.A. Final Year (2024)
4. Raja Chhattisgarhiya film series (2 films)
  - Raja Chhattisgarhiya (2015)
  - Raja Chhattisgarhiya 2 (2016)
5. 3 Than Bhokwa film series (2 films)
  - 3 Than Bhokwa (2017)
  - 3 Than Bhokwa Returns (2021)

== Deccani ==
=== Story-line / Character followup ===
1. The Angrez film series (2 films)
  - The Angrez (2005)
  - The Angrez 2 (2015)
2. Hyderabad Nawabs film series (2 films)
  - Hyderabad Nawabs (2006)
  - Hyderabad Nawabs 2 (2019)
3. Stepney film series (2 films)
  - Stepney (2014)
  - Stepney 2 Returns (2017)

=== Common diegetic world ===
1. Gullu Dada film series (7 films)
  - FM Fun Aur Masti (2007)
  - Gullu Dada Returns (2010)
  - Gullu Dada 3 (2012)
  - Gullu Dada 4 (2013)
  - Gangs of Hyderabad (2015)
  - Gullu Dada 5 (2017)
  - Inspector Gullu (2017)

== Gujarati ==
=== Story-line / Character followup ===
1. Maiyar Ma Manadu Nathi Lagtu film series (2 films)
  - Maiyar Ma Manadu Nathi Lagtu (2001)
  - Maiyar Ma Manadu Nathi Lagtu Part II (2008)
2. Shikaar film series (2 films)
  - Shikaar - A Murder Mystery (2012)
  - Shikaar 2 (2017)
3. Chal Man Jeetva Jaiye film series (2 films)
  - Chal Man Jeetva Jaiye (2017)
  - Chal Man Jeetva Jaiye 2 (2023)
4. Rocky in Risk film series (2 films)
  - Rocky in Risk (2022)
  - Rocky in Risk 2 (2023)
5. Vash film series (2 films)
  - Vash (2023)
  - Vash: Level 2 (2025)

=== Common diegetic world ===
1. Gujjubhai film series (2 films)
  - Gujjubhai the Great (2015)
  - GujjuBhai - Most Wanted (2018)
2. Fakt Maate film series (2 films)
  - Fakt Mahilao Maate (2022)
  - Fakt Purusho Maate (2024)

== Haryanvi ==
=== Story-line / Character followup ===
1. Chandrawal film series (2 films)
  - Chandrawal (1982)
  - Chandrawal 2 (2012)

=== Common diegetic world ===
1. Chora film series (2 films)
  - Chora Jaat Ka (1985)
  - Chora Haryane Ka (1987)

== Hindi ==
=== Story-line / Character followup ===
1. Hunterwali film series (2 films)
  - Hunterwali (1935)
  - Hunterwali Ki Beti (1943)
2. Jewel Thief film series (2 films)
  - Jewel Thief (1967)
  - Return of Jewel Thief (1996)
3. Arun film series (2 films)
  - Ankhiyon Ke Jharokhon Se (1978)
  - Jaana Pehchana (2011)
4. Don film series (3 films)
  - Don (1978)
  - Don: The Chase Begins Again (2006) (Note: It is the remake of the original Don film made in 1978.)
  - Don 2: The King is Back (2011)
  - Don 3 (TBA)
5. Gunmaster G9 film series (2 films)
  - Surakksha (1979)
  - Wardat (1981)
6. Nagin film series (2 films)
  - Nagina (1986)
  - Nigahen: Nagina Part II (1989)
7. Ghayal film series (2 films)
  - Ghayal (1990)
  - Ghayal: Once Again (2016)
8. Sadak film series (2 films)
  - Sadak (1991)
  - Sadak 2 (2020)
9. Border film series (2 films)
  - Border (1997)
  - Border 2 (2026)
10. Hyderabad Blues film series (2 films)
  - Hyderabad Blues (1998)
  - Hyderabad Blues 2 (2004)
11. Gangster film series (4 films)
  - Satya (1998)
  - Company (2002)
  - D (2005)
  - Satya 2 (2013) (Note: Shot simultaneously in Hindi and Telugu languages.)
12. Raghu film series (2 films)
  - Vaastav (1999)
  - Hathyar (2002)
13. Hera Pheri film series (2 films)
  - Hera Pheri (2000)
  - Phir Hera Pheri (2006)
14. Style-Xcuse Me film series (2 films)
  - Style (2001)
  - Xcuse Me (2003)
15. Gadar film series (2 films)
  - Gadar: Ek Prem Katha (2001)
  - Gadar 2: The Katha Continues (2023)
16. Krrish film series (3 films)
  - Koi... Mil Gaya (2003)
  - Krrish (2006)
  - Krrish 3 (2013)
17. Dhoom Trilogy (3 films)
  - Dhoom (2004)
  - Dhoom 2 (2006)
  - Dhoom 3 (2013)
18. Ab Tak Chhappan film series (2 films)
  - Ab Tak Chhappan (2004)
  - Ab Tak Chhappan 2 (2015)
19. Sarkar Trilogy (3 films)
  - Sarkar (2005)
  - Sarkar Raj (2008)
  - Sarkar 3 (2017)
20. Bunty Aur Babli film series (2 films)
  - Bunty Aur Babli (2005)
  - Bunty Aur Babli 2 (2021)
21. Tom, Dick and Harry film series (2 films)
  - Tom, Dick, and Harry (2006)
  - Tom, Dick, and Harry, Rock Again! (2009)
22. Bheja Fry film series (2 films)
  - Bheja Fry (2007)
  - Bheja Fry 2 (2011)
23. Welcome series (2 films)
  - Welcome (2007)
  - Welcome Back (2015)
  - Welcome to the Jungle (2026)
24. Dhamaal Tetralogy (4 films)
  - Dhamaal (2007)
  - Double Dhamaal (2011)
  - Total Dhamaal (2019)
  - Dhamaal 4 (2026)
25. Ghatothkach film series (2 films)
  - Ghatothkach (2008)
  - Ghatothkach 2 (2013)
26. Phoonk film series (2 films)
  - Phoonk (2008)
  - Phoonk 2 (2010)
27. Jumbo film series (2 films)
  - Jumbo (2008)
  - Jumbo 2: The Return of the Big Elephant (2011)
28. Bhoothnath film series (2 films)
  - Bhoothnath (2008)
  - Bhoothnath Returns (2014)
29. Rock On!! film series (2 films)
  - Rock On!! (2008)
  - Rock On II (2016)
30. Race Trilogy (3 films)
  - Race (2008)
  - Race 2 (2013)
  - Race 3 (2018)
31. Rakta Charitra film series (2 films)
  - Rakta Charitra (2010)
  - Rakt Charitra: Part II (2010)
32. Once Upon A Time in Mumbaai film series (2 films)
  - Once Upon A Time in Mumbaai (2010)
  - Once Upon Ay Time in Mumbai Dobaara! (2013)
33. Ishqiya film series (2 films)
  - Ishqiya (2010)
  - Dedh Ishqiya (2014)
34. Dunno Y... film series (2 films)
  - Dunno Y... Na Jaane Kyon (2010)
  - Dunno Y2... Life Is a Moment (2015)
35. Dabangg Trilogy (3 films)
  - Dabangg (2010)
  - Dabangg 2 (2012)
  - Dabangg 3 (2019)
36. Khichdi film series (2 films)
  - Khichdi: The Movie (2010)
  - Khichdi 2: Mission Paanthukistan (2023)
37. Ragini MMS film series (3 films)
  - Ragini MMS (2011)
  - Ragini MMS 2 (2014)
  - Ragini 3 (TBA)
38. Tanu Weds Manu film series (2 films)
  - Tanu Weds Manu (2011)
  - Tanu Weds Manu: Returns (2015)
39. Force film series (2 films)
  - Force (2011)
  - Force 2 (2016)
  - Force 3 (TBA)
40. Saheb, Biwi Aur Gangster film Trilogy (3 films)
  - Saheb, Biwi Aur Gangster (2011)
  - Saheb, Biwi Aur Gangster Returns (2013)
  - Saheb, Biwi Aur Gangster 3 (2018)
41. Rohit Shetty's Cop Universe (5 films)
  - Singham (2011) (Note: It is a remake of the Tamil film Singam)
  - Singham Returns (2014)
  - Simmba (2018)
  - Sooryavanshi (2021)
  - Singham Again (2024)
42. Chhota Bheem film series (5 films)
  - Chhota Bheem and the Curse of Damyaan (2012)
  - Chhota Bheem and the Throne of Bali (2013)
  - Chhota Bheem: Himalayan Adventure (2016)
  - Chhota Bheem Kung Fu Dhamaka (2019)
  - Chhota Bheem and the Curse of Damyaan (2024)
43. Gangs of Wasseypur film series (2 films)
  - Gangs of Wasseypur – Part 1 (2012)
  - Gangs of Wasseypur – Part 2 (2012)
44. Oh My God film series (2 films)
  - OMG – Oh My God! (2012)
  - OMG 2 (2023)
45. Student of the Year Series (2 films)
  - Student of the Year (2012)
  - Student of the Year 2 (2019)
46. YRF Spy Universe (7 Films)
  - Ek Tha Tiger (2012)
  - Tiger Zinda Hai (2017)
  - War (2019)
  - Pathaan (2023)
  - Tiger 3 (2023)
  - War 2 (2025)
  - Alpha (2026)
47. Vishwaroop film series (2 films) (Note: Shot simultaneously in Hindi and Tamil languages)
  - Vishwaroop (2013)
  - Vishwaroop II (2018)
48. Jolly LLB film series (3 films)
  - Jolly LLB (2013)
  - Jolly LLB 2 (2017)
  - Jolly LLB 3 (2025)
49. Commando Trilogy (3 films)
  - Commando: A One Man Army (2013)
  - Commando 2: The Black Money Trail (2017)
  - Commando 3 (2019)
50. Fukrey film Trilogy (3 films)
  - Fukrey (2013)
  - Fukrey Returns (2017)
  - Fukrey 3 (2023)
51. Mardaani Trilogy (3 films)
  - Mardaani (2014)
  - Mardaani 2 (2019)
  - Mardaani 3 (2026)
52. Baby film series (2 films)
  - Baby (2015)
  - Naam Shabana (2017) (Note: A spin-off prequel to Baby.)
53. Drishyam film series (3 films)
  - Drishyam (2015)
  - Drishyam 2 (2022)
  - Drishyam: The Conclusion (2026)
54. Happy Bhag Jayegi film series (2 films)
  - Happy Bhag Jayegi (2016)
  - Happy Phirr Bhag Jayegi (2018)
55. Maddock Horror Comedy Universe (5 films)
  - Stree (2018)
  - Bhediya (2022)
  - Munjya (2024)
  - Stree 2 (2024)
  - Thamma (2025)
56. Raid film series (2 films)
  - Raid (2018)
  - Raid 2 (2025)
57. De De Pyaar De (2 films)
  - De De Pyaar De (2019)
  - De De Pyaar De 2 (2025)
58. Khuda Haafiz film series (2 films)
  - Khuda Haafiz (2020)
  - Khuda Haafiz: Chapter 2 – Agni Pariksha (2022)
59. Chhorii film series (2 films)
  - Chhorii (2021)
  - Chhorii 2 (2025)
60. Haseen Dillruba film series (2 films)
  - Haseen Dillruba (2021)
  - Phir Aayi Hasseen Dillruba (2024)
61. Kaagaz film series (2 films)
  - Kaagaz (2021)
  - Kaagaz 2 (2024)
62. Silence film series (2 films)
  - Silence... Can You Hear It? (2021)
  - Silence 2: The Night Owl Bar Shootout (2024)
63. Vadh film series (2 films)
  - Vadh (2022)
  - Vadh 2 (2026)
64. Dhurandhar franchise (2 films)
  - Dhurandhar (2025)
  - Dhurandhar: The Revenge (2026)
65. Khosla Ka Ghosla film series (2 films)
  - Khosla Ka Ghosla (2006)
  - Khosla Ka Ghosla 2 (2026)

=== Common diegetic world ===
1. Love in Trilogy (3 films)
  - Love in Simla (1960)
  - Love in Tokyo (1966)
  - Love in Bombay (2013)
2. Khosla-Sadhana Trilogy (3 films)
  - Woh Kaun Thi? (1964)
  - Mera Saaya (1966)
  - Anita (1967)
3. Basu Bhattacharya Trilogy (3 films)
  - Anubhav (1971)
  - Avishkaar (1973)
  - Griha (1979)
4. Aashiqui film series (2 films)
  - Aashiqui (1990)
  - Aashiqui 2 (2013)
5. Khiladi film series (8 films)
  - Khiladi (1992)
  - Main Khiladi Tu Anari (1994)
  - Sabse Bada Khiladi (1995)
  - Khiladiyon Ka Khiladi (1996)
  - Mr. and Mrs. Khiladi (1997)
  - International Khiladi (1999)
  - Khiladi 420 (2000)
  - Khiladi 786 (2012)
6. No. 1 (film series) (9 films)
  - Starring Govinda (6 films)
    - Coolie No. 1 (1995)
    - Hero No. 1 (1997)
    - Aunty No. 1 (1998)
    - Anari No. 1 (1999)
    - Beti No. 1 (2000)
    - Jodi No. 1 (2001)
  - Directed by David Dhawan (6 films)
    - Coolie No. 1 (1995)
    - Hero No. 1 (1997)
    - Biwi No.1 (1999)
    - Jodi No. 1 (2001)
    - Shaadi No. 1 (2005)
    - Coolie No. 1 (2020)
  - Produced by Vashu Bhagnani (6 films)
    - Coolie No. 1 (1995)
    - Hero No. 1 (1997)
    - Anari No.1 (1999)
    - Biwi No.1 (1999)
    - Shaadi No. 1 (2005)
    - Coolie No. 1 (2020)
7. Elements trilogy (3 films)
  - Fire (1996)
  - Earth (1998)
  - Water (2005)
8. Sudhir Mishra Thriller film series (2 films)
  - Is Raat Ki Subah Nahin (1996)
  - Yeh Saali Zindagi (2011)
9. Judwaa film series (2 films)
  - Judwaa (1997)
  - Judwaa 2 (2017)
10. Satya film series (2 films)
  - Satya (1998)
  - Satya 2 (2013)
11. Tum Bin film series (2 films)
  - Tum Bin (2001)
  - Tum Bin II (2016)
12. Deewana Paagal film series (2 films)
  - Awara Paagal Deewana (2002)
  - Deewane Huye Paagal (2005)
13. Raaz Tetralogy (4 films)
  - Raaz (2002)
  - Raaz: The Mystery Continues (2009)
  - Raaz 3D: The Third Dimension (2012)
  - Raaz: Reboot (2016)
14. Darna Mana/Zaroori Hai film series (2 films)
  - Darna Mana Hai (2003)
  - Darna Zaroori Hai (2006)
15. Munna Bhai film series (2 films)
  - Munna Bhai M.B.B.S (2003)
  - Lage Raho Munna Bhai (2006)
16. Bhoot film series (2 films)
  - Bhoot (2003)
  - Bhoot Returns (2012)
17. Jism film series (2 films)
  - Jism (2003)
  - Jism 2 (2012)
18. Gangaajal film series (2 films)
  - Gangaajal (2003)
  - Jai Gangaajal (2016)
19. Hungama film series (2 films)
  - Hungama (2003)
  - Hungama 2 (2021)
20. Ishq Vishk film series (2 films)
  - Ishq Vishk (2003)
  - Ishq Vishk Rebound (2024)
21. Andaaz film series (2 films)
  - Andaaz (2003)
  - Andaaz 2 (2025)
22. Murder Trilogy (3 films)
  - Murder (2004)
  - Murder 2 (2011)
  - Murder 3 (2013)
23. Masti Tetralogy (4 films)
  - Masti (2004)
  - Grand Masti (2013)
  - Great Grand Masti (2016)
  - Mastiii 4 (2025)
24. Julie film series (2 films)
  - Julie (2004)
  - Julie 2 (2017)
25. Tauba Tauba film series
  - Tauba Tauba (2004)
  - Phir Tauba Tauba (2008)
26. Kyaa Kool Hain Hum Trilogy (3 films)
  - Kyaa Kool Hai Hum (2005)
  - Kyaa Super Kool Hain Hum (2012)
  - Kyaa Kool Hain Hum 3 (2016)
27. Hanuman Trilogy (3 films)
  - Hanuman (2005)
  - Return of Hanuman (2007) (Note: However, the starting notifications of the film declare it as an original work and not as a sequel to any previous film.)
  - Hanuman: Da' Damdaar (2017)
28. Malamaal film series (2 films)
  - Malamaal Weekly (2006)
  - Kamaal Dhamaal Malamaal (2012)
29. Side Effects film series (2 films)
  - Pyaar Ke Side Effects (2006)
  - Shaadi Ke Side Effects (2014)
30. Aksar film series (2 films)
  - Aksar (2006)
  - Aksar 2 (2017)
31. Golmaal film series (5 films)
  - Golmaal (2006)
  - Golmaal Returns (2008)
  - Golmaal 3 (2010)
  - Golmaal Again (2017)
  - Cirkus (2022)
  - Golmaal 5
32. Metro film series (2 films)
  - Life in a... Metro (2007)
  - Metro... In Dino (2025)
33. My Friend Ganesha Tetralogy (4 films)
  - My Friend Ganesha (2007)
  - My Friend Ganesha 2 (2009)
  - My Friend Ganesha 3 (2010)
  - My Friend Ganesha 4 (2013)
34. Shootout film series (2 films)
  - Shootout at Lokhandwala (2007)
  - Shootout at Wadala (2013)
35. Bal Ganesh Trilogy (3 films)
  - Bal Ganesh (2007)
  - Bal Ganesh 2 (2009)
  - Bal Ganesh 3 (2015)
36. Surroor film series (2 films)
  - Aap Kaa Surroor (2007)
  - Teraa Surroor (2016)
37. Namastey film series (2 films)
  - Namastey London (2007)
  - Namaste England (2018)
38. Bhool Bhulaiyaa film series (4 films)
  - Bhool Bhulaiyaa (2007)
  - Bhool Bhulaiyaa 2 (2022)
  - Bhool Bhulaiyaa 3 (2024)
39. Awarapan film series (2 films)
  - Awarapan (2007)
  - Awarapan 2 (2026)
40. 1920 Pentalogy (5 films)
  - 1920 (2008)
  - 1920: Evil Returns (2012)
  - 1920: London (2016)
  - 1921 (2018)
  - 1920: Horrors of the Heart (2023)
41. Love Aaj Kal film series (2 films)
  - Love Aaj Kal (2009)
  - Love Aaj Kal (2020)
42. Haunted film series (2 films)
  - Haunted – 3D (2011)
  - Haunted 3D: Echoes of the Past (2026)
43. Jannat film series (2 films)
  - Jannat (2008)
  - Jannat 2 (2012)
  - Jannat 3 (TBA)
44. Singh Is Kinng film series (2 films)
  - Singh Is Kinng (2008)
  - Singh Is Bliing (2015)
45. Taare Zameen Par film series (2 films)
  - Taare Zameen Par (2008)
  - Sitaare Zameen Par (2025)
46. Tere Bin Laden film series (2 films)
  - Tere Bin Laden (2010)
  - Tere Bin Laden: Dead or Alive (2016)
47. Atithi film series (2 films)
  - Atithi Tum Kab Jaoge? (2010)
  - Guest iin London (2017)
48. Housefull Pentalogy (5 films)
  - Housefull (2010)
  - Housefull 2 (2012)
  - Housefull 3 (2016)
  - Housefull 4 (2019)
  - Housefull 5 (2025)
49. Love Sex Aur Dhokha film series (2 films)
  - Love Sex Aur Dhokha (2010)
  - Love Sex Aur Dhokha 2 (2024)
50. Pyaar Ka Punchnama film series (2 films)
  - Pyaar Ka Punchnama (2011)
  - Pyaar Ka Punchnama 2 (2015)
51. Yamla Pagla Deewana Trilogy (3 films)
  - Yamla Pagla Deewana (2011)
  - Yamla Pagla Deewana 2 (2013)
  - Yamla Pagla Deewana: Phir Se (2018)
52. Hate Story Tetralogy (4 films)
  - Hate Story (2012)
  - Hate Story 2 (2014)
  - Hate Story 3 (2015)
  - Hate Story 4 (2018)
53. Kahaani franchise (3 films)
  - Kahaani (2012)
  - Kahaani 2: Durga Rani Singh (2016)
  - Bob Biswas (2021)
54. Son of Sardaar film series (2 films)
  - Son of Sardaar (2012)
  - Son of Sardaar 2 (2025)
55. B.A. Pass Trilogy (3 films)
  - B.A. Pass (2013)
  - B.A. Pass 2 (2017)
  - B.A. Pass 3 (2021)
56. ABCD film series (2 films)
  - ABCD: Any Body Can Dance (2013)
  - ABCD 2 (2015) (Note: Street Dancer 3D (2020), originally titled ABCD 3, was planned as a sequel but later released independently after the original producers pulled out.)
57. Anthology Tetralogy (4 films)
  - Bombay Talkies (2013)
  - Lust Stories (2018)
  - Ghost Stories (2020)
  - Lust Stories 2 (2023)
58. Dulhania film series (2 films)
  - Humpty Sharma Ki Dulhania (2014)
  - Badrinath Ki Dulhania (2017)
59. Heropanti film series (2 films)
  - Heropanti (2014)
  - Heropanti 2 (2022)
60. Ek Villain film series (2 films)
  - Ek Villain (2014)
  - Ek Villain Returns (2022)
61. The Xposé film series (2 films)
  - The Xposé (2014)
  - Badass Ravi Kumar (2025)
62. Yaariyan film series (2 films)
  - Yaariyan (2014)
  - Yaariyan 2 (2023)
63. MSG film series (4 films)
  - The Messenger films (2 films)
    - MSG: The Messenger (2015)
    - MSG-2 The Messenger (2015)
  - The Lion Heart films (2 films)
    - MSG: The Warrior Lion Heart (2016)
    - Hind Ka Napak Ko Jawab: MSG Lion Heart 2 (2017)
64. Baaghi Tetralogy (4 films)
  - Baaghi (2016)
  - Baaghi 2 (2018)
  - Baaghi 3 (2020)
  - Baaghi 4 (2025)
65. Medium film series (2 films)
  - Hindi Medium (2017)
  - Angrezi Medium (2020)
66. Shubh Mangal Saavdhan film series (2 films)
  - Shubh Mangal Saavdhan (2017)
  - Shubh Mangal Zyada Saavdhan (2020)
67. Badhaai film series (2 films)
  - Badhaai Ho (2018)
  - Badhaai Do (2022)
68. Dhadak film series (2 films)
  - Dhadak (2018)
  - Dhadak 2 (2025)
69. Satyameva Jayate film series (2 films)
  - Satyameva Jayate (2018)
  - Satyameva Jayate 2 (2021)
70. Vasant Bala film series (2 films)
  - Mard Ko Dard Nahi Hota (2018)
  - Monica, O My Darling (2022)
71. Dream Girl film series (2 films)
  - Dream Girl (2019)
  - Dream Girl 2 (2023)
72. Files Trilogy (3 films)
  - The Tashkent Files (2019)
  - The Kashmir Files (2022)
  - The Bengal Files (2025)
73. Newz film series (2 films)
  - Good Newwz (2019)
  - Bad Newz (2024)
74. Kesari film series (2 films)
  - Kesari (2019)
  - Kesari Chapter 2 (2025)
75. Pati Patni Aur Woh film series (2 films)
  - Pati Patni Aur Woh (2019)
  - Pati Patni Aur Woh Do (2026)
76. Confidential film series (2 films)
  - London Confidential (2020)
  - Lahore Confidential (2021)
77. Ginny Weds Sunny film series (2 films)
  - Ginny Weds Sunny (2020)
  - Ginny Wedss Sunny 2 (2026)

== Kannada ==
=== Story-line / Character followup ===
1. James Bond-type series (4 Films)
  - Jedara Bale (1968)
  - Goa Dalli CID 999 (1968)
  - Operation Jackpot Nalli C.I.D 999 (1969)
  - Operation Diamond Racket (1978)
2. Gandhada Gudi film series (2 Films)
  - Gandhada Gudi (1973)
  - Gandhada Gudi Part 2 (1994)
3. Antha film series (2 Films)
  - Antha (1981)
  - Operation Antha (1995)
4. Sangliyana film series (3 Films)
  - Sangliyana (1988)
  - S. P. Sangliyana Part 2 (1988)
  - Sangliyana Part 3 (1997)
5. Upendra film series (2 films)
  - Upendra (1999)
  - Uppi 2 (2015)
6. Kurigalu Saar Kurigalu film series (4 films)
  - Kurigalu Saar Kurigalu (2001)
  - Kothigalu Saar Kothigalu (2001)
  - Katthegalu Saar Katthegalu (2002)
  - Chathrigalu Saar Chathrigalu (2013)
7. Kotigobba film series (3 Films)
  - Kotigobba (2001)
  - Kotigobba 2 (2016)
  - Kotigobba 3 (2021)
8. Rakhta Kanneeru film series (2 films)
  - Rakhta Kanneeru (2003)
  - Katariveera Surasundarangi (2012)
9. Nagavalli film series (2 films)
  - Apthamitra (2004)
  - Aptharakshaka (2010)
10. Deadly film series (2 films)
  - Deadly Soma (2005)
  - Deadly-2 (2010)
11. Jogi film series (2 films)
  - Jogi (2005)
  - Jogayya (2011)
12. Care of Footpath film series (2 films)
  - Care of Footpath (2006)
  - Care of Footpath 2 (2008)
13. Mungaru Male film series (2 films)
  - Mungaru Male (2006)
  - Mungaru Male 2 (2016)
14. Gaalipata film series (2 films)
  - Gaalipata (2008)
  - Gaalipata 2 (2022)
15. Krishnan film series (2 films)
  - Krishnan Love Story (2010)
  - Krishnan Marriage Story (2011)
16. Dandupalya film series (4 films)
  - Dandupalya (2012)
  - Dandupalya 2 (2017)
  - Dandupalya 3 (2018)
  - Dandupalya 4 (2019)
17. Rambo film series (2 films)
  - Rambo (2012)
  - Raambo 2 (2018)
18. Kalpana film series (2 films) (Note: It is a remake of the Kanchana film series.)
  - Kalpana (2012)
  - Kalpana 2 (2016)
19. Bhajarangi series (2 films)
  - Bhajarangi (2013)
  - Bhajarangi 2 (2021)
20. Drishya film series (2 films)
  - Drishya (2014)
  - Drishya 2 (2021)
21. Adyaksha film series (2 films)
  - Adyaksha (2014)
  - Upadhyaksha (2024)
22. Namo Bhootatma film series (2 films)
  - Namo Bhootatma (2014)
  - Namo Bhootatma 2 (2023)
23. K.G.F. film series (3 films)
  - K.G.F: Chapter 1 (2018)
  - K.G.F: Chapter 2 (2022)
  - K.G.F: Chapter 3 (TBA)
24. Love Mocktail film series (3 films)
  - Love Mocktail (2020)
  - Love Mocktail 2 (2022)
  - Love Mocktail 3 (2026)
25. Shivaji Surathkal film series (2 films)
  - Shivaji Surathkal (2020)
  - Shivaji Surathkal 2 (2023)
26. Kantara film series (3 films)
  - Kantara (2022)
  - Kantara: Chapter 1 (2025)
  - Kantara: Chapter 2 (2027)
27. Avatara Purusha film series (2 films)
  - Avatara Purusha (2022)
  - Avatara Purusha 2 (2024)
28. Totapuri film series (2 films)
  - Totapuri: Chapter 1 (2022)
  - Totapuri: Chapter 2 (2023)
29. Sapta Sagaradaache Ello film series (2 films)
  - Sapta Sagaradaache Ello - Side A (2023)
  - Sapta Sagaradaache Ello - Side B (2023)

=== Common diegetic world ===
1. Ganesha film series (6 films)
  - Ganeshana Maduve (1990)
  - Gauri Ganesha (1991)
  - Ganesha Subramanya (1992)
  - Ganeshana Galate (1995)
  - Ganesha I Love You (1997)
  - Ganesha Matte Banda (2008)
2. Golmaal film series (3 films)
  - Golmaal Radhakrishna (1990)
  - Golmaal Part 2 (1991)
  - Samsaaradalli Golmaal (2012)
3. Police Story film series (3 films)
  - Police Story (1996)
  - Police Story 2 (2007)
  - Police Story 3 (2011)
4. Huchcha film series (2 films)
  - Huchcha (2001) (Note: It is the remake of the 1999 Tamil film Sethu.)
  - Huccha 2 (2018) (Note: It is the remake of the 2005 Tamil film Raam.)
5. Kariya film series (2 films)
  - Kariya (2003)
  - Kariya 2 (2017)
6. Taj Mahal film series (2 films)
  - Taj Mahal (2008)
  - Taj Mahal 2 (2014)
7. Savaari film series (2 films)
  - Savaari (2009) (Note: It is the remake of the 2008 Telugu film Gamyam.)
  - Savaari 2 (2014)
8. Olave Mandara film series (2 films)
  - Olave Mandara (2011)
  - Olave Mandara 2 (2023)
9. Kempegowda film series (2 films)
  - Kempe Gowda (2011) (Note: It is the remake of the 2010 Tamil film Singam.)
  - Kempe Gowda 2 (2019)
10. Kendasampige film series (2 films)
  - Kendasampige (2016)
  - Popcorn Monkey Tiger (2020)
11. Birbal film series (2 films)
  - Birbal Trilogy (2019)
  - Ghost (2023)
12. Victory film series (2 films)
  - Victory (2013)
  - Victory 2 (2018)

== Meitei / Manipuri ==
=== Story-line / Character followup ===
1. Nungshi Feijei film series (2 films)
  - Nungshi Feijei (2015)
  - Nungshi Feijei 2 (2016)
2. Chanu IPS film series (2 films)
  - Chanu IPS (2017)
  - Chanu IPS 2 (2019)

== Malayalam ==
=== Story-line / Character followup ===
1. Aana Valarthiya film series (2 films)
  - Aana Valarthiya Vanampadi (1959)
  - Aana Valarthiya Vanampadiyude Makan (1971)
2. Othenan film series (3 films)
  - Thacholi Othenan (1964)
  - Othenante Makan (1970)
  - Kadathanadan Ambadi (1990)
3. Kattuthulasi film series (2 films)
  - Kattuthulasi (1965)
  - Thenaruvi (1973)
4. Kayamkulam Kochunni film series (2 films)
  - Kayamkulam Kochunni (1966)
  - Kayamkulam Kochunniyude Makan (1976)
5. Ashwamedham film series (2 films)
  - Ashwamedham (1967)
  - Sarasayya (1971)
6. Chellamma film series (2 films)
  - Kallichellamma (1969)
  - Arikkari Ammu (1981)
7. C.I.D. Nazir film series (3 films)
  - C.I.D. Nazir (1971)
  - Taxi Car (1972)
  - Prethangalude Thazhvara (1973)
8. Lisa film series (2 films)
  - Lisa (1978)
  - Veendum Lisa (1987)
9. Tharadas & Balram film series (4 films)
  - Athirathram (1984)
  - Aavanazhi (1986)
  - Inspector Balram (1991)
  - Balram vs. Tharadas (2006) (Note: This film is also a spin-off to the 1984 film Athirathram.)
10. Ninnishtam Ennishtam film series (2 films)
  - Ninnishtam Ennishtam (1986)
  - Ninnishtam Ennishtam 2 (2011)
11. Dasan and Vijayan film series (3 films)
  - Nadodikkattu (1987)
  - Pattanapravesham (1988)
  - Akkare Akkare Akkare (1990)
12. Sagar Alias Jacky film series (2 films)
  - Irupatham Noottandu (1987)
  - Sagar Alias Jacky Reloaded (2009)
13. CBI film series (5 films)
  - Oru CBI Diary Kurippu (1988)
  - Jagratha: CBI Diary - Part 2 (1989)
  - Sethurama Iyer CBI (2004)
  - Nerariyan CBI (2005)
  - CBI 5: The Brain (2022)
14. August 1-film series (2 films)
  - August 1? (1988)
  - August 15 (2011)
15. Kireedam film series (2 films)
  - Kireedam (1989) (Note: A character mentioned as brother of Keerikaadan Jose appears in 1992 film Aadhaaram.)
  - Chenkol (1993)
16. Ramji Rao Speaking film series (3 films)
  - Ramji Rao Speaking (1989)
  - Mannar Mathai Speaking (1995)
  - Mannar Mathai Speaking 2 (2014)
17. Harihar Nagar film series (3 films)
  - In Harihar Nagar (1990)
  - 2 Harihar Nagar (2009)
  - In Ghost House Inn (2010)
18. Samrajyam film series (3 films)
  - Samrajyam (1990)
  - Samrajyam II: Son of Alexander (2015)
19. Kilukkam film series (2 films)
  - Kilukkam (1991)
  - Kilukkam Kilukilukkam (2006)
20. Khader Bhai film series (3 films)
  - Mimics Parade (1991)
  - Kasargod Khader Bhai (1992)
  - Again Kasargod Khader Bhai (2010)
21. Devasuram film series (2 films)
  - Devasuram (1993)
  - Raavanaprabhu (2001)
22. Dr. Sunny Joseph film series (2 films)
  - Manichitrathazhu (1993)
  - Geethaanjali (2013)
23. Uppukandam film series (2 films)
  - Uppukandam Brothers (1993) (Note: This film is a spin-off to the 1990 film Kottayam Kunjachan.)
  - Uppukandam Brothers Back in Action (2011)
24. Akashadoothu film-TV series (1 film, 1 series)
  - Akashadoothu (1993)
  - Akashadoothu (2011)
25. Mikhayel sons TV-film series (1 serial, 1 film)
  - Mikhayelinte Santhathikal [TV series] (1993)
  - Puthran (1994)
26. Commissioner and The King film series (4 films)
  - Commissioner (1994)
  - The King (1995)
  - Bharathchandran I.P.S (2005)
  - The King & the Commissioner (2012)
27. Azhagiya Ravanan-Ambujakshan film series (2 films)
  - Azhakiya Ravanan (1996)
  - Chirakodinja Kinavukal (2015)
28. Mandrake film series (2 films)
  - Junior Mandrake (1997)
  - Senior Mandrake (2010)
29. Kannur film series (2 films)
  - Kannur (1997)
  - Veendum Kannur (2012)
30. Aakasha Ganga film series (2 films)
  - Aakasha Ganga (1999)
  - Aakasha Ganga 2 (2019)
31. Saathan and Don film series (2 films)
  - Stop Violence (2002)
  - Asuravithu (2012)
32. Nandanam film-TV series (1 film, 1 series)
  - Nandanam (2002)
  - Nandanam (2020)
33. The People film series (3 films)
  - 4 the People (2004)
  - By the People (2005)
  - Of the People (2008)
34. Udayananu Tharam film series (2 films)
  - Udayananu Tharam (2005)
  - Padmasree Bharat Dr. Saroj Kumar (2012)
35. Lisamma film series (2 films)
  - Achanurangatha Veedu (2006)
  - Lisammayude Veedu (2013)
36. Major Mahadevan film series (4 films)
  - Keerthi Chakra (2006)
  - Kurukshetra (2008)
  - Kandahar (2010)
  - 1971: Beyond Borders (2017)
37. Raja film series (2 films)
  - Pokkiri Raja (2010)
  - Madhura Raja (2019)
38. Salt N' Pepper film series (2 films)
  - Salt N' Pepper (2011)
  - Black Coffee (2021)
39. Honey Bee film series (3 films)
  - Honey Bee (2013)
  - Honey Bee 2 (2017)
  - Honey Bee 2.5 (2017)
40. Punyalan film series (2 films)
  - Punyalan Agarbattis (2013)
  - Punyalan Private Limited (2017)
41. Drishyam film series (3 films)
  - Drishyam (2013)
  - Drishyam 2 (2021)
  - Drishyam 3 (2026)
42. Aadu film series (3 films)
  - Aadu (2015)
  - Aadu 2 (2017)
  - Aadu 3 (2026)
43. Pretham film series (2 films)
  - Pretham (2016)
  - Pretham 2 (2018)
44. Mikhael Extended Universe (3 films)
  - Mikhael (2019)
  - Marco (2024)
  - Kattalan (2026)
45. Lucifer Universe (2 films)
  - Lucifer (2019)
  - L2: Empuraan (2025)
46. Nna Thaan Case Kodu film series (2 films)
  - Nna Thaan Case Kodu (2022)
  - Sureshanteyum Sumalathayudeyum Hrudayahariyaya Pranayakadha (2024)
47. Vaazha film series (2 films)
  - Vaazha: Biopic of a Billion Boys (2024)
  - Vaazha II: Biopic of a Billion Bros (2026)
48. Gaganachari film series (2 films)
  - Gaganachari (2024)
  - Maniyan Chithappan (TBA)
49. Bharathanatyam film series (2 films)
  - Bharathanatyam (2024)
  - Bharathanatyam 2 Mohiniyattam (2026)
50. Rahul Sadasivan's Horror Cinematic Universe (3 films)
  - Bhoothakalam (2022)
  - Bramayugam (2024)
  - Diés Iraé (2025)

=== Common diegetic world ===
1. Animal Trilogy (2 films, 1 series)
  - Kishkindha Kaandam (2024)
  - Kerala Crime Files season 2 (2025)
  - Eko (2025)
2. Bachelor Party film series (2 films)
  - Bachelor Party (2012)
  - Bachelor Party D'eux (2026)
3. Chemmeen film series (3 films)
  - Chemmeen (1965)
  - Thirakalkkappuram (1998)
  - Uthara Chemmeen (2014)
4. Mimics film series (2 films)
  - Mimics Action 500 (1995)
  - Mimics Super 1000 (1996)
5. Bharya film series (2 films)
  - Veruthe Oru Bharya (2008)
  - Bharya Athra Pora (2013)
6. Husbands film series (2 films)
  - Happy Husbands (2010)
  - Husbands in Goa (2012)
7. Jayaraj's Navarasa series (8 films)
  - Shantham (2000)
  - Karunam (2000)
  - Bhibatsa (2002)
  - Adbutham (2005)
  - Veeram (2016)
  - Bhayanakam (2018)
  - Roudram 2018 (2019)
  - Hasyam (2020)
8. Weekend Cinematic Universe (2 films)
  - Minnal Murali (2021)
  - Detective Ujjwalan (2025)
9. Nayattu film series (2 films)
  - Nayattu (2021)
  - Ronth (2025)

== Marathi ==
=== Story-line / Character followup ===
1. Zapatlela film series (2 films)
  - Zapatlela (1993)
  - Zapatlela 2 (2013)
2. Aga Bai Arrecha film series (2 films)
  - Aga Bai Arrecha! (2004)
  - Aga Bai Arechyaa 2 (2015)
3. Navra Maza Navsacha film series (2 films)
  - Navra Maza Navsacha (2004)
  - Navra Maza Navsacha 2 (2024)
4. Sade Made Teen film series (2 films)
  - Saade Maade Teen (2007)
  - Punha Ekda Sade Made Teen (2026)
5. De Dhakka film series (2 films)
  - De Dhakka (2008)
  - De Dhakka 2 (2022)
6. Gallit Gondhal, Dillit Mujra film series (2 films)
  - Gallit Gondhal, Dillit Mujra (2009)
  - Punha Gondhal Punha Mujra (2014)
7. Mumbai-Pune-Mumbai film series (3 films)
  - Mumbai-Pune-Mumbai (2010)
  - Mumbai-Pune-Mumbai 2 (2015)
  - Mumbai Pune Mumbai 3 (2018)
8. Agadbam film series (2 films)
  - Agadbam (2010)
  - Maza Agadbam (2018)
9. Chintoo film series (2 films)
  - Chintoo (2012)
  - Chintoo 2 (2013)
10. Premachi Goshta series (2 films)
  - Premachi Goshta (2013)
  - Premachi Goshta 2 (2025)
11. Timepass film series (3 films)
  - Timepass (2014)
  - Timepass 2 (2015)
  - Timepass 3 (2022)
12. Dagadi Chawl film series (2 films)
  - Dagadi Chawl (2015)
  - Daagadi Chawl 2 (2022)
13. Deool Band film series (2 films)
  - Deool Band (2015)
  - Deool Band 2 (2026)
14. Boyz film series (4 films)
  - Boyz (2017)
  - Boyz 2 (2018)
  - Boyz 3 (2022)
  - Boyz 4 (2023)
15. Ye Re Ye Re Paisa film series (3 films)
  - Ye Re Ye Re Paisa (2018)
  - Ye Re Ye Re Paisa 2 (2019)
  - Ye Re Ye Re Paisa 3 (2025)
16. Shri Shivraj Ashtak (7 films)
  - Farzand (2018)
  - Fatteshikast (2019)
  - Pawankhind (2022)
  - Sher Shivraj (2022)
  - Subhedar (2023)
  - Shivrayancha Chhava (2024)
  - Ranapati Shivray: Swari Agra (2026)
17. Naal film series (2 films)
  - Naal (2018)
  - Naal 2 (2023)
18. Bhai film series (2 films)
  - Bhai: Vyakti Ki Valli (2019)
  - Bhai: Vyakti Ki Valli 2 (2019)
19. Takatak film series (2 films)
  - Takatak (2019)
  - Takatak 2 (2022)
20. Jhimma film series (2 films)
  - Jhimma (2021)
  - Jhimma 2 (2023)
21. Jayanti film series (2 films)
  - Jayanti (2021)
  - Jayanti 2 (2026)
22. Dharmaveer film series (2 films)
  - Dharmaveer (2022)
  - Dharmaveer 2 (2024)

== Odia ==
=== Story-line / Character followup ===
1. Something Something film series (2 films)
  - Something Something (2012)
  - Something Something 2 (2014)
2. Tu Mora Sathire film series (2 films)
  - Tu Mora Sathire (2020)
  - Tu Mora Sathire-2 (2021)

== Punjabi ==
=== Story-line / Character followup ===
1. Munde U.K. De film series (2 films)
  - Munde U.K. De (2009)
  - Aa Gaye Munde U.K. De (2014)
2. Yaar Annmulle film series (3 films)
  - Yaar Annmulle (2011)
  - Yaar Annmulle 2 (2017)
  - Yaar Anmulle Returns (2021)
3. Jatt & Juliet film series (3 films)
  - Jatt & Juliet (2012)
  - Jatt & Juliet 2 (2013)
  - Jatt & Juliet 3 (2024)
4. Carry On Jatta Trilogy (3 films)
  - Carry On Jatta (2012)
  - Carry On Jatta 2 (2018)
  - Carry on Jatta 3 (2023)
5. Sikander film series (2 films)
  - Sikander (2013)
  - Sikander 2 (2019)
6. Singh vs Kaur film series (2 films)
  - Singh vs Kaur (2013)
  - Singh vs Kaur 2 (2026)
7. Chaar Sahibzaade film series (2 films)
  - Chaar Sahibzaade (2014)
  - Chaar Sahibzaade: Rise of Banda Singh Bahadur (2016)
8. Mr & Mrs 420 film series (3 films)
  - Mr & Mrs 420 (2014)
  - Mr & Mrs 420 Returns (2018)
  - Mr & Mrs 420 Again (2025)
9. Rupinder Gandhi film series (2 films)
  - Rupinder Gandhi: The Gangster..? (2015)
  - Rupinder Gandhi 2: The Robinhood (2017)
10. Shareek film series (2 films)
  - Shareek (2015)
  - Shareek 2 (2022)
11. Ardaas film series (3 films)
  - Ardaas (2016)
  - Ardaas Karaan (2019)
  - Ardaas Sarbat De Bhalle Di (2024)
12. Nikka Zaildar Trilogy (3 films)
  - Nikka Zaildar (2016)
  - Nikka Zaildar 2 (2017)
  - Nikka Zaildar 3 (2019)
13. Jora film series (2 films)
  - Jora 10 Numbaria (2017)
  - Jora: The Second Chapter (2020)
14. Manje Bistre Trilogy (3 films)
  - Manje Bistre (2017)
  - Manje Bistre 2 (2019)
  - Manje Bistre 3 (2024)
15. Rabb Da Radio film series (2 films)
  - Rabb Da Radio (2017)
  - Rabb Da Radio 2 (2019)
  - Rabb Da Radio 3 (2026)
16. Dakuaan Da Munda film series (3 films)
  - Dakuaan Da Munda (2018)
  - Dakuaan Da Munda 2 (2022)
  - Dakuaan Da Munda 3 (2025)
17. Laung Laachi film series (2 films)
  - Laung Laachi (2018)
  - Laung Laachi 2 (2022)
18. Qismat film series (2 films)
  - Qismat (2018)
  - Qismat 2 (2021)
19. Raduaa film series (2 films)
  - Raduaa (2018)
  - Raduaa Returns (2024)
20. Chal Mera Putt Trilogy (4 films)
  - Chal Mera Putt (2019)
  - Chal Mera Putt 2 (2020)
  - Chal Mera Putt 3 (2021)
  - Chal Mera Putt 4 (2025)
21. Blackia film series (2 films)
  - Blackia (2019)
  - Blackia 2 (2023)
22. Warning film series (2 films)
  - Warning (2021)
  - Warning 2 (2024)

=== Common diegetic world ===
1. Yaraan Naal Baharaan film series (2 films)
  - Yaraan Naal Baharaan (2005)
  - Yaraan Naal Baharaan II (2012)
2. Punjab Trilogy (3 films)
  - Alms for a Blind Horse (2011)
  - The Fourth Direction (2015)
  - Crescent Night (2022)
3. Sardaar Ji film series (3 films)
  - Sardaar Ji (2015)
  - Sardaar Ji 2 (2016)
  - Sardaar Ji 3 (2025)

== Tamil ==
=== Story-line / Character followup ===
1. Iruvar Ullam film series (2 films)
  - Iruvar Ullam (1963)
  - Once More (1997)
2. Kalyanaraman film series (2 films)
  - Kalyanaraman (1979)
  - Japanil Kalyanaraman (1985)
3. Manal Kayiru film series (2 films)
  - Manal Kayiru (1982)
  - Manal Kayiru 2 (2016)
4. Krodham film series (2 films)
  - Krodham (1989)
  - Krodham 2 (2000)
5. Amaidhi Padai film series (2 films)
  - Amaidhi Padai (1994)
  - Nagaraja Cholan MA, MLA (2013)
6. Indian film series (2 films)
  - Indian (1996)
  - Indian 2 (2024)
  - Indian 3 (TBA)
7. Saamy film series (2 films)
  - Saamy (2003)
  - Saamy Square (2018)
8. Sandakozhi film series (2 films)
  - Sandakozhi (2005)
  - Sandakozhi 2 (2018)
9. Chithiram Pesuthadi film series (2 films)
  - Chithiram Pesuthadi (2006)
  - Chithiram Pesuthadi 2 (2019)
10. Thalai Nagaram film series (3 films)
  - Thalai Nagaram (2006)
  - Naai Sekar Returns (2022)
  - Thalai Nagaram 2 (2023)
11. Billa film series (2 films)
  - Billa (2007) (Note: It is the remake of Billa (1980), which itself is the remake of the 1978 Hindi film Don.)
  - Billa II (2012)
12. Chennai 600028 film series (2 films)
  - Chennai 600028 (2007)
  - Chennai 600028 II: Second Innings (2016)
13. Sivi film series (2 films)
  - Sivi (2007)
  - Sivi 2 (2022)
14. Vennila Kabadi Kuzhu film series (2 films)
  - Vennila Kabadi Kuzhu (2009)
  - Vennila Kabaddi Kuzhu 2 (2019)
15. Singam film series (3 films)
  - Singam (2010)
  - Singam II (2013)
  - Si3 (2017)
16. Enthiran film series (2 films)
  - Enthiran (2010)
  - 2.0 (2018)
17. Tamizh Padam film series (2 films)
  - Tamizh Padam (2010)
  - Tamizh Padam 2 (2018)
18. Thani Oruvan film series (2 films)
  - Thani Oruvan (2015)
  - Thani Oruvan 2 (TBA)
19. Kalavani film series (2 films)
  - Kalavani (2010)
  - Kalavani 2 (2019)
20. Kazhugu film series (2 films)
  - Kazhugu (2012)
  - Kazhugu 2 (2019)
21. Vishwaroopam film series (2 films)
  - Vishwaroopam (2013)
  - Vishwaroopam II (2018)
22. Chennaiyil Oru Naal film series (2 films)
  - Chennaiyil Oru Naal (2013)
  - Chennaiyil Oru Naal 2 (2017)
23. Velaiilla Pattadhari film series (2 films)
  - Velaiilla Pattadhari (2014)
  - Velaiilla Pattadhari 2 (2017)
24. Baahubali film series (2 films) (Note: The first film was a Telugu–Tamil bilingual while the second film was made in Telugu and only partially reshot in Tamil.)
  - Baahubali: The Beginning (2015)
  - Baahubali 2: The Conclusion (2017)
25. Demonte Colony film series (3 films)
  - Demonte Colony (2015)
  - Demonte Colony 2 (2024)
  - Demonte Colony 3 (2026)
26. Maari film series (2 films)
  - Maari (2015)
  - Maari 2 (2018)
27. Devi film series (2 films) (Note: Shot simultaneously in Telugu and Tamil languages.)
  - Devi (2016)
  - Devi 2 (2019)
28. Pichaikkaran film series (2 films)
  - Pichaikkaran (2016)
  - Pichaikkaran 2 (2023)
29. Lokesh Cinematic Universe (8 films)
  - Kaithi (2019)
  - Vikram (2022)
  - Leo (2023)
  - Benz (TBA)
  - Kaithi 2 (TBA)
  - Leo 2 (TBA)
  - Vikram 2 (TBA)
  - Rolex spin-off (TBA)
30. Jiivi film series (2 films)
  - Jiivi (2019)
  - Jiivi 2 (2022)
31. Kaalidas film series (2 films)
  - Kaalidas (2019)
  - Kaalidas 2 (2026)
32. Draupathi film series
  - Draupathi (2020)
  - Draupathi 2 (2026)
33. Methagu film series
  - Methagu (2021)
  - Methagu 2 (2022)
34. Sarpatta Parambarai film series (2 films)
  - Sarpatta Parambarai (2021)
  - Sarpatta Parambarai: Round 2 (TBA)
35. Gatta Kusthi film series (2 films)
  - Gatta Kusthi (2022)
  - Gatta Kusthi 2 (2026)
36. Ponniyin Selvan film series (2 films)
  - Ponniyin Selvan: I (2022)
  - Ponniyin Selvan: II (2023)
37. Jailer film series (2 films)
  - Jailer (2023)
  - Jailer 2 (2026)
38. Viduthalai film series (2 films)
  - Viduthalai Part 1 (2023)
  - Viduthalai Part 2 (2024)

=== Common diegetic world ===
1. Aval Appadithan film series (2 films)
  - Aval Appadithan (1978)
  - Aval Appadithan 2 (2023)
2. Neeya film series (3 films)
  - Neeya? (1979)
  - Naane Varuven (1992)
  - Neeya 2 (2019)
3. Azhiyatha Kolangal film series (2 films)
  - Azhiyatha Kolangal (1979)
  - Azhiyatha Kolangal 2 (2019)
4. Aan Paavam film series (2 films)
  - Aan Paavam (1985)
  - Kai Vandha Kalai (2006)
5. Manithan film series (2 films)
  - Nalaya Manithan (1989)
  - Adhisaya Manithan (1990)
6. Pulan Visaranai film series (2 films)
  - Pulan Visaranai (1990)
  - Pulan Visaranai 2 (2015)
7. Jai Hind film series (Note: The first film was shot in Tamil while the second film was shot simultaneously in Tamil, Telugu and Kannada languages.) (2 films)
  - Jai Hind (1994)
  - Jai Hind 2 (2014)
8. Charlie Chaplin film series (2 films)
  - Charlie Chaplin (2002)
  - Charlie Chaplin 2 (2019)
9. Chandramukhi film series (2 films)
  - Chandramukhi (2005) (Note: The film is a remake of the 1993 Malayalam film Manichitrathazhu.)
  - Chandramukhi 2 (2023)
10. Jithan film series (2 films)
  - Jithan (2005) (Note: The film was simultaneously shot with the 2004 Hindi film Gayab.)
  - Jithan 2 (2016)
11. Thiruttu Payale film series (2 films)
  - Thiruttu Payale (2006)
  - Thiruttu Payale 2 (2017)
12. Naan Avanillai film series (2 films)
  - Naan Avanillai (2007) (Note: It is the remake of Naan Avanillai (1974).)
  - Naan Avanillai 2 (2009)
13. Muni film series (4 films)
  - Muni (2007)
  - Muni 2: Kanchana (2011)
  - Muni 3: Kanchana 2 (2015)
  - Muni 4: Kanchana 3 (2019)
  - Muni 5: Kanchana 4 (2026)
14. Pasanga film series (2 films)
  - Pasanga (2009)
  - Pasanga 2 (2015)
15. Naadodigal film series (3 films)
  - Naadodigal (2009)
  - Vetrivel (2016)
  - Naadodigal 2 (2020)
16. Ko film series (2 films)
  - Ko (2011)
  - Ko 2 (2016)
17. Kalakalappu film series (2 films)
  - Kalakalappu (2012)
  - Kalakalappu 2 (2018)
18. Naan franchise (3 films)
  - Naan (2012)
  - Salim (2014)
  - Mazhai Pidikkatha Manithan (2024)
19. Saattai franchise (3 films)
  - Saattai (2012)
  - Appa (2016)
  - Adutha Saattai (2019)
20. Pizza film series (4 films)
  - Pizza (2012)
  - Pizza 2: The Villa (2013)
  - Pizza 3: The Mummy (2023)
  - Pizza 4: Home Alone (TBA)
21. Kumki film series (2 films)
  - Kumki (2012)
  - Kumki 2 (2025)
22. Soodhu Kavvum film series (2 films)
  - Soodhu Kavvum (2013)
  - Soodhu Kavvum 2 (2024)
23. Aranmanai film series (4 films)
  - Aranmanai (2014)
  - Aranmanai 2 (2016)
  - Aranmanai 3 (2021)
  - Aranmanai 4 (2024)
24. Darling film series (2 films)
  - Darling (2015)
  - Darling 2 (2016)
25. Goli Soda film series (2 films)
  - Goli Soda (2015)
  - Goli Soda 2 (2018)
26. Dhilluku Dhuddu film series (4 films)
  - Dhilluku Dhuddu (2016)
  - Dhilluku Dhuddu 2 (2019)
  - DD Returns (2023)
  - DD Next Level (2025)
27. Jigarthanda film series (2 films)
  - Jigarthanda (2014)
  - Jigarthanda DoubleX (2023)
28. Uriyadi film series (2 films)
  - Uriyadi (2016)
  - Uriyadi 2 (2019)
29. Kuththu film series (2 films)
  - Iruttu Araiyil Murattu Kuththu (2018)
  - Irandam Kuththu (2020)
30. Hot Spot film series (2 films)
  - Hot Spot (2024)
  - Hot Spot 2 Much (2026)
31. Meesaya Murukku film series (2 films)
  - Meesaya Murukku (2017)
  - Meesaya Murukku 2 (2026)
32. Mookuthi Amman film series (2 films)
  - Mookuthi Amman (2020)
  - Mookuthi Amman 2 (2026)

== Telugu ==
=== Story-line / Character followup ===
1. Money film series (3 films)
  - Money (1993)
  - Money Money (1995)
  - Money Money, More Money (2011)
2. Yamaleela film series (2 films)
  - Yamaleela (1994)
  - Yamaleela 2 (2014)
3. Manmadhudu film series (2 films)
  - Manmadhudu (2002)
  - Manmadhudu 2 (2019)
4. Arya film series (2 films)
  - Arya (2004)
  - Arya 2 (2009)
5. Shankar Dada film series (2 films) (Note: The film series is a remake of Bollywood's Munna Bhai film series.)
  - Shankar Dada M.B.B.S. (2004)
  - Shankar Dada Zindabad (2007)
6. Chandramukhi film series (2 films) (Note: First film is shot in Tamil while the second film is shot in Telugu language.)
  - Chandramukhi (2005) (Note: It is a remake of the Malayalam film Manichitrathazhu)
  - Nagavalli (2010) (Note: A Telugu film made as a sequel to the Tamil film Chandramukhi. The name is derived from the main character of Manichitrathazhu.)
7. Kick film series (2 films)
  - Kick (2009)
  - Kick 2 (2015)
8. Rakta Charitra film series (2 films)
  - Rakta Charitra I (2010)
  - Rakta Charitra II (2010)
9. Gabbar Singh film series (2 films)
  - Gabbar Singh (2012)
  - Sardaar Gabbar Singh (2016)
10. Avunu film series (2 films)
  - Avunu (2012)
  - Avunu 2 (2015)
11. Drushyam film series (2 films)
  - Drushyam (2014) (Note: It is a remake of the Malayalam film Drishyam)
  - Drushyam 2 (2021) (Note: It is a remake of the Malayalam film Drishyam 2)
12. Karthikeya film series (3 films)
  - Karthikeya (2014)
  - Karthikeya 2 (2022)
  - Karthikeya 3 (TBA)
13. Baahubali film series (4 films)
  - Baahubali: The Beginning (2015)
  - Baahubali 2: The Conclusion (2017)
  - Baahubali: The Epic (2025)
  - Baahubali: The Eternal War – Part 1 (2027)
14. Bangarraju film series (2 films)
  - Soggade Chinni Nayana (2016)
  - Bangarraju (2022)
15. Abhinetri film series (2 films)
  - Abhinetri (2016)
  - Abhinetri 2 (2019)
16. Goodachari film series (2 films)
  - Goodachari (2018)
  - Goodachari 2 (2026)
17. NTR film series (2 films)
  - N.T.R: Kathanayakudu (2019)
  - N.T.R: Mahanayakudu (2019)
18. Fun and Frustration Series (3 films)
  - F2: Fun and Frustration (2019)
  - F3: Fun and Frustration (2022)
  - F4 (TBA)
19. iSmart film series (2 films)
  - iSmart Shankar (2019)
  - Double iSmart (2024)
20. Yatra film series (2 films)
  - Yatra (2019)
  - Yatra 2 (2024)
21. Mathu Vadalara film series (2 films)
  - Mathu Vadalara (2019)
  - Mathu Vadalara 2 (2024)
22. HIT Universe (4 films)
  - HIT: The First Case (2020)
  - HIT: The Second Case (2022)
  - HIT: The Third Case (2025)
  - HIT: The Fourth Case (TBA)
23. Nirbhandam film series (2 films)
  - Nirbhandam (2020)
  - Nirbhandam 2 (2021)
24. Pushpa film series (3 films)
  - Pushpa: The Rise – Part 1 (2021)
  - Pushpa: The Rule – Part 2 (2024)
  - Pushpa: The Rampage – Part 3 (2028)
25. Maa Oori Polimera film series (3 films)
  - Maa Oori Polimera (2021)
  - Maa Oori Polimera 2 (2023)
  - Maa Oori Polimera 3 (TBA)
26. Akhanda film series (2 films)
  - Akhanda (2021)
  - Akhanda 2: Thaandavam (2025)
27. Bhamakalapam film series (2 films)
  - Bhamakalapam (2022)
  - Bhamakalapam 2 (2024)
28. Odela film series (2 films)
  - Odela Railway Station (2022)
  - Odela 2 (2025)
29. Tillu film series (3 films)
  - DJ Tillu (2022)
  - Tillu Square (2024)
  - Tillu Cube (TBA)
30. Salaar film series (2 films)
  - Salaar: Part 1 – Ceasefire (2023)
  - Salaar: Part 2 - Shouryaanga Parvam (TBA)
31. Mad film series (3 films)
  - Mad (2023)
  - Mad Square (2025)
  - Mad Cube (TBA)
32. Devara film series (2 films)
  - Devara: Part 1 (2024)
  - Devara: Part 2 (TBA)
33. Sujeeth Cinematic Universe (4 films)
  - Saaho (2019)
  - They Call Him OG (2025)
  - Bloody Romeo (TBA)
  - They Call Him OG 2 (TBA)

=== Common Diegetic World ===
1. Khaidi film series (3 films)
  - Khaidi (1983)
  - Khaidi No. 786 (1988)
  - Khaidi No. 150 (2017) (Note: It is the remake of the Tamil film Kaththi.)
2. Allari Mogudu film series (2 films)
  - Allari Mogudu (1992)
  - Mama Manchu Alludu Kanchu (2015) (Note: It is the remake of the Marathi film Be Dune Saade Chaar (2009).)
3. Gaayam film series (2 films)
  - Gaayam (1993)
  - Gaayam 2 (2010)
4. Pelli Sandadi film series (2 films)
  - Pelli Sandadi (1996)
  - Pelli SandaD (2021)
5. Satya film series (2 films) (Note: First film was shot in Hindi while the second film was shot in Telugu and Hindi.)
  - Satya (1998)
  - Satya 2 (2013)
6. Aithe film series (2 films) (Note: Both film were shot in Telugu and Hindi.)
  - Aithe (2003)
  - Aithe 2.0 (2018)
7. Aravind film series (2 films)
  - A Film by Aravind (2005)
  - Aravind 2 (2013)
8. Vennela film series (2 films)
  - Vennela (2005)
  - Vennela 1½ (2012)
9. Mantra film series (2 films)
  - Mantra (2007)
  - Mantra 2 (2015)
10. Operation Duryodhana film series (2 films)
  - Operation Duryodhana (2007)
  - Operation Duryodhana 2 (2013)
11. Broker film series (2 films)
  - Broker (2010)
  - Broker 2 (2014)
12. Dandupalya franchise (2 films) (Note: First film was shot in Kannada while the second film was shot in Telugu.)
  - Dandupalya (2012)
  - Thaggedele (2022)
13. Vinayakudu film series (2 films)
  - Vinayakudu (2008)
  - Villagelo Vinayakudu (2009)
14. Prema Katha Chitram film series (2 films)
  - Prema Katha Chitram (2013)
  - Prema Katha Chitram 2 (2019)
15. Prathinidhi film series (2 films)
  - Prathinidhi (2014)
  - Prathinidhi 2 (2024)
16. Ice Cream film series (2 films)
  - Ice Cream (2014)
  - Ice Cream 2 (2014)
17. Vyjayanthi film series (2 films)
  - Karthavyam (1990)
  - Arjun Son of Vyjayanthi (2025)
18. Raju Gari Gadhi film series (4 films)
  - Raju Gari Gadhi (2015)
  - Raju Gari Gadhi 2 (2017) (Note: The film is a remake of the 2016 Malayalam film Pretham.)
  - Raju Gari Gadhi 3 (2019) (Note: The film is a remake of the 2019 Tamil film Dhilluku Dhuddu 2.)
  - Raju Gari Gadhi 4 (TBA)

== Multi-lingual ==
=== Story-line / Character followup ===
This is a list of film series in which both films were not released in a common language including dubs.

1. Salem Vishnu film series (2 films)
  - New Delhi (1987; Malayalam)
  - Salem Vishnu (1990; Tamil) (Note: A prequel to the film New Delhi)
