= Local Kung Fu (film series) =

Assamese film series

- Created by: Kenny Deori Basumatary
- Original work: Local Kung Fu (2013)
- Owner: Kenny Deori Basumatary
- Years: 2013–2024

Films and television
- Film(s): Local Kung Fu; Local Kung Fu 2; Local Kung Fu 3

The Local Kung Fu film series consists of Assamese Kung fu martial arts-comedy film. Created by Kenny Deori Basumatary. The films revolve around the locality of Guwahati city, and Kung fu art. The story is pushed forward by a gang of thugs, their misadventures, unenthusiastic, messy, and problematic handling of their illicit activities.

The first movie was an independent film shot on Handycam. It grossed over 18 times its production budget. Subsequent installments received mixed responses, usually dwarfed by simultaneous releases with pan India big budget films.

== Films ==
| Film | Release date | Director | Screenwriter | Story by | Producers | Notes |
|---|---|---|---|---|---|---|
| Local Kung Fu | 27 September 2013 | Kenny Basumatary | Kenny Basumatary | Kenny Basumatary | Kenny Basumatary | |
| Local Kung Fu 2 | 19 April 2017 | Kenny Basumatary | Kenny Basumatary | Kenny Basumatary | Durlov Baruah | |
| Local Kung Fu 3 | 5 September 2024 | Kenny Basumatary | Kenny Basumatary | Kenny Basumatary | Durlov Baruah | |

=== Local Kung Fu ===
Charlie, an amateur kung fu enthusiast, stands up against a local thug, who wants to coerce his girlfriends uncle to set up an illicit business.

=== Local Kung Fu 2 ===
A spiritual sequel to Local Kung Fu (2013), about two pairs of twins. One of the pairs are crooks and know Kung fu, while the other pair are businessmen who do not know Kung fu.

=== Local Kung Fu 3 ===
A direct sequel to Local Kung Fu, the thug tries to mend their way after their illegal activities led to destroying their childhood teacher dream.

== Development ==
The first movie was an independent film, produced with investment from Basumatary mother of 1,00,000 INR, of which 43,000 INR were spent on a camera. Basumatary cast many of his relatives and friends into the movie to keep production expenditure low, and within budget. Durlov Baruah stepped in and made an investment of 7,00,000 for promotion of the film. The film earned roughly 18,00,000 INR at the end of its theatrical run.

The second film was made for approximately 30,00,000 INR, with investment from multiple sources:

- 7,00,000 INR from Hero MotoCorp and Vivo
- 8-10,00,000 INR from Basumatary and parents

For the third installment, Basumatary hired 38 fighters and choreographed one climax fight scene with 29 actors on one 'long take'.

== Release ==
Local Kung Fu was released in theatres but was ousted by the release of Besharam. Similarly, its sequel was ousted by Bahubali 2. Both of the films were pan India releases.
