= Local Kung Fu =

- Directed by: Kenny Basumatary
- Written by: Kenny Basumatary
- Produced by: Durlov Baruah
- Starring: Kenny Basumatary; Sangeeta Nair; Utkal Hazowary; Kabindra Das
- Music by: Tony; Nabarun Paul; Utkarsh Dhotekar; Diganta Gogoi
- Production company: Kenny Studios
- Distributed by: KK Films
- Release date: 27 September 2013
- Running time: 83 Minutes
- Country: India
- Language: Assamese
- Budget: INR 95,000 (~USD 1,600)
- Box office: INR 18,00,000 (~USD 31,000)

Local Kung Fu is an indie Assamese kung fu martial arts-comedy film directed by Kenny Basumatary and the second Assamese film to have a nationwide release. It has also been dubbed as India’s first kung fu film. The film is the first installment in the Local Kung Fu film series and was produced by Durlov Baruah. A spiritual sequel, Local Kung Fu 2, was released on 19 April 2017. A third and direct sequel, Local Kung Fu 3, was released on 5 September 2024. The plot revolves around Charlie, "an ordinary boy from Guwahati with a delicate stomach"; his girlfriend; and a number of madcap characters.

== Plot ==
Charlie lives with his uncle, a kung fu tutor, and his cousin, Johnny, in Guwahati. He recently shifted from Tezpur, due to his girlfriend, Sumi, being sent away to Guwahati in an attempt by her family to keep them apart. Sumi is now living with her uncle, aunt and their daughter.

Charlie arrives at Sumi's house and introduces himself as 'Montu' (a potential future husband of Sumi, whom Sumi had chased away earlier) to her uncle, Bhobananda Das. A local gang, headed by Dulu, a kung fu enthusiast, intends to open a Liquor shop, but Bhobananda Das, an Excise Inspector, declines to give them the required license, due to the location being in front of a pre-school institute. The gang tries to bribe him, which Das refuses. The gang tries to cough up information from rival gang on how to bring Das around, but it turns out that Das had declined their bribes as well, and they say that Das is incorruptible and stubborn. The gang resorts to threatening his family. When they threaten Sumi, Charlie intervenes. In retaliation, Dulu and his gang beat up Charlie.

On the other hand, Johnny is being pressured by his two friends, Bonzo and KK, into consuming alcohol and tobacco. Charlie learns of Johnny's intoxication and decides to inform and complain to Bonzo and KK's parents. In a twist, Bonzo and KK have no parents, and their brother/foster parent turns out to be Dulu. Dulu is amused at finding Charlie at his house, whom he had encountered before in a fight. Nonetheless, he allows Charlie to explain the purpose of his visit. Dulu punishes his brothers. Charlie inadvertently bumps into Bhobananda Das and the real Montu simultaneously. Bhobananda learns the truth about Charlie masquerading as Montu and reprimands both Charlie and Montu. Later, Charlie make amends with Sumi's uncle.

Bonzo and KK seek vengeance on Charlie, but they, themselves, are thrashed. In return, Dulu challenges Charlie to a fight. Charlie sets the term that if he wins, Dulu and his gang will stop interfering in his and Sumi's families. Dulu agrees and states that if Charlie loses, he will leave Guwahati forever. In preparation for the fight, Charlie begins to learn and improve his Wing Chun and taekwondo under the tutelage of his uncle. In the final showdown, Charlie arrives to fight one on one with Dulu. After a long and toilsome fight, Charlie manages to defeat Dulu, thus ending their feud.

== Cast ==
- Kenny Basumatary as Charlie
- Sangeeta Nair as Sumi Das
- Utkal Hazowary as Dulu
- Kabindra Dass as Bhobananda Das
- Bonny Deori as Bonzo
- Johnny Deori as Johnny
- Ronnie Deori as KK
- Bibhash Singha as Tansen
- Amar Singha Deori as Charlie's Uncle
- Manab Saikia as Koku
- Tony Deori Basumatary as Montu

== Reception ==
The movie grossed approximately 19 times its production budget.

=== Accolades ===
Local Kung Fu was nominated for best Assamese film in the inaugural Filmfare awards for the Eastern region. Kenny Basumatary was nominated for best director.

== Sequel ==
A spiritual sequel, Local Kung Fu 2 was released on 19 April 2017. Local Kung Fu 3, the film's direct sequel, was released on 5 September 2024.
