= Kadamai Kanniyam Kattupaadu =

1987 film by Santhana Bharathi

- Theatrical release poster
- Directed by: Santhana Bharathi
- Screenplay by: Ananthu; Santhana Bharathi
- Story by: T. Damodaran
- Produced by: Kamal Haasan; Chandrahasan
- Starring: Sathyaraj; Geetha
- Cinematography: Suresh Kumar A.
- Edited by: B. Lenin; V. T. Vijayan
- Music by: Ilaiyaraaja
- Production company: Raaj Kamal Films International
- Release date: 12 June 1987
- Country: India
- Language: Tamil

Kadamai Kanniyam Kattupaadu (transl. Duty, Dignity and Discipline) is a 1987 Indian Tamil-language crime thriller film directed by Santhana Bharathi and produced by Kamal Haasan, starring Sathyaraj, Geetha and Captain Raju. The film had no songs, though the score was composed by Ilaiyaraaja. It is a remake of 1986 Malayalam film Aavanazhi. The film was released on 12 June 1987.

== Plot ==
The film revolves around the story of an honest and straightforward Tamil Nadu Police officer and his life.

== Cast ==
- Sathyaraj as SI Balaram
- Geetha
- Jeevitha
- Captain Raju
- Nassar as Reporter
- Delhi Ganesh
- Kamala Kamesh
- Nalini
- V. K. Ramasamy
- Malaysia Vasudevan
- Major Sundararajan
- G. M. Sundar
- S Sathyendra
- T. K. S. Natarajan
- Sivachandran
- Kamal Haasan as himself (guest appearance)
- S. Sathyendra as thief (uncredited)

== Production ==
Kadamai Kanniyam Kattupaadu is a remake of the 1986 Malayalam film Aavanazhi. Kamal Haasan produced the film, and although an established actor, did not star. Haasan initially planned to remake the Malayalam film Boeing Boeing (1985) in Tamil; however he dropped the plan and instead choose to remake Aavanazhi. Sathyaraj said he accepted to act in the film because it was a remake of a successful film, and was guaranteed to do well.

== Release and reception ==
Kadamai Kanniyam Kattupadu was released on 12 June 1987. Jayamanmadhan of Kalki said Sathyaraj was ruling every frame of the film.

== See also ==
- List of Indian films without songs
