= Aavanazhi =

1986 Indian Malayalam-language action film

- Theatrical release poster
- Directed by: I. V. Sasi
- Written by: T. Damodaran
- Produced by: Sajan
- Starring: Mammootty; Geetha; Sukumaran; Janardhanan; Seema; Nalini
- Cinematography: Jayaram V.
- Edited by: K. Narayanan
- Music by: Shyam
- Production company: Saj Productions
- Release date: 12 September 1986
- Running time: 152 minutes
- Country: India
- Language: Malayalam

Aavanazhi is a 1986 Indian Malayalam-language action film directed by I. V. Sasi, written by T. Damodaran. The film deals with social and political issues of that time. It stars Mammootty, Geetha, Seema, Sukumaran, Captain Raju, Janardanan, Jagannatha Varma, Innocent, Thikkurisi Sukumaran Nair, Sreenivasan and Sankaradi.

Aavanazhi was the highest grossing Malayalam film at the time and was an industry hit. It was remade in Kannada as Anthima Theerpu, in Tamil as Kadamai Kanniyam Kattupaadu, in Telugu as Marana Sasanam and in Hindi as Satyamev Jayate. I. V. Sasi made two sequels — Inspector Balram in 1991 and Balram vs. Taradas in 2006.

== Plot ==
Satyaraj, an infamous professional killer, assassinates a cement contractor as per the orders of his business rival, Vincent. Balram, called as "Karadi Balu" is an honest but reputed notorious and arrogant police officer, apprehends Satyaraj within a day. But before interrogating Satyaraj, he was taken charge by another investigating officer. Vincent with the help of Adv. Jayachandran, influences witnesses and the investigating officer of the case and tampers with evidence. As a result, Satyaraj is acquitted of the offence. But since he has several cases against him, he is not released from custody pending trial in those cases. Balram was earlier tried for custodial death of a teenage boy arrested by him. Labelled as a murderer, his lover's father objects to his relationship with his daughter. Heartbroken, he resorts to drinking and womanizing. Satyaraj escapes from jail with the help of Jail superintendent. Radha, sister of the teenage boy who is alleged to be killed by Balram, seeking justice against Balram, is conducting a case against Balram and other police officers through Adv. Jayachandran. Adv. Jayachandran makes Radha believe that Satyaraj has certain documents implicating Balram in the death of her brother. Radha believes Adv. Jayachandran and agrees to provide safe shelter to Satyaraj. Balram upon realising that the prostitute with whom he had affairs, is carrying his child, offers to marry her. During vehicle search, Balram recovers certain incriminating documents and submits the same to his superior officer. But his superior is corrupted and is a partner of Vincent and returns those documents back to him. But Balram had already sent a copy of those documents to Central Bureau of Investigation, who arrests the superior officer, Vincent and Adv Jayachandran. Radha came to know from Vincent's son that her brother was killed by Satyaraj at the orders of Vincent and to avoid suspicion, the superior officer framed Balram as an accused in the case. Realising the truth, Radha informs Satyaraj's whereabouts to Balram, Who plans an operation to arrest Satyaraj. Satyaraj, realising Balram's plan, takes Radha and her friend as hostage and tries to escape. Balram gave chase and after a scuffle, kills Satyaraj. Balram is arrested by fellow officers.

== Cast ==
- Mammootty as CI Balram
- Geetha as Seetha
- Seema as Radha
- Nalini as Usha Jayachandran
- Sukumaran as Adv.Jayachandran
- Captain Raju as Sathyaraj
- Janardanan as Vincent
- Innocent as Vishnu
- Sreenivasan as Sreeni
- C. I. Paul as Chandrahasan
- Paravoor Bharathan as Chackochan
- Kundara Johny as CI Alex George
- K. P. A. C. Azeez as Commissioner Azeez
- Sankaradi as Viswanathan
- Jagannatha Varma as DIG Kumar
- Augustine as SI Ummer
- Kunchan as Constable "Samshayam" Vasu
- Shafeeq as Benny Vincent
- Thikkurisi Sukumaran Nair as Nampoothiri
- Kumari Shibi as Jyothi
- Santhakumari as Radha's Mother
- Prathapachandran
- Hari as Advocate
- Rajan Padoor as Kallan Kuttan
- Amit Amee as Unni/Radha's younger Brother
- Thiruthiyadu Vilasini as Chackochan's wife
- Sajith Devadas as Nirmal Hasan
- Gorilla Unni as Circle Inspector
- Krishnakkurupp NB
- Aliyar

== Release and reception ==
The film was released on 12 September 1986, in 20 theatres. In 2005, Nana Magazine wrote that Mammootty has played cop in a total of 25 films from Yavanika to Balram vs Tharadas, but his most memorable police role is that of Inspector Balram from I. V. Sasi's Avanazhi. The film was a major commercial success. The film ran for more than 100 days in theatres in Kerala.

== Remakes ==
All the remakes of the film were commercial successes.

Year	Film	Language	Ref.
1987	Marana Sasanam	Telugu	
1987	Anthima Theerpu	Kannada	
1987	Kadamai Kanniyam Kattupaadu	Tamil	
1987	Satyamev Jayate	Hindi	

== Sequels ==
The movie had two sequels; a 1991 film Inspector Balram and a spiritual successor, Balram vs. Tharadas in which Mammootty reprises his roles from two films, Inspector Balram from Aavanazhi and Tharadas from Athiratram.

== Legacy ==
The film is considered to be one of I.V. Sasi's best works. The film remains to be the only Malayalam Industry hit with a policeman as its central character. The protagonist Inspector Balram remains to be one of the most iconic characters in Malayalam cinema.
