= Bornodi Bhotiai =

Film by Anupam Kaushik Bohra

- Directed by: Anupam Kaushik Bohra
- Written by: Anupam Kaushik Bohra
- Produced by: Anupam Kaushik Bohra
- Starring: Dorothy Bharadwaj
- Cinematography: Prayash Sharma Tamuly
- Edited by: Rantu Chetia
- Music by: Tarali Sharma
- Production company: Bhawariya T-Positive Production
- Release dates: 28 October 2018 (Mumbai); 3 May 2019 (India)

Bornodi Bhotiai (Note: Also known as Bornodi Bhotiai: Love by the River) (Assamese pronunciation: [bɔɹnɔ.di bʱɔtijɔai]; transl. They are flooded by the Brahmaputra) is a 2018 Indian Assamese-language drama film, written, directed and produced by Anupam Kaushik Bora under the banner of Bhawaria Tea Positive Productions. The film stars Dorothy Bharadwaj.

== Cast ==
- Dorothy Bharadwaj as Moukan
- Anupam Kaushik Bohra as Luit
- Diganta Konwar as Bihuwa
- Dulal Nath as Dino
- Kenny Basumatary

== Release ==
The film premiered at the 2018 MAMI Mumbai Film Festival on 28 October 2018. It was released theatrically in India on 3 May 2019.

== Reception ==
Sharanya Gopinathan of The News Minute called the film "elegant" and "soul-quenching." She further wrote, "When dealing with a movie as subtle and saturated with beauty as Bornodi Bhoiai, there isn’t really a clear way to trace a specific or linear plot. Thanks to the beauty of its elements, themes and cinematography, you could easily forget that it has or needs a plot at all, and you’d be happy to see it carry on for a couple of hours longer just for the satisfaction it provides the soul."
