= Local Utpaat =

- Poster
- Directed by: Kenny Deori Basumatary
- Written by: Kenny Deori Basumatary
- Produced by: Kenny Deori Basumatary, Anupam Baishya.
- Starring: Kenny Deori Basumatary; Poonam Gurung
- Music by: Tonay Borah; Jyoti Chetia
- Production company: Kenny DB Films
- Release date: 13 May 2022
- Running time: 115 minutes
- Country: India
- Language: Assamese
- Budget: INR 30 Lakhs (USD ~37,000)
- Box office: INR 1.1 Crore (USD ~124,000)

Local Utpaat is an Indian Assamese-language kung fu comedy film directed by Kenny Deori Basumatary.

== Plot ==
Amit and Maya have been in a relationship for three years. Amit, struggling to find work, is living with his friends, Johnny and Montu, in a rented house in Guwahati. Meanwhile, Maya’s ex-boyfriend, Donnie, still harbouring feelings for her, seeks the help of a relationship consultant known as “BUG Da” to separate the couple. Maya’s elder sister, Moni, is pressuring her to introduce her boyfriend’s family at a family gathering. Amit’s elder brother, Robin, arrives at Amit’s home but suffers a mild concussion, resulting in short-term memory loss. This leads to repeated introductions and bonding sessions between Robin and Maya over their shared interest in martial arts. Amit reveals to Robin that Maya’s father expects him to secure a stable job.

During a family meeting arranged by Maya’s father, Amit and Robin face awkward interactions. Determined to find employment, Amit and his friends makes persistent efforts, however BUG Da, who has been secretly monitoring their activities, sabotages their attempts. Maya and Amit decide to get married secretly in court. When Donnie learns of their plans, he plan to resorts to violence and hires thugs to disrupt their union. Maya, suspecting surveillance, devises a trap involving a significant amount of cash. However, BUG Da drugs their food, rendering Amit and his friends incapacitated. Donnie and his thugs beat them up, while Bug Da strip Montu for "Money". Maya arrive and join the fight, but when the thugs attack Maya, Donnie has a change of heart. Maya’s father intervenes, chasing away the thugs and ultimately consenting to the marriage. Donnie relent for his misdeeds. Maya and Amit finally get married in a court ceremony attended by their loved ones.

== Cast ==
- Kenny Basumatary as Robin
- Poonam Gurung as Maya
- Bonny Deori as Amit
- Johnny Deori as Jhonny
- Montu Deori as Montu
- Bibhash Singha as Deben
- Tony Deori Basumatary as BUG Da
- Yatharth Agnihotri
- Sarmistha Chakravorty
- Mrigendra Narayan Konwar

== Release ==
Bollywood actor and martial artist Vidyut Jammwal gave financial support to the film. The film was planned to be dubbed in Hindi.

== Reception ==
Kalpa Jyoti Bhuyan of The News Mill opined that "Local Utpaat is not just about ‘utpaat’ in it. It is also about our local dreams, our local love stories and our very own personal successes and failures". A critic from Northeast Today wrote that "To write such a compact screenplay and blend it with the right amount of pure action and comedy needs mastery. Despite having some loose moments, the film will not disappoint its audience in general and particularly those who have been following Local Kung fu and Utpaat genre in Assam". An independent critic rated the film 3.5 out of 5.

== Box office ==
The film collected 40 lakh Indian rupees in its first week. The film grossed 1 crore Indian rupees by its 7th week.
