= Local Kung Fu 2 =

- Poster
- Directed by: Kenny Basumatary
- Screenplay by: Kenny Basumatary
- Based on: Comedy Of Errors by William Shakespeare
- Produced by: Kenny Basumatary; B P Deori; Durlov Baruah; Marquish Basumatary
- Starring: Kenny Deori Basumatary; Utkal Hazowary; Sarmistha Chakravorty; Eepsita Hazarika; Bonny Deori; Tony Deori Basumatary; Bibhuti Bhushan Hazarika; Yashraj Jadhav; Montu Deori; Amar Singh Deori; Suneet Bora
- Cinematography: Suruj Deka
- Music by: Derrick Corriea; Tony Basumatary; Utkarsh Dhotekar
- Production company: Kenny DB Films
- Distributed by: Kuhipaat Films
- Release date: 19 April 2017
- Running time: 124 minutes
- Country: India
- Language: Assamese
- Budget: 30 Lakhs INR
- Box office: 45 Lakhs INR

Local Kung Fu 2 is an Indian Assamese language Kung fu Martial arts-comedy film. It is directed by Kenny Basumatary and produced by Durlov Baruah. It is the spiritual sequel to 2013 film Local Kung Fu. The film is based on William Shakespeare's The Comedy of Errors. The film-makers successfully raised money for post-production through crowdfunding and the film was released on April 19, 2017.

== Synopsis ==
The film is an action adaptation of William Shakespeare's Comedy of Errors with a twist. One pair of twins, which grew up in Guwahati, knows fighting, while the other pair, which grew up in Tezpur, doesn't.

Deep and Arun Mohan are twin from Guwahati. They are proficient in martial arts. They flee to Tezpur to escape from thugs. Meanwhile, Deepu and Tarun Mohan are their doppelganger twin living in tezpur. They run a business and aren't proficient in fighting. The wife of Tarun get suspicious when she saw her husband avoiding her, as well mistaking Arun for her husband Tarun. In the climax, Deep and Arun rescue Deepu and Tarun from thugs.

== Cast ==
- Kenny Basumatary in dual role as Deep/Deepu
- Utkal Hazowary in dual role as Arun Mohan/Tarun Mohan
- Sarmistha Chakravorty as Adriana
- Eepsita Hazarika as Lucy
- Bonny Deori as Biku
- Tony Deori Basumatary as Bob
- Bibhuti Bhushan Hazarika as GK
- Yashraj Jadhav as Pankhi Baba
- Montu Deori as Bhagin
- Amar Singh Deori as Mama
- Suneet Bora as Rahul
- Mrigendra Konwar as Mr. Possessive
- Rajib Kro as Gang leader (Cameo)

== Sound Track ==
This movie has 7 songs playing in the background of the movie.

Song Playback Singer

1. Kung Fu You: Tony DB
2. Jote Tote: Ambar Das
3. Pi: Manu and Chow
4. His name is G.K.: Bonny Deori
5. Kheli Meli Mon: Anisha Saikia
6. Maya Bhora Jibon: Utkol Hazowary
7. Boroxa: Utkol Hazowary

== Sequel ==
Kenny told reporter of possible release of Local Kung Fu 3 by winter of 2023. Local Kung Fu 3, the direct sequel to the first installment was released on 5 September 2024.

== See also ==
- The Comedy of Errors § Adaptations
