= Inspector Balram =

- Promotional Poster
- Directed by: I. V. Sasi
- Written by: T. Damodaran
- Produced by: Liberty Basheer
- Starring: Mammootty; Kiran Kumar; Murali; Urvashi; Geetha
- Cinematography: J. Williams
- Edited by: K. Narayanan
- Music by: Shyam
- Production company: Liberty Productions
- Release date: 26 April 1991
- Country: India
- Language: Malayalam

Inspector Balram is a 1991 Malayalam film directed by I. V. Sasi, scripted by T. Damodaran, and starring Mammootty. It is a sequel to the 1986 film Aavanazhi and was followed by a sequel, Balram vs. Taradas, in 2006.

The movie was produced and distributed by Liberty Productions. It was a commercial success and ran for over 240 days at the box office.

== Plot ==
Four years after the events of Aavanazhi, Circle Inspector Balram is now married to Seetha. They have a daughter and live a normal life. Seetha is then killed by Sathyaraj's men. Balram sends his daughter to be taken care of by nuns, along with the help of his superior officer, Commissioner Madhavan Nair. Balram faces his enemies, including Indira Shankar and Sayed Mohammad Shah, and Preethi avenges her father's death with the help of Balram.

== Cast ==
- Mammootty as Circle Inspector Balram
- Kiran Kumar as Sayed Mohammed Shah
- Murali as City Police Commissioner Madhavan Nair IPS
- Geetha as Seetha
- Manjula Vijayakumar as Indira Shankar
- Urvashi as Preethi Pillai
- Jagadish as Sudhakaran
- M. G. Soman as Sahadevan
- Kalpana as Sub Inspector Dakshayani
- Kundara Johny as DYSP Alex George
- Vincent as Customs Officer Nambiar
- Kunchan as Constable Radhakrishnan aka "Shamshyam" Vasu
- Augustine as Sub Inspector Ummer
- Ramu as Siddique
- Kanakalatha as Madhavan's Wife
- V. K. Sreeraman as Hussain Sahib
- Bheeman Raghu as D'Cruz Pereira
- M. S. Thripunithura as Krishna Pillai
- Ragini as Rajamma
- Kollam Thulasi as Chandrachoodan, Home Minister
- Vineeth Kumar as Jithu

== Box office ==
The film was a commercial success, and it attained cult status.

== Additional information ==
Some of the challenging shots in action scenes by the late cinematographer J. Williams have received recognition.
