= Balram vs. Tharadas =

2006 film directed by I. V. Sasi

- Cover
- Directed by: I. V. Sasi
- Written by: T. Damodaran; S. N. Swamy
- Produced by: Liberty Basheer
- Starring: Mammootty; Katrina Kaif; Mukesh; Siddique
- Cinematography: Sanjeev Shankar
- Edited by: P.C.Mohanan
- Music by: Jassie Gift
- Production company: Liberty Royal Productions
- Release date: 28 April 2006 (India)
- Running time: 162 minutes
- Country: India
- Language: Malayalam
- Budget: ₹3 crore

Balram vs. Tharadas is a 2006 Indian Malayalam-language action film directed by I.V. Sasi, written by T. Damodaran and S. N. Swamy, and starring Mammootty in the titular dual role, with Katrina Kaif (in her Malayalam debut), Mukesh and Siddique. It was a crossover sequel of the films Athirathram and Inspector Balram. Mammootty plays dual roles as police officer Balram and underworld don Tharadas, reprising his roles from the 1991 film Inspector Balram (also from Aavanazhi, its prequel) and 1984's Athirathram.

== Plot ==
A large cache of arms is dug up from the land owned by the local businessman Hussein Sahib. On investigation, Inspector Varma finds that Hussein Sahib has no idea about this, but the land was used by someone called Anali Bhaskaran. The Inspector, along with his colleague Sudhakaran, goes to arrest Bhaskaran, but they are given a good fight. As the police are being beaten, the screen alternates between a police jeep appearing on the scene and Anali Bhaskaran trying to stab people. Suddenly a hand appears in the scene and beats Bhaskaran.

He is still the same no-nonsense arrogant person, Balram, who is now a DSP who follows his heterodox ways of investigation. Anali Bhaskaran reveals under interrogation that Hussein Sahib's son Salim is involved. Hussein Sahib says that his son left the house sometime back, and he has no idea where he is. At this point, it starts raining characters as if it is the start of monsoon season. In a span of few minutes, we get three villains, MLA Rani, a DGP, Balram's boss, DYSP George, Policewoman Dakshayani, the Chief Minister, a minister called Mustafa, Srini, the editor of a yellow journal, and a policeman called Ummar. Balram concludes that Tharadas was behind all this, and the scene switches to Dubai.

After beating his associate, Tharadas meets the minister Mustafa and does some business. He also wants a favor from the minister. He wants a ring to be passed to his girlfriend Supriya, who is an actress. Once the people and linkages are established, the game is set in motion in an even faster pace. Balram concludes that the only way to trap Tharadas is to arrest Supriya. As expected, Tharadas lands in Kerala and takes on Balram, and tries to stop the actions of Balram. In the end, Tharadas shoots down DYSP George who was one of his ally who had turned against him, and this is witnessed by Balram, after which Tharadas surrenders to Balram.

== Cast ==
- Mammootty in a dual role as:
  - DYSP Balram (reprising the role from Aavanazhi and its sequel Inspector Balram)
  - Tharadas (reprising the role from Athirathram (film))
- Katrina Kaif as Supriya Menon
- Mukesh as CI Satheesh Varma
- Vani Viswanath as MLA Rani Mathew
- Siddique as DYSP George
- Prem Prakash as Nandakumar, Chief Minister of Kerala
- Jagadish as ASI Sudhakaran
- Augustine as SI Ummer
- Kunchan as SI Radhakrishnan aka "Samshayam" Vasu
- Kalpana as SI Dakshayani
- Gowri Madhu as Vaduthala Valsala
- Devan as DGP Madhavadas IPS, State Police Chief
- Abu Salim as CI Kasim
- Akhila as Jyothi, IB officer (fake)
- Sreenivasan as Sreeni
- Kundara Johny as DYSP Alex George, Anti Terrorist Squad
- Rizabawa as Hussain Sahib
- Spadikam George as Sunderashan
- Subair as Minister Musthafa
- Sadiq as Rafeeq
- Rajmohan Unnithan as a Politician
- Sreenath as Jayakrishnan, Customs officer
- Anil Murali as Williams
- Arun as Salim Sahib
- Santhosh Jogi as Shivankutty
- Mohan Raj as Anali Bhaskaran
- Chandra Lakshman as Shanimol, Salim's wife
- Ponnamma Babu as Hussien Sahib's wife
- Sukumari as Alex's mother
- Ambika Mohan as Alex's wife
- Poornima Anand as Radhakrishnan's wife
- Kulappulli Leela as Narayani (guest appearance)
- Afsal as himself in the song "Mathapoove.." (guest appearance)
- Anwar Sadat as himself in the song "Mathapoove.." (guest appearance)
- Rimi as herself in the song "Mathapoove.." (guest appearance)

== Music ==
No.	Title	Lyrics	Singer(s)	Length
1.	"Maathapoove"	Gireesh Puthenchery	Jassie Gift, Anwar Sadath, Afsal, Girish, Rimi Tomy	4:03
2.	"Neelathadaakangalo (Female)"	Kaithapram	Delsy Ninan	4:09
3.	"Neelathadaakangalo (Male)"	Kaithapram	K. J. Yesudas	4:09

== Release ==
The film was released on 28 April 2006. The film got a strong opening figures.
