= Local Kung Fu 3 =

Assamese action comedy film

- Directed by: Kenny Basumatary
- Screenplay by: Kenny Basumatary
- Produced by: Kenny Basumatary
- Starring: Kenny Basumatary; Utkal Hazowary; Bonny Deori; Tony Deori Basumatary; Bibhuti Bhushan Hazarika; Montu Deori; Amar Singh Deori
- Release date: 5 September 2024
- Country: India
- Language: Assamese
- Budget: ₹75 lakhs INR
- Box office: est. ₹2.31 crore INR

Local Kung Fu 3 is an Indian Assamese language Kung fu martial arts-comedy film. It is directed and produced by Kenny Basumatary. It is the third installment in Local Kung Fu (film series) and direct sequel to 2013 Local Kung Fu.

== Plot ==
The story picks up a few years after the events in Local Kung Fu. The troublesome trio of Dulu, Tansen, and Koku has continued and expanded their thuggery activities. However, one of their actions inadvertently led to destroying their childhood teacher's dream of giving education to underprivileged children. The story follows the trio as they try to mend their mistakes, facing new adversaries and meeting new friends in their endeavour.

== Cast ==
- Kenny Basumatary as Charlie
- Utkal Hazowary as Dulu
- Binny Nurwal as Tsetan
- Bonny Deori as Bonzo
- Rimpi Das
- Bibhash Singha as Tansen
- Manab Saikia as Koku
- Amar Singha Deori as Charlie's Uncle
- Tony Deori Basumatary as Montu
- Bibhuti Bhushan Hazarika as Teacher

== Reception ==
EastMojo give the film 2/5, praising the film action as "well-designed, and executed with passion", but criticised its "choppy writing and storytelling", "poor writing, execution, and direction".

== Future ==
Kenny confirmed there might be Local Kung Fu 4, if they have a worthy and exciting story.
