= Kenny Basumatary =

Indian actor

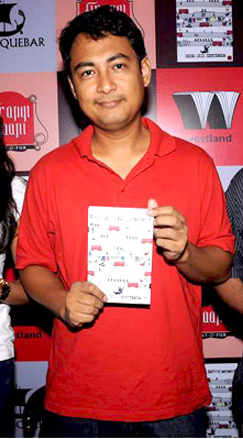
- Basumatary, writer of Chocolate Guitar Momos on the launch of his book.
- Born: Kenny Deori Basumatary
- Occupations: Actor, Film director, Novelist
- Awards: nominated for best Assamese film in the inaugural Filmfare awards for the Eastern region.
- Website: http://about.me/kennydb

Kenny Deori Basumatary is an Indian actor and film director. He has appeared in Hindi and Assamese films as an actor, and as director in Assamese films. He is popularly known for directing the Assamese martial arts comedy film Local Kung Fu and its sequel, which he also starred in. It was nominated for best Assamese film in the inaugural Filmfare awards for the Eastern region. The budget of the film was Rs.95,000.

== Early life ==
Kenny dropped out of college while pursuing Computer Engineering in IIT Delhi. After that, he worked as a newsreader for an Assamese News channel.

== Film career ==
In 2009, Kenny moved to Mumbai to attend film scripting workshop, in which his martial arts based script did not make it to top six. He then went on to act in commercials, TV serials and small roles in Shanghai, Phata Poster Nikla Hero and Mary Kom. Besides acting, he wrote a book, Chocolate Guitar Momos, published in 2011.

He moved back to Guwahati and with the help of family, directed Local Kung Fu in a budget of nearly 1500 US Dollars.

== Filmography ==
=== Actor ===
- Luv Ka The End (2011)
- Local Kung Fu (2013) as Charlie
- Raag (2014) as Alok
- Mary Kom (2014) as Jimmy
- Local Kung Fu 2 (2017) as Deep / Deepu
- Raagdesh (2017) as Netaji Subhas Chandra Bose
- Kammara Sambhavam (2018) as Netaji Subhas Chandra Bose
- Suspended Inspector Boro (2018)
- Bornodi Bhotiai (2019)
- Yaara (2020) as Bahadur
- Local Utpaat (2022)
- Ki Kowa Dosti (2023)
- Jawan (2023)
- Sam Bahadur (2023)
- Local Kung Fu 3 (2024) as Charlie

=== Television ===
- Paatal Lok Season 2 (2025) as DIG Kohima

=== Director ===
- Local Kung Fu (2013)
- Local Kung Fu 2 (2017)
- Suspended Inspector Boro (2018)
- Tomar Opekhyat (Web series) (2021)
- Local Utpaat (2022)
- Ki kowa Dosti (2023)
- Jiya (2024)
- Bibo Binanao (2024)
- Local Kung Fu 3 (2024)
- Local Bhoot (2026)
