= Aval Appadithan 2 =

2023 Tamil film

- Theatrical release poster
- Directed by: Ra. Mu. Chidambaram
- Written by: Ra. Mu. Chidambaram
- Produced by: Syed Abdagir
- Starring: Syed Abdagir; Sneha Parthibaraja; Rajeshwari
- Cinematography: Vedha Selvam
- Music by: Aravind Siddharth
- Production company: Yun Flicks
- Release date: 21 July 2023
- Country: India
- Language: Tamil

Aval Appadithan 2 is a 2023 Indian Tamil-language film directed by Ra. Mu. Chidambaram and starring Syed Abdagir, Sneha Parthibaraja and Rajeshwari in the lead roles. It was released on 21 July 2023.

== Cast ==
- Syed Abdagir as Ramu
- Sneha Parthibaraja as Manju
- Rajeshwari
- Vanitha Sri
- Sumithra
- Karthika
- Venkatramanan

== Production ==
The title of the film was inspired by C. Rudraiah's 1978 feminist drama Aval Appadithan, and served as a separate film, rather than a sequel. The shoot of the film was completed in a single location within ten days. Lawyer-activist Sneha Parthibaraja, who had earlier received media attention for becoming the first Indian to obtain an official 'no caste, no religion' certificate', was cast in the lead female role.

== Reception ==
The film was released on 21 July 2023 across theatres in Tamil Nadu. A critic from Dina Thanthi gave the film a positive review, praising the way the makers had shown female independence and social responsibility. A reviewer from Kumudam, in contrast, gave the film a negative review.
