= Athirathram (film) =

- Cover
- Directed by: I. V. Sasi
- Written by: John Paul Puthusery
- Produced by: Raju Mathew
- Starring: Mammootty; Mohanlal; Seema
- Cinematography: Jayanan Vincent
- Edited by: K. Narayanan
- Music by: M. S. Viswanathan
- Release date: 24 March 1984 (India)
- Running time: 127 minutes
- Country: India
- Language: Malayalam

Athirathram is a 1984 Indian Malayalam-language action thriller film directed by I. V. Sasi, written by John Paul and starring Mammootty, Mohanlal, and Seema. Mammootty's character Tharadas re-appears in Sasi's 2006 film Balram vs. Tharadas.

Athirathram was one of the films that elevated the leading actor Mammootty to a star status.

== Plot ==
Tharadas is a smuggler whose uncle was murdered by Rajesh. Rajesh is married to Thulasi who was once in love with Tharadas. Tharadas kills Rajesh in a particular situation and Tharadas feels guilt ridden on Rajesh's murder. Rajesh's partner Prasad and Thulasi get revenge on Tharadas, and finally Tharadas surrenders to Prasad, Chandru was caught by police.

== Cast ==
- Mammootty as Tharadas
- Mohanlal as Prasad
- Seema as Thulasi
- Shankar as Abu
- Raveendran as Chandru
- Lalu Alex as Charley
- Manik Irani as Goon
- Captain Raju as Rajesh
- K. P. Ummer as Thara Shankar
- Jalaja as Seetha
- Maniyanpilla Raju as Anthony
- Lissy as Cicily
- Achankunju as Hydru
- Rani Padmini as Naseema
- Kundara Johnny
- Sukumari as Kathamma
- Adoor Bhasi as Lona
- Kunchan as Radhakrishnan
- Meena as Annamma

== Box office ==
The film was a Blockbuster of 1984.

== Soundtrack ==
The music was composed by M. S. Viswanathan and the lyrics were written by Kavalam Narayana Panicker.

| No. | Song | Singers | Lyrics | Length (m:ss) |
|---|---|---|---|---|
| 1 | "Alakalile" | K. J. Yesudas | Kavalam Narayana Panicker | |
| 2 | "Kanikal" | K. J. Yesudas, S. Janaki | Kavalam Narayana Panicker | |
| 3 | "Kasthoori" | Vani Jairam | Kavalam Narayana Panicker | |
| 4 | "Minnam Minnam" | P. Jayachandran, Vani Jairam | Kavalam Narayana Panicker | |
