= List of Assamese films before 2000 =

This is a list of Assamese films before 2000.

== 1930s ==
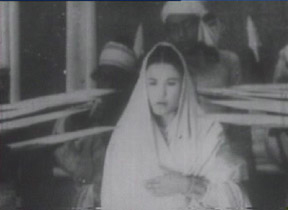
The first Assamese picture, Joymati (1935)

There are only two movies were released in this decade. Rupkonwar Jyotiprasad Agarwala produced the first Assamese Film Joymati in 1935, under the banner of Chitralekha Movietone. The second picture Indramalati was filmed between 1937 and 1938 finally released in 1939.

Year	Release date	Title	Director	Cast	Genre
1935	10 March 1935	Joymoti	Jyotiprasad Agarwala	Aideu Handique, Phanu Barua, Mohini Rajkumari, Swargajyoti Datta, Manabhiram Barua, Phani Sarma, Sneha Chandra Barua, Naren Bardoloi, Rana Barua, Shamshul Haque, Rajen Baruah, Putal Haque, Pratap Barua, Rajkumari Gohain, Subarnarekha Saikia (as Kheuti), Lalit Mohan Choudhury, Banamali Das, Prafulla Chandra Barua, Kamala Prasad Agarwala etc.	Drama
1939	-	Indramalati	Jyotiprasad Agarwala	Manoviram Barua. Raseswari Baruah, Phani Sarma, Thanuram Bora, Lalit Mohan Choudhury, Khargeswar Agarwalla, Kashi Saikia, Bedananda Sarma, Bhupen Hazarika, Jnanaviram Barua, Mani Lahiri etc.	Drama

== 1940s ==
Year	Release date	Title	Director	Cast	Genre
1941	4 April 1941	Monumoti	Rohini Kumar Baruah	Mohini (Assamese actress)	Drama
1944	6 September 1944	Rupohi	Parbati Prasad Baruah	Kannan Chakrabarty, Punya Konwar, Monika Nazir, Dankan Achao, Parbati Prasad Baruah, Padmadhar Chailha, Subha Dutta, Gauri Kakoti, Sailen Phukon etc.	Drama
1947	15 April 1947	Badan Borphukon	Kamal Narayan Choudhury	-	Drama
1948	16 January 1948	Siraj	Phani Sarma	Phani Sarma, Bhupen Hazarika, Bhaba Hazarika, Kalpana Bhattacharya Tiwari	Drama
1949	5 August 1949	Parghat	Prabin Phukan	-	Drama

== 1950s ==
Year	Title	Director	Music director	Release date	Awards
1950	Biplobi	Asit Sen	Shiv Bhattacharjee	16 January	
1952	Runumi	Suresh Chandra Goswami	Darpa Nath Sarma	Unknown	
1954	Sati Beula	Sunil Ganguly	Bhupen Hazarika	8 January	
1955	Nimila Onko	Lakshyadhar Choudhury	Purushuttam Das	16 September	
1955	Piyoli Phukon	Phani Sarmah	Bhupen Hazarika	2 December	First Assamese film awarded with Certificate of Merit
1956	Sorapaat	Anuwar Hussain	Mukul Barua	30 March	
1956	Smritir Porosh	Nip Barua	Brajen Baruah	6 April	
1956	Lakhimi	Bhaben Das	Brajen Baruah	28 September	
1956	Era Bator Sur	Bhupen Hazarika	Bhupen Hazarika	30 November	
1957	Maak Aru Morom	Nip Barua	Brajen Baruah	10 May	Certificate of Merit
1957	Dhumuha	Phani Sarmah	Bhupen Hazarika	27 September	
1958	Ronga Police	Nip Barua	Nijam	4 April	First Assamese film awarded with President's Silver Medal for Best Feature Film in Assamese
1958	Notun Prithibi	Anuwar Hussain	Mukul Barua; Rajeswar Bordoloi	4 July	
1958	Bhakta Prahlad	Nip Barua	Brajen Barua	14 November	
1959	Kecha xun	Phani Sarmah	Bhupen Hazarika	29 March	
1959	Saknoiya	Saiyo Barua	Mukul Barua	4 September	
1959	Puberun	Prabhat Mukharjee	Tarikuddin Ahmbed	18 September	1959 – President's Silver Medal for Best Feature Film in Assamese
1959	Puwaoti Nishar Sopun	Phani Sarmah	Bhupen Hazarika	2 October	
1959	Amar Ghor	Nip Barua	Brajen Barua	4 December	

== 1960s ==
Year	Title	Director	Music director	Release date	Notes
1961	Shakuntala	Bhupen Hazarika	Bhupen Hazarika	24 November	First portionally coloured Assamese film
1961	Lachit Borphukon	Lakhyadhar Choudhury, Prabin Phukon	Brajen Barua	29 September	
1962	Narakasur	Nip Barua	Brajen Barua	-	
1963	Itu Situ Bohutu	Brajen Barua	Brajen Barua	-	
1963	Matir Swargo	Anil Choudhury	Jiten Dev	-	
1963	Tezimola	Anuwar Hussain	Rajeswar Bordoloi	-	
1963	Maniram Dewan	Sarbeswar Chakrabarty	Bhupen Hazarika	-	
1964	Pratiddhani	Bhupen Hazarika	Bhupen Hazarika	-	President's Silver Medal for Best Feature Film in Assamese
1966	Lotighoti	Bhupen Hazarika	Bhupen Hazarika	-	
1968	Morom Trishna	Abdul Mazid	Bibekananda Bhattacharjee	5 January	
1968	Sangram	Amar Pathak	Asit Ganguly	19 January	
1969	Chikmik Bijuli	Bhupen Hazarika	Bhupen Hazarika	19 October	
1969	Doctor Bezbaruah	Brajen Barua	Ramen Barua	-	National Film Award for Best Feature Film in Assamese (Rajat Kamal)

== 1970s ==
Year	Title	Director	Music director	Release date	Notes
1970	Aparajeyo	Phani Talukdar, Atul Bordoloi, Munin Bayon, Gauri Barman	Salil Choudhury	6 May	
1970	Baruar Sonkhar	Nip Barua	Ramen Barua	-	-
1970	Mukuta	Brajen Barua	Ramen Barua	30 October	-
1971	Manab aru Danab	Indukalpa Hazarika	Jitu-Tapan	26 February	
1971	Oronyo	Samarendra Narayan Dev	Sudhin Dasgupta	-	National Film Award for Best Feature Film in Assamese (Rajat Kamal)
1971	Sekh Bisar	Dev Kumar Basu	Asit Ganguly	-	-
1971	Jog Biyog	Dibon Barua	Ramen Barua	31 December	-
1972	Lalita	Brajen Barua	Ramen Barua	18 February	
1972	Opoja Sonor Mati	Brajen Barua	-	-	National Film Award for Best Feature Film in Assamese (Rajat Kamal)
1972	Morichika	Amulyo Manna	Jitu-Tapan	15 December	-
1972	Hridoyor Proyojon	Gauri Barman	Ramen Barua	12 January	-
1972	Bibhrat	Phani Talukdar	Melodika	-	-
1972	Bhaiti	Kamal Narayan Choudhury	Ajit Singha	-	-
1972	Upograh	Bhaben Das	Jitu-Tapan	-	-
1973	Momota	Nailn Duwora	Basanta Bordoloi	-	National Film Award for Best Feature Film in Assamese (Rajat Kamal)
1973	Rashmirekha	Prafulla Barua	Upen Kakati	-	-
1973	Soontora	Nip Barua	Ramen Barua	-	-
1973	Uttoron	Monuronjon Suri	Ramen Barua	-	-
1973	Abhijan	Sujit Singha	Jitu-Tapan	-	-
1973	Anutap	Atul Bordoloi	Jitu-Tapan	-	-
1973	Ganesh	A.K. Films	Ajit Singha	-	-
1973	Bonoriya ful	Atul Bordoloi	Jayanta Hazarika	-	-
1974	Bristi	Deuti Barua	Jayanta Hazarika	-	-
1974	Porinaam	Prabin Bora	Ramen Barua	-	-
1975	Chameli Memsaab	Abdul Mazid	Bhupen Hazarika	-	National Film Award for Best Feature Film in Assamese (Rajat Kamal); Best Music director
1975	Toramai	Dibon Barua	Ramen Barua	-	-
1975	Ratanlal	Nalin Duwora	Nirmal Chakrabarty	-	-
1975	Khuj	Pulok Gogoi	Bhupen Hazarika	-	-
1975	Kachghar	Bijoy Choudhury; Pijushkanti Roy	Bhupen Hazarika	-	-
1976	Putola Ghor	Samarendra Narayan Dev	Tafajjul Ali	-	National Film Award for Best Feature Film in Assamese (Rajat Kamal)
1976	Polasor Rong	Jibon Bora	Bhupen Hazarika	-	-
1976	Pran Gonga	Robin Chetia	Upen Kakoti	-	-
1976	Adalot	Dilip Deka	Jitu-Tapan	-	-
1976	Gonga Silonir Pakhi	Padum Barua	Padum Barua	-	-
1977	Bonohonsho	Abdul Mazid	Bhupen Hazarika	-	-
1977	Dharmakai	Bhaben Das	Jayanta Hazarika	-	-
1977	Notun Asha	Prabir Mitra	Jayanta Hazarika	-	-
1977	Paap aru Prayochitta	Anuwar Hussain	Ramen Choudhury	-	-
1977	Sondhyaraag	Bhabendra Nath Saikia	Ramen Choudhury, Indreswar Sarmah, Prabhat Sarmah	5 August	National Film Award for Best Feature Film in Assamese (Rajat Kamal); First Assamese film played in Indian Panorama.
1977	Soonma	Nip Barua	Ramen Barua	-	-
1978	Phaguni	Shiva Prasad Thakur	Upen Kakoti	-	-
1978	Niyoti	Indukalpa Hazarika	Jayanta Hazarika	-	-
1978	Bonjui	Abdul Mazid	Bhupen Hazarika	-	-
1978	Kallol	Atul Bordoloi	Rudra Barua	-	National Film Award for Best Feature Film in Assamese (Rajat Kamal)
1978	Morom	Dibon Barua	Ramen Barua	-	-
1978	Moromi	Dwijendra Narayan Dev	Ramen Barua	-	-
1979	Mon Projapoti	Bhupen Hazarika	-	-	
1979	Megh	Atul Bordoloi	Jitu-Tapan	-	-
1979	Meghmukti	Bandhu	Khagen Mahanta	-	-
1979	Nishar Sokulu	Dev Kumar Barua	Gourchand Mukharjee	-	-
1979	Srimoti Mohimamoyee	Pulok Gogoi	Kul Atul	-	-
1979	Sunor Horin	Samrendra Narayan Dev	Tafajjul Ali	-	-
1979	Ashroy	Dulal Roy	Ramen Barua	-	-
1979	Bishesh Erati	Upen Kakati	Upen Kakati	-	-
1979	Duronit Rong	Jons Moholiya	Ajit Singha	-	-
1979	Rangdhali	Dwijendra Narayan Dev	Hemen Hazarika	-	-
