= Aideu =

- Directed by: Arup Manna
- Produced by: Nabamika Barthakur
- Starring: Aideu Handique, Chandana Sarmah; Nabamika Borthakur; Sopunti Bordoloi
- Cinematography: Arup Manaa
- Music by: Manash Hazarika
- Production companies: Trinayon Media Foundation, Nagaon
- Release date: 8 February 2007
- Running time: 81 Minutes
- Country: India
- Language: Assamese

Aideu (Behind the Screen) is an Assamese film produced by the Nagaon-based organization Trinayan Media Foundation and directed by Arup Manna. It was released at the Mumbai International Film Festival on 8 February 2007 and screened at the Pune International Film Festival, Delhi Habitat Film Fest and the 25th Munich International Film Festival. The film was shot in 16 mm format with a modest budget of Rs 1,600,000.

== Plot ==
The film concerns the tragic life and times of the first actress in Assamese cinema, Aideu Handique. Handique made her debut in the 1935 film Joymoti. She died in 2002.

== Cast ==
- Chandana Sarmah as Aideu Handique
- Prasanta Kumara Das as Jyotiprasad Agarwala
- Nabamika Borthakur as Aideu's mother
- Sopunti Bordoloi as Dimbo Gohain
- Pithuraj Goswami as Keshab, younger brother of Aideu

== Awards ==
Aideu was nominated for and would go on to receive Best Feature Film in Assamese at the 54th National Film Awards in India.

== See also ==
- Cinema of Assam
- National Film Award for Best Feature Film in Assamese
