= Joymoti =

Joymoti may refer to:

== Person ==
- Joymoti Konwari, the wife of the Ahom prince, and later king, Gadapani

== Film ==
- Joymoti (1935 film), the first Assamese-language film, by Jyoti Prasad Agarwala
- Joymoti (2006 film), an Indian Assamese-language film by Manju Borah
