= List of films banned in India =

This is a list of films that have been or are banned in India. This list includes titles that were refused a rating by the Central Board of Film Certification (CBFC) initially or permanently. The list also includes films whose release or production was or are blocked by the central or a state government, or by a legal institution. Also included are films that faced a virtual ban, after theatre owners were compelled to stop screening by non-government groups.

== Nationwide ==
Background shading indicates that the film was later allowed release in India, either in theatres or digitally.

Date	Film	Notes
1955	Summertime	Banned due to its depiction of an American woman falling in love with a married Italian man.
1959	Neel Akasher Neechey	It was banned for two months for overt controversies of sexual harassment overtones; it showed the troubles faced by an immigrant Chinese wage laborer in 1930s Calcutta.
1963	Gokul Shankar	It was banned for depicting the psychological motivations of Nathuram Godse, the assassin of Mahatma Gandhi.
1973	Garam Hawa	The release was held up by the censors for 8 months. The film depicted a Muslim family during the partition of India.
1975	Aandhi	It was banned during the Emergency by Indira Gandhi and subsequently released in 1977 after the Janata Party came into power.
1977	Kissa Kursi Ka	A political spoof, the film was banned by the Congress government for lampooning the Emergency. The master prints and all copies was lifted from the Censor Board office and burned by Sanjay Gandhi supporters. The movie was later remade with a different cast.
1971	Sikkim	The film was banned after Sikkim's merger in India in 1975, as it showed the Chogyal-ruled Sikkim as a sovereign state. The ban was lifted in September 2010.
1979	Khaak Aur Khoon	Film banned by India's CBFC. Based on the book Khaak aur Khoon, which was banned nationwide.
1984	Indiana Jones and the Temple of Doom	It was banned temporarily for its "negative" depiction of Indians because of a scene, set in India, where characters are served monkey brains. Monkeys are seen as sacred animals in Hinduism. The ban was later rescinded.
1987	Pati Parmeshwar	It was denied a rating by the Censor for depicting a woman in "ignoble servility" of her husband. Later, the Bombay High Court allowed its release.
1993	Kuttrapathirikai	The film was completed in 1993. As it had Rajiv Gandhi's assassination as a backdrop, it was not released until 2007.
1994	Bandit Queen	It was banned temporarily by the Delhi High Court after Phoolan Devi, the subject of the film's story, challenged its authenticity.
1996	Kama Sutra: A Tale of Love	It was banned due to sexual content. The version released in India had 2 minute cut of nudity.
1996	Fire	On its opening day in India, some film theatres were attacked by Hindu fundamentalists for depicting a lesbian relationship. The film was withdrawn and sent back to the Censor Board. Later it was released uncut.
2001	Paanch	It was banned for glorifying drugs, sex and violence, later certified with cuts but went unreleased.
2003	Hawayein	The film, set against the backdrop of the 1984 anti-Sikh riots, is banned in the Indian states of Delhi, J&K, Haryana and Punjab.
2004	The Pink Mirror	The film was denied a rating for its homosexual content.
2004	Final Solution	The documentary film was banned by the Censor Board for being provocative and under concerns that it may trigger communal violence. It was based on the 2002 Gujarat violence. But, it was cleared after some months.
2004	Hava Aney Dey	The movie was not approved by the Censor Board because the director didn't accept the suggested 21 cuts.
2005	Black Friday	The movie was based on the 1993 Bombay bombings. The release was blocked until the verdict of the lawsuit by the Bombay High Court on the petition of the under-trials. The film was originally set to be released in India on 28 January 2005. The producers appealed in the Supreme Court but the High Court order was upheld. The movie finally saw its release on 9 February 2007.
2005	Amu	This movie, based on the 1984 anti-Sikh riots, was initially denied a rating. The film was later given an adult rating after some audio-cuts.
2005	Water	The movie faced opposition during its shooting from hardline Hindu organizations in Varanasi. The sets were destroyed. The Uttar Pradesh government decided to stop the shooting on 31 January 2000. The shooting was shifted to Sri Lanka later. The movie was released in India much later, in March 2007.
2009	Had Anhad	The Central Board of Film Certification refused a certificate to this Shabnam Virmani documentary without cuts. In 2011, Delhi High Court allowed the film to be released uncut and asked the Union of India to pay ₹10,000 to the petitioner as legal fees.
2010	Gandu	The film was banned in India due to explicit sexual scenes.
2011	The Girl with the Dragon Tattoo	It was banned for its scenes of rape and torture. The Central Board of Film Certification demanded that these scenes be cut, which the director David Fincher refused to do.
2011	Chatrak	The movie wasn't allowed a theatrical release due to its sexual content.
2013	Papilio Buddha	Initially banned due to its criticism of Mahatma Gandhi, its released was allowed after the anti-Gandhi speeches were muted and/or blurred.
2014	Gurjar Aandolan	This film was banned by Rajasthan Government after the Intelligence Bureau (Rajasthan Government) watched this movie in Laxmi Talkies, Jaipur, on the day of its release on 17 October 2014. This film was based on Gurjar agitation in Rajasthan in 2008 by the Gurjar Leader Colonel Kirori Singh Bainsla. Many newspapers and media reported this ban on 17 and 18 October 2014.
2014	No Fire Zone	The Sri Lankan Civil War documentary was not allowed for public screening by the Censor Board because it depicted the war crimes covered up by the Government of Sri Lanka and showed the real sufferings of Tamils whom Indian Government felt resentful for. Director Callum Macrae decided to release the film on the internet to circumvent the ban.
2014	Kaum De Heere	The film was banned by the central government after the Intelligence Bureau had warned that the film may cause communal tensions. The film glorified the assassins of former Prime Minister Indira Gandhi.
2015	Fifty Shades of Grey	The film was not given a rating by the Censor Board, even after voluntary cuts by the distributor.
2015	Main Hoon Rajinikanth	Notable south Indian actor Rajinikanth moved the Madras High Court to stop the release of this film stating that it violated his personality rights. A stay was granted, and the makers of the movie were directed to not use the superstar's name, image or likeness. The director Faisal Saif later said he had shown the film to the actor and his lawyers to assure them. The film's title was later changed to Main Hoon Part-Time Killer.
2015	Unfreedom	The film was denied a rating by the Censor Board. The film examined same sex relationships and religious fundamentalism in India. The director Raj Amit Kumar was told by the Board that film will cause clashes between Hindus and Muslims, and will provoke "unnatural passions". The film's streaming was later allowed through Netflix in India.
2015	India's Daughter	This television documentary about the 2012 Delhi gang rape was prevented from being broadcast by a stay order from a court, due to perceived negative public sentiment including remarks defending the rape which drew public outcry in India when the film was shown. The movie was uploaded to YouTube and the Indian government requested it be removed.
2015	Patta Patta Singhan Da Vairi	The movie was initially denied clearance by CBFC, but was later cleared by the Film Certificate Appellate Tribunal (FCAT).
2015	Porkalathil Oru Poo	The movie is about the real life of Isaipriya, a television journalist raped and murdered by members of the Sri Lankan Army during the final stages of the Sri Lankan Civil War. It was denied clearance by CBFC as it would damage India-Sri Lanka relations.
2015	The Mastermind Jinda Sukha	The film was cleared by the CBFC but banned by the Minister of Home Affairs. The film is based on the lives of the assassins of General Arun Shridhar Vaidya. The makers of the film decided to release it overseas.
2015	The Painted House	The CBFC denied a rating to film for containing severe nudity. There were three scenes where the breasts and the buttocks of the female lead were fully visible while being nude. They suggested that those three scenes should be blurred or deleted. The filmmakers remained firm on their decision of not doing so and the film was banned. However the filmmakers challenged this decision in the High Court where they eventually won the case. The court then reversed the ban and gave clearance to the film and it was released without any cuts with an 'A' certificate.
2015	Muttrupulliyaa	The film, based on the aftermath of the Sri Lankan Civil War, was in banned in India by the CBFC as it would damage Indo-Sri Lanka relations though the film was screened in Sri Lanka itself. The ban was later lifted by the Film Certification Appellate Tribunal. However, the filmmaker had to morph the Liberation Tigers of Tamil Eelam flags, cut out photographs of its slain leaders and state that the film was a work of fiction inspired by real events.
2016	An Insignificant Man	The CBFC initially denied a rating to this documentary. The film was later allowed to be released.
2016	Mohalla Assi	The CBFC denied a rating to the film. The film deals with the commercialisation of the pilgrimage city Varanasi. On 11 December 2017, Delhi High Court allowed the release of the film with one cut and adult certification, setting aside the order of CBFC.
2016	Dharam Yudh Morcha	This movie is related to Punjabi Suba movement and a period of militancy. Indian release of the film banned by the CBFC.
2017	Neelam	The film, based on the Sri Lankan Civil War and the rise of the Tamil Groups including the LTTE, ran into trouble with the CBFC with the board refusing to certify the movie as it would damage India-Sri Lanka relationship.
2017	Toofan Singh	The CFBC banned this movie about Khalistan Liberation Force member Toofan Singh in 2016. The movie was released internationally in 2017.
2022	Anthem for Kashmir	This short film on human rights abuses in Kashmir was blocked for viewership in India on YouTube by the Government of India through a notice from the Ministry of Electronics and Information Technology (MEITY). No reason was cited in this Ministry notice for the censorship. The film is available to watch on YouTube using a VPN in India and without a VPN outside India.
2023	India: The Modi Question	This BBC documentary examining the role of the Indian prime minister Narendra Modi in the Gujarat riots of 2002 was blocked by the Government of India.
2024	Santosh	The internationally acclaimed Santosh has been denied certification for theatrical release in India after the Central Board of Film Certification (CBFC) objected to its portrayal of police brutality, caste discrimination, and misogyny.
2024	Maharaj	The Gujarat High Court stayed the release of this Netflix film in India after accepting a petition. The petition filed by the Pushtimarga Sampradaya claimed that the film hurt their religious sentiments. The Court later allowed the film to be released.
2025	Shaadi Ke Director Karan Aur Johar	The film was banned by Bombay High Court for allegedly misusing Hindi filmmaker Karan Johar's name.
2025	Abir Gulaal	Following Pahalgam terror attack in April 2025, which resulted in significant casualties, the film's release faced substantial opposition. Indian government sources confirmed that the movie would not be allowed to release in India due to heightened political tensions between Pakistan and India and calls for a ban on Pakistani artists in Indian cinema. Vaani Kapoor faced backlash for working with Pakistani actor Fawad Khan in the film.
2025	Sardaar Ji 3	Following a terror attack in Pahalgam that worsened India–Pakistan relations, Sardaar Ji 3 was banned in India. Federation of Western India Cine Employees (FWICE) demanded a ban on Pakistani artists appearing in Indian films. Diljit Dosanjh faced backlash for working with Pakistani actress Hania Aamir in the film. Dosanjh’s release of a new poster of the film with Hania’s image further fueled debate.
2026	Satluj	Its release was stalled for 3 years because of the CBFC demanded 127 cuts. It was digitally released on ZEE5 on 3 July 2026.The film was taken down from ZEE5 around 2 days later for Indian viewers.

== Regional ==
=== Greater India ===
- 1921 – Bhakta Vidur: Banned in Karachi and Madras for political reasons. The film came right after Jallianwala Bagh massacre and Rowlatt Act. The character Vidura was moulded upon the personality of Mahatma Gandhi.
- 1939 – Thyagabhoomi: Banned in Madras, 22 weeks after release for supporting Congress and the Independence movement.

=== Andhra Pradesh and Telangana ===
- 2006 – The Da Vinci Code: It was banned after some Christians and Muslim organisations, who took offence, protested. Later, the ban was lifted by the Andhra Pradesh High Court.
- 2011 – Aarakshan: It was banned on 11 August 2011 due to concerns that it may hurt weaker sections of the society. On 14 August 2011, the ban was revoked.
- 2013 – Jabardasth: It was banned in 2013 due to copyright infringement of Yashraj Studios' movie Band Baaja Baaraat.

=== Assam ===
- 1952 – Runumi: The film was suddenly banned by then Government of Assam headed by chief minister Bishnuram Medhi due to undisclosed reasons.
- 2005 – Tango Charlie: The film was allegedly poorly researched and defamed the Bodo community.
- 2023 – Sri Raghupati: The film was banned on 1 June 2023, a day before the release date, over allegations of breach of contract with former producer Suruj Sarma. The ban was lifted on 5 June 2023.

=== Chhattisgarh ===
- 2015 – MSG-2 The Messenger: The film was banned in Chhattisgarh for hurting sentiments of Adivasi community.

=== Goa ===
- 2006 – The Da Vinci Code: It was banned considering "public sentiments" after protests by Christian organisations.

=== Gujarat ===
- 2005 – Chand Bhuj Gaya: This film, which has the Godhra train burning as a backdrop, was not released in Gujarat.
- 2006 – Fanaa: It faced an unofficial ban due to the role of Aamir Khan, the lead actor, in the Narmada Bachao Andolan. Supreme Court of India directed that theatres wanting to screen the film should be provided police protection. But, most theatre owners decided not to screen it.
- 2007 – Parzania: Parzania faced an unofficial ban after Bajrang Dal coaxed theatre owners to stop screening the film. Bajrang Dal activist Babu Bajrangi, who was later incarcerated for murder, conspiracy and spreading hatred in Naroda Patiya massacre of Gujarat riots, had the opinion that it may disrupt communal harmony in the state.
- 2009 – Firaaq: Firaaq was allegedly not released by many theatres due to political pressure because it depicted the 2002 Gujarat riots. But, theatre owners cited a revenue sharing dispute.
- 2017 – Padmaavat: Banned following controversies and threats of violence made by Rajput caste organization Shri Rajput Karni Sena.

=== Haryana ===
- 2017 – Padmaavat: Banned following controversies and threats of violence made by Rajput caste organization Shri Rajput Karni Sena.

=== Jharkhand ===
- 2015 – MSG-2 The Messenger: Film was banned in Jharkhand for hurting sentiments of Adivasi community (Tribal community).

=== Kerala ===
- 2012 – Pithavinum Puthranum: The film, originally completed in 2012, is awaiting approval from the Censor Board as of January 2015. The film is reportedly based on a book by Sister Jesme and the Sister Abhaya murder case.
- 2013 – Papilio Buddha: The Film was banned in India for its scenes of violence, and for its scathing critique of Gandhi's legacy. It is set among a community of Dalits, regarded as 'untouchables' in India, where they face caste oppression, discrimination and displacement.
- 2015 – Chayam Poosiya Veedu: The film was not given a certificate since there is a nude scene in it.

=== Madhya Pradesh ===
- 2008 – Jodhaa Akbar: The film was banned after protests from the Rajput community over Jodha Bai's depiction as Akbar's wife. The Supreme Court later lifted the ban.
- 2015 – MSG-2 The Messenger: The film was banned as it was an insult to Adivasis (Tribals).

=== Maharashtra ===
- 2008 – Deshdrohi: The film was banned in November fearing breakdown of law and order in the state. The film depicted the attacks against North Indians in the state. The ban was lifted in January 2009 by the Bombay High Court.

=== Nagaland ===
- 2006 – The Da Vinci Code: It was banned for portraying Jesus Christ and Christians in an 'objectionable' manner.

=== Punjab ===
- 2003 – Hawayein: After release in theatres of Punjab the movie was taken out from theatres and eventually banned for depicting events of 1984 Sikh Genocide, Sikh militancy citing peace and order issues. Film was eventually banned in Punjab and Delhi.
- 2006 – The Da Vinci Code: Chief Minister Amarinder Singh banned the film after an appeal by Punjabi Roman Catholic leaders.
- 2011 – Aarakshan: On 11 August 2011, the film about honor killings in India was banned for hurting the feelings of the weaker sections of the society. But the ban was lifted on 14 August 2011 after a preview screening.
- 2013 – Oh My Pyo Ji: The Punjab and Haryana High Court stayed the release of the film on the request of a producer; the request stemmed from a dispute between the two producers of the film.
- 2013 – Sadda Haq: The film about the insurgency in Punjab was banned in Punjab by the state government. The ban was lifted by the Supreme Court on 28 April 2013, after a special court screening.
- 2014 – Kaum De Heere: A film based on Indira Gandhi's assassins Satwant Singh and Beant Singh was banned by Censor Board. Eventually the film was released through YouTube.
- 2014 - 47 to 84: Film based on the insurgency in Punjab, India was banned. .
- 2014 - Dilli 1984: Film based on the 1984 anti-Sikh riots was banned citing 'peace issues'.
- 2015 – The Mastermind Jinda Sukha: A movie based on Harjinder Singh Jinda and Sukhdev Singh Sukha was banned following controversies. The movie was released abroad and later through YouTube.
- 2015 – MSG: The Messenger: The Punjab government banned Gurmeet Ram Rahim Singh's film MSG: The Messenger in the state.
- 2015 – Blood Street: The film depicts the religion-based (Hindu-Sikh) riots that took place in Punjab. It also highlights the brutality of the Punjab Police at the time. It was scheduled to release in 2014 but was banned by the CBFC. The release of the movie was allowed in the following year but only after the "problematic" parts were cut.
- 2015 – Nanak Shah Fakir: In April 2015, Punjab government and Chandigarh administration suspended the screening of the film, which depicted Guru Nanak, for two months (see aniconism in Sikhism).
- 2015 – Pata Pata Singhan Da Vairi: Based on the 1980s and 1990s insurgency in Punjab, its released was stalled.
- 2015 – MSG-2 The Messenger: On the release day, the film was banned by Mansa administration in Punjab but the ban was lifted later. However, theatre owners refused to screen it in Punjab citing law and order problems.
- 2016 – Santa Banta Pvt Ltd: The film was banned by the state government for portraying Sikhs in a denigrating and defamatory manner.
- 2016 – Dharam Yudh Morcha: Based on the life of Jarnail Singh Bhindranwale and involving events like the Anandpur Sahib Resolution, Operation Bluestar, 1978 Sikh–Nirankari clash, and the role of Major Shabeg Singh as an army officer, its theatrical release was banned which led to its release on YouTube.
- 2017– Kharkuwaad - Portrays police brutality during the insurgency in Punjab, depicted the clashes that took place between the Sikh community and the Punjab Police at that time.
- 2017 – Toofan Singh: A movie based on life of Jugraj Singh Toofan. The film was banned which led to its release on YouTube.
- 2017 – Bhagat Singh Di Udeek - The title translates to “The wait of Bhagat Singh”, it describes how a common man falls prey to the atrocities of the system and is forced to fight the system single-handedly. It was initially delayed due to some technical errors and also faced rejection by the CBFC.
- 2019 – Dastaan E Miri Piri: The film was banned in theatres for showing an animation of the sixth Sikh guru, Guru Hargobind. It was released on YouTube with many cuts and only portrayed a shadow of the fifth and sixth Sikh gurus.
- 2020 – Shooter:- The film was banned because it was a biography of gangster Sukha Kahlwan.
- 2022 – Supreme Motherhood: The Journey of Mata Sahib Kaur:- The film was banned in Punjab due to animation on Sikh Guru's family and especially some incorrect depiction of Sikh History as claimed by Sikh organisations.
- 2025 – Hind Di Chadar Guru Ladho Re:- The movie was about to be released on 21 November, but was banned in Punjab as it was based on the life of ninth Sikh Guru, which showed the Guru and family in animated form.
- 2025 – Emergency:- The movie was banned in Punjab citing peace and stability disorder.

=== Rajasthan ===
- 2008 – Jodhaa Akbar: The film was not released after theatre owners received letters written in blood from Karni Sena.
- 2017 – Padmaavat: Following controversies and threats of violence made by Rajput caste organization Shri Rajput Karni Sena.

=== Tamil Nadu ===
- 1987 – Ore Oru Gramathiley: It was banned for criticizing caste based reservations. The Supreme Court of India later allowed its release.
- 2006 – The Da Vinci Code: It was banned after concerns that it may hurt religious sentiments. Later, Madras High Court allowed its screening.
- 2011 – Dam 999: It was banned for allegedly spreading fear among people regarding the Mullaperiyar Dam.
- 2013 – Vishwaroopam: The film was banned after objections were expressed by Muslim groups regarding the portrayal of the Muslim community in a bad light. The movie was later released after seven scenes were cut.

=== Uttar Pradesh ===
- 2007 – Aaja Nachle: The movie was banned because the lyrics of the title song was allegedly humiliating the Dalits. The lyrics were later changed. The ban was lifted later after the producers apologized.
- 2008 – Jodhaa Akbar: The film was banned fearing breach of peace after protests from a Rajput group. The Supreme Court later lifted the ban.
- 2011 – Aarakshan: It had been banned due to objectionable dialogues. Later, Supreme Court lifted the ban. The film was based on the topic of reservations in jobs and education.

=== West Bengal ===
- 1992 – City of Joy: The film's shooting was banned in Calcutta for a while due to negative portrayal of the city.
- 2013 – Kangal Malsat: In February 2013, a revising committee of the CBFC refused to pass the film citing excessive use of abusive language, sexuality and frivolous approach in portraying of social movements. The film was cleared later by the Film Certification Appellate Tribunal after some edits.
- 2023 – The Kerala Story : In May 2023, the West Bengal government banned the film due to controversy over the portrayal of the love jihad conspiracy theory.

== See also ==
- Censorship in India
- Cinema of India
- List of books banned in India
- List of banned films
- Film censorship
- Moral police
