= Joymoti (2006 film) =

Joymoti the saviour
- Directed by: Manju Borah
- Screenplay by: Manju Borah
- Starring: Nita Basumatary; Rohan Doley; Bishnu Kharghariya; Taufik Rahman; Pranjal Saikia, Namita Boro Rajib kro
- Cinematography: Raju Mishra (Gold medalist cinematography)
- Edited by: A. Sreekar Prasad
- Production company: Prasad studio
- Release date: 2006
- Country: India
- Language: Assamese

Joymoti (The saviour) is an Assamese biographical film directed by Manju Borah. It was released in the year 2006. Shooting of the film was done in Ketetong village at Margherita, Assam.Miao Arunachal Pradesh

== Plot ==
The film is set in 17th-century Assam. The story is based on the life of Joymoti Konwari, a medieval Ahom princess of the Ahom dynasty who was tortured to death for not revealing the whereabouts of her husband Godapani and laid down her life for the sake of democracy.

== Difference with Joymoti (1935 film) ==
In this film Manju Borah, differs the story from the first Assamese film Joymoti released on 10 March 1935. In the previous film by Jyoti Prasad Agarwala the sacrifice of Joymoti for her husband took major importance.

My objective is to present Joymoti as a historic figure. She was a visionary, who through sheer foresight and unflinching determination, saved the Ahom kingdom at a time when it was passing through one of its worst crisis, marked by grave political instability. Manju Borah

== Cast and characters ==
- Nita Basumatary as Joymoti
- Rohan Doley as Gadadhar Singha
- Bishnu Kharghoria as Atan Burhagohain
- Toufique Rahman as Laluksula Borphukon
- Pranjal Saikia as Lachit Borphukon

== Achievements ==
- Screened at 37th International Film Festival of India (IFFI)
- Screened at Asian Film Festival
- Screened at Kolkata Film Festival.
- 2021 - Formed part of India @75 at 52nd International Film Festival of India

== See also ==
- Cinema of Assam
- National Film Award for Best Feature Film in Assamese
