= Kamaal R. Khan =

Indian film actor, producer and writer

Kamaal Rashid Khan
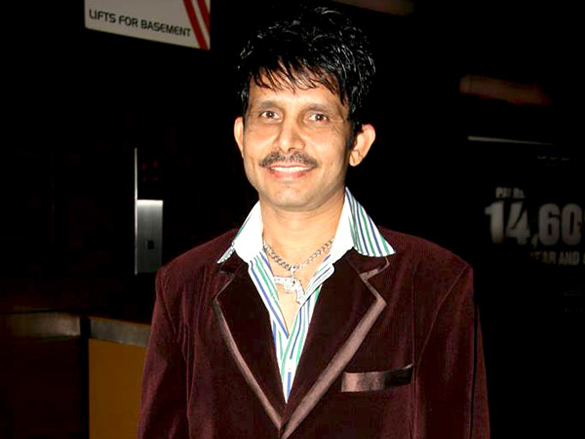
- Khan in 2010
- Born: 1 January 1975 (age 51); Deoband, Uttar Pradesh, India
- Other name: Kamal Rashid
- Occupations: Producer; actor; writer; YouTuber
- Years active: 2005–present
- Children: 2

YouTube information
- Channel: Kamaal R Khan
- Genres: Comedy; news; Review
- Subscribers: 1.3 million
- Views: 304 million
- Last updated: 20 October 2025
- Website: kamaalrkhan.com

Mohammed Rashid Mohammed Iqbal Kamaal (born 1 January 1975), better known as Kamaal Rashid Khan and often referred to as KRK or Kamaal R. Khan, is an Indian film critic, actor, producer and writer in Hindi and Bhojpuri cinema. He has produced or written most of the films he has starred in, notably the controversial Deshdrohi (2008), his only film as a lead actor. He is best known for his supporting role in Ek Villain (2014) and for participating in the reality show Bigg Boss in 2009. He has appeared in music videos as well.

Khan is also known for his controversial criticisms of Indian film personalities.

== Early life ==
Khan was born in a Muslim family in Deoband, a town in the Saharanpur district of Uttar Pradesh, India in 1975. He is the father of two kids, a son and a daughter. A businessman, he ventured into the Indian film industry during the 2000s.

== Career ==
He started out as a producer and writer for films and has also appeared in supporting roles therein, these include the Hindi romance-drama Sitam (lit. 'Tyranny'; 2005) directed by Partho Ghosh, the Bhojpuri films Tu Hamaar Hou (lit. 'You Are Mine'; 2006) directed by Jayprakkash Shaw, Munna Pandey Berozgaar (lit. 'Munna Pandey Unemployed'; 2007) directed by Manish Jain; romance and comedy films respectively.

Desh Drohi (lit. 'Treasonist', 2008), a crime-thriller, was his first film as a leading actor and dealt with organised crime in India and like his previous ventures was also written and produced by him. It received negative reviews from critics and was banned by the Maharashtra state government amid riot concerns for depicting the 2008 attacks on Uttar Pradeshi and Bihari migrants in Maharashtra, which was eventually lifted by the Bombay High Court.

His next was Jimmy (2008) directed by Raj N. Sippy, another crime film written and produced by Khan. He is best known for his supporting role in the film Ek Villain (The Villain; 2014), where he played the role of the titular serial killer's best friend, notably neither produced nor written by him. At the 2015 Ghanta Awards (humorous Bollywood film awards), Khan was awarded the Worst Supporting Actor for Ek Villain.

He also appeared in the third season of the reality show Bigg Boss, the Indian version of Big Brother, in 2009; he later appeared in the stand-up comedy show, Comedy Nights Bachao in 2015. Besides films and television, he has also starred in music videos including "Tum Meri Ho" (2019) sung by Javed Ali, which he also produced and wrote the lyrics for.

He has posted film reviews and box office analyses on YouTube. These videos, which often target Indian celebrities, have attracted controversy. Mika Singh, an Indian singer, released a diss track against Khan, "#krkkutta: Barking Dog – Mika Singh" in 2021.

He was a candidate in the 2014 Indian general election for the Lok Sabha (lower house of the Indian Parliament) from the Samajwadi Party. He quit the party citing differences with Samajwadi Party leader Abu Azmi's son Farhan Azmi and contested as an independent politician but did not win. He also has business interests in Dubai.

== Controversies ==
Khan has been at the center of controversies since 2008. Courts in Mumbai granted injunctions to restrict Khan from posting defamatory content against actor Salman Khan and producers Nikhil Dwivedi and Vashu Bhagnani in separate cases in 2021. He was arrested and detained in 2022 by the Mumbai Police, when returning from Dubai where he had been residing, for complaints (filed by Yuva Sena politician Rahul Kanal) on his 2020 tweets against Akshay Kumar-starrer Laxmii, a 2020 LGBT film dealing with transgender issues (hijras), and tweets against director Ram Gopal Varma. After spending nine days in judicial custody, he was granted bail for the tweets and for a separate 2021 sexual molestation complaint filed by model Taashaa Hayaat.

In March 2023, actor Manoj Bajpayee filed a defamation case against Khan citing derogatory remarks calling him a "drug addict" on Twitter in 2021. Khan was summoned by the Indore district court and issued an arrest warrant when he failed to appear.

In January 2026, Khan was arrested by Mumbai Police in connection with an incident involving the discharge of two bullets from his licensed firearm at a residential building in the Oshiwara area of Mumbai. Khan reportedly admitted to the firing but claimed it was accidental, occurring while he was cleaning the gun, and suggested that strong winds may have deflected the bullets.

== Filmography ==
=== Feature films ===
| Year | Film | Role | Actor | Director | Producer | Writer | Language | Notes | Ref(s) |
|---|---|---|---|---|---|---|---|---|---|
| 2005 | Sitam | Robert (don) | Yes | | Yes | | Hindi | Also lyricist | |
| 2006 | Tu Hamaar Hou | | Yes | | Yes | | Bhojpuri | | |
| 2006 | Munna Pandey Berozgaar | Villain | Yes | | Yes | | Bhojpuri | | |
| 2008 | Deshdrohi | Rajkumar "Raja" Singh Yadav/Killer Man | Yes | | Yes | Yes | Hindi | | |
| 2008 | Jimmy | | Yes | | Yes | Yes | Hindi | | |
| 2014 | Ek Villain | Brijesh | Yes | | | | Hindi | Supporting role | |

=== Television ===
| Year | Show | Role | Notes | Channel | Ref. |
|---|---|---|---|---|---|
| 2009 | Bigg Boss 3 | Contestant | | Colors TV | |
| 2015 | Comedy Nights Bachao | Guest | | Colors TV | |

=== Music videos ===
| Year | Song | Role | Language | Notes | Ref. |
|---|---|---|---|---|---|
| 2019 | "Tum Meri Ho" by Javed Ali | CBI officer | Hindi | Producer | |
| 2021 | "Deewano Ne" by DJ Sheizwood and Shaan | Male lead (himself) | Hindi | Lyricist | |
| 2023 | "Sun Zara" by DJ Sheizwood and Sonu Nigam | Male lead (himself) | Hindi | Lyricist | |
| 2024 | "Mere Saathiya" by DJ Sheizwood and Ankit Tiwari | Male lead (himself) | Hindi | Lyricist | |
| 2024 | "Baarish Mein" by Sulabh Nagpal | Male lead (himself) | Hindi | Lyricist | |
