= Dharam Yudh Morcha (film) =

- Promotional poster for the film
- Directed by: Naresh S. Garg
- Produced by: Karamjit Singh Batth
- Starring: Raj Kakra; Nitu Pandher; Shakku Rana; Amritpal Singh; Karamjit Singh Batth; Victor John; Sunny Gill; Sarabjit Purewal; Rajwinder Samralal
- Cinematography: Shivtar Shiv
- Edited by: Naresh S. Garg
- Music by: Anu Manu
- Distributed by: Karam Batth Films
- Release date: September 2016
- Country: India
- Language: Punjabi

Dharam Yudh Morcha is a 2016 Indian Punjabi-language semidocumentary film directed by Naresh S. Garg about the Dharam Yudh Morcha a Sikh movement in the Indian state of Punjab, chronicling the history of Punjab from 1947 to 1984 including the Punjabi Suba movement (to create a province for Punjabi speakers), the Anandpur Sahib Resolution and the insurgency in Punjab.

It is based on two-hundred plus eyewitness accounts and official documents with the information gathering and research for the film taking almost three years to compile and execute into a story and screenplay which was finished in July 2015.

The story was written by Karamjit Singh Batth and stars Raj Kakra and Karamjit Singh Batth in the lead, with Nitu Pandher, Shakku Rana, Amritpal Singh, Malkeet Rauni, Victor John, Sunny Gill, Sarabjit Purewal and Rajwinder Samrala in supporting roles. It was filmed on location in India, primarily in a village around Anandpur Sahib, as well as around the Golden Temple Amritsar, Moga and Mohali. The film was banned in India.

== Plot ==
The film depicts the story of Satnam Singh, who is a survivor of Operation Blue Star. His grandson finds a picture of young Satnam Singh and questions him about his past life. The story revolves around the era when Satnam Singh was a young man and he tells his grandson about being involved in the Punjabi Suba movement and the Dharam Yudh Morcha, as well as the escalation from peaceful protest to the violence which ensued when the Indian government, viewing the movement as secessionist, moved against the protestors with military force.

Historical events and topics featured in the film include The River Water Dispute, the Anandpur Sahib Resolution, the 1978 Sikh–Nirankari clash, the Dharam Yudh Morcha, the arrest of over thirty thousand Sikhs in two-and-a-half months in 1982, the life of Jarnail Singh Bhindranwale, and Operation Blue Star.

== Cast ==
- Raj Kakra as Surinder Singh Sodhi
- Nitu Pandher
- Shakku Rana as Surinder Shinda
- Amritpal Singh Billa as Gurnam Singh
- Malkeet Rauni as Prakash Singh Badal
- Karamjit Singh Batth
- Victor John
- Sunny Gill
- Sarabjit Purewal as Gurcharan Singh Tohra
- Rajwinder Samrala

== Production ==
=== Development ===
The script was completed in July 2015 after 3 years of extensive research into the events surrounding the Dharam Yudh Morcha movement, (from which the film takes its name), and the violent clashes between the Indian Government's military forces and Sikh protestors, who were viewed as a secessionist threat. It is a true story, based on historical research and eyewitness accounts from more than 200 witnesses.

=== Filming ===
The movie was filmed from late 2015 to early 2016 in India. Initially, filming was done in a village around Anandpur Sahib, however, when Shiv Sena protested against the production, filming was completed around the golden temple Amritsar, Village mehta, Village Rode (Moga), around Mohali (Punjab).

=== Music ===
The music for the movie was created by Anu Manu, with the background score by Beat Minister.

== Release ==
The movie was released on 16 September 2016.
