= Neha Mahajan =

Indian film actress

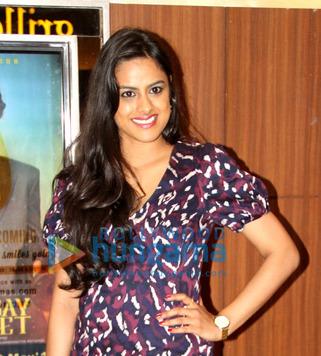
- Neha Mahajan at the premiere of Coffee Ani Barach Kahi
- Born: Talegaon Dabhade, Maharashtra, India
- Occupations: Actress; sitarist
- Years active: 2004–present
- Parent: Pandit Vidur Mahajan

Neha Mahajan is an Indian Sitar player and actress and model known for her works predominantly in Marathi and Hindi films, in addition to Marathi theatre. Mahajan made her debut in 2012, with the English-language Canadian-British production Midnight's Children directed by Deepa Mehta.

In 2013, Mahajan played Ophelia in Madhav Vaze's stage production of Hamlet in Marathi. She then appeared in Ajoba (2013), and Feast of Varanasi (2014). In 2015, she made her Mollywood debut as Vishaya in the indie drama The Painted House. Most recently Neha appeared in the 2019 Netflix series Leila, a dystopian drama. She was also seen in Rohit Shetty's action film Simmba. In 2020, she made her Hollywood debut in the action-thriller Extraction.

== Early life ==
Mahajan is the daughter of Sitar artist Pandit Vidur Mahajan, and has been accompanying him on his sitar performances while also performing solo. She was born in Talegaon Dabhade, Pune in the state of Maharashtra. Mahajan attended Trimble Tech High School in Texas, and earned her master's degree in philosophy from the University of Pune. She has been involved in theater and cinema and has worked in Marathi, English, Hindi and Malayalam language films.

== Filmography ==
Year	Title	Role	Language	Notes
2012	Midnight's Children	Young Naseem	English	
2014	Ajoba	Sushma	Marathi	
2014	Feast of Varanasi	Maya	Hindi	
2015	Coffee Ani Barach Kahi	Abha	Marathi	
2015	Nilkanth Master	Yashoda	Marathi	
2015	The Painted House	Vishaya	Malayalam	
2016	Aai Tujha Aashirwad		Marathi	
2016	Friends		Marathi	
2016	Youth	Yutika	Marathi	
2016	One Way Ticket	Urvashi	Marathi	
2017	TTMM – Tujha Tu Majha Mi	Rajashree	Marathi	
2018	Gaon	Sango	Hindi	
2018	Simmba	Kavya	Hindi	
2019	Leila	Pooja	Hindi	Netflix series
2020	Extraction	Neysa Rav	English	Netflix film
2021	Koi Jaane Na	Bindiya	Hindi	
2023	Gadad Andhar		Marathi	
2024	Babu		Marathi	
