= Gadad Andhar =

- Theatrical release poster
- Directed by: Pradnyesh Ramesh Kadam
- Written by: Pradnyesh Kadam; Laukeek; Chetan Mule
- Produced by: Avadhesh Singh Chauhan; Varsha Singh Chauhan; Nisha Chauhan; Aryan Chauhan
- Starring: Neha Mahajan; Jay Dudhane; Shubhangi Tambale; Akash Kumbhar; Arti Shinde
- Cinematography: Venkat Prasad
- Edited by: Saurabh Prabhudesai
- Music by: Rohit Shyam Raut
- Production company: Elula Future Vision PVT.LTD
- Distributed by: August Entertainment
- Release date: 3 February 2023
- Country: India
- Language: Marathi

Gadad Andhar (transl. Intense Darkness) is a 2023 Indian Marathi-language supernatural thriller film directed by Pradnyesh Kadam and produced by Elula Entertainment. The film was theatrically released on 3 February 2023.

== Cast ==
- Neha Mahajan
- Jay Dudhane
- Shubhangi Tambale
- Akash Kumbhar
- Aarti Shinde
- Chetan Mule
- Astha Thombare

== Release and marketing ==
=== Theatrical ===
The film was theatrically released on 3 February 2023.

=== Marketing ===
The teaser of the film was uploaded on 20 December 2022 and trailer was on 17 January 2023 by Rajshree productions and Zee Music Company on YouTube. The film was marketed as 'first underwater supernatural fiction film in Marathi cinema'.

== Soundtrack ==
Gadad Andhar

Soundtrack album by Rohit Shyam Raut
- Released: 19 January 2023
- Genre: Feature film soundtrack
- Length: 12:03
- Language: Marathi
- Label: Zee Music Company

Official audio
- Gadad Andhar - Full Album on YouTube

Music is composed by Rohit Shyam Raut and background score is by Adinath Patkar.

All music is composed by Rohit Shyam Raut.

Track listing
No.	Title	Lyrics	Singer (s)	Length
1.	"Dariya"	Abhishek Khankar	Rohit Shyam Raut	3:15
2.	"Angai"	Abhishek Khankar	Julee Joglekar Raut	3:37
3.	"Raya"	Rohit Shyam Raut	Divya Kumar	5:09
Total length:				12:03
