= The Painted House =

- English poster
- Directed by: Santosh Babusenan; Satish Babusenan
- Written by: Santosh Babusenan; Satish Babusenan
- Produced by: Fifth Element Film
- Starring: Neha Mahajan; Kaladharan Nair; Akram Mohammed
- Cinematography: Santosh Babusenan; Satish Babusenan
- Edited by: Vijil FX
- Music by: K. Santhosh
- Distributed by: Fifth Element Film
- Release date: 2015
- Running time: 102 minutes
- Country: India
- Language: Malayalam

The Painted House (Malayalam title: Chaayam Pooshiya Veedu) is a 2015 Indian Malayalam-language independent drama film directed by brothers Santosh and Satish Babusenan in their feature debut. The film stars Neha Mahajan, Kaladharan Nair, and Akram Mohammed. The film was mainly made in Malayalam and English, but it has official dubbed versions in Hindi and Tamil as Rangeen Ghar and Vaanam Poosiya Veedu respectively.

The Babusenan brothers were formerly cinematographers and producers in Mumbai, working for MTV, Channel V, STAR and others. In 1998 they made a short film, Twilight Dream, which was selected to the Split Film Festival in Croatia and the Mumbai International Film Festival. The Painted House was made after a gap of seventeen years.

== Plot ==
Gautam is a writer in the later stages of his life. While working on his book, Gautam suffers a heart attack and collapses.

The doorbell rings and Vishaya, a beautiful and seductive young woman, appears. She asks if she can stay the night and Gautam lets her. Their mutual attraction disarms and excites him. The next day a young man, Rahul, turns up seeking help. He repeatedly invites Gautam to visit him and finally, forcibly whisks him off to the sprawling deserted house on a hill. He slaps, kicks and verbally humiliates the old writer. Rahul threatens to kill Gautam if he tries to escape. Later Vishaya arrives in the house and tells Gautam that she is Rahul's partner in kidnapping him. They never tell him the reason for kidnapping him. Vishaya tells Gautam that it all probably is a story or a dream. Physical and verbal abuse of Gautam continues after his unsuccessful attempt to escape.

The old writer now fights back for his freedom as his soul searching nightmare begins. One where he is forced to confront every belief he has held about himself.

Once Gautam tries to get physical with Vishaya but Rahul arrives and beats him up. Later Rahul asks Gautam if he hated him. Gautam denies. Rahul tells Gautam to curse him and leave the house. Gautam says he wouldn't take the freedom at the price of filling his own heart with hatred towards Rahul. One night Gautam tries to hit Rahul with a metal rod while Rahul is asleep. Suddenly Vishaya arrives and screams. Gautam looks at her and freezes. When he sees in front, he finds Rahul and his cot have vanished. Vishaya too has vanished. Gautam experiences a heart attack and falls.

== Cast ==
- Neha Mahajan as Vishaya
- K. Kaladharan Nair as Gautam
- Akram Mohammed as Rahul

== Music ==
The film has no songs. A background score makes an appearance only at the end of the film. The score of the film was composed by K. Santhosh.

== Release ==
The Painted House was initially denied a CBFC certificate as it contains three scenes where the female lead is shown naked. The Central Board of Film Certification demanded that the three scenes be deleted, but the directors refused to make any alterations or deletions to the film. As a result, the film was banned in India. The makers challenged the CFBC decision in court and the High court cleared the film with no cuts. The makers posted an announcement regarding the same on the film's official Facebook page on 29 January 2016. The uncut film is available for viewing on YouTube.

== Festivals ==
In 2015 the International Indian Film Festival of Toronto invited the film to be screened there. It has also been selected to be In Competition at the International Film Festival of Kerala.
