= Shivtar Shiv =

Indian cinematographer

- Occupations: Cinematographer; Director
- Years active: 2015-present
- Known for: Dharam Yudh Morcha (film); Saggi Phull

Shivtar Shiv is an Indian cinematographer and director associated with Punjabi films.

== Career ==
Shivtar Shiv started his career as Cinematographer. Then he started working along in other fields like Direction and he started his career as an assistant D.O.P with Jatinder Sairaj. He is born and brought up in Nabha district of Punjab. He first worked as an assistant cameraman for ATN Punjabi channel. After that he did some TV serials. Also, He was the assistant of Rajesh Verma in TV serial 'India's Most Wanted'. Later, he worked as assistant cameraman in serial Virasat at Doordarshan and for lishkara channel where he assisted Akram Sheikh. Then, Shiv stepped into music videos where he was the assistant of Manjit Singh. He did more than 1200 music videos with Punjabi singers and directors.

Now, he has also become a D.O.P and Director. He directed Punjabi movie 'Saggi Phull' in 2018 and worked as cinematographer for movies like Once Upon A Time In Amritsar (2016) and Patta Patta Singhan Da Vairi (2015).

== Filmography ==
Year	Film	Cinematographer	Director	Notes
2015	Burf	Yes	No	
2015	Patta Patta Singhan da Vairi	Yes	No	
2016	Dharam Yudh Morcha	Yes	No	
2016	Once Upon a Time in Amritsar	Yes	No	
2018	Saggi Phull	Yes	Yes	
2019	Khatre da Ghuggu	Yes	Yes	not released yet
