= Deshdrohi =

2008 Indian film by Jagdish A. Sharma

- Theatrical release poster
- Directed by: Jagdish A. Sharma
- Written by: Kamaal Rashid Khan
- Produced by: Kamaal Rashid Khan
- Starring: Kamaal Rashid Khan; Manoj Tiwari; Hrishitaa Bhatt; Gracy Singh; Zulfi Syed; Aman Verma
- Edited by: Nasir Hakim Ansari
- Music by: Nikhil
- Distributed by: O.K. International
- Release date: 14 November 2008
- Running time: 139 minutes
- Country: India
- Language: Hindi
- Budget: ₹30 Million
- Box office: ₹8.90 Million

Deshdrohi (transl. Traitor) is a 2008 Indian Hindi-language action thriller film directed by Jagdish A. Sharma. It was scripted and produced by KRK, who also appeared in the lead role alongside Manoj Tiwari, Hrishitaa Bhatt, Gracy Singh and Zulfi Syed. Released on 14 November 2008, it was subject to negative reviews from critics, and is considered as one of the worst Bollywood films.

== Plot ==
The themes of the film consist of politics, prostitution, pimping, and corruption. At the start of the film, a man named Raja Yadav (Kamaal Rashid Khan) arrives in Mumbai from Uttar Pradesh searching for a watchman's job after leaving his father and neighbour, Neha, both behind in his village in Uttar Pradesh.

In Mumbai, Raja meets the gangster Shekhar, who also works as a watchman, and Sonia, who works for a drug dealer named Baba Kadam. At one point, Raja helps Sonia escape from an attack by a group working for another drug dealer called Rajan Nayak, Baba Kadam's rival. Sonia and Raja eventually fall in love.

After realising the difficulties of living in Mumbai as a North Indian, Raja tries to ask for help from Shrivastav, a corrupt North Indian politician. Mumbai's drug-trafficking mafia is assisted by politicians, and the media want to reveal the corruption prevalent in the city.

Due to his involvement, Raja is targeted by Rajan Nayak, who bribes a police inspector to kill him and Sonia; the hit fails and the inspector dies. The police pursue Raja and Sonia, who are also hiding from Rajan Nayak. Raja tries to get help from Shrivastav to no avail, and even Sonia's boss, Baba Kadam, abandons the pair.

Pushed to the limit, Raja decides to kill all involved, in which he is helped by Inspector Rohit Raghav, the new husband of Raja's village sweetheart.

== Cast ==
- Kamaal Rashid Khan as Raja Yadav
- Gracy Singh as Sonia Patil
- Aman Verma as Minister Shrivastav
- Hrishitaa Bhatt as Neha Rohit Raghav (dubbed by Mona Ghosh Shetty)
- Manoj Tiwari as Shekhar
- Kader Khan as Abdul Bhai
- Mukesh Tiwari as Rajan Naik, a corrupt politician
- Zulfi Syed as Inspector Rohit Raghav
- Ranjeet as Raja's father
- Avtar Gill as Raja's grandfather
- Aryan Vaid in cameo appearance in a song
- Yashpal Sharma as Baba Kadam
- Raza Murad as Chief Minister of Maharashtra
- Kim Sharma as Herself
- Nirmal Pandey as Deputy Chief Minister Nagesh Kulkarni
- Shiva Rindani as Encounter specialist Rajesh Sharma
- Arun Bakshi as Shrivastav's P.A.
- Anil Nagrath as Deshmukh, the informer
- Kim Sharma in a special appearance
- Rosa Catalano in a special appearance

== Music ==
Soundtrack was composed by Nikhil-Vinay.

- Ye Ishq Gunah - Shaan
- Tu Jaan Se - Zubeen Garg, Shweta Pandit
- Mera Vaada Raha - Udit Narayan, Mahalakshmi Iyer
- Ye Ishq Gunah (female) - Khushboo Jain
- Bewaja Yun - Sukhwinder Singh, Khushboo Jain
- Mere Halaat - Zubeen Garg
- Tujhe Dekhoon To - Shaan, Shweta Pandit
- Hum Karke Pyar - Shaan, Shreya Ghoshal

== Controversy ==
Deshdrohi was accused of exploiting the 2008 attacks on Uttar Pradeshi and Bihari migrants in Maharashtra. The head of the Central Board of Film Certification's Mumbai office opined that some of the movie's scenes were derogatory to a particular community. Maharashtra Navnirman Sena expressed their protests against the movie. The Mumbai police served a notice for a special screening to find any objectionable content that might trigger unrest. Due to the protests and problems with exhibitors, Deshdrohi's release was delayed to a week after its original date of November 7. The movie was banned by the state government of Maharashtra for 60 days under the Bombay Cinema Regulation Act, and its producers appealed the ban to the Bombay High Court. Deshdrohi was eventually released in Maharashtra on January 23, 2009.

== See also ==
- List of films banned in India
- List of films considered the worst
