= Gyanada Kakati =

Film actress (1932–2025)

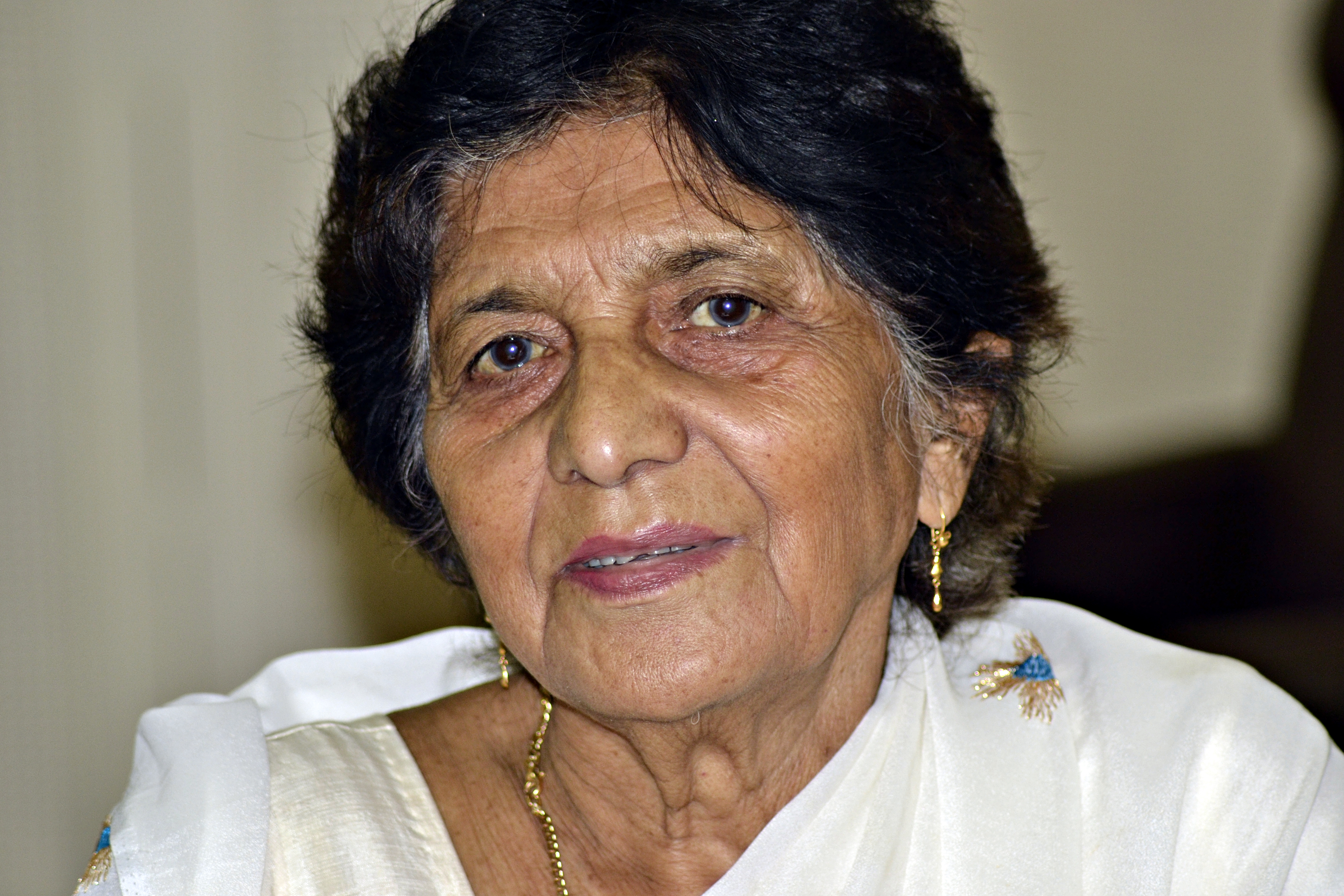
- Born: Gyanada Das; 1932; Shillong, Assam Province, British India
- Died: 8 January 2025 (aged 92); Shillong, Meghalaya, India
- Occupation: Actress
- Years active: 1949–1996
- Notable work: Puberun; Parghat
- Spouse: Lohit Kakati
- Parents: Deven Das (father); Bijoya Das (mother)

Gyanada Kakati (1932 – 8 January 2025) was an Indian actress and a singer associated with the Assamese film industry. She made her debut with Parghat in 1949 and has acted in Bengali films also. Her popular film Puberun was the first Assamese film to be selected for the International Film Festival held at Berlin. She even won the Bishnu Rabha Award in 2002 from the Assam Government.

== Background ==
Gyanada Kakati was born to Deven Das and Birja Das in 1932 in the undivided Assam's Shillong. Her ancestral house was in Panbazar, however they lived in Laban, Shillong due to her father's work. She was married to Lohit Kakati.

Gyanada Kakati died on 8 January 2025, at the age of 92.

== Acting career ==
Gyanada got the acting environment and support from her early age due to her father being a stage actor. Deven Das used to play in the initiative of a cultural show called Assam Club in Shillong. She performed a dance in a play called Sati Beula during her teenage years for which Bishnu Prasad Rabha praised her. Kakati started her acting career after her marriage only. She got praised for her performance in the film Parghat which was released in 1948, after which her acting career boosted.

After her performance in Parghat, she acted in various popular films like Piyali Phukan, Sarapat, Lakhimi, Ronga Police, Puberun, Saknoiya, Pratham Ragini, Puwati Nisar Sopun, Narkasur, Upar Mahala, Khekh Bisar, Priya Jan, Rag-Virag etc.

Her film Puberun (1959) was nominated in Berlin Film Festival in 1960, where she met with Hollywood actors and actresses like Sophia Loren, Cary Grant. She also acted in numerous Bengali films like Nilachaley Mahaprabhu, Gadher Mathe, Barma etc. She dedicated her career to the Assamese film industry for which she rejected a few Bollywood films, also one of them was Bandini.

Gyanada Kakati was also active in singing. She was a regular vocalist for the Akashwani centres of Shillong and Guwahati. Apart from that, she has also recorded her songs in gramophone.

== Filmography ==
| Year | Title | Role |
|---|---|---|
| 1948 | Parghat | |
| 1955 | Piyoli Phukan | |
| 1956 | Sarapat | |
| 1956 | Lakhimi | |
| 1958 | Ronga Police | |
| 1959 | Puwati Nisar Sapon | |
| 1959 | Puberun | Meghali |
| 1959 | Saknoiya | Lakhimi |
| 1962 | Narakasur | Basumati |
| 1971 | Khekh Bisar | |
| 1972 | Upar Mahala | |
| 1979 | Pratham Ragini | |
| 1993 | Priyajan | |
| 1996 | Rag-Virag | |
