= Puberun =

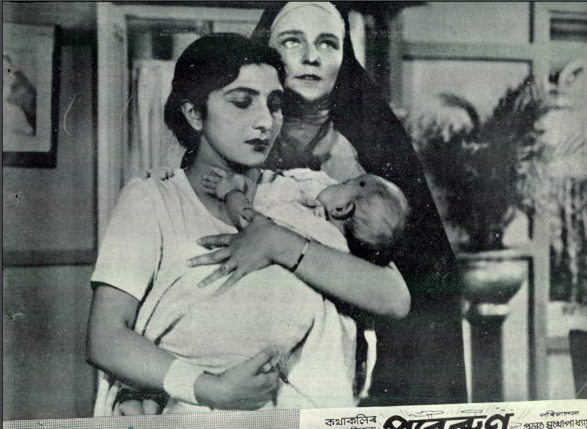
- Poster of 'Puberun'
- Directed by: Prabhat Mukherjee
- Starring: Gyanada Kakati; Tassaduck Yusuf; Margaret Anderson
- Music by: Tarikuddin Ahmed
- Release date: 1959
- Country: India
- Language: Assamese

Puberun is an Assamese language film directed by Prabhat Mukherjee of Kolkata and released in 1959.

== Awards ==
National Film Awards (India)

- 1959 – President's silver medal for Best Feature Film in Assamese

== See also ==
- Jollywood
