= Saknoiya =

- Directed by: Soilyo Baruah
- Written by: Durgeswar Barthakur
- Screenplay by: Durgeswar Barthakur
- Music by: Mukul Baruah
- Release date: November 1959
- Country: India
- Language: Assamese

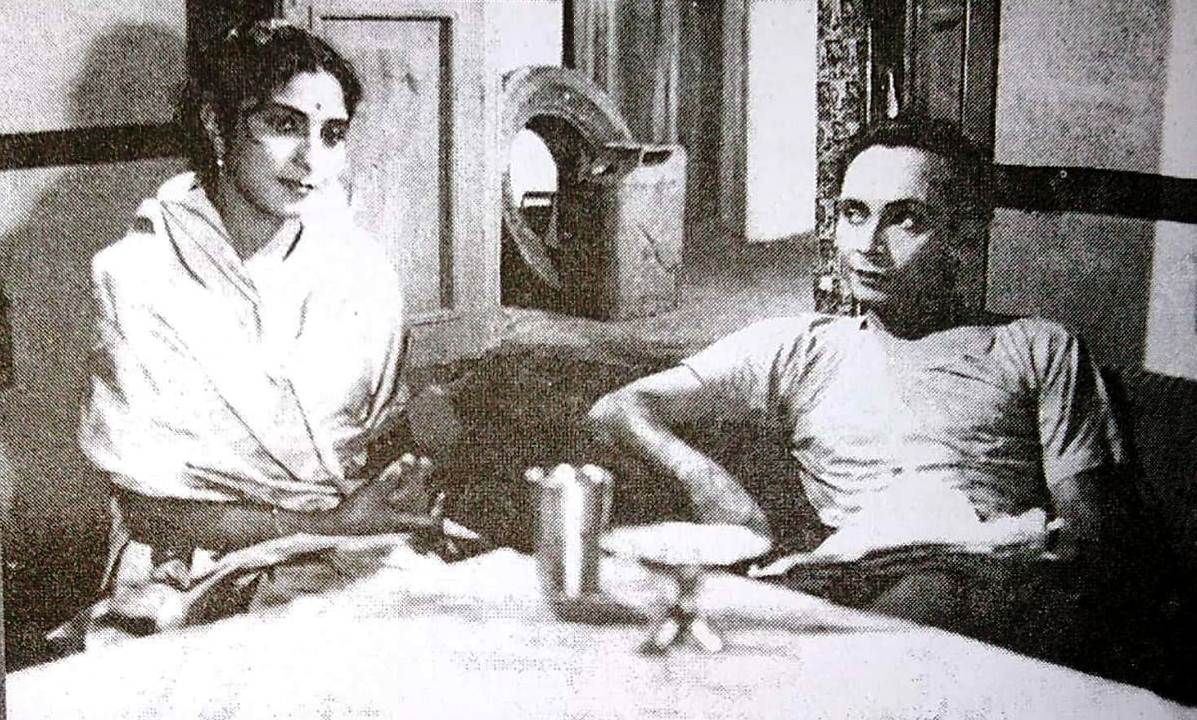
A scene from the movie 'Saknoiya' (1959)

Saknoiya is an Assamese language film directed by Soilya Boruah. The film was released in 1959 in the early days of Assamese cinema.

== Plot ==
The story revolves round the emotions of two brothers, one a taxi driver and the other a high official in a government office. Trouble breaks when the brother with high social status marries a lady who would not agree to reside together with a taxi driver.

== Production ==
The indoor shooting was done in Indrapuri Studio, Kolkata. The editing of this film was also done in Kolkata.

== Casts ==
- Gyanada Kakati
- Bina Baruba
- Tulsi Das
- Sorbeswar Chakravarty
- Bina Das
- Soilyo Baruah
- Anil Das
- Durgeswar Barthakur
- Saityen Choudhury

== See also ==
- Jollywood
