= Momota =

Momota (written: 百田 or 桃田) is a Japanese surname. Notable people with the surname include:

- Kanako Momota (百田 夏菜子; born 1994), Japanese idol, actress, and singer
- Kento Momota (桃田 賢斗; born 1994), Japanese badminton player
- Mitsuhiro Momota (百田 光浩; 1924–1963), Korean-Japanese wrestler
- Mitsuo Momota (百田 光雄; born 1948), Japanese professional wrestler and executive
- Yoshihiro Momota (百田 義浩; 1946–2000), Japanese professional wrestler and former ring announcer
