= Sister Jesme =

Indian nun

Dr. Sister Jesme
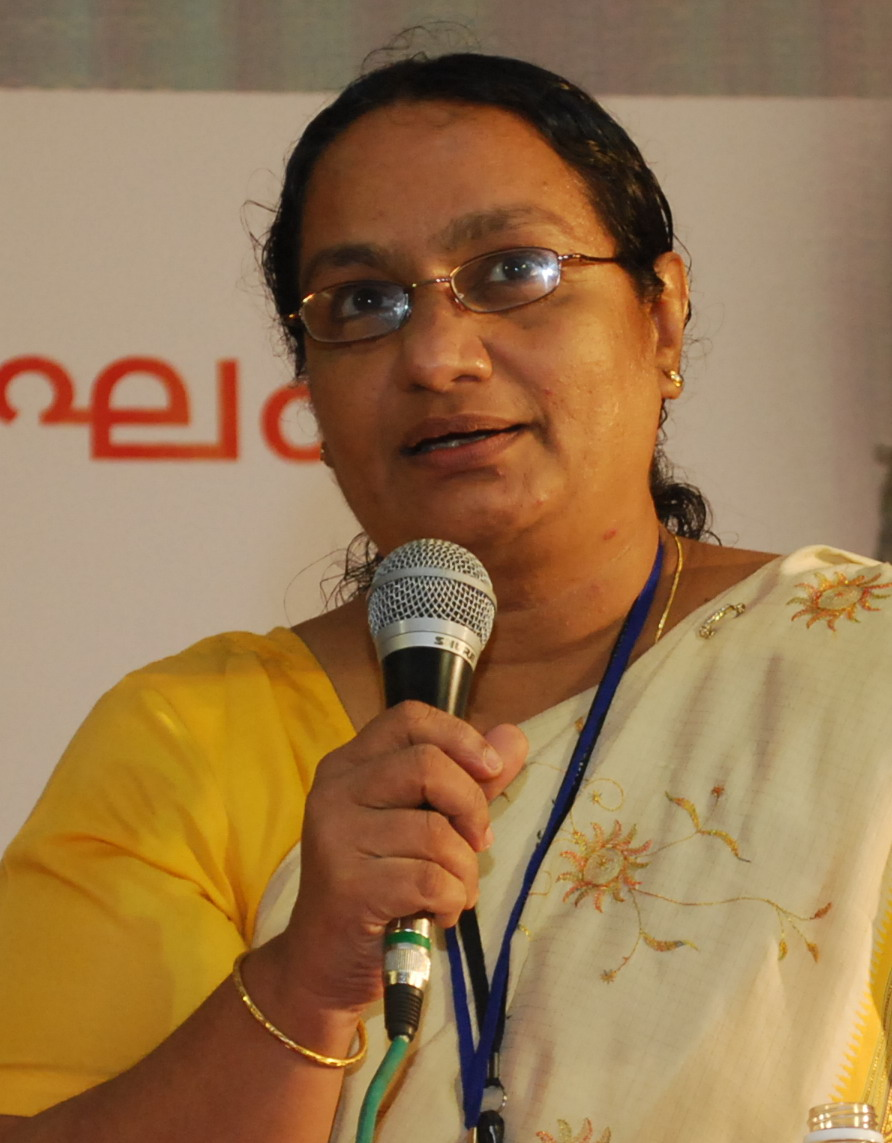
- Born: Jesme; 6 November 1956 (age 69); Thrissur, Kerala, India
- Occupations: Nun, Writer, Teacher
- Awards: Awarded for best 10 book by Balasahithya Institute in 2009

Sister Jesme is an Indian Catholic nun and writer. She is known as Dr. Sister Jesme.

== Biography ==
Sister Jesme was born on 11 June 1956, in Kerala.

Sister Jesme decided to become a nun when she was in college. She graduated with rank from the University of Calicut and completed M. Phil. She has a doctorate in English Literature.

She worked as a teacher and joined as vice principal of Vimala College, Thrissur from 2002 to 2005. In 2005, she joined St. Mary's College, Thrissur as Principal and served there till 2008. She resigned from her post as Principal.

She was a member of the Congregation of the Mother of Carmel (CMC), which she was forced to leave because of emotional torment after 33 years as a nun. Her life as a nun and her experiences within the Catholic Church in Kerala are recounted in her book, Amen - The Autobiography of a Nun. The Indian Express, reviewing the book, states it "details the humiliation, sexual abuse and mental torture at the seminary (Congregation of the Mother of Carmelites)".

== Books ==
- 2018- Veendum Amen (Amen Again) Autobiography Part-2
- 2016- Penmayude Vazhikal (The paths of womanhood) Novel.
- 2015- Geil Holy Hell & I Article Collection
- 2013- Mazhavil Maanam (Rainbow Sky) Article Collection.
- 2012- Pranaya Smarana (Amorous Memories) Novel.
- 2011- Amen (Tamil Version) Kalachuvadu Publishers.
- 2011- Njanum Oru Sthree (I too am a woman) Article collection.
- 2009- Amen (Malayalam)
- 2009- Amen (English Version) by Penguin Books.
- 2009- Amen (Hindi Version) by Penguin Books.
- 2009- Amen (Marathi Version) by Mehta Publishers.
- 2005- At the foot of the cross (Anthology of poems) English Version.
- 2004- Narrative Aesthetics: A case Study' (Literary Theory & Criticism)
- 2003- Rhapsody (Anthology of poems in English)
- 1999- A Cascade (Anthology of poems in English)

== Sources ==
- outlookindia.com
- thenewsminute.com
- thehindu.com
- indiatoday.in
- archive.indianexpress.com
- booksamillion.com
- deccanchronicle.com
- marunadanmalayali.com
- penguin.co.in
