= Karam Batth =

Indian-Canadian actor and producer

- Born: Patiala, India
- Occupation: Actor
- Website: www.karambatth.com

Karam Batth is an Indian-Canadian Punjabi actor and producer.

Batth will make his acting debut with self-produced biopic of the Indian boxer Kaur Singh, playing the lead role as Kaur Singh, in the film Padma Shri Kaur Singh. The film is expected to release in 2022.

Batth decided to produce this film after Indian actor Shah Rukh Khan came forward to help the boxer during a medical emergency.
