= Muttrupulliyaa =

- Directed by: Sherine Xavier
- Screenplay by: Sheirne Xavier
- Produced by: The Social Architects
- Starring: Annapoorani, Harris Moosa, Shambhavi Madhan, Iffat Fatima, Ajith, Shalini, Afreen Kabir
- Cinematography: Ravivarman Neelamegam
- Edited by: B. Lenin
- Music by: Suren Vikhash, Raanaa Kanthasamy
- Production company: The Social Architects
- Release date: 2009
- Running time: 106 minutes
- Country: Sri Lanka
- Languages: Tamil; English; Sinhala
- Budget: US$ 250,000

Muttrupulliyaa is a Sri Lankan film about four individuals of Tamil descent living in Sri Lanka after the end of the Sri Lankan Civil War in 2009. This is the first film from Sri Lanka to describe this period.

The story of Muttrupulliyaa is told through a former female Tamil tiger rebel living in Jaffna with her three children and her husband missing after he surrendered to the Sri Lankan army, a historian living in the Vanni; an environmental activist from Colombo and a young journalist from Chennai who travels to Sri Lanka.

The production team had to shoot undercover in Sri Lanka, hiding their real identities because of the risks. Despite these precautions, some of the film team were arrested or forced into hiding.

Muttrupulliyaa premiered at the Jaffna film festival.

== Censorship ==
Muttrupulliyaa was allowed to be screened in Sri Lanka and was approved by the Public Performance Board of Sri Lanka.

Muttrupulliyaa was banned in India by the censor board as it would damage Indo-Sri Lanka relations. The ban was later lifted by the Film Certification Appellate Tribunal. However, the filmmaker had to morph the Liberation Tigers of Tamil Eelam flags, cut out photographs of its slain leaders and state that the film was a work of fiction inspired by real events.
