= Joymoti Konwari =

Indian princess

- জয়মতী কুঁৱৰী
- Pronunciation: [zɔjmɔti kũɔɹi]
- Born: Mid 17th-century, Madurigaon, Sivasagar, Assam
- Died: Jerenga Pathar, Sivasagar
- Spouse: Gadadhar Singha
- Children: Lai; Lechai
- Parent(s): Laithepena Borgohain and Chandradaru

Joymoti Konwari (Note: জয়মতী কুঁৱৰী, Joymoti Kũwori, Assamese pronunciation: [zɔjmɔti kũɔɹi].) (জয়মতী কুঁৱৰী, Joymoti Kũwori, pronounced [zɔjmɔti kũɔɹi]) was the wife of Ahom prince Gadapani (later Supatphaa). She died at the hands of the royalists under Sulikphaa Loraa Roja without disclosing her exiled husband Gadapani's whereabouts in the Naga Hills, thereby enabling her husband to rise in revolt and assume kingship.

== Biography ==
Joymoti was born in the middle of the 17th-century in Maduri to Laithepena Borgohain and Chandradaru. She was married to Langi Gadapani Konwar, later an Ahom king, Supatphaa, who established the Tungkhungia line of kings.

A few buranjis mention her as Gadapani's wife though not by name. Most of what is known about her life is obtained from the ballads and folklore popular among the people of Upper Assam.

== Legacy ==
The 1935 film Joymoti, based on Joymoti Konwari's story, was the first film in the Assamese language.

== Memorials and monuments ==
=== Joysagar Tank ===
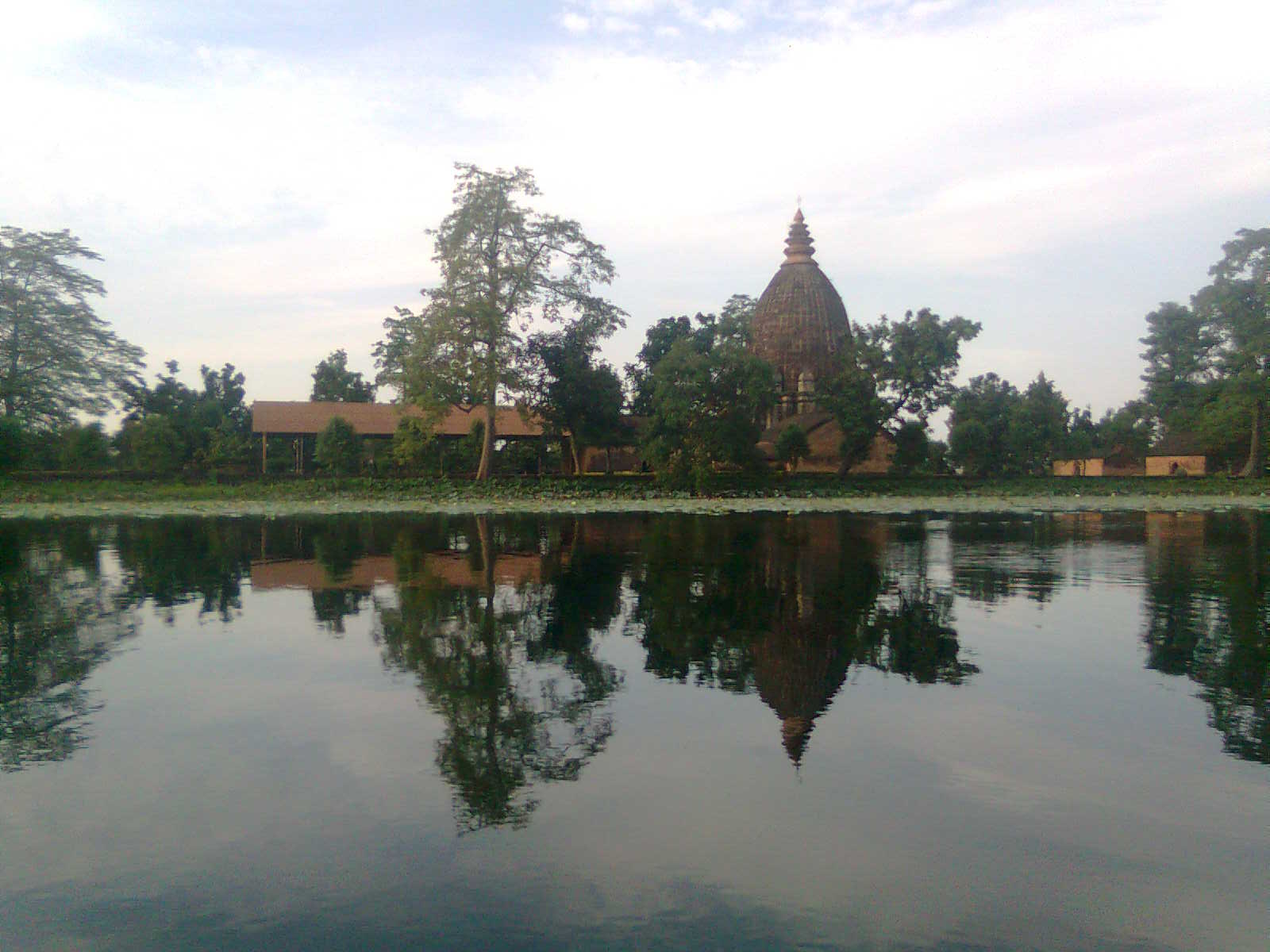
Joysagar tank built by Rudra Singha

Joymoti and Gadadhar Singha's eldest son Rudra Singha (Sukhrungphaa, 1696–1714) succeeded his father. In memory of his mother, Rudra Singha built the Joysagar Tank in 1697 at Sibsagar. It is believed to be the biggest man-made lake in India, comprising an area covering 318 acres (1.29 km^{2}) of land, including its four banks, out of which 155 acres (0.63 km^{2}) is filled with fresh water. A 2 km-long earthen water pipeline once ran from the tank to the Rangpur Palace (Kareng Ghar), supplying water to the palace.

=== Phakuwa Doul ===
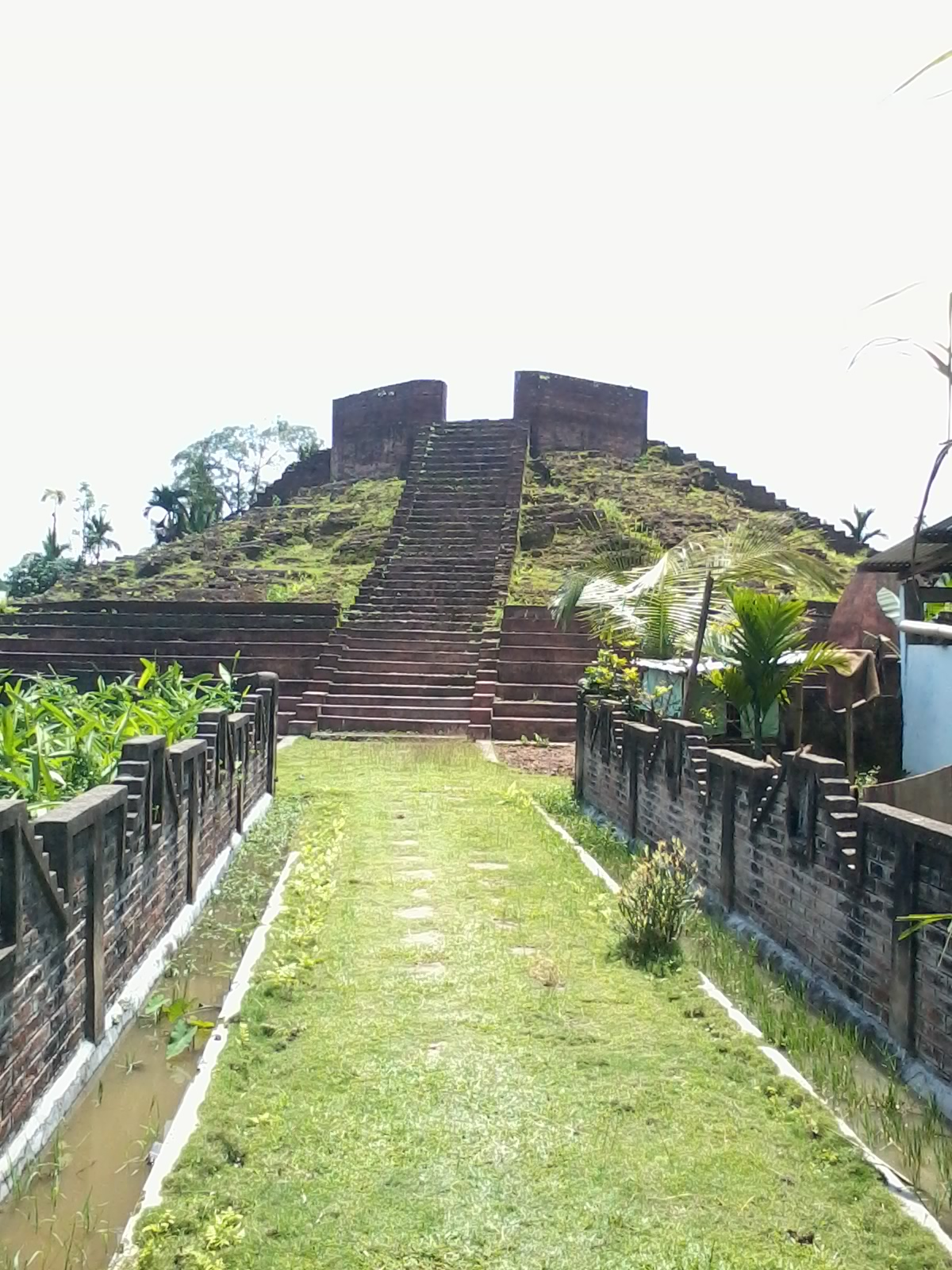
Fakuwa Doul built by Rudra Singha in 1704

Rudra Singha also built the Phakuwa Doul in 1703–04, a pyramid-shaped temple constructed before the Rangnath (Shiva) Temple on the banks of the Joysagar Tank. It is said that Rudra Singha, once again to perpetuate the memory of his mother Joymoti, constructed the temple and placed a golden idol of her within it. The circumference of the Doul was about 90 ft (27 m), and its height from base to top was 30 ft (9.1 m). There were eight brick pillars around the temple.

=== Joymoti Day ===
Sati Joymoti Divas, commemoration day of Joymoti, is held annually in Assam on 27 March.

=== Sati Joymoti Award ===
The State Government of Assam has instituted an annual award in the name of Joymoti, presented to women in recognition of excellence in their chosen fields of work.

== Film and theatre ==
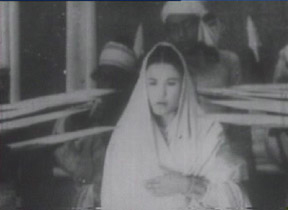
Screenshot from Joymoti (actress Aideu Handique as Joymoti)

Joymoti (1935 film) was the first Assamese language film, directed and produced by Jyoti Prasad Agarwala. In 2006, Manju Borah released another film by the same name. The 19th-century Assamese writer Lakshminath Bezbaruah depicted her life in the drama Joymoti Kuwori.

== See also ==
- Sati Sadhani
- Ahom Dynasty
