= Runumi =

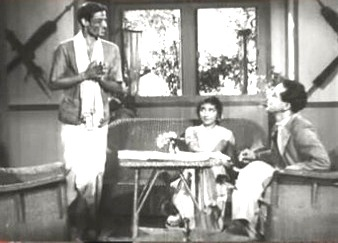
- A scene of 1952 Assamese film 'Runumi' directed by Suresh Goswami
- Directed by: Suresh Chandra Goswami
- Written by: Suresh Chandra Goswami
- Produced by: Suresh Chandra Goswami
- Starring: Kanaklata Saikia; Neyimuddin Ahmed; Suresh Goswami; Indreshwar Barthakur; Hironmoyee Devi
- Cinematography: Nalin Duarah
- Music by: Darpa Nath Sarmah
- Release date: 1952
- Country: India
- Language: Assamese

Runumi is the ninth Assamese language film. It was directed and produced by Suresh Chandra Goswami and released in 1952. The film is based on Henrik Ibsen’s play The Warriors at Helgeland. It is the second Assamese film to have been shot in location and open floor after Joymoti. The film stars Kanaklata Saikia, Neyimuddin Ahmed, Suresh Goswami, Indreshwar Barthakur, Hironmoyee Devi. The film was set in Assam and Nagaland (then the Naga hills of Assam).

== Banned in 1952 ==
Although the film was running in good response, the then government of Assam headed by chief minister Bishnuram Medhi suddenly banned due to some unknown reason that left Goswami completely bankrupt. The government did not offer any reason for the ban.

== Retrieving the film ==
After the ban, Goswami’s brother-in-law Lakshminath Borthakur took it for some "illegal" viewing in some tea gardens and since that time it was lying in a tin trunk box in Borthakur's residence. After four decades, Borthakur's son Amiya Borthakur returned it to Guwahati-based Dolly Borpujari, daughter of Mr Goswami. The 13 reels are still in original cans.

== Present condition of the film ==
Preliminary examination indicates that a significant part of the film could still be intact. But the actual condition of the print will be known only after it is checked by experts for due to the high-humidity conditions of the region the cans have caught rust and a few of them even have developed cracks, because of which some of the contents might have got damaged.

== Restoring the film ==
Utpal Borpujari, Goswami's grandson and a noted film critic, is already in touch with relevant people in Mumbai for the cleaning of the print and transferring it to other formats. The National Film Archive of India in Pune is expected to restore and preserve the film.

== Appeal ==
The late Goswami's family has appealed to the Government of Assam to let the people know why the film was banned, and also come forward to help restore and preserve the film. It also appeal to anyone directly or indirectly involved in making of the film or related to any material of the film or had seen the film to send or share those materials and memories.

== See also ==
- Jollywood
