= Aideu Handique =

Indian actress

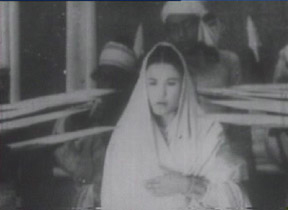
- Aideu Handique in Joymoti
- Born: 27 June 1915; Betioni Handique Gaon, Golaghat, Assam, British India
- Died: 17 December 2002 (aged 87); Kamargaon, Golaghat

Aideu Nilambar Handique (1915 – 17 December 2002) was the first film actress of Assamese cinema. She starred in the film Joymoti (1935) directed by Jyoti Prasad Agarwala.

== Personal life ==
Aideu Handique was born on 1915 in Betioni Handique Gaon, Golaghat, Assam to Nilambar Handique and Malakhi Handique in an Assamese family. She remained unmarried because she referred to the co-actor assuming the role of her character's husband as Bongohordeo (Assamese for husband) in the film. Unfortunately, the general public perceived Handique as having violated a cultural taboo and she was, consequently, shunned by neighbors and would sink into solitude and obscurity.

== Recognition ==
She never acted after Joymoti again except for a minuscule role in the film Ganga Siloni and a guest appearance in a film made on her life. In 1985, when Assam celebrated the golden jubilee of the state's cinema, her role was acknowledged. The East Indian Motion Picture Association had gifted Aideu a wheelchair. The Assam Government, much later, gave her Rs.1,500 a month as pension. It also recommended her name for Padmashri, but was denied the award because she had done only one film. In 1991, a girls' school was named after her in her village.

An Assamese film Aideu (Behind the Screen) was made on Aideu Handique tragic life and times of the first Assamese film actress by Arup Manna which was released in Mumbai International Film Festival on 8 February 2007.
