= Jyoti Prasad Agarwala =

India writer and filmmaker (1903–1951)

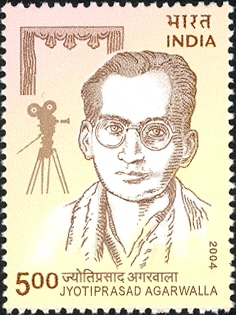
- Agarwala on a 2004 stamp of India
- Born: 17 June 1903; Tamulbari Tea Estate, Dibrugarh district, Assam, India
- Died: 17 January 1951 (aged 47); Tezpur, Darrang, Assam
- Other name: Rupkonwar
- Occupations: Lyricist; music composer; poet; dramatist; writer; filmmaker; film director; film producer; independence activist
- Years active: 1932–1951
- Spouse: Devajani Bhuyan
- Children: 7

Jyoti Prasad Agarwala (17 June 1903 – 17 January 1951) was a noted Indian playwright, songwriter, poet, writer and film maker from Assam. He was deeply revered for his creative vision and output and is popularly called the Rupkonwar of Assamese culture. In fact, he is regarded as the founder of Assamese cinema for Joymoti (1935). He was also active as freedom fighter and involved in India's independence movement Quit India Movement. His death day anniversary (17 January) is observed as Silpi divas (Artists' Day) his honour.

== Biography ==
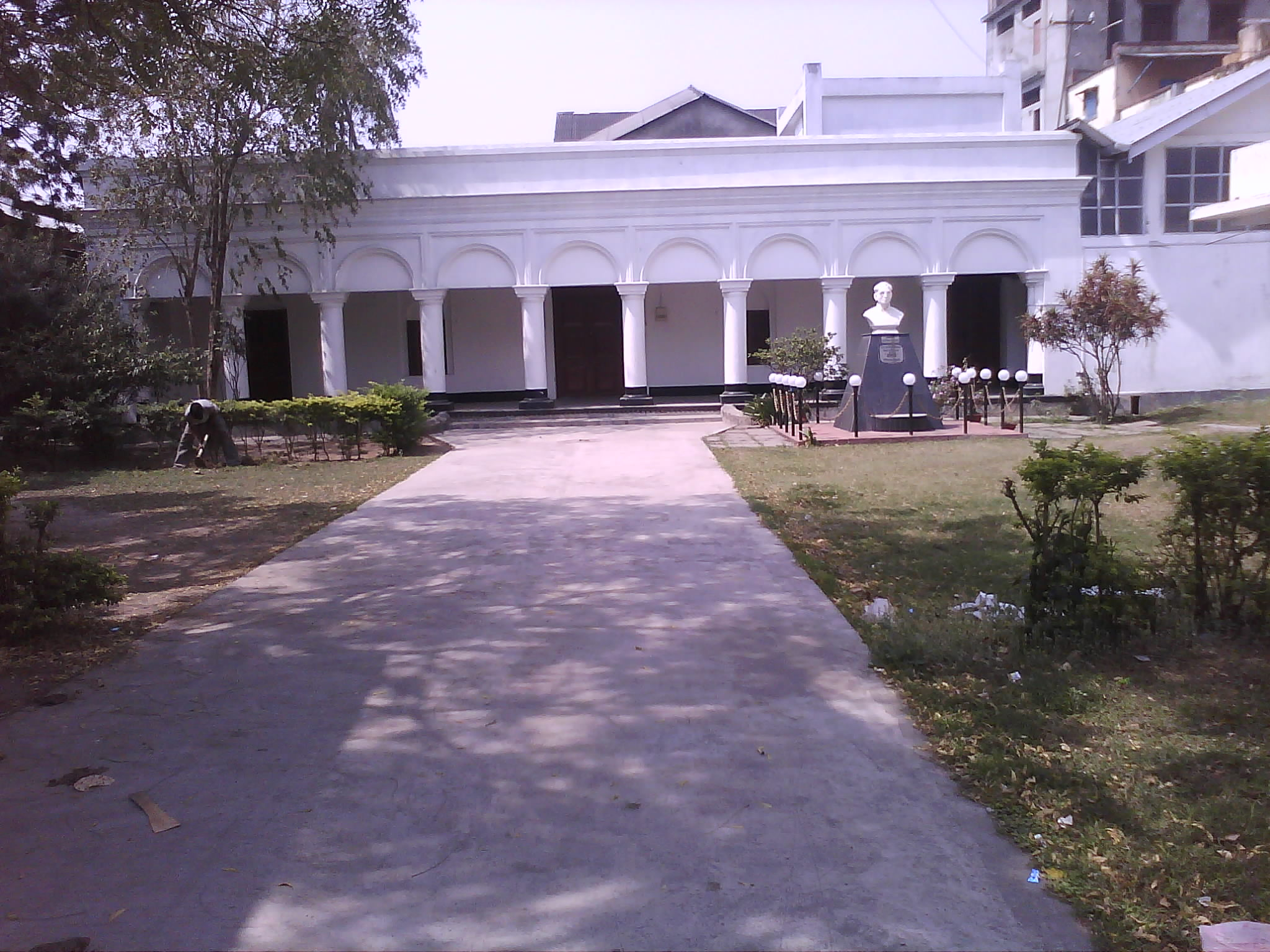
Poki or Jyoti Bharati, residence of Jyoti Prasad Agarwala at Tezpur

Jyoti Prasad Agarwala was born on 17 June 1903 to an Agrawal family, to Paramananda Agarwala(1869–1934) and Kiranmoyee Devi(Died in 1933) at Tamulbari Tea Estate. His uncles were renowned poets Chandra Kumar Agarwala and Ananda Chandra Agarwala. His forefather, Nabrangram Agarwala(1811–1865), had come to Assam in 1811 from the Marwar region in Rajasthan. After completing his studies in various schools in Assam and Calcutta, he matriculated in 1921. He went to Edinburgh in 1926 to study economics, but returned in 1930 before completing his course. On his way back, he spent seven months at the UFA studio in Germany learning film-making.

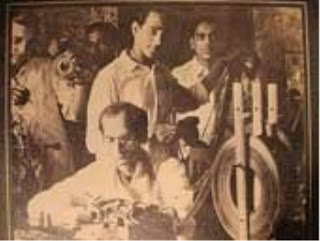
Agarwala putting the finishing touches to the editing of Joymoti

After his return to Assam, he continued his activities for Indian independence that had disrupted his studies earlier and in 1932 he was imprisoned for fifteen months. He established the Chitraban Studio at the Bholaguri Tea Estate and began filming the movie Joymoti around the end of 1933. This was the first film from Assam.

The film, released in 1935, was based on a play by Laxminath Bezbarua about the heroic Ahom princess Sati Joymoti imprisoned and tortured by a repressive Ahom swargadeo. In 1936 he married Devajani Bhuyan. In 1941 he participated in the freedom movement, and in 1942, he went underground to escape British repression. Toward the end of his life he moved from a romantic to a more radical vision, which was reflected in his works.

He died of cancer on 17 January 1951 at his residence Poki in Tezpur, Assam, India.

== Works ==
Short Stories

- Rupohi (ৰূপহী)
- Bogitora (বগীতৰা)
- Xontora (সোণতৰা)
- Xuntir Abhimaan (সোণটিৰ অভিমান)
- Zuzaru (যুঁজাৰু)
- Xotir Xuworoni (সতীৰ সোঁৱৰণী)
- Xondhya (সন্ধ্যা)
- Pratnatattikar Kalaaghumati (প্ৰত্নতাত্ত্বিকৰ কলাঘুমটি)
- Neela Charai (নীলা চৰাই)

and more.

=== Novel ===
Amar Gaon(আমাৰ গাঁও)

=== Other books ===
- Jyotidhara(জ্যোতিধৰা)
- Chandrakumar Agarwala(চন্দ্ৰ কুমাৰ আগৰৱালা)
- Background of Assamese Architecture(অসমীয়া শিল্পকলাৰ ইতিহাস)

=== Children literature ===
He wrote about thirteen children's poems, among which Kumpur Xopon(কুম্পুৰ সপোন) is noteworthy.

=== Songs ===
Jyoti Prasad Agarwala had written around 300+ songs, many of which he had set to music himself. Collectively, these songs are called Jyoti xongit(জ্যোতি সংগীত).

=== Plays ===
- Sonit Kunwori(শোণিত কুঁৱৰী) (1925)
- Karengar Ligiri(কাৰেঙৰ লিগিৰী) (1930)
- Rupalim(ৰূপালীম) (1938)
- Nimati Konya(নিমাতী কইনা) (1964)
- Xonpokhilee(সোণপখিলী)
- Khanikar(খনিকৰ) (1977)
- Lobhita(লভিতা) (1945)

=== Incomplete plays ===
- Kanaklata(কনকলতা)
- Sundarknowar(সুন্দৰ কোঁৱৰ)
- Sonpakhilee(সোণপখিলী)

=== Film ===
Agarwala is lauded as the creator of Assamese cinema. In a period that saw the beginning of Indian Cinema, with.

- Joymoti(জয়মতী) (1935)
- Indramalati(ইন্দ্ৰমালতী) (1939)

=== Poems ===
- Jyoti Raamaayon(জ্যোতি ৰামায়ণ) – Poetry Collection
- Luitor Paaror Agnixur(লুইতৰ পাৰৰ অগ্নিসুৰ) – Poetry Collection, 1971

== Stamp ==
In honour of Agarwala's contributions to Assamese literature and film, the Government of Assam issued a commemorative stamp of "Agarwala" in 2004. It was pushed for by the AGP and approved by the Prime Minister of India in mid-2004.

== See also ==
- List of Indian poets
- Assamese literature
- History of Assamese literature
- List of Assamese-language poets
- Jyoti Chitraban Film and Television Institute
- List of Assamese writers with their pen names
