= Joymoti (1935 film) =

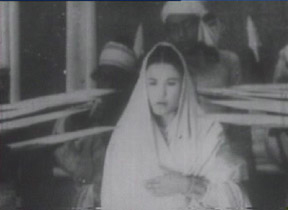
- A screenshot of the film (actress Aideu Handique as Joymoti)
- Directed by: Jyoti Prasad Agarwala
- Written by: Lakshminath Bezbarua (play)
- Produced by: Jyoti Prasad Agarwala
- Starring: Aideu Handique; Phanu Barua
- Cinematography: Bhopal Shankar Mehta
- Music by: Jyoti Prasad Agarwala
- Distributed by: Chitralekha Movietone
- Release date: 10 March 1935
- Country: India
- Language: Assamese

Joymoti is a 1935 Indian film widely considered to be the first Assamese film ever made. Based on Lakshminath Bezbaroa's play about the 17th-century Ahom princess Joymoti Konwari, the film was produced and directed by the noted Assamese poet, author, and film-maker Jyoti Prasad Agarwala, and starred Aideu Handique and acclaimed stage actor and playwright Phani Sarma. The film, shot between 1933 and 1935, was released by Chitralekha Movietone on 10 March 1935 and marked the beginning of Assamese cinema.

Joymoti was screened at the 50th International Conference of the Society For Cinema and Media Studies (SCMC) of Northwestern University in Evanston, Illinois, United States in March 2011.

Other screenings include:

- India-Bangladesh Joint Celebration of 100 Years of Indian Cinema, Dhaka (2012)
- UCLA's Centre for India and South Asia Studies, Los Angeles (April 2010)
- Osian-Cinefan's 10th Film Festival of Asian and Arabic Cinema, New Delhi (2008)
- Filmbüro Baden Württemberg's Internationales Indisches Filmfestival, Stuttgart (2006)
- Asiaticafilmidale (Encounters with Asian Cinema), Rome (2006)
- Munich Film Festival (2006).

Although never a commercial success, Joymoti was noted for its political views and the use of a female protagonist, something almost unheard of in Indian cinema of the time.

The film was the first Indian talkie to have used Dubbing and Re-recording Technology, and the first to engage with "realism" and politics in Indian cinema. The original print containing entire length of the film was thought to be lost after India's division in 1947. However, in 1995, documentary film director Arnab Jan Deka managed to recover entire footage of the lost film at a Studio in Bombay in intact condition, and reported back the matter to Assam Government apart from writing about this recovery in Assamese daily Dainik Asam and English daily The Assam Express. Meanwhile, some reels of another remaining print of the film maintained by Hridayananda Agarwala has been restored in part by Altaf Mazid.

== Plot summary ==
Set in 17th century Assam, the film recounts the sacrifice of Joymoti, an Ahom princess who was tortured and killed by the Ahom king Borphukan for refusing to tell the whereabouts of her husband, Prince Gadapani. The event is interpreted in contemporary patriotic terms, calling for greater harmony between the people of the hills and those of the plains. The hills are represented by the leader Dalimi, a Naga tribal woman who shelters the fugitive prince Gadapani.

== Background ==
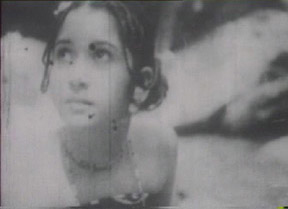
Screenshot from Joymoti (actress Swargajyoti Barooah as Dalimi)

On his way back from England, Jyoti Prasad Agarwala spent about six months at the UFA Studios in Berlin, learning film-making. Once back in Assam, he decided to make his first film. He established Chitraban Studios at the Bholaguri Tea Estate. Two camps were established: one near the Manager's Bungalow for the female artists, and the other near the tea factory for the male artists. Tea was manufactured by day, and by night actors performed at their rehearsals. Members of the cast were encouraged to keep up their physical exercises to stay fit.

A special property room was constructed, in which Jyoti Prasad Agarwala collected traditional costumes, ornaments, props, hats, etc. This grew into a museum. Technicians were brought in from Lahore; ice, transported from Calcutta.

The film was taken to Lahore for editing, at which stage Agarwala discovered there was no sound for one half of the film. Unable to marshal the actors once again from their native places due to various constraints, he hired a sound studio and dubbed the voices of all male and female characters. On a single day, he recorded six thousand feet of film. This unplanned accomplishment made Jyotiprasad Agarwala the first Indian filmmaker to have introduced Dubbing and Re-recording Technology in Talkies.

=== Plot background ===
Joymoti was the wife of the Ahom prince Gadapani. During the Purge of the Princes from 1679 to 1681 under King Sulikphaa (Loraa Roja), instigated by Laluksola Borphukan, Gadapani took flight. Over the next few years, he sought shelter at Sattras (Vaishnav monasteries) and the adjoining hills outside the Ahom kingdom. Failing to trace Prince Gadapani, Sulikphaa's soldiers brought his wife Joymoti to Jerenga Pathar where, despite brutal and inhuman torture, the princess refused to reveal the whereabouts of her husband. After continuous physical torture over 14 days, Joymoti died on 13 Choit of 1601 Saka, or 27 March 1680.

Joymoti's sacrifice would bear fruit in time: Laluk was murdered in November 1680 by a disgruntled body of household retainers. The ministers, now roused to a sense of patriotism, sent out search parties for Gadapani who, gathering his strength, returned from his exile in the Garo Hills to oust Sulikphaa from the throne. Joymoti had known that only her husband was capable of ending Sulikphaa-Laluk's reign of terror. For her love and her supreme sacrifice for husband and country, folk accounts refer to her as a Soti.

== Overview ==

Joymoti, a study of the culture and history of Assam, carried with it the bright possibility of a film tradition. The significant similarities with the Russian montage reflect an element of influence. The film is noted for its constantly changing angles, unique sets (built from scratch on a tea plantation, with local materials), and other stylistics tactics employed by the imaginative Jyoti Prasad in this his film debut. By then a published poet and writer, his lyricism is clearly evident in this pioneering film.

== Technical aspects ==
The film was shot on a 4267.20 m-length film.

== Filming ==
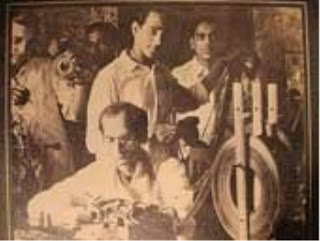
Joymati during production

According to Natasurya Phani Sarma, who played a key role in the film, Chitraban was not merely a studio, but a film-training institute in itself. Apart from the acting, Jyoti Prasad also taught his actors certain film-making techniques—such as developing, processing, printing, and editing—and shared with them his knowledge of various film shots like mixed shot, fade out, zoom, dissolve, back projection, and model shooting. The 17th-century costumes used in the film were designed by Jyoti Prasad.

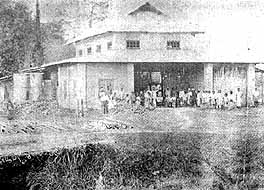
The first ever Assamese film studio at the Bholaguri Tea Estate

Although shooting at the Chitraban Studio started in April 1933, it faced an initial delay as Jyoti Prasad was unable to find a suitable young woman to play "Joymoti", as well as actors for a few other roles. This was inspired by Jyoti Prasad's desire to liberate cinema from that "uncertain" reputation. After a prolonged search and detailed interviews, he discovered Aideu Handique in a remote village near Golaghat, for the role of Joymoti: she was to become the first actress of Assamese cinema. He then brought together the other chosen actors, of whom some had never seen a film, to acquaint them with his characters.

During filming, the rainy season was to prove a challenge to developments in the technical process, with Jyoti Prasad having to suspend shooting for several days at a time, due to insufficient light in the absence of outdoor electricity. Shooting was carried out under sunlight by using reflectors. Filming was eventually completed in August 1934, and Joymoti released in early 1935 after Jyoti Prasad had completed his own editing.

== Cast ==
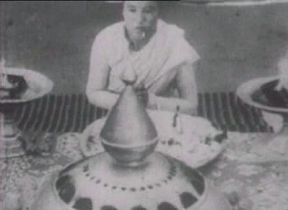
A screenshot of Joymoti

- Phanu Barua
- Aideu Handique
- Mohini Rajkumari
- Swargajyoti Datta Barooah
- Manabhiram Barua
- Phani Sarma
- Sneha Chandra Barua
- Naren Bardoloi
- Rana Barua
- Shamshul Haque
- Rajen Baruah
- Putal Haque
- Pratap Barua
- Rajkumari Gohain
- Subarnarekha Saikia (as Kheuti)
- Lalit Mohan Choudhury
- Banamali Das
- Prafulla Chandra Barua
- Kamala Prasad Agarwala
- Subha Barowa (in the role of spy)

== Film rediscovered ==
Following the Second World War Joymoti was lost and almost forgotten. In the early 1970s, Jyoti Prasad's youngest brother, Hridayananda Agarwala, found seven reels of the lone print of Joymoti while cleaning junk out of his garage. Jyoti Prasad's venture, with its considerable losses, had cost the family plantation dearly, placing his family in acute difficulties. The condition of the reels, by the early 1970s, was abysmal, but his brother Hridayananda commissioned the well-known Assamese director Bhupen Hazarika to direct the long 1976 documentary Rupkonwar Jyotiprasad aru Joymoti, in which the reels were incorporated. The documentary thereby saved the reels, which have been copied and remastered since.

Then, in 1995, popular Assamese story-writer, novelist, engineer, actor, screenwriter and documentary film director Arnab Jan Deka, recovered the original intact print of the film, containing the entire footage, at a Studio in Bombay. This original print of Joymoti was thought to be lost after India's division in 1947, as it was left behind in a studio in Lahore, now in Pakistan. Somehow the print, together with other films, travelled from Lahore and resurfaced in India's film capital.

After making this great recovery, Arnab Jan Deka reported the matter to the Assam Government, and wrote about this recovery in the Assamese daily Dainik Asam and the English daily The Assam Express. Other leading English and Hindi newspapers, like The North East Times, The News Star, and Purvanchal Prahari, published extensive reports about Arnab Jan Deka's phenomenal discovery. This film's director Jyotiprasad Agarwala's younger brother, Hridayananda Agarwala, and the famous Assamese actor-playwright, Satya Prasad Barua, also confirmed and publicly acknowledged Arnab Jan Deka's great recovery through two separate articles in the Dainik Asam and the highly circulated English daily The Assam Tribune in 1996. This matter was also debated at Assam Legislative Assembly, and Secretary, Cultural Affairs Department of Assam Government, convened an official meet to discuss this matter together with other issues pertaining to development of Assamese films.

In 2011 Arnab Jan Deka again wrote in detail about this entire episode in the prestigious Assamese literary journal Prantik.

== The fate of Chitraban ==
Situated about 10 km west of Gohpur, Jyoti Prasad's temporary film studio ‘Chitraban’, at Bholaguri Tea Estate, today stands deserted, a nostalgic nod to its glorious past. Once owned by Jyoti Prasad, the tea plantation passed on to the Assam Tea Corporation in 1978. The garden, where Jyoti Prasad single-handedly laid the foundation stone of Assamese cinema, now lies abandoned. The bungalow, where he composed the music for Joymoti on his organ, still stands - albeit in a dilapidated condition.

== See also ==
- Indramalati (1939)
