= National Film Award for Best Non-Feature Environment/Conservation/Preservation Film =

Indian film award

- National award for contributions to short film
- Sponsored by: Directorate of Film Festivals
- Rewards: Rajat Kamal (Silver Lotus); ₹50,000
- First award: 1989
- Final award: 2021
- Most recent winner: Munnam Valavu

Highlights
- Total awarded: 32
- First winner: The Deer on the Lake

The National Film Award for Best Non-Feature Environment/Conservation/Preservation Film was one of the National Film Awards presented annually by the Directorate of Film Festivals, the organization set up by Ministry of Information and Broadcasting, India. It was one of several awards presented for non-feature films and awarded with Rajat Kamal (Silver Lotus).

The award was instituted in 1989, at 37th National Film Awards and awarded annually for films produced in the year across the country, in all Indian languages. At the 70th National Film Awards, the award is discontinued and clubbed with National Film Award for Best Promotional Film, National Film Award for Best Scientific Film, National Film Award for Best Educational/Motivational/Instructional Film, National Film Award for Best Exploration/Adventure Film, National Film Award for Best Anthropological/Ethnographic Film, National Film Award for Best Investigative Film and National Film Award for Best Film on Social Issues, National Film Award for Best Agriculture Film and two new categories were created; Best Documentary and Best Non Feature Film Promoting Social and Environmental Values.

== Winners ==
Award includes 'Rajat Kamal' (Silver Lotus) and cash prize. Following are the award winners over the years:

Awards legends
†	Awarded as Best Scientific Film / Best Environment / Conservation / Preservation Film
‡	Awarded as Best Agricultural Film / Best Environment / Conservation / Preservation Film

List of films, showing the year, language(s), producer(s) and director(s)
Year	Film(s)	Language(s)	Producer(s)	Director(s)	Refs.
1989 (37th)	The Deer on the Lake	English	Aribam Syam Sharma	Aribam Syam Sharma	
1990 (38th)	Pratikriya	Desiya	Rahat Yusufi	Rahat Yusufi	
1991 (39th)	Mudialy Ekti Bikalpa Pantha (The Mudialy Alternative)	English	Dilip Kumar Roy	Samiran Dutta	
1992 (40th)	Ladhakh: The Forbidden Wilderness	English	Bedi Films	Naresh Bedi	
1993 (41st)	Orchids of Manipur	Manipuri	Sh. Tomchou Singh	Aribam Syam Sharma	
1994 (42nd)	Visuddha Vanangal	Malayalam	Kerala State Film Development Corporation	K. R. Mohanan	
1995 (43rd)	Amrit Beeja	• English • Kannada	Meera Dewan	Meera Dewan	
1996 (44th)	Rabia Chalikkunnu	Malayalam	Abraham Benhur	Ali Akbar	
1997 (45th)	Nature's Sentinels: Bishnoi	Hindi	Y. N. Engineer for Films Division	• Late P. C. Sharma • Shankar Patnaik	
1998 (46th)	Willing To Sacrifice	English	Dayakar Rao	B. V. Rao	
1999 (47th)	And The Bamboo Blooms	English	Films Division	Joshy Joseph	
2000 (48th)	The Nest	Bengali	Sparsh Productions	Supriyo Sen	
2001 (49th)	The Holy Ganga	Hindi	Y. N. Engineer for Films Division	Viplove Bhatia	
2002 (50th)	Urumattram	Tamil	• B.Sivakumar • G. Meenakshi Sundaram	B.Sivakumar	
2003 (51st)	The 18 Elephant: Three Monologues†	Malayalam	Savithri Divakaran	P. Balan	
2004 (52nd)	Timeless Traveller-The Horseshoe Crab†	English	Riverbank Studios	Gautam Pandey	
2005 (53rd)	Under This Sun†	Bengali	Nilanjan Bhattacharya	Nilanjan Bhattacharya	
2006 (54th)	Kalpavriksha: Legacy Of Forests†	English	Mike Pandey	Nina Subramani	
2007 (55th)	Bhanga Ghara	Bengali	FTII	Nilanjan Datta	
2008 (56th)	No Award				
2009 (57th)	In For Motion‡	English	Amlan Dutta	Anirban Dutta	
2010 (58th)	Iron is Hot	English	Meghnath Bhattacharjee	• Biju Toppo • Meghnath Bhattacharjee	
2011 (59th)	Tiger Dynasty	English	S. Nallamuthu	S. Nallamuthu	
2012 (60th)	Timbaktu‡	English	Public Service Broadcasting Trust	• Rintu Thomas • Sushmit Ghosh	
2013 (61st)	Foresting Life‡	• Hindi • Assamese	Humanity Watchdog Foundation	Aarti Shrivastava	
2014 (62nd)	I Cannot Give You My Forest‡	English	Top Quark Films Pvt. Ltd.	• Nandan Saxena • Kavita Bahl	
2015 (63rd)	The Man Who Dwarfed The Mountains‡	English	• Rajiv Mehrotra • PSBT	• Ruchi Shrivastava • Sumit Sunderlal Khanna	
2015 (63rd)	God On The Edge‡	• Hindi • English	Elements Picture Studio	Ashok Patel	
2016 (64th)	The Tiger Who Crossed The Line‡	English	Krishnendu Bose	Krishnendu Bose	
2017 (65th)	The Pangti Story‡	Naga	Rajiv Mehrotra	Sesino Yhoshü	
2018 (66th)	The World's Most Famous Tiger		Natural History Unit India	S. Nallamuthu	
2019 (67th)	The Stork Saviours	Hindi	• Rajiv Mehrotra • PSBT	• Ajay Bedi • Vijay Bedi	
2020 (68th)	Manah Aru Manuh (Manas and People)	Assamese	Directorate, Manas National Park and Aaranyak	Dip Bhuyan	
2021 (69th)	Munnam Valavu‡	Malayalam	Sree Gokulam Movies	R S Pradeep	
