= National Film Award for Best Agriculture Film =

Indian film award

- National award for contributions to short film
- Sponsored by: Directorate of Film Festivals
- Rewards: Rajat Kamal (Silver Lotus); ₹50,000
- First award: 1984
- Final award: 2021
- Most recent winner: Munnam Valavu

Highlights
- Total awarded: 26
- First winner: Krishi Jantrapati

The National Film Award for Best Agriculture Film was one of the National Film Awards presented annually by the Directorate of Film Festivals, the organisation set up by Ministry of Information and Broadcasting, India. It was one of several awards presented for non-feature films.

The award was instituted in 1984, at 32nd National Film Awards and awarded annually for non-feature films produced in the year across the country, in all Indian languages. At the 70th National Film Awards, the award is discontinued and clubbed with National Film Award for Best Promotional Film, National Film Award for Best Scientific Film, National Film Award for Best Educational/Motivational/Instructional Film, National Film Award for Best Exploration/Adventure Film, National Film Award for Best Anthropological/Ethnographic Film, National Film Award for Best Investigative Film, National Film Award for Best Film on Social Issues and National Film Award for Best Non-Feature Environment/Conservation/Preservation Film, and two new categories were created; Best Documentary and Best Non Feature Film Promoting Social and Environmental Values.

== Awards ==
Award includes 'Rajat Kamal' (Silver Lotus Award) and cash prize. Following are the award winners over the years:

Awards legends
†	Awarded as Best Environment Film Including Agriculture

List of award films, showing the year (award ceremony), language(s), producer(s) and director(s)
Year	Film(s)	Language(s)	Producer(s)	Director(s)	Refs.
1984 (32nd)	Krishi Jantrapati	Hindi	Ghanashyam Mahapatra	Ghanashyam Mahapatra	
1985 (33rd)	Cash in Cashew Cultivation	English	K. K. Garg	D. Gautaman	
1986 (34th)	Three Spices: Cinnamon Part I	English	D. Gautaman for Films Division	D. Gautaman	
1987 (35th)	Angora For Wool	English	D. Gautaman for Films Division	K. Jagjivan Ram	
1988 (36th)	Seeds of Hope	English	M/s Eco Media Pvt Ltd.	• Romulus Whitaker • Shekar Dattatri	
1989 (37th)	Integrated Pest Management in Cotton	English	D. Gautaman	K. Jagajivan Ram	
1990 (38th)	Golden Earth	English	BAIF Development Research Foundation	Vishram Revankar	
1991 (39th)	Malberiyum Pattunoolum	Malayalam	Kerala State Film Development Corporation	P. P. Govindan	
1992 (40th)	Ber	English	Om Prakash Sharma for Films Division	Rajgopal Rao	
1993 (41st)	Building From Below	English	N. G. Hegde	Vishram Revankar	
1994 (42nd)	No Award				
1995 (43rd)	Drip and Sprinkler Irrigation	Hindi	L. K. Upadhyaya for Films Division	A. K. Goorha for Films Division	
1996 (44th)	No Award				
1997 (45th)	Post Harvest Management of Potato	Hindi	Y. N. Engineer for Films Division	V. Packirisamy for Films Division	
1998 (46th)	No Award				
1999 (47th)	No Award				
2000 (48th)	Vermi Culture (News Magazine 424)	Hindi	Kuldip Sinha for Films Division	A. R. Sharief for Films Division	
2001 (49th)	No Award				
2002 (50th)	No Award				
2003 (51st)	Seeds of Life	English	Rajiv Mehrotra	Usha Albuquerque	
2004 (52nd)	No Award				
2005 (53rd)	Seed Keepers	• Telugu • English	Rajiv Mehrotra	Farida Pacha	
2006 (54th)	Jaivik Kheti	Hindi	• Mr. Ravindra Alias Nitin Prabhakar Bhosale • Mrs. Mrunalini Ravindra Bhosale	Mrunalini Ravindra Bhosale	
2007 (55th)	No Award				
2008 (56th)	The Land of Rupshupas	English	Films Division	A. K. Sidhpuri	
2009 (57th)	In For Motion†	English	Amlan Dutta	Anirban Dutta	
2010 (58th)	No Award				
2011 (59th)	No Award				
2012 (60th)	Timbaktu†	English	Public Service Broadcasting Trust	• Rintu Thomas • Sushmit Ghosh	
2013 (61st)	Foresting Life†	• Hindi • Assamese	Humanity Watchdog Foundation	Aarti Shrivastava	
2014 (62nd)	I Cannot Give You My Forest†	English	Top Quark Films Pvt. Ltd.	• Nandan Saxena • Kavita Bahl	
2015 (63rd)	The Man Who Dwarfed The Mountains†	English	• Rajiv Mehrotra • PSBT	• Ruchi Shrivastava • Sumit Sunderlal Khanna	
2015 (63rd)	God on the Edge†	• Hindi • English	Elements Picture Studio	Ashok Patel	
2016 (64th)	The Tiger Who Crossed The Line†	English	Krishnendu Bose	Krishnendu Bose	
2017 (65th)	The Pangti Story†		Rajiv Mehrotra	Sesino Yhoshü	
2018 (66th)	No Award				
2019 (67th)	No Award				
2020 (68th)	No Award				
2021 (69th)	Munnam Valavu†	Malayalam	Sree Gokulam Movies	R. S. Pradeep	
