= Kevipodi Sophie =

Indian politician

Kevipodi Sophie (born 1964) is an Indian politician from Nagaland. He is a four-time MLA from the Southern Angami I Assembly constituency, which is reserved for Scheduled Tribe community, in Kohima district. He won the 2023 Nagaland Legislative Assembly election, as an independent politician.

== Early life and education ==
Sophie is from Southern Angami, Kohima, Nagaland. He is the son of Zelul Sophie. He is a retired government employee. He completed his M.A. in political science in 1984 at North Eastern Hill University, Shillong. Sophie retired as Project Director of the DRDA department of Rural Development, Government of Nagaland.

== Career ==
Sophie won the Southern Angami I constituency as an independent candidate in the 2023 Nagaland assembly election. He polled 6,643 votes and defeated his nearest rival, Medo Yhokha of the Nationalist Democratic Progressive Party, by 177 votes.
