= List of film production companies in India =

Indian Film Companies

A film production company is a company that generally produces, creates and distributes motion pictures (films), musics or other programmes by their own subsidiary companies. It produces video content for television, social media, corporate promotions, commercials and other media-related fields. This is a list of notable film production houses, distributors and music studios situated or headquartered in India.

== Active film houses ==
Headquarter	Production name	Distributor name	Music studios
Ahmedabad	CineMan Productions	—N/a	—N/a
Bangalore	Felis Creations	—N/a	—N/a
Bangalore	Hombale Films		—N/a
Bangalore	Jayanna Combines		—N/a
Bangalore	Kanteerava Studios	—N/a	—N/a
Bangalore	—N/a	—N/a	Lahari Music
Bangalore	Paramvah Studios		—N/a
Bangalore	PRK Productions	—N/a	—N/a
Bangalore	Pushkar Films		—N/a
Bangalore	Rockline Entertainments		—N/a
Bhubaneshwar	Tarang Cine Productions	—N/a	—N/a
Chennai	2D Entertainment	—N/a	—N/a
Chennai	AGS Entertainment	—N/a	—N/a
Chennai	AVM Productions	—N/a	—N/a
Chennai	Cloud Nine Movies	—N/a	—N/a
Chennai	—N/a	Dream Factory	—N/a
Chennai	Gemini Film Circuit	—N/a	—N/a
Chennai	Kavithalayaa Productions	—N/a	—N/a
Chennai	Lyca Productions		—N/a
Chennai	Madras Talkies	—N/a	—N/a
Chennai	—N/a	—N/a	Muzik 247
Chennai	Qube Cinema Technologies	—N/a	—N/a
Chennai	Raaj Kamal Films International	—N/a	—N/a
Chennai	Red Giant Movies	—N/a	—N/a
Chennai	S Pictures	—N/a	—N/a
Chennai	—N/a	—N/a	Sony Music
Chennai	Sivaji Productions	—N/a	—N/a
Chennai	Sivakarthikeyan Productions	—N/a	—N/a
Chennai	Sun Pictures		—N/a
Chennai	Studio Green	—N/a	—N/a
Chennai	—N/a	—N/a	Tharangni
Chennai	—N/a	—N/a	Think Music
Chennai	Vijaya Productions	—N/a	—N/a
Chennai	Wunderbar Films	—N/a	—N/a
Chennai	YNOT Studios	—N/a	—N/a
Gurgaon	PVR Inox Pictures	—N/a	—N/a
Hyderabad	—N/a	—N/a	Aditya Music
Hyderabad	Annapurna Studios	—N/a	—N/a
Hyderabad	Geetha Arts	—N/a	—N/a
Hyderabad	G. Mahesh Babu Entertainment	—N/a	—N/a
Hyderabad	Konidela Production Company	—N/a	—N/a
Hyderabad	—N/a	—N/a	Madhura Audio
Hyderabad	Mythri Movie Makers	—N/a	—N/a
Hyderabad	Ramanaidu Studios	—N/a	—N/a
Hyderabad	Sri Venkateswara Cine Chitra	—N/a	—N/a
Hyderabad	Sri Venkateswara Creations		—N/a
Hyderabad	Suresh Productions		—N/a
Hyderabad	Ushakiran Movies	—N/a	—N/a
Hyderabad	Vaaraahi Chalana Chitram		—N/a
Hyderabad	Vyjayanthi Movies	—N/a	—N/a
Kochi	Aashirvad Cinemas	—N/a	—N/a
Kochi	Friday Film House	—N/a	—N/a
Kochi	Kokers Films	—N/a	—N/a
Kochi	Mammootty Kampany	—N/a	—N/a
Kochi	—N/a	—N/a	Manorama Music
Kochi	Maxlab Cinemas and Entertainments		—N/a
Kochi	Mulakuppadam Films	—N/a	—N/a
Kochi	Navodaya Studio	—N/a	—N/a
Kochi	Playhouse Motion Pictures	—N/a	—N/a
Kochi	—N/a	—N/a	Satyam Audios
Kochi	Wayfarer Films	Wayfarer Films	—N/a
Kolkata	Eskay Movies	—N/a	—N/a
Kolkata	Shree Venkatesh Films	—N/a	SVF Music
Kolkata	Surinder Films	—N/a	—N/a
Mumbai	—N/a	AA Films	—N/a
Mumbai	Anurag Kashyap Films	—N/a	—N/a
Mumbai	Balaji Motion Pictures	—N/a	Balaji Music
Mumbai	Cape of Good Films	—N/a	—N/a
Mumbai	Chalchitra Mandalee	—N/a	—N/a
Mumbai	Chilsag Entertainment Network	—N/a	—N/a
Mumbai	Clean Slate Filmz	—N/a	—N/a
Mumbai	Colour Yellow Productions	—N/a	—N/a
Mumbai	Devgn Films	—N/a	—N/a
Mumbai	Dharma Productions	—N/a	—N/a
Mumbai	Drishyam Films	—N/a	—N/a
Mumbai	Emmay Entertainment	—N/a	—N/a
Mumbai	Eros International		Eros Music
Mumbai	Excel Entertainment	—N/a	—N/a
Mumbai	Grazing Goat Pictures	—N/a	—N/a
Mumbai	Medient Studios	—N/a	—N/a
Mumbai	Mukta Arts	—N/a	—N/a
Mumbai	Nadiadwala Grandson Entertainment	—N/a	—N/a
Mumbai	Narrative Pictures	—N/a	—N/a
Mumbai	Navketan Films	—N/a	—N/a
Mumbai	NFDC Cinemas of India	—N/a	—N/a
Mumbai	Pen India Limited	—N/a	Pen India Music
Mumbai	Percept Picture Company	—N/a	—N/a
Mumbai	Phantom Films	—N/a	—N/a
Mumbai	Planet Marathi	—N/a	—N/a
Mumbai	Rajshri Productions	—N/a	—N/a
Mumbai	Red Chillies Entertainment	—N/a	—N/a
Mumbai	Reliance Entertainment	—N/a	—N/a
Mumbai	—N/a	—N/a	Saregama
Mumbai	Salman Khan Films	—N/a	—N/a
Mumbai	—N/a	—N/a	Shemaroo
Mumbai	Sikhya Entertainment	—N/a	—N/a
Mumbai	Star Studio18		—N/a
Mumbai	T-Series		
Mumbai	Trimurti Films	—N/a	—N/a
Mumbai	UTV Motion Pictures	—N/a	—N/a
Mumbai	Ultra Media & Entertainment		Ultra Music
Mumbai	Viacom18 Studios	—N/a	—N/a
Mumbai	Vinod Chopra Films	—N/a	—N/a
Mumbai	Vishesh Films	—N/a	—N/a
Mumbai	Walt Disney Pictures India	—N/a	—N/a
Mumbai	Yash Raj Films		YRF Music
Mumbai	Yoodlee Films	—N/a	—N/a
Mumbai	Zee Studios		Zee Music Company
New Delhi	Riverbank Studios	—N/a	—N/a
New Delhi	Sahara Movie Studios	—N/a	—N/a
Thiruvananthapuram	Pranavam Arts International	—N/a	—N/a
Vijayawada	PVP Cinema	—N/a	—N/a

== Closed film producing companies ==
- Bombay Talkies, closed in 1953
- R. K. Films, closed in 2019

== See also ==
- Cinema of India
