= Southern Angami I Assembly constituency =

Legislative Assembly constituency in Nagaland State, India

Coordinates: 25.56°N 94.11°E

Southern Angami I
- Constituency No. 14 for the Nagaland Legislative Assembly

Constituency details
- Country: India
- Region: Northeast India
- State: Nagaland
- District: Kohima
- Lok Sabha constituency: Nagaland
- Established: 1964
- Total electors: 14,482
- Reservation: ST

Member of Legislative Assembly
- 14th Nagaland Legislative Assembly
- Incumbent Kevipodi Sophie
- Party: Independent
- Elected year: 2023

Southern Angami I is one of the 60 Legislative Assembly constituencies of Nagaland state in India. It is part of Kohima district and is reserved for candidates belonging to the Scheduled Tribes. It is also part of Nagaland Lok Sabha constituency.

== Members of the Legislative Assembly ==
Election	Member	Party
1964	Ngurohie Zao	Independent
1969	Vitsonei Kirha	United Front of Nagaland
1974	Vitsonei Kirha	United Democratic Front
1977	Vitsonei Kirha	United Democratic Front
1982	Puse Zhotso	Independent
1987	Dietho-o Yhoshü	Independent
1989	Mavil Khieya	Indian National Congress
1993	Ruguozelhou	Nagaland People's Council
1998	Mavil Khieya	Independent
2003	Medokul Sophie	Indian National Congress
2008	Vikho-o Yhoshü	Naga People's Front
2013	Vikho-o Yhoshü	Naga People's Front
2018	Vikho-o Yhoshü	Nationalist Democratic Progressive Party
2020 (by-election)	Medo Yhokha	Nationalist Democratic Progressive Party
2023	Kevipodi Sophie	Independent

== Election results ==
=== 2023 Assembly election ===
2023 Nagaland Legislative Assembly election: Southern Angami I
Party	Candidate	Votes	%	±%
Independent	Kevipodi Sophie	6,643	50.53%	
NDPP	Medo Yhokha	6,466	49.18%	−2.02%
NOTA	Nota	38	0.29%	
Margin of victory		177	1.35%	−16.97%
Turnout		13,147	90.78%	5.91%
Registered electors		14,482		8.12%
Independent gain from NDPP		Swing	-0.68%	

=== 2018 Assembly election ===
2018 Nagaland Legislative Assembly election: Southern Angami I
Party	Candidate	Votes	%	±%
NDPP	Vikho-o Yhoshü	5,821	51.21%	
NPP	Medokul Sophie	3,739	32.89%	
NPF	Khrielezo Bio	1,366	12.02%	−56.05%
INC	Nagakul Tase	337	2.96%	−28.76%
NOTA	None of the Above	105	0.92%	
Margin of victory		2,082	18.31%	−18.03%
Turnout		11,368	84.87%	−7.36%
Registered electors		13,394		−0.04%
NDPP gain from NPF		Swing	-16.86%	

=== 2013 Assembly election ===
2013 Nagaland Legislative Assembly election: Southern Angami I
Party	Candidate	Votes	%	±%
NPF	Vikho-o Yhoshü	8,413	68.07%	10.42%
INC	Nagakul Tase	3,921	31.72%	−10.88%
Margin of victory		4,492	36.34%	21.30%
Turnout		12,360	92.24%	5.36%
Registered electors		13,400		−0.92%
NPF hold		Swing	10.42%	

=== 2008 Assembly election ===
2008 Nagaland Legislative Assembly election: Southern Angami I
Party	Candidate	Votes	%	±%
NPF	Vikho-o Yhoshü	6,774	57.65%	31.98%
INC	Medokul Sophie	5,006	42.60%	12.37%
Margin of victory		1,768	15.05%	10.48%
Turnout		11,751	87.10%	10.25%
Registered electors		13,525		10.14%
NPF gain from INC		Swing	27.41%	

=== 2003 Assembly election ===
2003 Nagaland Legislative Assembly election: Southern Angami I
Party	Candidate	Votes	%	±%
INC	Medokul Sophie	2,845	30.23%	−15.11%
NPF	Mavil Khieya	2,415	25.66%	
AITC	Khielezo	2,272	24.14%	
Independent	Nagakul Tase	1,878	19.96%	
Margin of victory		430	4.57%	−4.75%
Turnout		9,410	76.63%	−14.43%
Registered electors		12,280		6.24%
INC gain from Independent		Swing	-30.07%	

=== 1998 Assembly election ===
1998 Nagaland Legislative Assembly election: Southern Angami I
Party	Candidate	Votes	%	±%
Independent	Mavil Khieya	3,964	54.66%	
INC	K. Tase	3,288	45.34%	9.59%
Margin of victory		676	9.32%	−15.23%
Turnout		7,252	64.30%	−26.75%
Registered electors		11,559		14.99%
Independent gain from NPF		Swing	-5.64%	

=== 1993 Assembly election ===
1993 Nagaland Legislative Assembly election: Southern Angami I
Party	Candidate	Votes	%	±%
NPF	Ruguozelhou	5,448	60.30%	13.30%
INC	Mavil Khieya	3,230	35.75%	−17.25%
BJP	Siz-O-Kire	357	3.95%	
Margin of victory		2,218	24.55%	18.55%
Turnout		9,035	91.06%	1.53%
Registered electors		10,052		45.87%
NPF gain from INC		Swing	7.30%	

=== 1989 Assembly election ===
1989 Nagaland Legislative Assembly election: Southern Angami I
Party	Candidate	Votes	%	±%
INC	Mavil Khieya	3,241	53.00%	31.80%
NPF	Dietho-o Yhoshü	2,874	47.00%	
Margin of victory		367	6.00%	−9.66%
Turnout		6,115	89.52%	5.35%
Registered electors		6,891		−0.12%
INC gain from Independent		Swing	16.14%	

=== 1987 Assembly election ===
1987 Nagaland Legislative Assembly election: Southern Angami I
Party	Candidate	Votes	%	±%
Independent	Diethoo	2,123	36.86%	
INC	Puse Zhotso	1,221	21.20%	7.99%
NND	Vitsonei K. Angami	1,220	21.18%	−17.88%
NPP	V. Zao	1,196	20.76%	
Margin of victory		902	15.66%	6.98%
Turnout		5,760	84.17%	11.63%
Registered electors		6,899		1.08%
Independent hold		Swing	-10.88%	

=== 1982 Assembly election ===
1982 Nagaland Legislative Assembly election: Southern Angami I
Party	Candidate	Votes	%	±%
Independent	Puse	2,338	47.73%	
NND	Vitsonei K. Angami	1,913	39.06%	
INC	Mavil Khieya	647	13.21%	−10.95%
Margin of victory		425	8.68%	−7.93%
Turnout		4,898	72.54%	−3.19%
Registered electors		6,825		12.81%
Independent gain from UDA		Swing	5.71%	

=== 1977 Assembly election ===
1977 Nagaland Legislative Assembly election: Southern Angami I
Party	Candidate	Votes	%	±%
UDA	Vitsonei K. Angami	1,885	42.02%	−7.01%
Independent	N. Zao Angami	1,140	25.41%	
INC	Kehozhol Khieya	1,084	24.16%	
NCN	Medovillie	377	8.40%	
Margin of victory		745	16.61%	4.45%
Turnout		4,486	75.74%	2.82%
Registered electors		6,050		10.18%
UDA hold		Swing	-7.01%	

=== 1974 Assembly election ===
1974 Nagaland Legislative Assembly election: Southern Angami I
Party	Candidate	Votes	%	±%
UDA	Vitsonie	1,916	49.03%	
NNO	Kehozhol Khieya	1,441	36.87%	8.26%
Independent	Kethovi	551	14.10%	
Margin of victory		475	12.15%	−13.17%
Turnout		3,908	72.92%	−10.16%
Registered electors		5,491		52.82%
UDA gain from UDF		Swing	-4.91%	

=== 1969 Assembly election ===
1969 Nagaland Legislative Assembly election: Southern Angami I
Party	Candidate	Votes	%	±%
UDF	Vitsonie	1,610	53.94%	
NNO	Kehozhol Khieya	854	28.61%	
Independent	Kuodio Angami	521	17.45%	
Margin of victory		756	25.33%	
Turnout		2,985	83.08%	
Registered electors		3,593		
UDF gain from NNO		Swing		

=== 1966 Assembly by-election ===
1966 Nagaland Legislative Assembly by-election: Southern Angami I
Party	Candidate	Votes	%	±%
NNO	K. Khieya	Unopposed		
NNO gain from Independent		Swing		

=== 1964 Assembly election ===
1964 Nagaland Legislative Assembly election: Southern Angami I
Party	Candidate	Votes	%	±%
Independent	Ngurohie Zao	1,205	46.44%	
Independent	Kehozhol Khieya	981	37.80%	
Independent	Vitsonie	409	15.76%	
Margin of victory		224	8.63%	
Turnout		2,595	88.72%	
Registered electors		2,925		
Independent win (new seat)				

== See also ==
- List of constituencies of the Nagaland Legislative Assembly
- Southern Angami II Assembly constituency
