= Pangti =

- Village
- Location of Pangti
- Coordinates: 26.259504°N 94.321044°E
- Country: India
- Region: Northeast India
- State: Nagaland
- District: Wokha
- Elevation: 902 m (2,959 ft)

Population (2011)
  - Total: 7,825
  - Dialect: Lotha
- Time zone: UTC+5:30 (IST)
- PIN: 797100
- Vehicle registration: NL-01
- Sex ratio: 1045 ♂/♀
- Website: nagaland.nic.in

Pangti is one of the biggest villages among the Lothas people of Nagaland state, northeast India. Pangti is located in Sungro Circle of Wokha district. It is 156 km north of the state capital, Kohima. According to 2011 census, the literacy rate of Pangti was 77.13%, with male literacy rate 84.40% and female literacy rate 71.02%.

The village is believed to have been established sometime in the late 1100's or early 1200's A.D., during which time migration had taken place across much of India. The legendary establishment of the village relates back to the village of Lungkhum Jung, between Wokha and Koio, which was compelled to be dissolved/abandoned due to wild tiger(s). Pangti was established with a maximum of 12 clans; no such clans existed in the other Lotha areas during that period. The clans were i) Shitiri, ii) Ngullie, iii) Humtsoe, iv) Kithan, v) Odyui, vi) Kikon, vii) Patton, viii) Jami, ix) Murry, x) Merry, xi) Tsopoe, and xii) Yanthan. To this day, the 12 clans of Pangti village are signified during wedding ceremonies called "hanlam".

Pangti has been the largesr village in the area of the Lothas since 1904. Pangti is the only village in the Lotha area that resisted the British domination and fought with the British forces led by Captain John Butler, fatally wounding him in the ensuing fight.

Pangti is also a place where the division of muddy soil and sandy soil is distinctly divided. Agriculture was the principal occupation of the people but with the establishment of Doyang Hydro Electric Project (DHEP), 50% of the village economy was shot up through fishing. Pangti also happens to be an important spot for Amur falcon, drawing global attention by protecting millions of Amur falcons that pass through Pangti for two months during migration from Mongolia to South Africa. The village organised a welcome programme for the mass release of the Amur falcon on 1 October 2014. As of now, Pangti has been receiving members of visitors, locals, international and national visitors. According to the record being kept by the Amur Falcon Roosting Area Union Pangti (AFRAUP), the village has been nominated for an India Biodiversity Award and earned recognition as the "Falcon Capital of the World".

== Demographics ==
Pangti is located in Sungro Circle of Wokha District, Nagaland with total 1209 families residing. Pangti has a population of 7825 of which 3826 are males while 3999 are females as per Population Census 2011.

== See also ==
- The Pangti Story
