= Mike Pandey =

Indian filmmaker

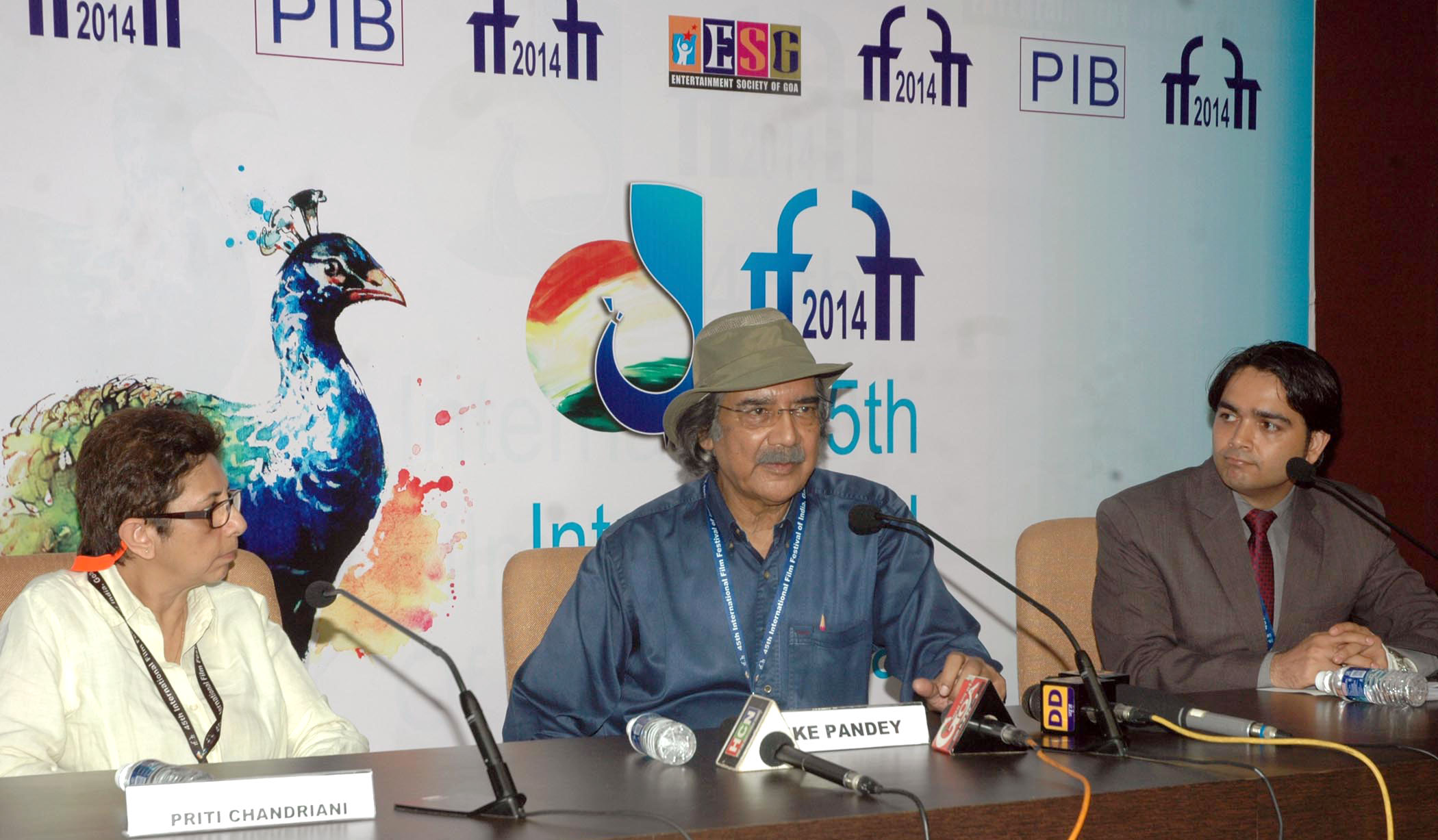
- Mike Pandey, IFFI (2014)
- Born: Nairobi, Kenya
- Citizenship: India
- Occupation: Producer at Riverbank Studios
- Known for: Conservation of Wildlife
- Awards: Green Oscar (1994); Green Oscar (2000); Green Oscar (2004)
- Website: http://www.riverbankstudios.com/

Mike H. Pandey is an Indian film maker, specializing in films about wildlife and the environment. He has won over 300 awards for his work about biodiversity and species conservation, including helping conserve and protect species such as whale sharks, elephants, tigers, vultures and horseshoe crabs.

== Early life ==
A Kenyan citizen by birth, Pandey was born in Nairobi, Kenya, to Indian-origin parents. The Nairobi National Park, which was at the back of the Pandey household inspired Mike and his brother Ishwar. Pandey's photography started when he was seven when his uncle gave him a Kodak Browning Box camera on his birthday.

== Career ==
Trained and educated in the UK and US, Pandey's experiences have included training in Hollywood, as interns, and director of special effects and war scenes in the films Razia Sultan, Betaab and Gazab in India.

He had a chance meeting in Nairobi in the 1970s with future PM Rajiv Gandhi, who encouraged him to immigrate to his ancestral land of India, reportedly telling Pandey: "We need a man of your talents in India." Gandhi helped arrange assignments from Doordarshan for Pandey, although Pandey soon received other commissions as well.

In 1973, Pandey set up Riverbank Studios, a film studio in New Delhi, which focused on creating films about conservation and the wildlife. He subsequently became an Indian citizen.

Pandey has also produced the television programmes Earth Matters – a series on the wildlife and environment of India that has won four international awards and Khullam Khulla – a learning educational series for children. It has also reached 800 million people weekly in multiple languages for 18 years. Pandey has produced over 600 films and won awards both national and International.

Pandey is now working on his latest film - The Return of the Tiger, which is supported by Hindi film Industry actors, Amitabh Bachchan and John Abraham.

== Awards and honours ==
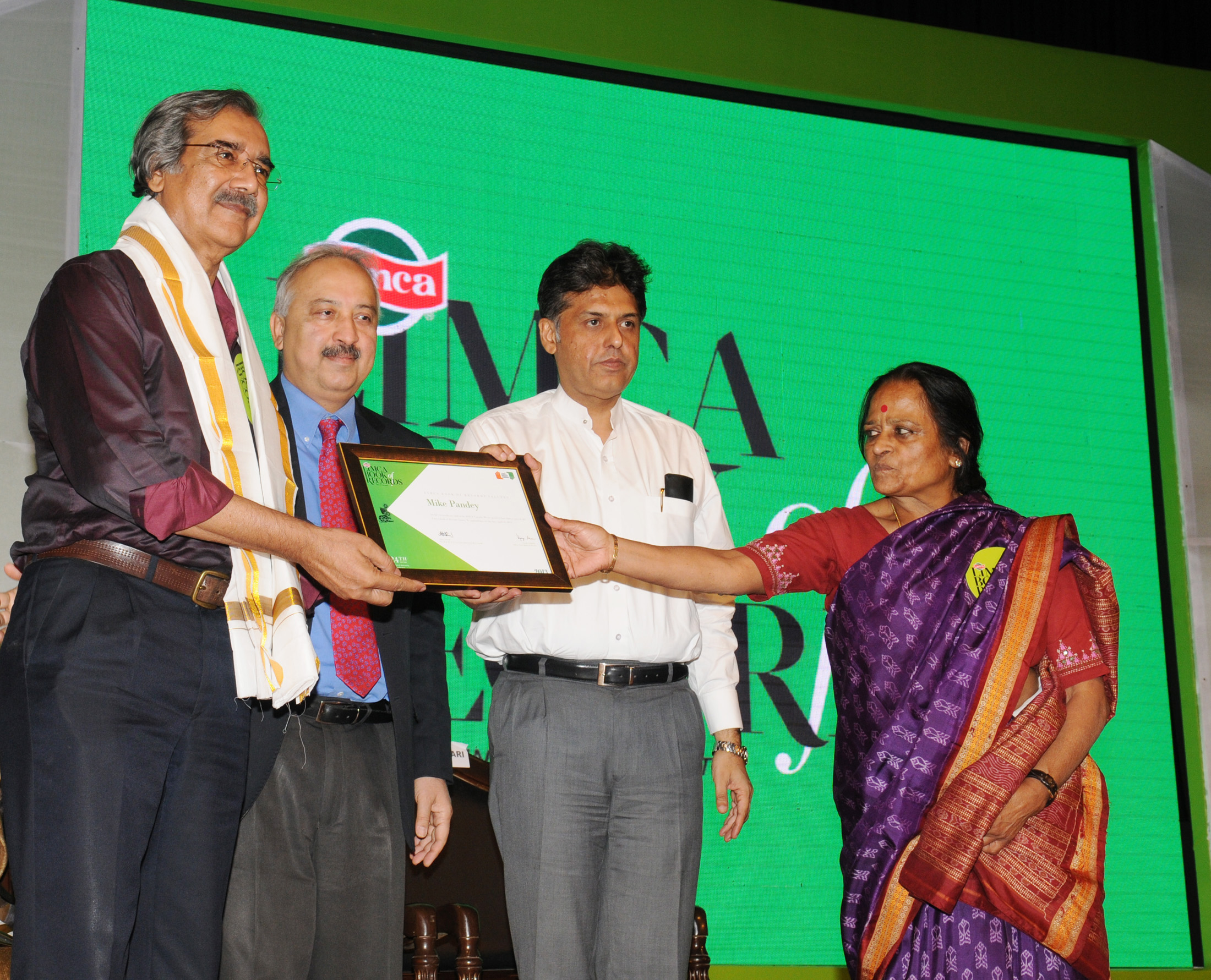
Mike Pandey (left) receiving People of the Year (2013): Limca Book of Record, from Manish Tewari (second from right)

- In 1994, he became the first Asian producer / director to win the Wildscreen Panda Award, also known as the Green Oscar, for his film The Last Migration - Wild Elephant Capture in Surguja.
- In 2000, his film Shores of Silence: Whale Sharks in India, won the Green Oscar for the second time. The film also led to the ban on the killing of whale sharks on Indian shores. This film has also won a National Award for Best Film in the "Exploration & Adventure" Category, 2005.
- In October 2004, he won the Green Oscar for the third time for his film Vanishing Giants – a story of his involvement with elephants. This film also led to the ban of cruel and outdated techniques of elephant capture in India.
- The CMS – UNEP Award for Outstanding Achievement In Global Conservation, or the Prithvi Ratan Award was given to Pandey at the CMS Vatavaran Film Festival in November 2003, for his outstanding contribution towards generating awareness, which led to the conservation of a global heritage - the Whale Shark. Pandey was also presented with the Award for Cinematic Excellence by Western India's Cinematographers Association in Mumbai, 2005.
- He was honoured with the V Shantaram Award at the Mumbai International film Festival in Mumbai in 2012.
