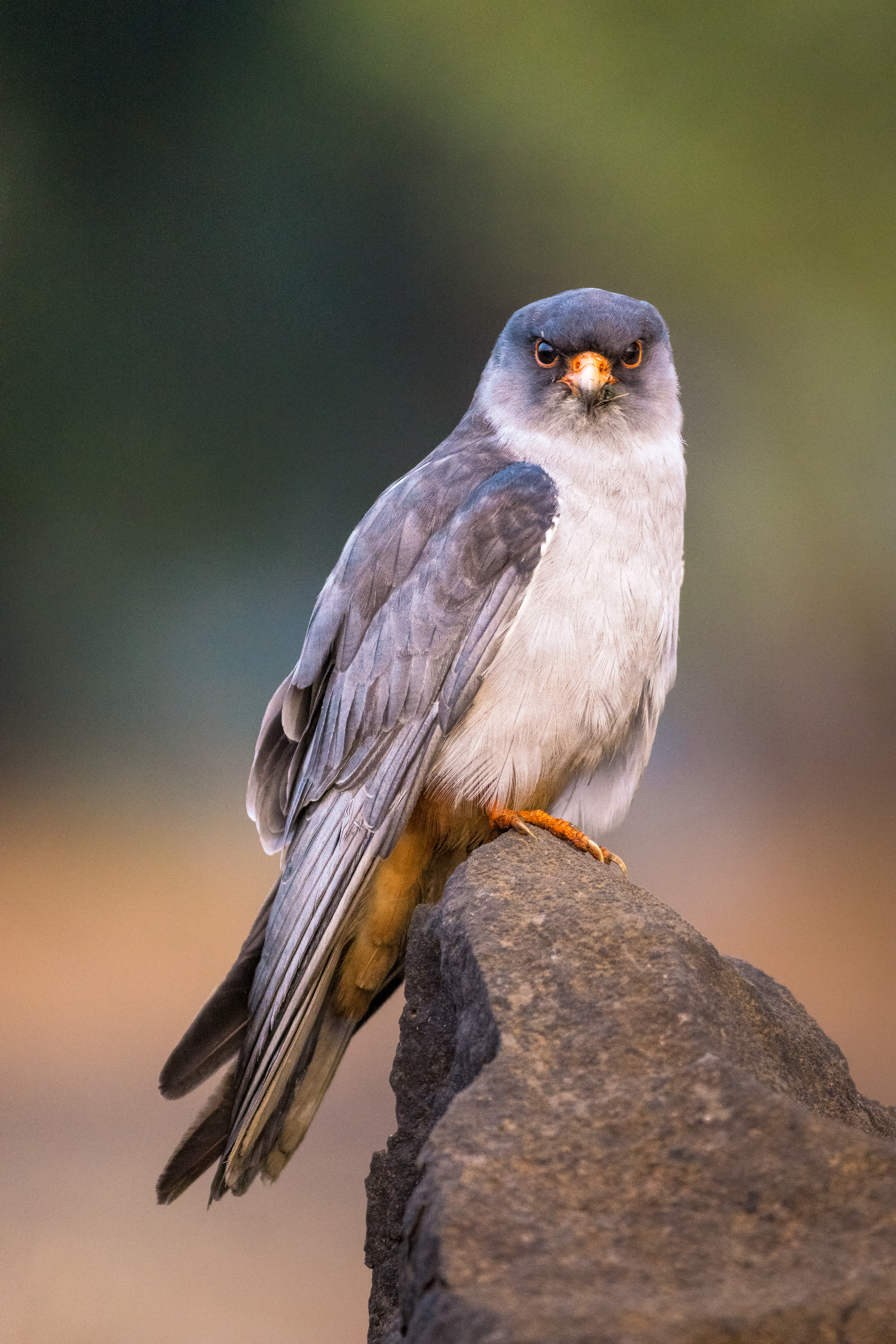
- Male
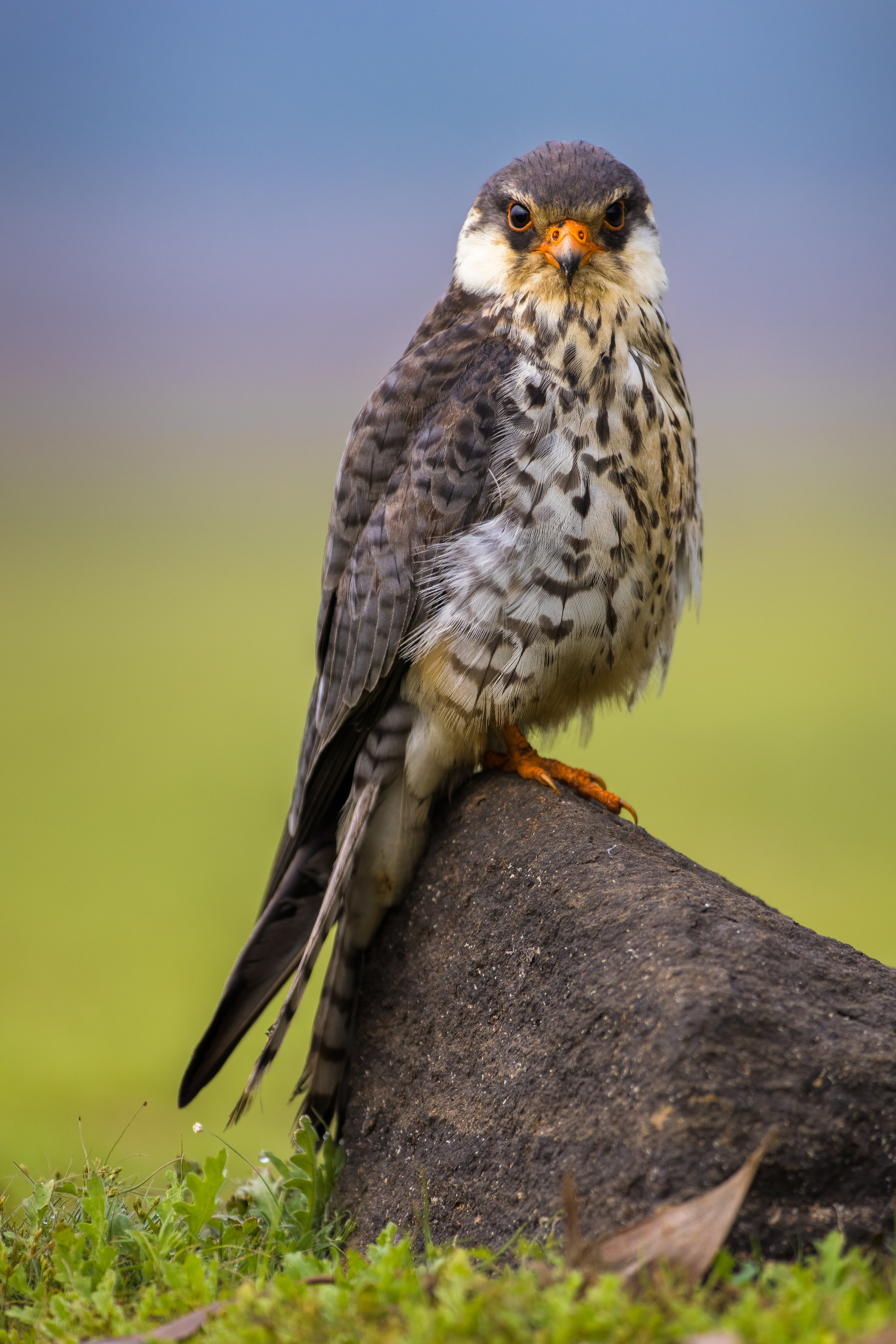
- Female

Conservation status
- Least Concern (IUCN 3.1)

Scientific classification
- Kingdom: Animalia
- Phylum: Chordata
- Class: Aves
- Order: Falconiformes
- Family: Falconidae
- Genus: Falco
- Species: F. amurensis

Binomial name
- Falco amurensis Radde, 1863
- Breeding Non-breeding

Synonyms
- Erythropus amurensis; Falco vespertinus var. amurensis; Call of Falco amurensis - Amur Falcon

= Amur falcon =

Species of bird

The Amur falcon (Falco amurensis) is a small raptor of the falcon family. It breeds in south-eastern Siberia and Northern China before migrating in large flocks across India and over the Arabian Sea to winter in Southern and East African coasts.

== Description ==
Males are characteristically dark sooty grey above with rufous thighs and vent. In flight, the wing lining is white, contrasting with the dark wing feathers. Adult males of the closely related red-footed falcon have a dark grey wing lining. In Africa, males can be confused with melanistic Gabar goshawks, but the chestnut on the vent is distinctive. Also, there may be some superficial resemblance to the sooty falcon and the grey kestrel, but those two species both have yellow feet and cere. The wings are long as in most falcons (with a span of 63–71 cm) and at rest the wing tip reaches or extends just beyond the tail-tip.

Females can be more difficult to identify as they share a pattern common to many falcons, but are distinctive in having an orange eye-ring, a red cere and reddish orange feet. Juveniles can be confused only with those of the red-footed falcon, but lack the buffy underwing coverts.

== Taxonomy ==
The Amur falcon was long considered a subspecies or morph of the red-footed falcon, but it is nowadays considered a distinct species. Nonetheless, it is the red-footed falcon's closest relative; their relationship to other falcons is more enigmatic. They appear morphologically somewhat intermediate between kestrels and hobbies and DNA sequence data has been unable to further resolve this question, mainly due to lack of comprehensive sampling.

The genus name Falco is Late Latin and derives from falx, falcis, a sickle, referencing the claws of the bird. The species name amurensis is from Amurland in south-eastern Siberia.

== Distribution and migration ==
Measurements
Length	♂	275–290 mm (10.8–11.4 in)
	♀	285–300 mm (11.2–11.8 in)
Tail	♂	123–130 mm (4.8–5.1 in)
	♀	129–132 mm (5.1–5.2 in)
Head	♂	41–43 mm (1.6–1.7 in)
	♀	42–44 mm (1.7–1.7 in)
Tarsus	♂	60–62 mm (2.4–2.4 in)
	♀	65–67 mm (2.6–2.6 in)
Weight	♂	97–155 g (3.4–5.5 oz)
	♀	111–188 g (3.9–6.6 oz)

The Amur falcon breeds in east Asia from the Transbaikalia, Amurland, and northern Mongolian region to parts of North Korea. They migrate in a broad front through India and Sri Lanka, sometimes further east over Thailand and Cambodia and then over the Arabian Sea, sometimes in passage on the Maldives and other islands to reach southern Africa. Birds going over India are thought to be aided by strong winds blowing westward. These winds are strong at an altitude of about 3000m and the birds are thought to fly at a height of above 1000m during migration. The route taken to return to their breeding grounds runs slightly more northward. Because of its tendency to wander long distances over the ocean while migrating, this falcon has been found in locations far outside its normal range, such as in Italy, Sweden, Tristan da Cunha, St. Helena and the United Kingdom.

During the non-breeding season, the Amur falcon moults before migrating north. Adults replace all flight feathers whereas juveniles only replace tail feathers.

== Behaviour and ecology ==
=== Foraging and food ===
The Amur falcon feeds mainly late in the evening or early in the morning capturing a wide range of insects in the air or on the ground. They capture most of their prey in flight, sometimes by hovering, but will also pick prey by alighting on the ground. The winter diet appears to be almost entirely made up of insects but they take small birds, mammals and amphibians to feed their young in their breeding range. The rains in Africa produce swarms of termites, locusts, ants and beetles that provide ample food. Their migration over the Arabian Sea coincides with the timing of the migration of dragonflies (Pantala flavescens) and these are thought to provide food during the most arduous part of their migration route.

=== Nesting ===
During migration they stay in open forest or grasslands, roosting colonially on exposed perches or wires. Their breeding habitat is open wooded country with marshes. The breeding season is May to June and several pairs may nest close together. Abandoned nest platforms belonging to birds of prey or corvids and even tree hollows are re-used for nesting. In Mongolia and Eastern Russia, they utilize the nests of the Eurasian Magpie (Pica pica) and significantly favor nests covered with a dome structure. They prefer to nest in areas within their home range that have not recently been disturbed by fire. Three or four eggs are laid (at two day intervals). Both parents take turns to incubate and feed the chicks which hatch after about a month. The young birds leave the nest after about a month.

=== Parasites ===
The Amur falcon hosts three species of lice, Degeeriella rufa, Colpocephalum subzerafae, and Laembothrion tinnunculi. The abundance of the lice is affected by the age of the individual. Juveniles have a higher abundance of Colpocephalum subzerafae and Degeeriella rufa than adult falcons. Additionally, Degeeriella rufa seems to exhibit a female bias in adults.

== Status and conservation ==
The wide breeding range and large population size of the Amur falcon have led to the species being assessed as being of least concern. The flocking behaviour during migration and the density at which they occur, however, expose them to hunting and other threats. During their migration from their breeding area to the winter quarters, they are plump and are hunted for food in parts of northeastern India as well as in eastern Africa. In 2012, mass trapping and capture of migrating Amur falcons at Pangti village in Nagaland (India) was reported in the media and a successful campaign was begun to prevent their killing. As part of this campaign, three birds were fitted with 5 gm satellite transmitters that allowed them to be tracked during their migration.

A study into the drivers that helped turn Amur falcon hunters into protectors at Pangti, suggests that strong leadership and shared responsibility among village institutions were key. It found that local leaders successfully navigated power struggles over limited NGO and government funds, leading to a unified conservation effort. Media praise, awards, and the growth of tourism fostered a sense of pride within the community, contributing to a shift in attitudes toward conservation. These efforts also had positive spillover effects, including air gun bans and shorter hunting seasons. However, villagers continue to seek development opportunities as part of the conservation agreement. For long-term sustainability, it's essential to build trust by respecting local institutions and engaging in fair, transparent negotiations.

== Gallery ==
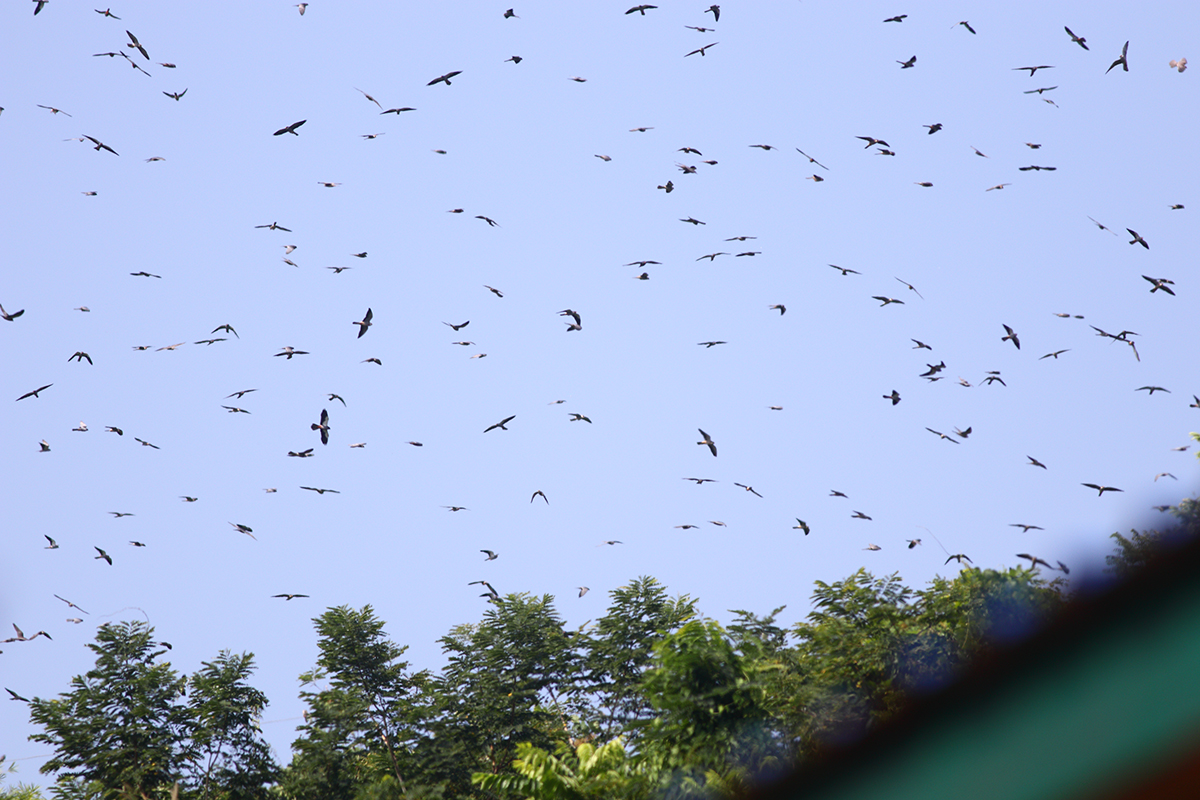
During the migration season, Pangti, Nagaland, India

Amur falcon female in a grassland habitat, in Maharashtra, India

Amur falcon male in a rocky habitat in Maharashtra, India

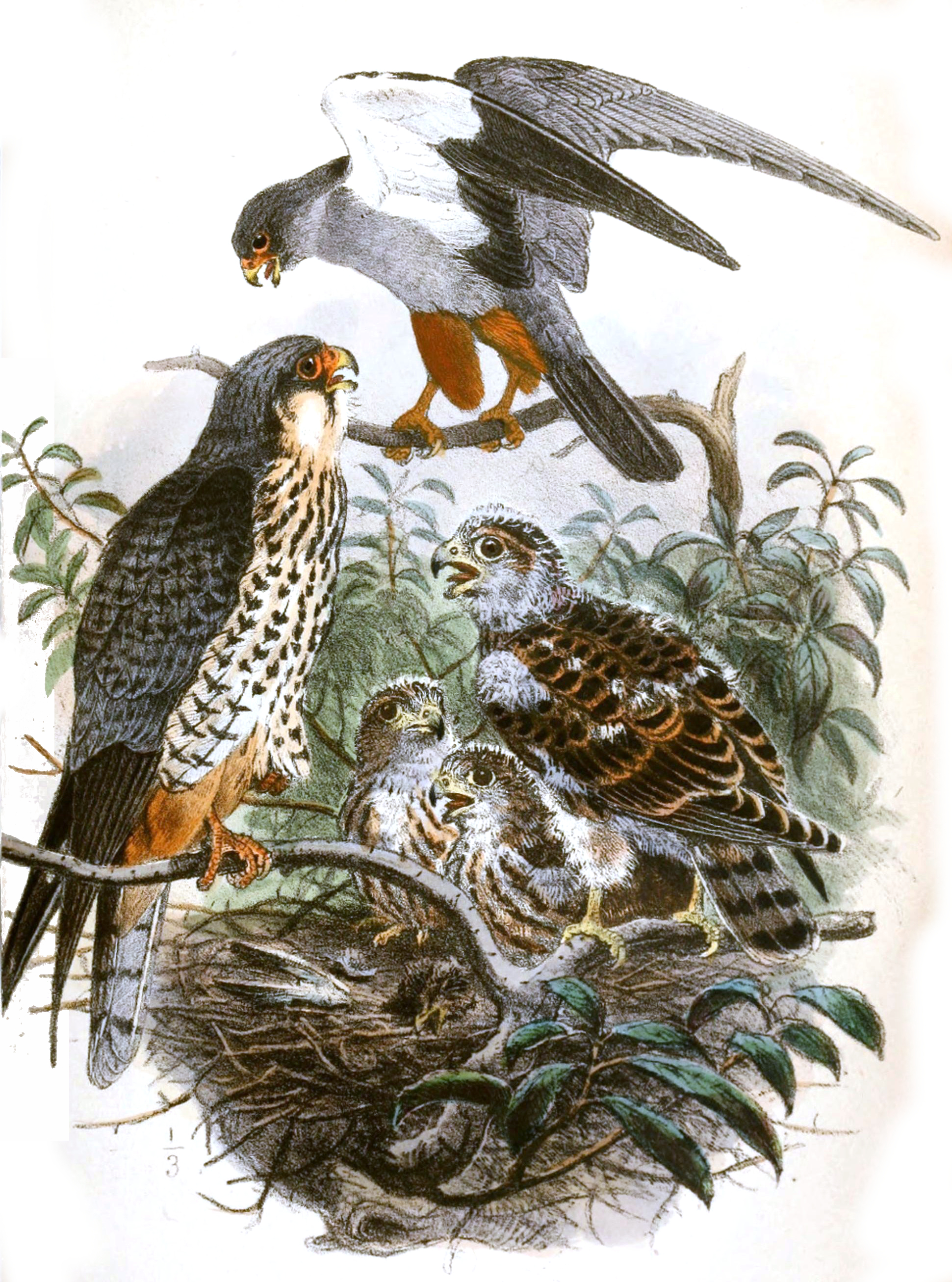
Nesting pair with chicks

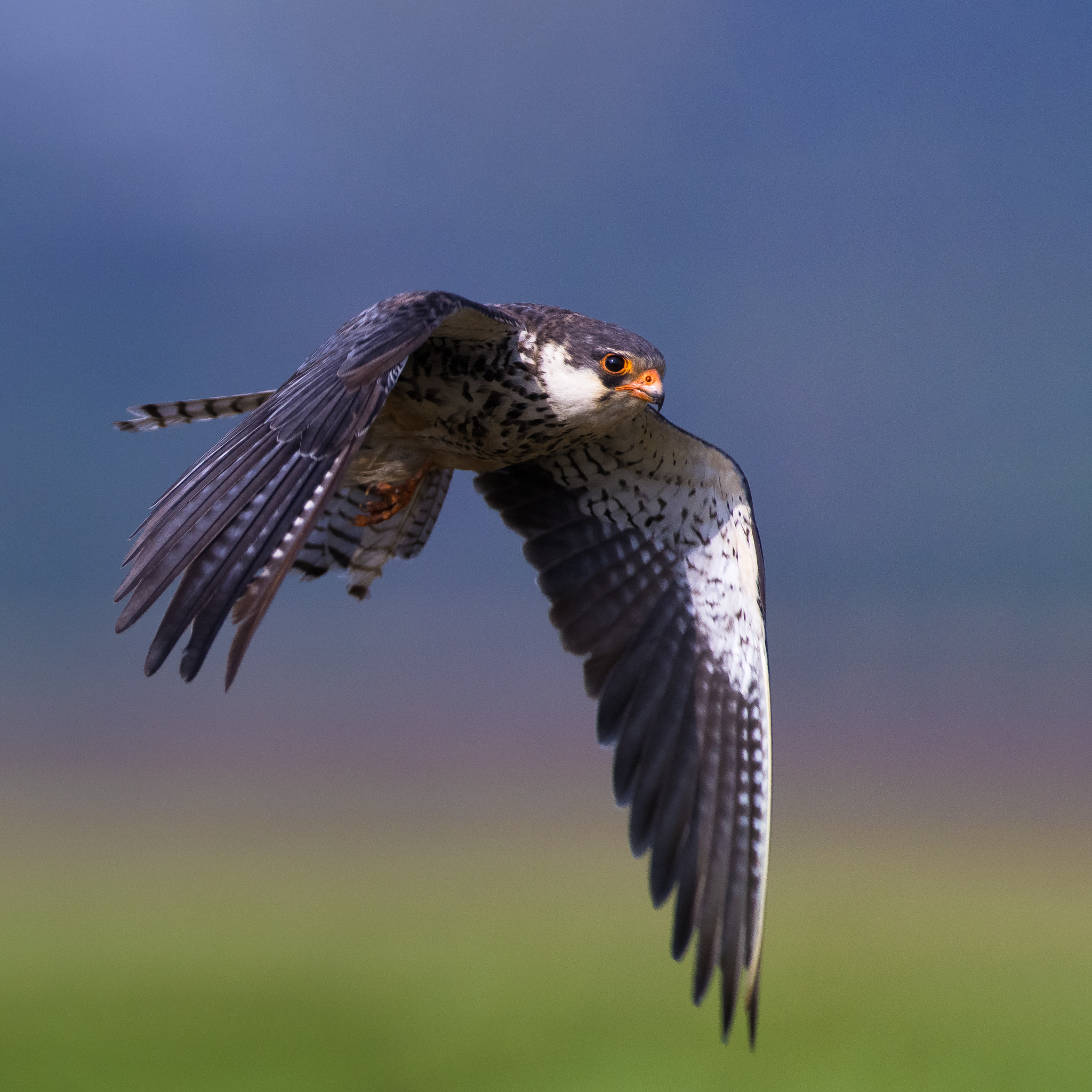
Amur falcon female in flight

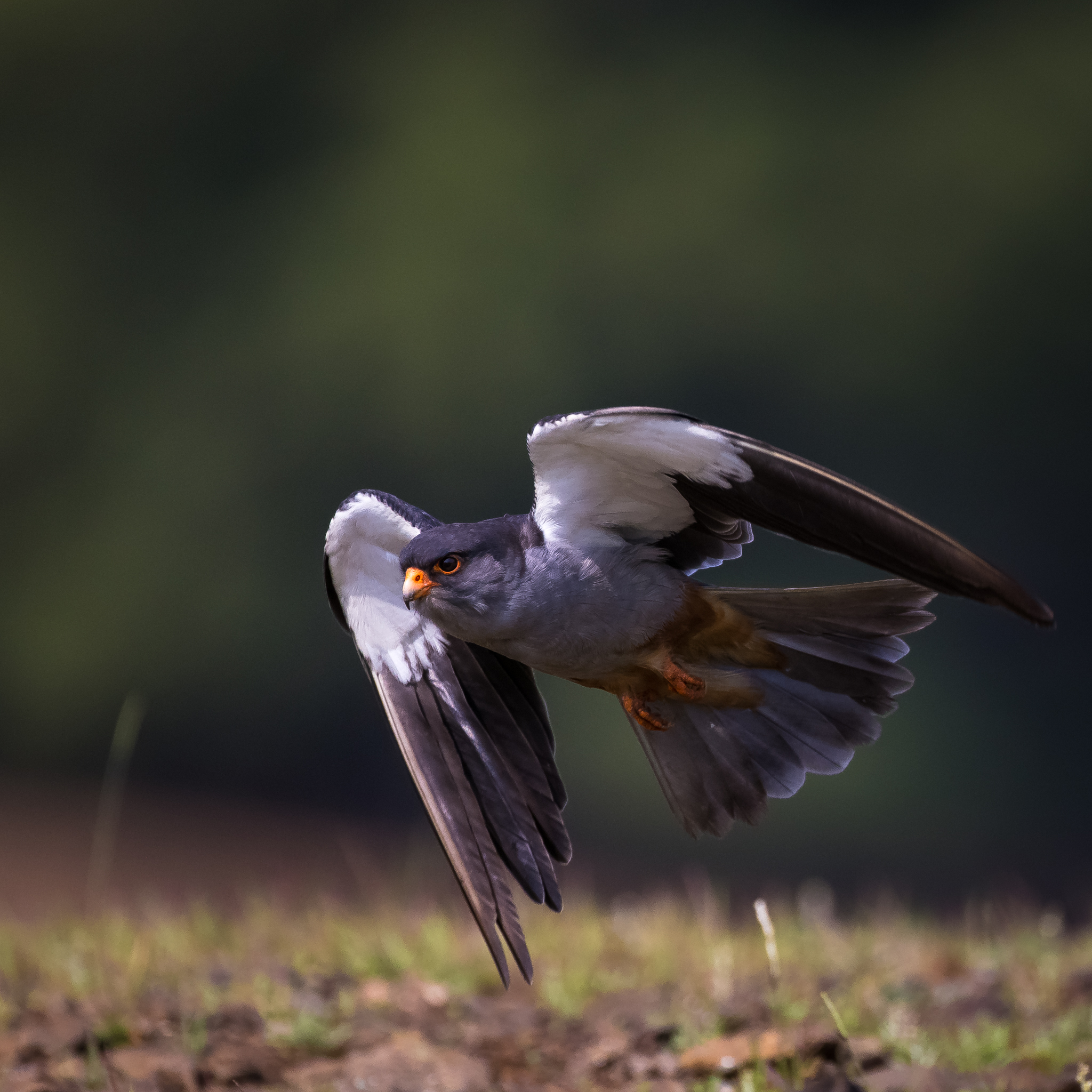
Amur falcon male in flight

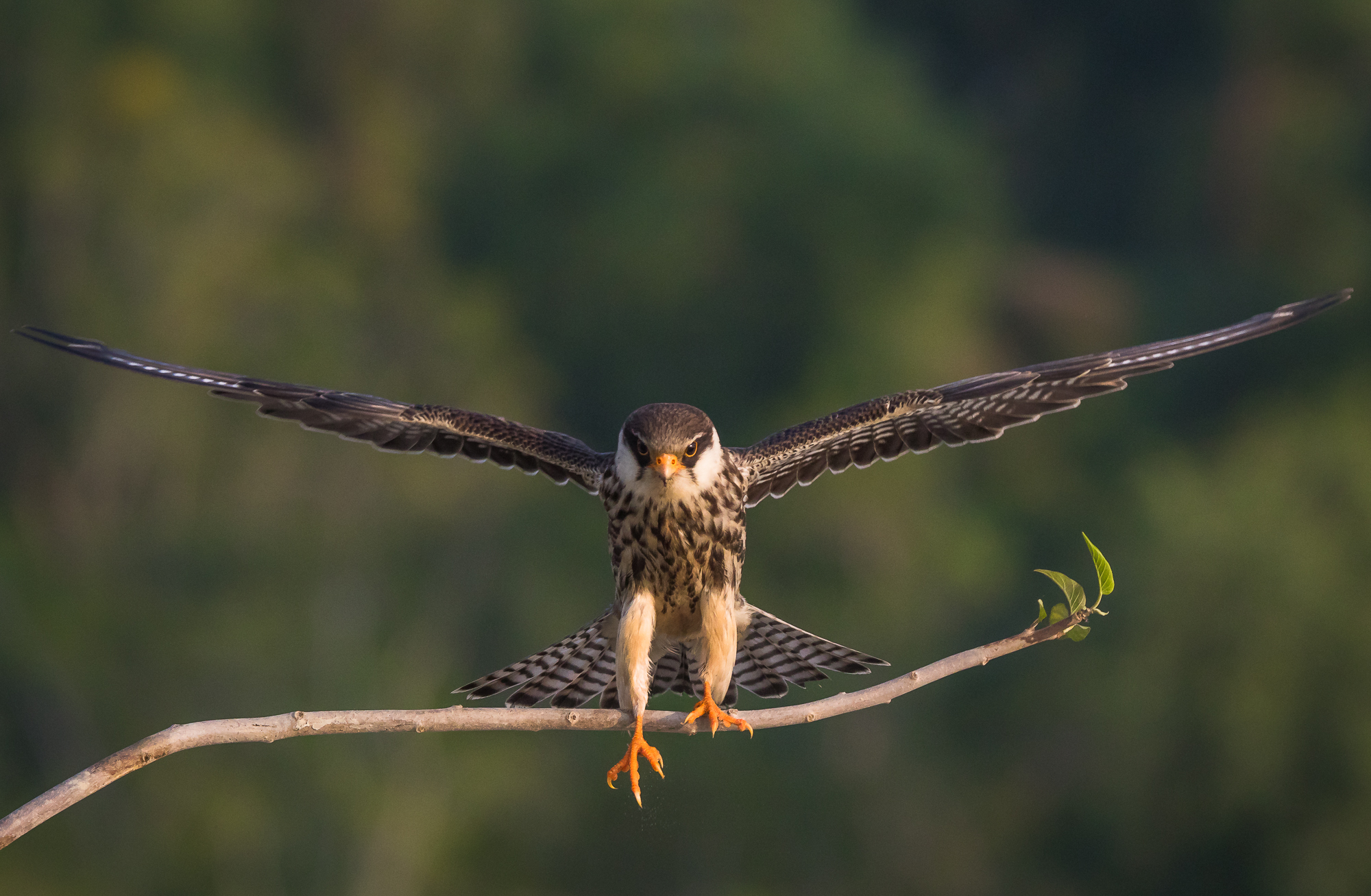
Amur falcon female in flight, Tengragiri Wildlife Sanctuary, Bangladesh

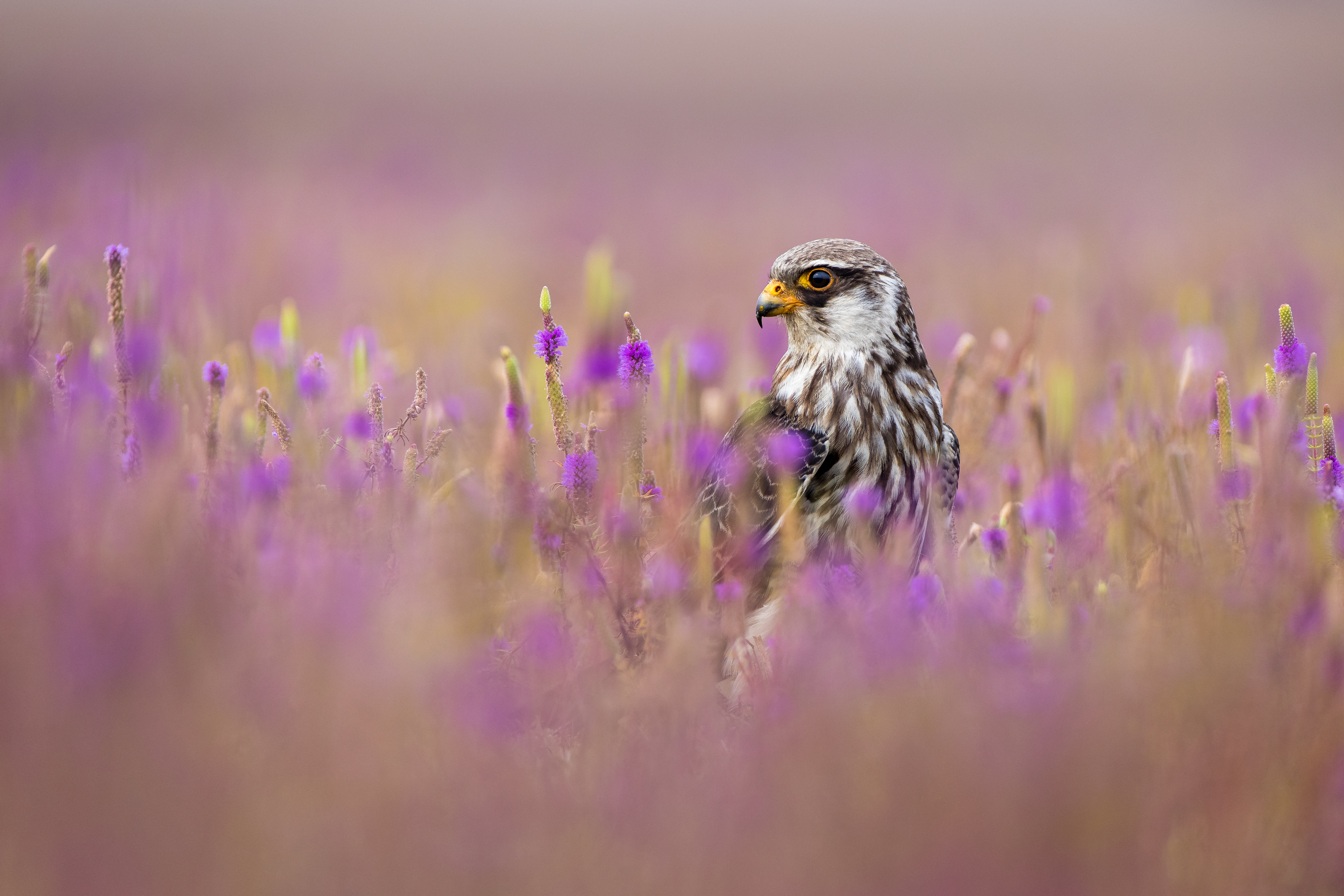
Amur falcon female in a bed of grass

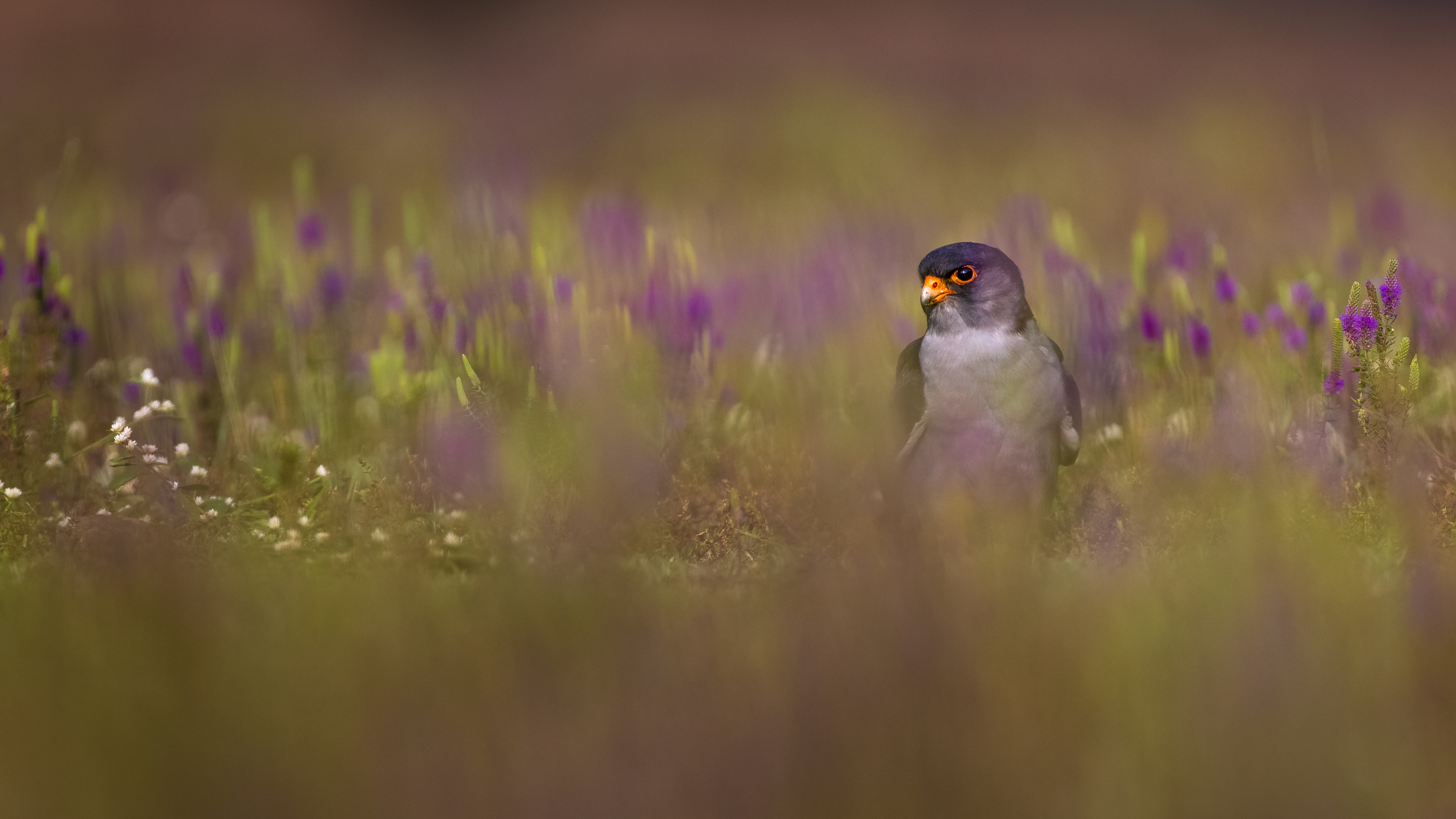
Amur falcon male in a bed of grass

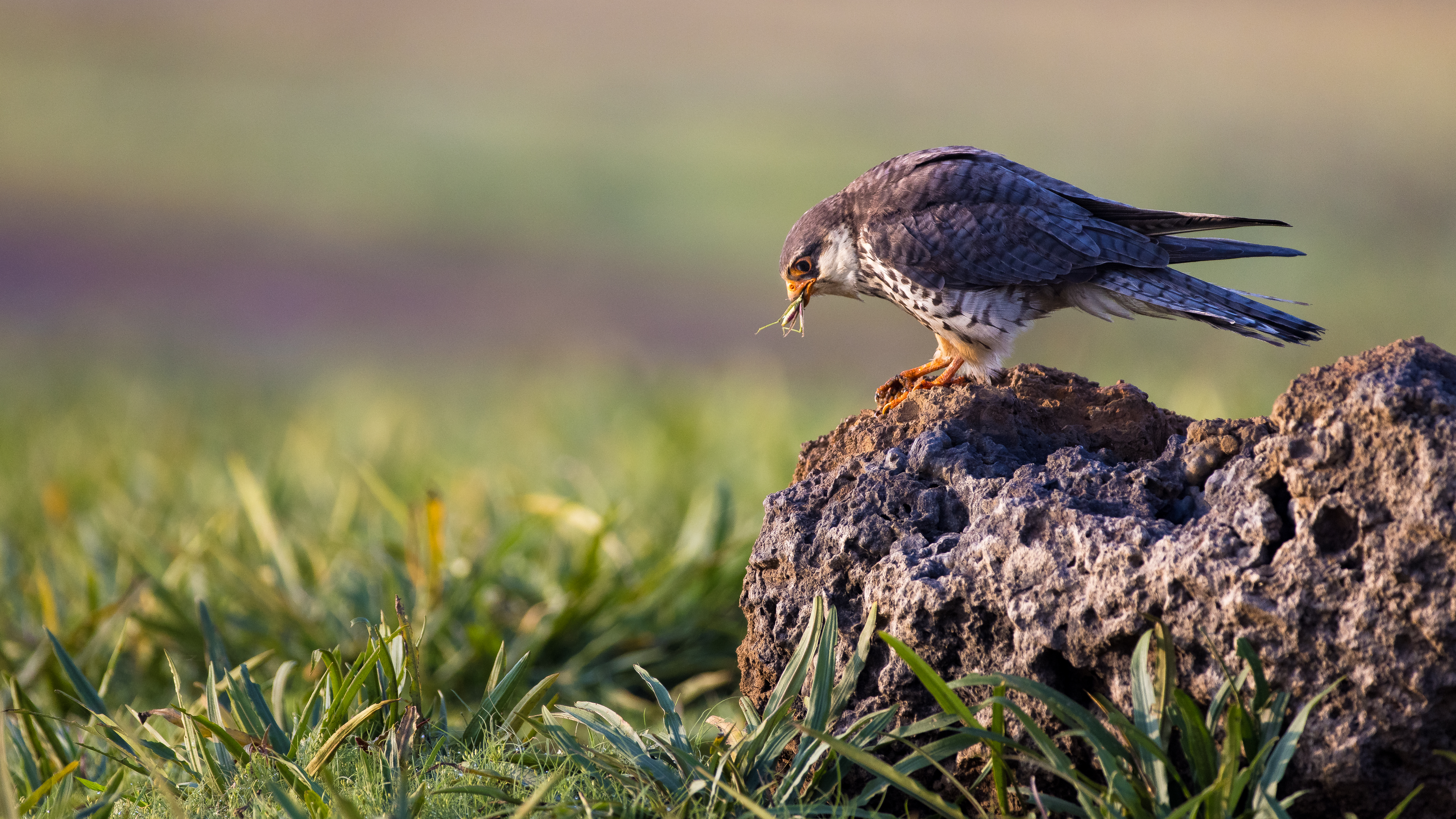
Amur falcon female with a grasshopper catch

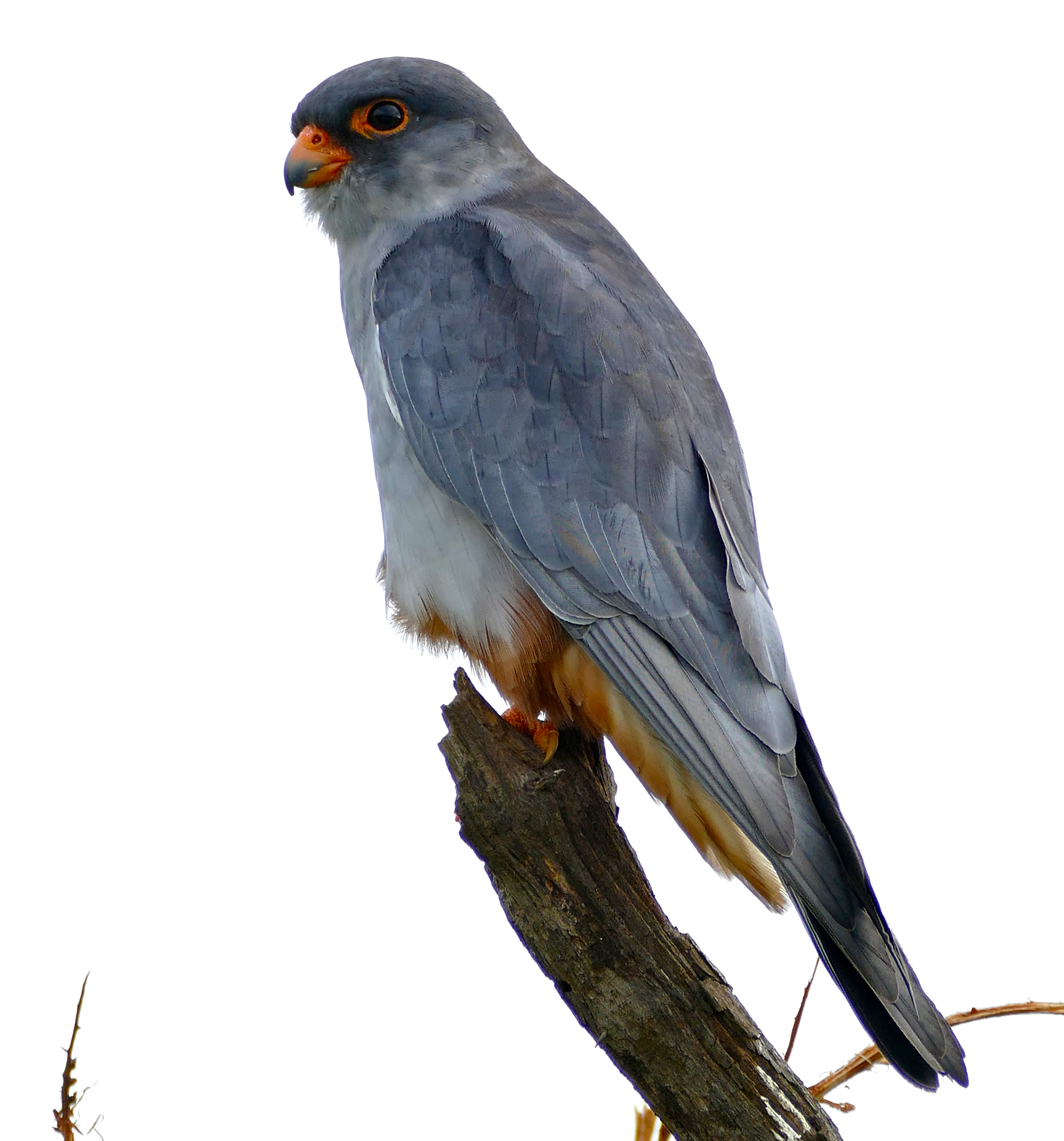
Individual male at Lower Sabie, Kruger National Park, South Africa

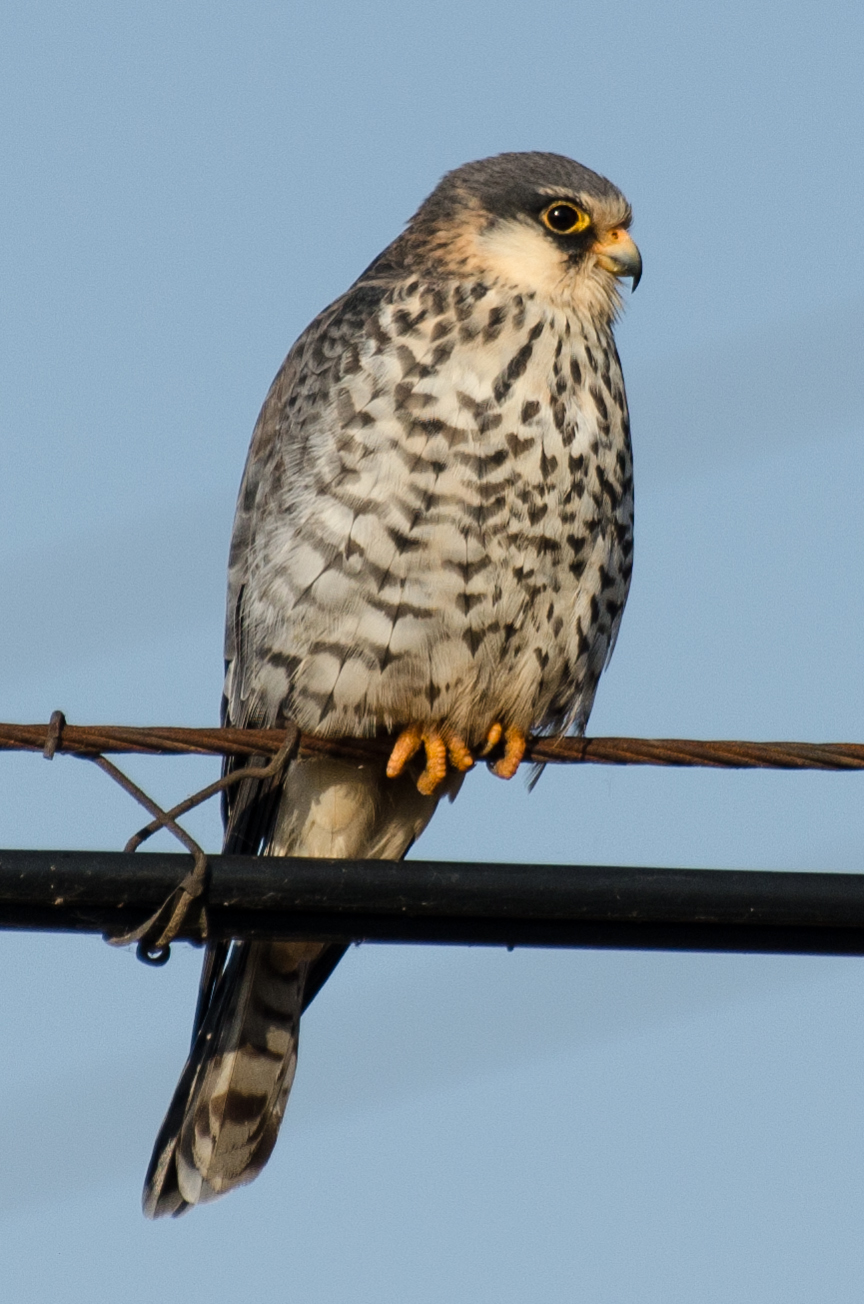
Female Amur falcon, Huanzidong Reservoir(獾子洞水库), Liaoning, China, at the start of autumn migration

== See also ==
- The Pangti Story
