= Oligodon nikhili =

Conservation status
- Data Deficient (IUCN 3.1)

Scientific classification
- Kingdom: Animalia
- Phylum: Chordata
- Class: Reptilia
- Order: Squamata
- Suborder: Serpentes
- Family: Colubridae
- Genus: Oligodon
- Species: O. nikhili

Binomial name
- Oligodon nikhili Whitaker & Dattatri, 1982

Species of snake

Oligodon nikhili, known commonly as Nikhil's kukri snake, is a species of snake in the subfamily Colubrinae of the family Colubridae. The species is endemic to the Palani Hills of southern India.

== Etymology ==
Both the specific name, nikhili, and the common name, Nikhil's kukri snake, are in honor of Nikhil Whitaker (born 1979), the son of herpetologist Romulus Whitaker.

== Description ==
The holotype of Oligodon nikhili, an adult male, has a snout-to-vent length (SVL) of 35 cm (14 in), plus a tail length of 7.3 cm (2.9 in). The smooth dorsal scales of the body are arranged in 17 rows on the neck, in 15 rows at midbody, and in 15 rows slightly anterior to the vent. The holotype has 144 ventrals, a divided anal scale, and 33 pairs of subcaudals.

== Habitat ==
The preferred natural habitat of Oligodon nikhili is forest, at elevations of approximately 1,500 m (4,900 ft).

== Behavior ==
Oligodon nikhili is terrestrial.

== Reproduction ==
Oligodon nikhili is oviparous.
