= Vikho-o Yhoshü =

Indian politician (1951–2019)

Speaker of Nagaland Legislative Assembly
- In office 13 March 2018 – 30 December 2019
- Succeeded by: Sharingain Longkümer

Member of Nagaland Legislative Assembly
- In office 2008–2019
- Preceded by: Medokul Sophie
- Succeeded by: Medo Yhokha
- Constituency: Southern Angami I

Personal details
- Born: Vikho-o Yhoshü; 1 October 1951 Kigwema Village, Nagaland
- Died: 30 December 2019 (aged 68) Mumbai, Maharashtra, India
- Party: Nationalist Democratic Progressive Party
- Other political affiliations: Naga People's Front (Before 2018)
- Children: Sesino Yhoshü
- Education: Indian School of Mines, Dhanbad

Vikho-o Yhoshü (1 October 1951 – 30 December 2019) was an Indian politician from Nagaland. He was a member of the Nationalist Democratic Progressive Party. He was elected to the Nagaland Legislative Assembly in 2013 and 2018 from the Southern Angami-I constituency as a candidate of the Nationalist Democratic Progressive Party. He was the speaker of Nagaland Legislative Assembly in 2018-19.

== Death ==
On 30 December 2019, Yhoshü died of lung cancer in a hospital in Mumbai. He was an alumnus of Indian School of Mines, Dhanbad, graduating in mining in 1974.
