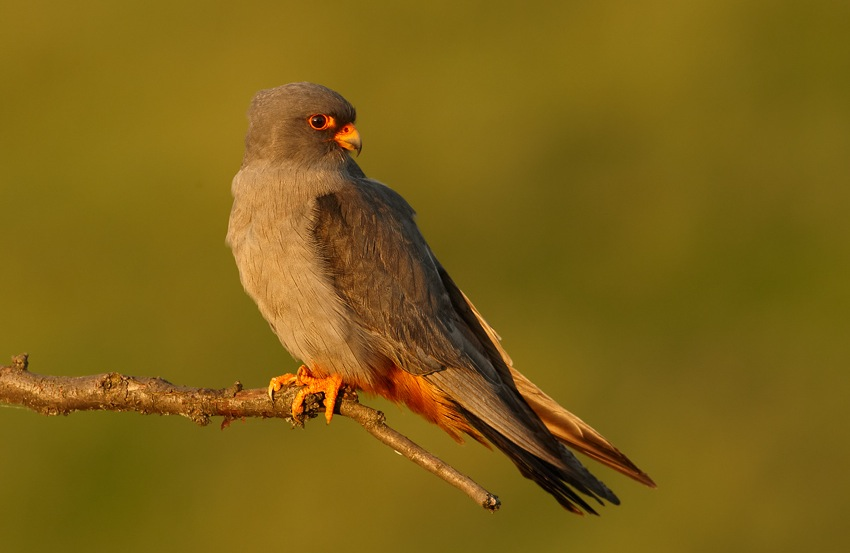
- Male
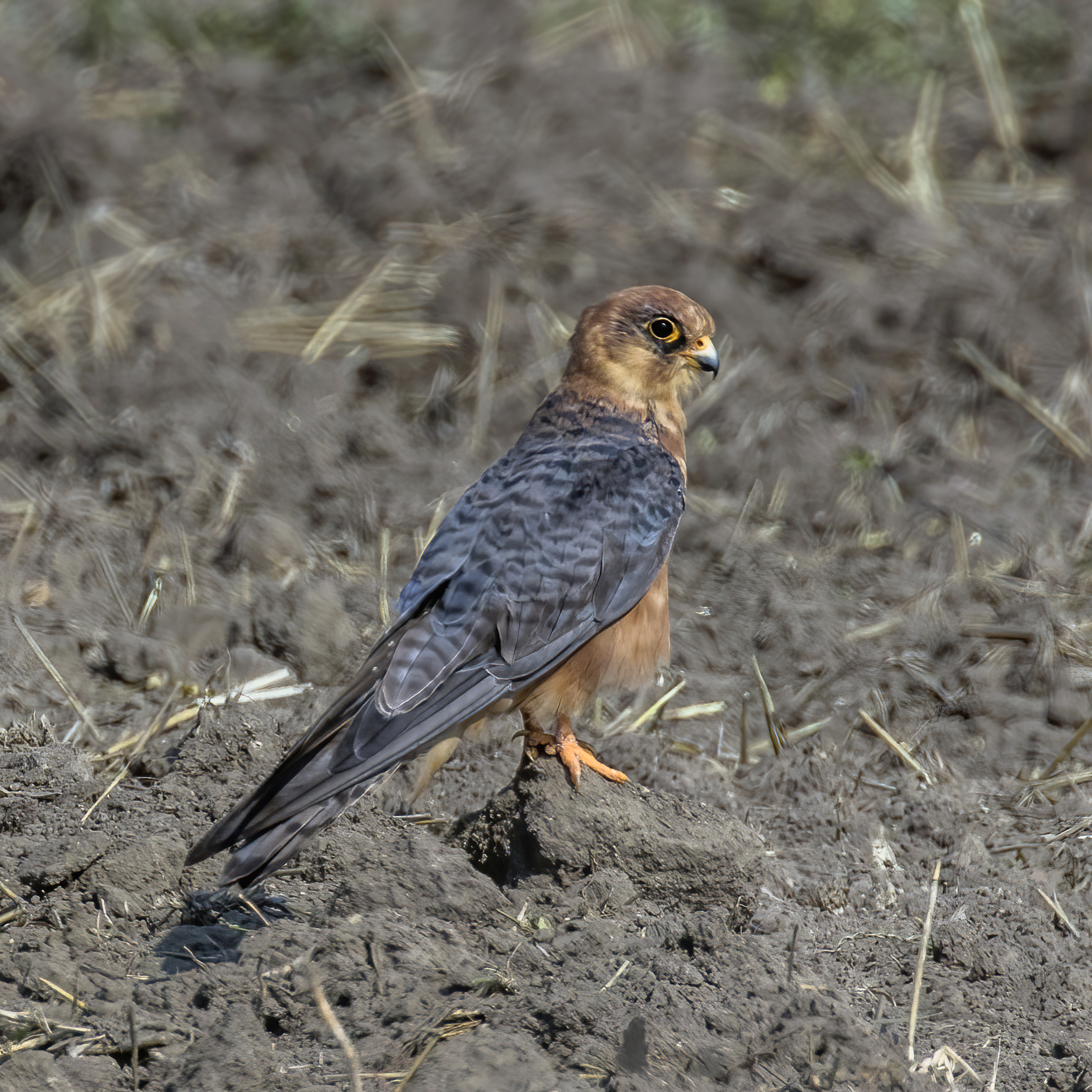
- Female both near Kecskemét, Hungary

Conservation status
- Vulnerable (IUCN 3.1)

Scientific classification
- Kingdom: Animalia
- Phylum: Chordata
- Class: Aves
- Order: Falconiformes
- Family: Falconidae
- Genus: Falco
- Species: F. vespertinus

Binomial name
- Falco vespertinus Linnaeus, 1766
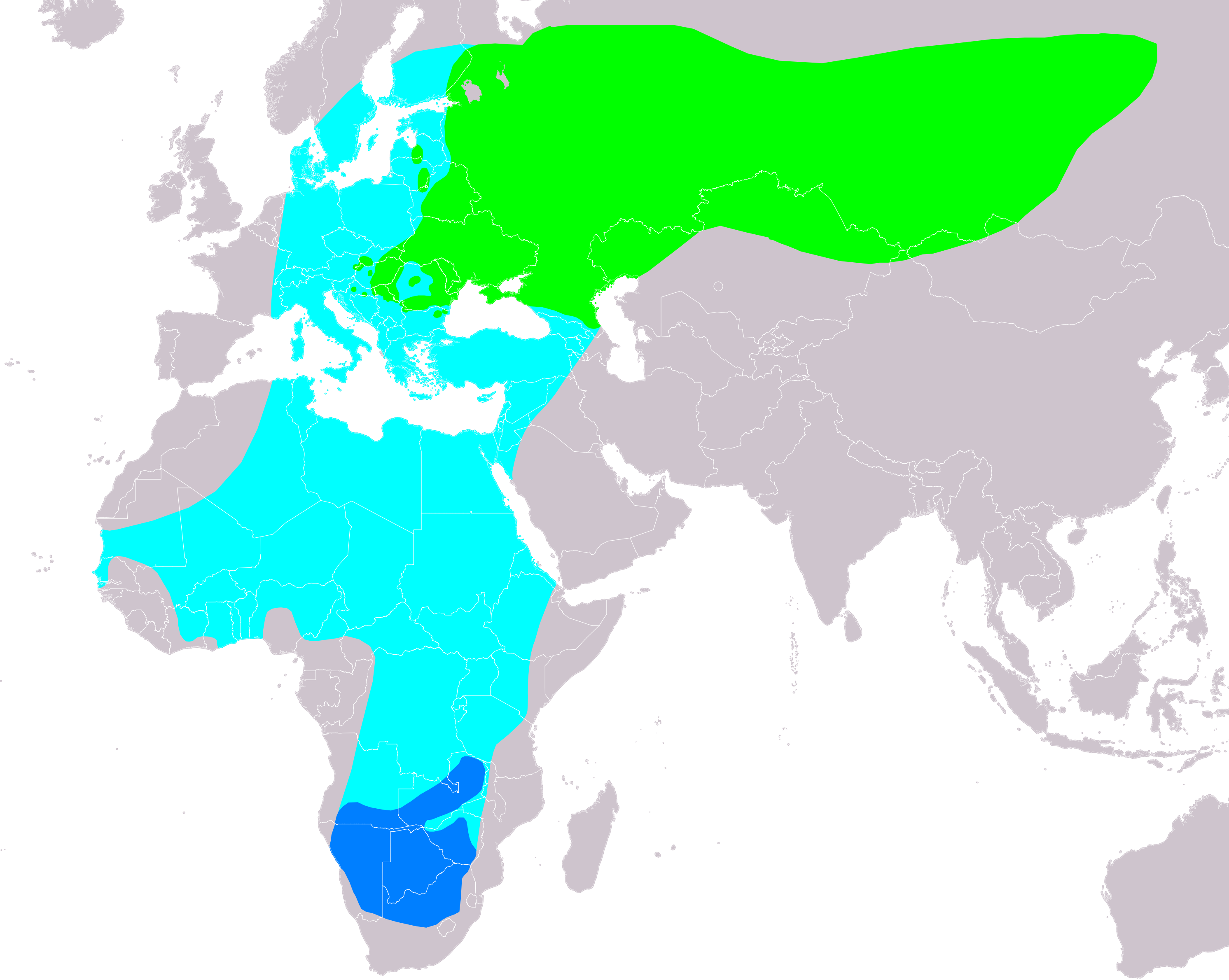
- Range of F. vespertinus Breeding Passage Non-breeding

Synonyms
- Falco vespertinus vespertinus Linnaeus, 1766

= Red-footed falcon =

Species of bird

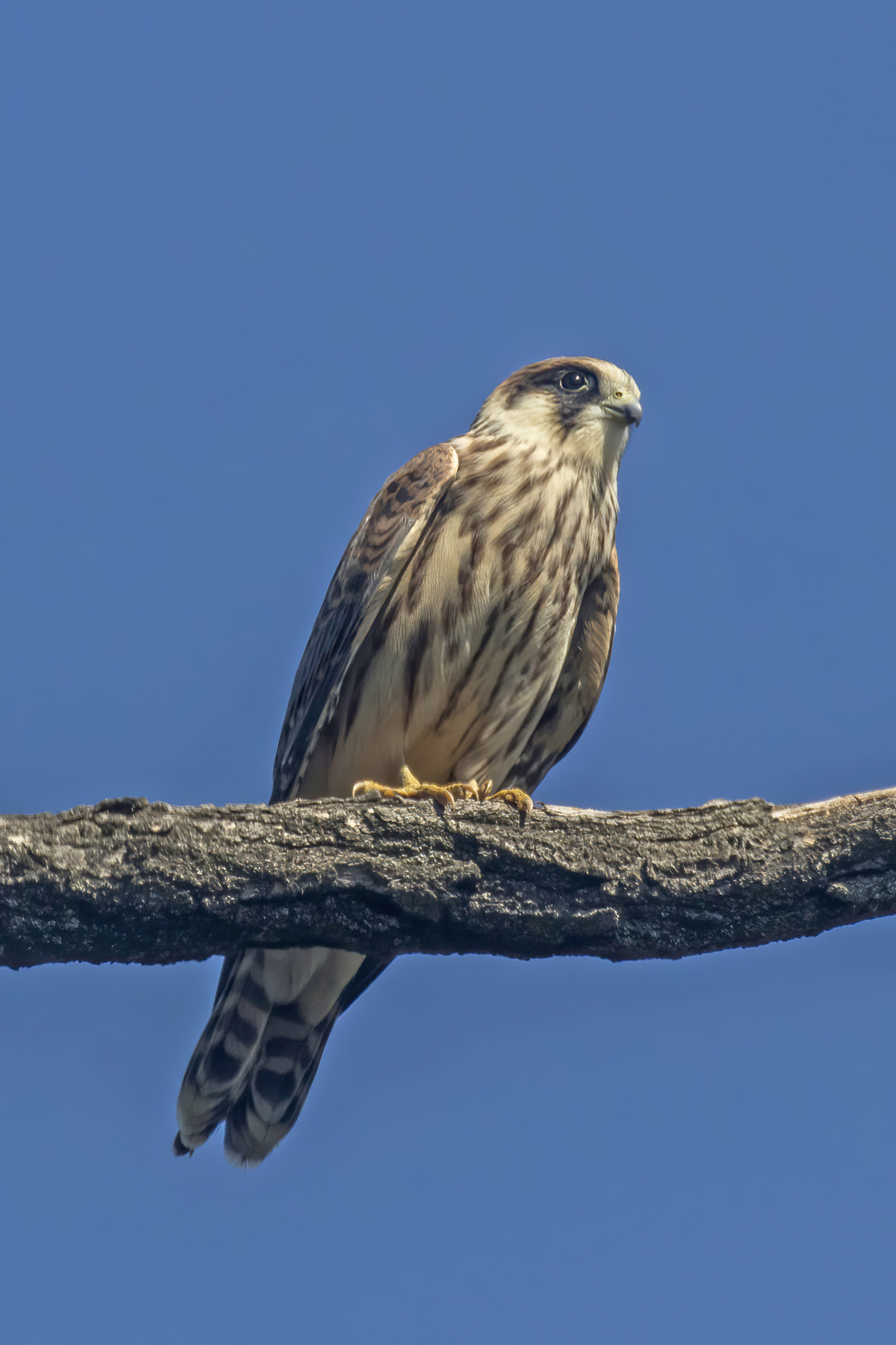
Juvenile

The red-footed falcon (Falco vespertinus), formerly the western red-footed falcon, is a bird of prey. It belongs to the family Falconidae, the falcons. This bird is found in eastern Europe and Asia although its numbers are dwindling rapidly due to habitat loss and hunting. It is migratory, wintering in Africa. It is a regular wanderer to western Europe, and in August 2004 a red-footed falcon was found in North America for the first time on the island of Martha's Vineyard, Massachusetts.

== Taxonomy ==
The Amur falcon was formerly included herein as a subspecies but it is nowadays considered distinct. Nonetheless, it is the present species' closest relative; their relationship to other falcons is more enigmatic. They appear morphologically somewhat intermediate between kestrels and hobbies and DNA sequence data has been unable to further resolve this question, mainly due to lack of comprehensive sampling. They might be closer to the merlin than to most other living falcons, or more generally related to this species and American falcons such as the American kestrel and the aplomado falcon.

The genus name Falco is from Late Latin falx, falcis, a sickle, referencing the claws of the bird. The species name vespertinus is Latin for "of evening" from vesper, "evening".

== Description ==
It is a medium-small, long-winged species. The adult male is all blue-grey, except for his red undertail and legs; its underwings are uniformly grey. The female has a grey back and wings, orange head and underparts, and a white face with black eye stripe and moustaches.

Young birds are brown above and buff below with dark streaks, and a face pattern like the female. Red-footed falcons are 28–34 cm (11–13 in) in length with a wingspan of 65–75 cm (26–30 in). The average mass is 155 g (5.5 oz).

== Distribution ==
The main areas of European distribution are in southern Russia and Ukraine. The species occurs in large numbers in Hungary, Romania and Serbia. Smaller populations exist in Italy, Bulgaria and Moldova, in Austria, Slovakia and in Belarus. The red-footed falcon also breeds irregularly in the Czech Republic and in the Baltic States, occasionally also in Germany. In Asia, the breeding occurrences run in a relatively narrow band somewhat south of the taiga eastwards to the upper Lena, where they touch the range of the sister species Falco amurensis east of the Baikal. The northern border lies between the 63° and 58° north latitude, the south border around 45° north latitude. It runs along the north slope of the Altai and then westward follows the transition of open pine forests into the treeless steppe areas of Central Asia. Further to the west, the breeding areas on the lower reaches of the Volga and on the north coast of the Caspian Sea reach Europe. The southernmost occurrences are in the steppe areas north of the Caucasus and in South Georgia. Some isolated breeding areas are located in northern Turkey. The red-footed falcon winters in southern and eastern Africa.

== Breeding and behaviour ==
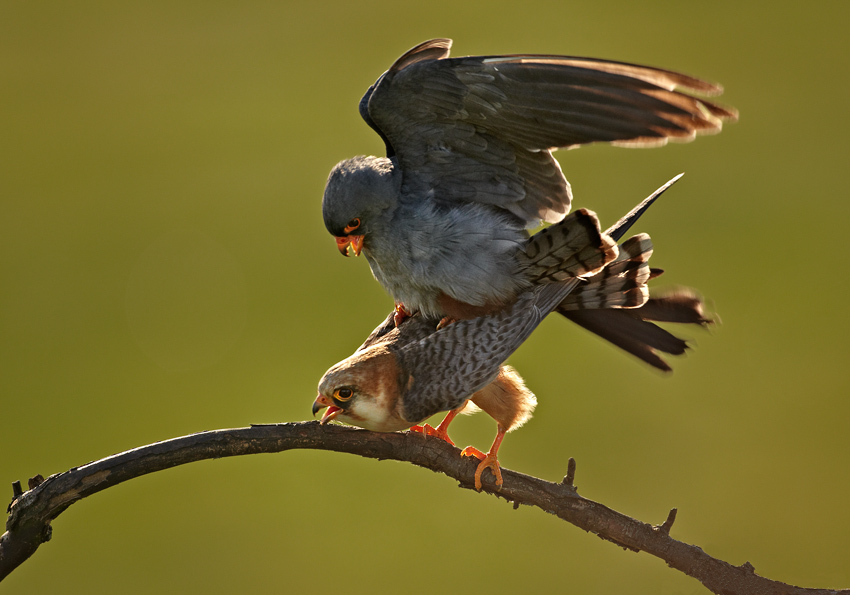
Pair mating

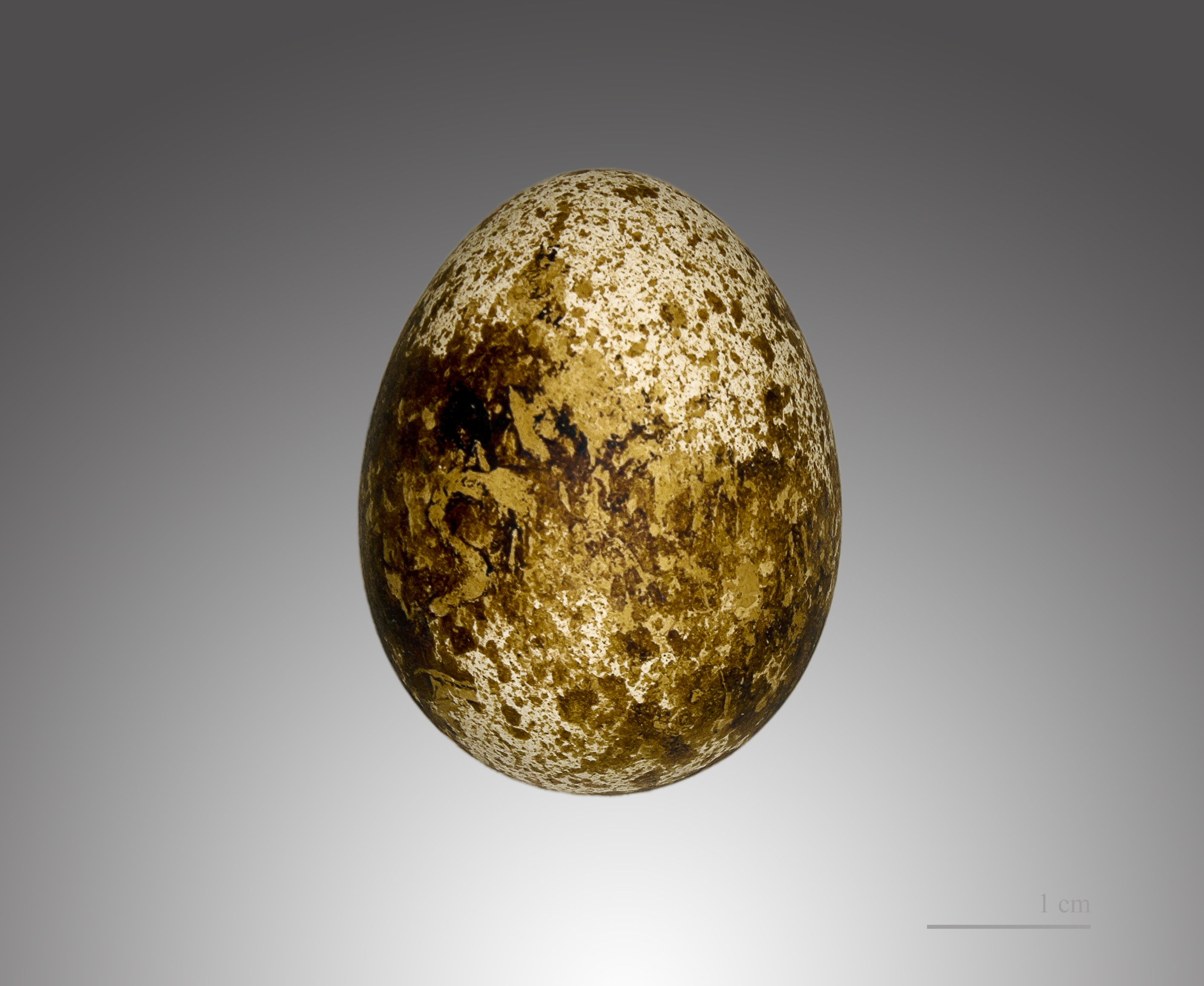
Falco vespertinus egg – Toulouse Museum, France

This falcon is a colonial breeder, reusing the old nests of corvids, such as rooks. It lays two to four eggs. Its maximum lifespan is 13.25 years in the wild and 18 years in captivity.

=== Azerbaijan ===
Red-footed falcons were witnessed copulating several times over a week-long period and "showed a strong preference for an old magpie nest" Frequent copulation was interspersed with joint inspections of the magpie nest. The morning after the aforementioned observations, the pair was again observed and they repeated their behaviour. Both then defended against an attack by a lesser kestrel. On this day neither bird spent much time in the nest, but always remained perched beside it. At the end of the week the researchers revisited the nest. The behaviour this time was that the female sat in the nest and the male perched outside but in the same tree. Further defensive responses to lesser kestrels were observed. The male red-footed falcon hunted for large insects and fed them to the female. Copulation then occurred. After copulation, the female returned to sit in the nest until the male fed her again. This behaviour continued for several days. This pair clearly showed territorial behaviour. The frequent copulations and lengthy stay of the female in the nest suggested incubation but the researchers did not check the nest.

=== Carpathian Basin ===
Researchers used a species distribution model for red-footed falcons. This model can play a crucial role in identifying key nesting sites for endangered species. According to the researchers, the red-footed falcon is officially listed as near-threatened, due to the drastic breeding population decline of the past decades. Red-footed falcons breed in colonies and in solitary pairs. They do not build a nest. In Hungary, the landscape scale distribution of rookeries remained stable, while the density and size of rookeries decreased and their location shifted to human settlements. Similar patterns were reported from other European countries. The reasons of rookery declines can be attributed to a large-scale persecution in the mid-80s resulting in a 90% population crash. Because of this, most potential breeding colonies for red-footed falcons disappeared, causing a decline in the number of breeding pairs. Conservation projects have established artificial nest box colonies to rectify this problem.

There is little evidence of this plan's effectiveness and also little evidence on recent population trends and distribution, from Northern Serbia, where 5–10% of the total European Union population is thought to breed. The researchers' main focus was on understanding the relationship between landscape scale habitat variables and red-footed falcon presence. The researchers found that the increase of natural grasslands had a positive effect on nest site presence while the increase of broad-leaved forests negatively influenced the probability of nest site presence. Their modelling approach proved successful in describing the landscape scale habitat composition of red-footed falcon breeding sites in the modelling area. Natural grasslands have a considerable impact on the probability of nest site presence. Therefore, locating their breeding sites or creating breeding sites by providing artificial colonies with the aid of our results has additional conservation and socio-economic benefits for wildlife and human population.

=== Serbia ===
Near the village of Melenci (Vojvodina, northern Serbia) there were 22 red-footed falcon nests in 1991 in which offspring had been successfully brought up. The contents of four nests were checked daily from the start of incubation until the fledglings left the nests. Breeding success did not differ between the group of four nests disturbed by inspections and the remaining 18. Despite the fact that the ratio of parent bird presence (both, only female, only male) and absence differed in the comparison of the four nests, red-footed falcon parents were usually found in the close surroundings, i.e. they attended their nest. The attendance of the birds to the nests differed between the sexes during incubation as well as hatching and the nestling period, which fact can be interpreted as a difference between the roles of females and males. In 59% of the cases it was the female, while in 41% it was the male bird that was sitting on the eggs. At the time of hatching it was mostly the female (female 86%, male 14%) that was present in the nest, while after hatching it was only the female. Later on the adult birds usually took off from the branch supporting the nest, from neighbouring trees, or from abandoned rook (Corvus frugilegus) nests, rather than from the nest itself. Females participated more times in the defence of the nest than males, yet the ratios of the studied types of behaviour (alarm, repellence, attack) did not differ between the sexes. However, significant difference appeared to be present between four nests when the distribution frequency of the three behaviour types was looked at. The distribution of the reaction types of the parent birds to disturbance was significantly different in the periods of incubation, hatching and nestling, respectively. As nesting proceeded and parental investment grew, the number of repellences and attacks increased proportionally.

The survey of population size and distribution of red-footed falcons proceeded in June–July 2000 and 2001 respectively, ten years after the first census (1990 and 1991). Data of only those nests were processed in which there was breeding. Breeding Success was calculated from the number of offspring per reproductive female. During the survey in Voivodina in 1990–1991 there were 308 and 124 pairs, respectively, whereas ten years later, in the year 2000 there were 116, and in 2001 only 61 pairs of red-footed falcons. Even if the marked fluctuations observed are not considered, the red-footed falcon population breeding in Voivodina shows a declining tendency. The south-western margin of the distribution area has moved towards the northeast by about 50–70 kilometres. More than 90% of the nesting sites, including the larger nesting colonies, are found in the Banat region, i.e. east of the Tisa River. More than 90% of the red-footed falcons continue to nest in rook colonies. No significant change has occurred in their breeding success.

== Dietary habits ==
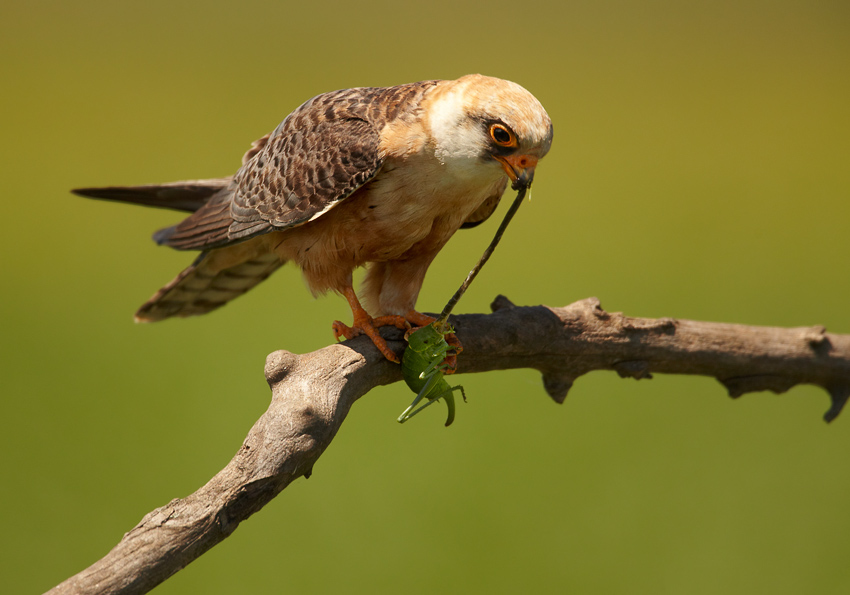
Adult female eating an insect

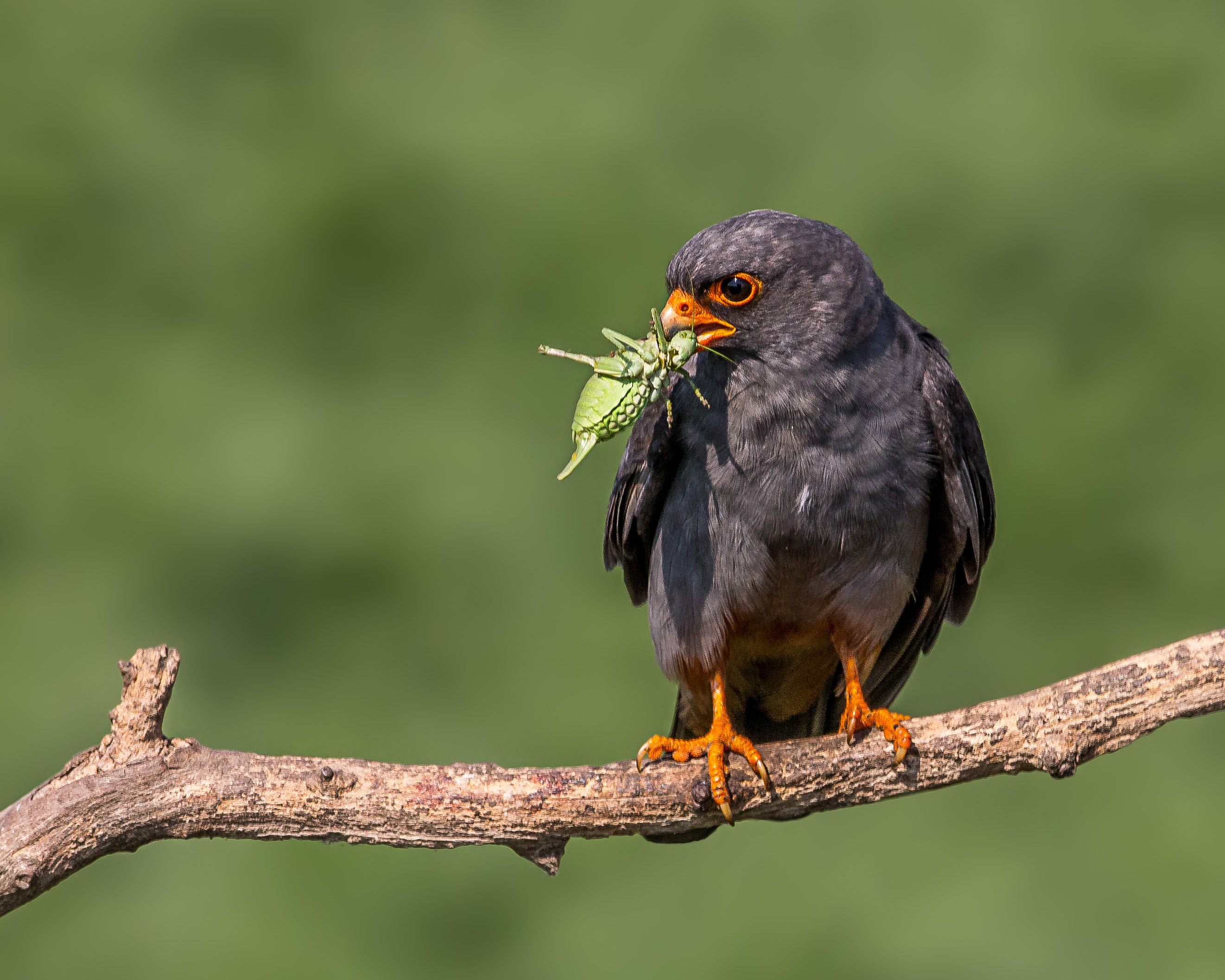
Adult male eating an insect

The red-footed falcon is a bird of prey with a diet consisting of a variety of insects, amphibians, reptiles, mammals and birds, such as great green bush-crickets, spadefoot toads, sand lizards, the common vole and bird nestlings, respectively. This bird's distinctive method of hunting is shared by the common kestrel. It regularly hovers, searching the ground below, then makes a short steep dive towards the target. When feeding their nestlings, the youngest nestlings receive the most food more frequently and more regularly. Chicks that are between 0 and 3 weeks old will get fed bigger prey like toads, lizards, bird nestlings, and great green bush-crickets, while nestlings over that age will get fed less frequently and with less variety. The diet of young nestlings consists mostly of Orthoptera and beetles with some vertebrates, while the diet of older nestlings mostly consists of Orthoptera and almost never of vertebrates.

== Habitat ==
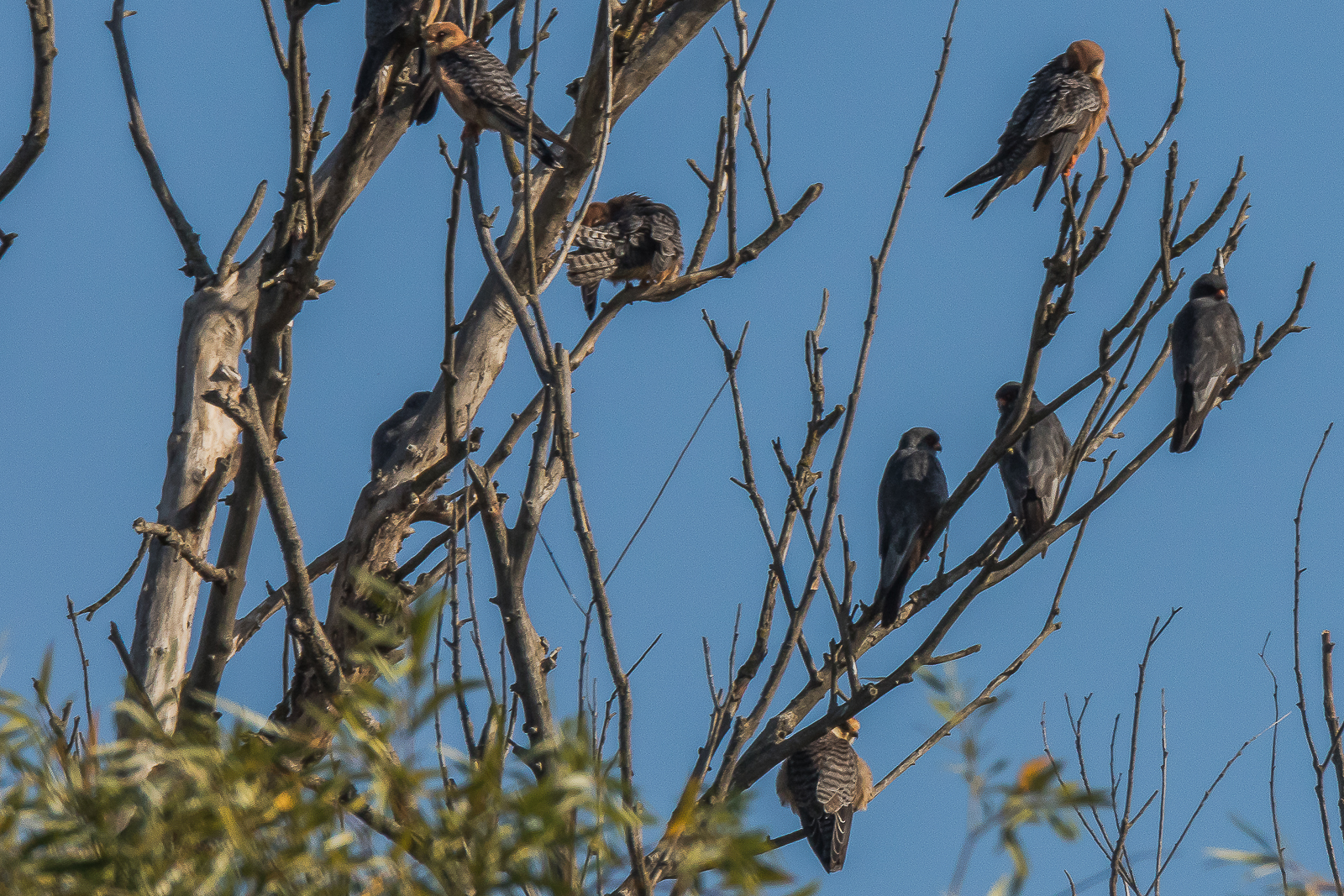
A colony of red-footed falcons

The red-footed falcon tends to reside in typical steppe type habitats ranging from Eastern Europe to Lake Baikal in Central Asia. This is a diurnal bird of open country with some trees, often near water. They tend to migrate far south for the winter, including in areas of Africa. The red-footed falcon tends not to make their own nests, but tend to use abandoned nests made by other birds such as the hooded crow, rook, and magpie. The nests that are chosen tend to be higher than the majority of the other nests; the nests tend to be 13–20 m (43–66 ft) above the ground and within 3–4 m (9.8–13.1 ft) of the tree top. Most of these nests tend to be near the edge of woods, avoiding nesting on solitary trees. Breeding takes place in these abandoned nests; usually breeding occurs colonially in rookeries because these birds tend to stay together in groups. This is also important because fledging success tends to be higher when these birds are in colonies and are not solitary. The red-footed falcon relies on the nests built by rooks, and with a decline in population of rooks, the number of suitable rookeries for colonial nesting has also decreased, leading humans to ideas of conservation.

== Threats ==
A major impact on the red footed falcon's population is loss and degradation of natural nest sites. Rooks and rookeries are regularly attacked, by shooting into the nests, killing birds and cutting down the trees they were living in for the wood. Pesticides are also a huge threat as they are depleting their natural food sources, making food competitive. There is also an increased mortality caused by electrocution due to the bird's habit of sitting perched on power lines. From 1980 to 1999 intensive poisoning of rooks in Hungary forced the species to change its nest site selection habits, and large colonies have nearly disappeared there as a result, with only 38% of the population breeding colonially. As productivity is generally greater in larger colonies, further decreases may occur. The species appears to be hunted opportunistically during migration.

== Conservation ==
The global population of red-footed falcon is estimated to be between 300,000-800,000 individuals, with 26,000 to 39,000 pairs in Europe. Most of the population breeds in the steppe grasslands of Russia and central Asia, although a significant amount also breeds in Ukraine, Romania and Hungary. In 2005, the population in Hungary was estimated to be between 700 and 800, showing a steady decline. Red-footed falcons can be considered as a classic umbrella species because they affect other species living in the community. They play a popular role in the Natura 2000 designation process. Therefore, locating their breeding sites or creating breeding sites by providing artificial colonies has additional conservation and socio-economic benefits for both wildlife and the local human population.

=== Conservation in the Pannonian Region ===
A conservation program, which was funded by the EU's LIFE Nature financial instrument, was initiated on January 1, 2006 with the goal of increasing and maintaining the breeding population of the species in Hungary and western Romania. This conservation project developed a method to create more nesting sites by creating artificial nest box colonies. It's pretty common for the birds to be preyed upon by martens or other mammalian predators during incubation or during the nestling state, even in the artificial colonies. Some extreme cases show that the predators may threaten the existence of every clutch in the colony. They are using many methods to repel or trap potential predators in order to avoid predation. Some of those methods are listed in this section. There are many known threatening factors and the program takes active conservation measures against them. Some of these factors include being electrocuted by electric pylons so the program locates and insulates the exposed cables. Roadside trees are a common nesting site for falcons because they are also home to corvids. Previously, only safety aspects were considered in the management of these nesting facilities. Therefore, the project will submit a conservation based management plan to the correct authorities. One of the reasons of red-footed falcon decline is the collapse of the rook population due to drastic pest control measures. Based on previous experience and information from stakeholders, a draft "corvus management plan" will be prepared to handle the conflict situations caused by rooks.

Future conservation efforts proposed include continuing to conduct regular surveys throughout the area. Figuring out additional ways to help the species is crucial. Red-footed falcons are known to use artificial colonies, therefore, they can be a useful mid-term conservation tool to prevent their population from fragmenting. Also, there may be ways to help out the species by changing farming and land-use practices in Central Europe. Surveys in Bulgaria indicated that there is a decline in available breeding sites for the birds.
