= Shekar Dattatri =

Indian herpetologist and wildlife filmmaker

Shekar Dattatri is an Indian herpetologist and wildlife filmmaker from Chennai, Tamil Nadu. Shekar Dattatri is a winner of three National Film Awards: the National Film Award for Best Agricultural Film (Seeds of Hope, 1988); the National Film Award for Best Cinematography – Non-Feature (Silent Valley – An Indian Rainforest, 1991); and the National Film Award for Best Scientific Film (A Cooperative for Snake Catchers, 1987).

== Career ==
Shekar Dattatri's lifelong fascination with wildlife began at the age of 14, when he joined the famous Madras Snake Park as a student-volunteer. This led to nature photography and, subsequently, to filmmaking. He also was among the discoverers of the snake species Oligodon nikhili.

== Publications ==
- Whitaker, Romulus; Dattatri, Shekar (1982). "A new species of Oligodon from the Palni Hills, South India (Serpentes: Colubridae)". Journal of the Bombay Natural History Society 79 (3): 630-631).

== Filmography ==
- The Truth About Tigers
- A cooperative for Snake Catchers
- Silent Valley - An Indian Rainforest (1990)
- Mindless Mining - The Tragedy of Kudremukh
