= Sesino Yhoshü =

Indian Naga-language film director

- Born: Kohima, Nagaland, India
- Occupation: Film director
- Father: Vikho-o Yhoshü

Sesino Yhoshü is an Indian film director from Nagaland. In 2018, Yhoshü's documentary film The Pangti Story won the Best Environment Film at the 65th National Film Awards.

== Biography ==
Sesino Yhoshü was born in Kohima, Nagaland in a Naga family. She is the daughter of Vikho-o Yhoshü from Kigwema village of Kohima District.

In 2017, Yhoshü's The Pangti Story won the Golden Beaver Award at the 7th National Science Film Festival. In 2018, the film was also adjudged the Best Environment Film including Best Agricultural Film in the non-feature category at the 65th National Film Awards.

== Selected filmography ==
- Apfütsa – director
- Story of a House – director
- The Pangti Story (2016) – director
