= Medo Yhokha =

Indian politician (born 1977)

Member of Nagaland Legislative Assembly
- Incumbent
- Assumed office 3 November 2020
- Preceded by: Vikho-o Yhoshü
- Constituency: Southern Angami-I

Personal details
- Born: 16 May 1977 (age 49) Kigwema, Kohima district
- Education: Tetso College, St. Edmund's College, Shillong and North-Eastern Hill University

Medo Yhokha is an Indian politician who is serving as Member of Nagaland Legislative Assembly from Southern Angami-I Assembly constituency. In November 2020, he was named Advisor to the Chief Minister of Nagaland.

== Personal life ==
He was born on 16 May 1977 in Kigwema, Kohima district. He did his university education at Tetso College in 1966, Bachelor of Arts in history at St. Edmund's College, Shillong and Master of Arts in history at North-Eastern Hill University.
