= Shores of Silence =

- Directed by: Mike Pandey
- Produced by: Mike Pandey
- Production company: Riverbanks Studios
- Release date: 2000
- Country: India

Shores of Silence: Whale Sharks in India is a landmark film by Mike Pandey that brought about major legislative changes to protect whale sharks worldwide. This documentary depicts the needless killing and harvesting of whale sharks by poor Indian communities. In response to the film, the Indian government introduced legislature to ban fishing of whale sharks, declaring them endangered species and protecting them under the Wildlife Protection Act of 1972. This gives whale sharks equal status to other endangered species such as tigers and rhinoceroses. Internationally, the film helped to bring the whale shark global protection under CITES. The film won 11 international awards including The Wildscreen Panda, also known as the Green Oscar. Recently, the film received four stars from the Hindustan Times.
