= The Pangti Story =

- Promotional poster
- Directed by: Sesino Yhoshü
- Produced by: Rajiv Mehrotra
- Cinematography: Megotsolie Dolie
- Edited by: Neithonuo Tüngoe
- Music by: Jonathan Lushai
- Release date: February 2017 (National Science Film Festival)
- Running time: 26 minutes
- Country: India
- Languages: English, Lotha, Nagamese

The Pangti Story is a 2017 Naga documentary film by Kohima-based film maker Sesino Yhoshü. The film explores the transition of an entire village from one that slaughtered thousands of Amur Falcons, the longest travelling raptors in the world, which fly from Siberia every fall to roost in Pangti, a Lotha Naga village in Nagaland, to becoming their most fervent preservationists. The film won the 65th National Film Awards for Best Environment Film.

== Production ==
Production began in 2015, with the TAKE ONE production team making two trips to Pangti village in Wokha District, Nagaland. Footage of the birds was taken on the first trip, along with initial ground research. The second trip involved additional filming in Pangti, Wokha, and Dimapur.

== Accolades ==
The film won the Golden Beaver Award at the 7th National Science Film Festival held in 2017. In 2018, the film was adjudged the Best Environment Film including Best Agricultural Film in the non-feature category at the 65th National Film Awards held in 2017.

== See also ==
- Amur Falcon
