= Riverbank Studios =

- Industry: Television
- Founded: 1973
- Founder: Mike Pandey
- Headquarters: New Delhi, India
- Key people: Mike Pandey, Gautam Pandey, Doel Trivedi
- Website: http://www.riverbankstudios.com/

Riverbank Studios is an independent film production company based in India and founded by the filmmaker and conservationist, Mike Pandey.

== History ==
Founded in 1973 by Mike Pandey in New Delhi, Riverbank Studios was among the first film studios in North India. The studio has produced numerous feature films, advertisements, and television series, both filming on location and handling post-production. Over the years, the studio has focused on creating wildlife films that promote conservation and raising awareness.

The studio produces television series, wildlife films and has recently ventured to online content, producing their first 360-degree film on a Nature Reserve in India. In 2017, they produced two films which were broadcast on Animal Planet India - Looking for Sultan and Gyamo - Queen of the Mountains. Both films received strong positive review and were aired on both Animal Planet and Discovery India.

== Television ==
- Ghar Ka Chirag
- Khullam Khulla - Kids TV
- Ghoomo TVC

== Award winning films ==
The Last Migration

- Wildscreen Festival, Bristol, UK – 1994
- Spirit Of Wilderness, Santa Fe, New Mexico, USA – 1994
- Care For Nature Award, International World Wildlife Fund, Bangalore, India.
- Special Jury Award, International Video Festival (IVFest), Trivandrum – 1995
- We The People, South Africa.

Shores of Silence

- Wildscreen Festival, Bristol
- The Citta Di Toronto at the Cinemambiente Award - 2001
- The 6th Sichuan TV Festival, China - 2001
- The Honour of Knowledge Award at Bratislava, Slovakia - 2001
- The Golden Jury Award, Worldfest, Houston- 2002
- The Rolls-Royce, Commonwealth Broadcasting Award, UK- 2002
- Ecofilm, Award in the Category of Documentary, Oct 2002
- Ministry of the Environment of the Czech Republic Award, Nov 2002
- Wildlife trust of India, Endangered Species Award, 2002
- Vatavaran 2003 Prithvi Ratan Award for Outstanding Achievement in Global Conservation, November 2003
- National Award for Best Adventure & Exploration Film, 2005

Vanishing Giants

- Wildscreen Festival, Bristol

Timeless Traveller

- Vatavaran Festival
- International Wildlife Film Festival in Albert

Earth Matters

- Golden Giraffe for conservation" International Wildlife Film Festival in Albert

== Filmography ==
Title	Client / Broadcast Channel	Year of Production	Notes
North East Explorer	Arunprabha - Doordarshan	In Pre Production	
Jabarkhet | The forest that came back	Self Produced/ Jabarkhet Nature Reserve	In Production	Copyright Riverbank Studios
Ecology that Sustains the Tiger	Films Division of India	In Production	
Seva Mandir	NGO - Seva Mandir	In Production	
Looking for Sultan	Self Produced/ Animal Planet India	2017	Copyright Riverbank Studios
Gyamo - Queen of the Mountains	Self Produced/ Animal Planet India	2017	Copyright Riverbank Studios
Soil Health Card	Prime Minister's Office and Prasar Bharati	2017	
Flood Insurance	International Water Management Institute	2017	
Learn to Help	EduMedia School Cinema	2016	
High Altitude Lakes	Forest Dept. Himachal Pradesh	2015	
Forests - Securing the Future	Forest-PLUS, Tetra Tech, USAID & MoEFCC	2015	
The Western Tragopan - The King of Birds	Forest Dept. Himachal Pradesh	2015	
Gaddis	Forest Dept. Himachal Pradesh	2015	
Teen Safety	EduMedia School Cinema	2015	
Maruti Suzuki Recruitment	Maruti Suzuki	2015	
Just Climate Action	Ministry of Environment and Climate Change	2015	
Touching the lives of Millions	NTPC	2015	
Pong Dam - Avian Paradise	Forest Dept. Himachal Pradesh	2014	
Arts & Crafts of Rajasthan	Department of Tourism Rajasthan	2013	
Lesser Known Destinations of Rajasthan	Department of Tourism Rajasthan	2013	
Ghoomo - TVC	Department of Tourism Rajasthan	2012	
Broken Wings	Self Produced	2012	Copyright Riverbank Studios
Global Tiger Initiative	World Bank	2012	
Rescued by You	EduMedia School Cinema	2012	
The Water Energy Nexus	USAID	2011	
Mangroves - Guardians of the Coast	IUCN	2011	
Disaster Management	International Federation of Red Cross	2009	
Ghar ka Chirag TV Series	Doordarshan National	2006 - 2009	India Broadcast Right Riverbank Studios
Kurumbas - Children of the Blue Mountains	Self Produced	2005	Copyright Riverbank Studios
Vanishing Giants	Self Produced	2004	Copyright Riverbank Studios
Shores of Silence	Self Produced	2004	Copyright Riverbank Studios
Timeless Traveller	Self Produced	2003	Copyright Riverbank Studios
Earth Matters TV Series	Doordarshan National	1999 - 2014	
The Last Migration	Self Produced	1994	Copyright Riverbank Studios
