= Gazab =

Gazab گزاب
- Village
- Interactive map of Gazab
- Country: Iran
- Province: Sistan and Baluchestan
- County: Konarak
- Bakhsh: Zarabad
- Rural District: Zarabad-e Gharbi

Population (2006)
  - Total: 66
- Time zone: UTC+3:30 (IRST)
  - Summer (DST): UTC+4:30 (IRDT)

Gazab (Persian: گزاب, also Romanized as Gazāb) is a village in Zarabad-e Gharbi Rural District, Zarabad District, Konarak County, Sistan and Baluchestan Province, Iran. At the 2006 census, its population was 66, in 17 families.
