= Krishnendu Bose =

Indian film director

- Born: West Bengal, India
- Education: University of Delhi
- Occupations: Conservationist; documentary filmmaker; environmental journalist
- Years active: 2006–present

Krishnendu Bose is an Indian filmmaker known for his work on wildlife conservation and environmental justice.

== Early life and education ==
Bose completed his master's degree in economics from the Delhi School of Economics in 1985. During his college years, his early environmental perspective was shaped by his involvement with Kalpavriksh, a student environmental action group at the University of Delhi.

== Career ==
Broaded the narrative on human-wildlife conflict and wild tiger terrains, his 2016 film The Tiger Who Crossed the Line won the National Film Award for Best Non-Feature Environment/Conservation/Preservation Film at the 64th National Film Awards. His 2023 film, Bay of Blood is a historical documentary recounting the environmental and human impact of the 1971 Bangladesh Liberation War.
