= Nandan Saxena =

Indian documentarian

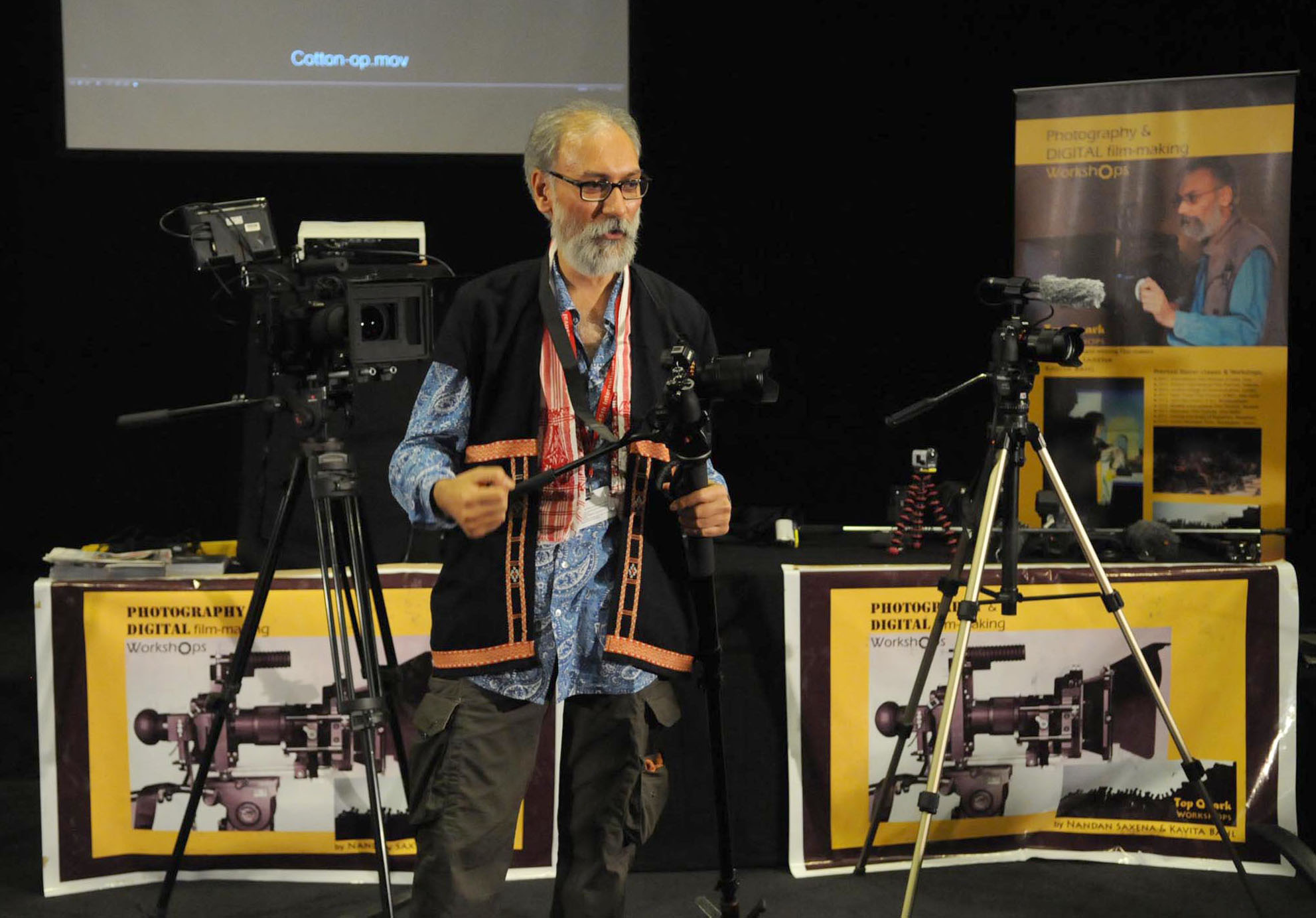
- Saxena, IFFI 2014
- Citizenship: India
- Education: Journalism
- Occupations: Filmmaker, journalist
- Spouse: Kavita Bahl
- Awards: 3 National Film Awards

Nandan Saxena is a multi National Film Award winning Indian documentary filmmaker. He has won National film Awards thrice.

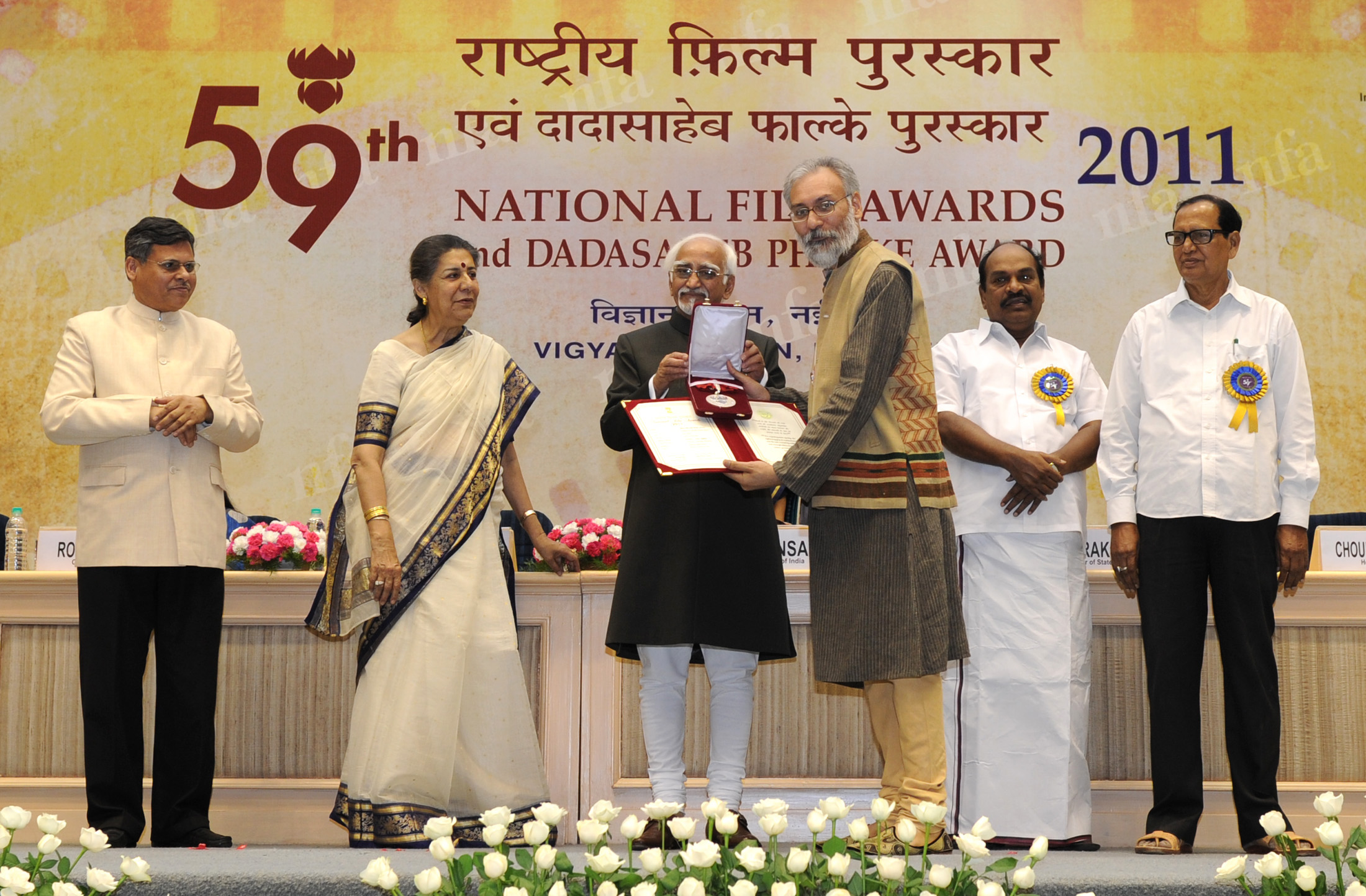
Saxena receiving Rajat Kamal award from 12th Vice President of India, Mohammad Hamid Ansari, at National Film Awards (2011), held in 2012

== Awards ==
Year	Award(s)	Category	Film	Result	Ref(s).
2014	National Film Awards	Best Environment Film Including Agriculture	I Cannot Give You My Forest	Won	
2013	National Film Awards	Special Mention	Candles In The Wind	Won	
2011	National Film Awards	Best Investigative Film	Cotton for My Shroud	Won	

== Selected filmography ==
- I Cannot Give You My Forest (2014)
- Cotton for My Shroud (2011)
- Candles In The Wind (2013)
- Wings
- A stitch in time

== Personal life ==
Saxena's parents were teachers. He studied journalism. He is married to Kavita Bahl, an Indian filmmaker. The couple quit journalism on returning to Delhi in 1996 and took on film-making.
