= 42nd National Film Awards =

1995 Indian film award

- Awarded for: Best of Indian cinema in 1994
- Awarded by: Directorate of Film Festivals
- Presented by: Shankar Dayal Sharma (President of India)
- Announced on: 2 June 1995
- Presented on: 17 July 1995
- Site: Vigyan Bhawan, New Delhi
- Official website: dff.nic.in

Highlights
- Best Feature Film: Unishe April
- Best Non-Feature Film: Rasayatra
- Best Book: Abhinayam Anubhavam
- Best Film Critic: Rashmi Doraiswamy
- Dadasaheb Phalke Award: Dilip Kumar
- Most awards: • Kaadhalan • Parinayam (4)

The 42nd National Film Awards, presented by Directorate of Film Festivals, the organisation set up by Ministry of Information and Broadcasting, India to felicitate the best of Indian Cinema released in the year 1994. Ceremony took place in 1995 and awards were given by then President of India, Shankar Dayal Sharma.

== Awards ==
Awards were divided into feature films, non-feature films and books written on Indian cinema.

=== Lifetime Achievement Award ===
Name of Award	Image	Awardee(s)	Awarded As	Awards
Dadasaheb Phalke Award		Dilip Kumar	Actor	Swarna Kamal, ₹ 100,000 and a Shawl

=== Feature films ===
Feature films were awarded at All India as well as regional level. For 42nd National Film Awards, a Bengali film, Unishe April won the National Film Award for Best Feature Film whereas a Tamil film, Kaadhalan and a Malayalam film, Parinayam won the maximum number of awards (4). Following were the awards given in each category:

==== All India Award ====
Following were the awards given:

===== Golden Lotus Award =====
Official Name: Swarna Kamal

All the awardees are awarded with "Golden Lotus Award (Swarna Kamal)", a certificate and cash prize.

Name of Award	Name of Film	Language	Awardee(s)	Cash prize
Best Feature Film	Unishe April	Bengali	Producer: Renu Roy	₹ 50,000/-
Best Feature Film	Unishe April	Bengali	Director: Rituparno Ghosh	₹ 25,000/-
Best Feature Film	Citation: For a complex and impeccable rendition of fragmenting family relationships in urban India. The bond between a mother and daughter is extended to a defined space and time, and a drama immaculately constructed.			
Best Debut Film of A Director	Mogha Mull	Tamil	Producer: J. Dharmambal; Director: Gnana Rajasekaran	₹ 25,000/- Each
Best Debut Film of A Director	Citation: For an able translation of a literary work of art, for integrating music with melodramatic narrative and for a cinematic simplicity matched with remarkable directorial control.			
Best Popular Film Providing Wholesome Entertainment	Hum Aapke Hain Koun..!	Hindi	Producer: Rajshri Productions	₹ 40,000/-
Best Popular Film Providing Wholesome Entertainment	Hum Aapke Hain Koun..!	Hindi	Director: Sooraj R. Barjatya	₹ 20,000/-
Best Popular Film Providing Wholesome Entertainment	Citation: For revolutionising mass entertainment in India with a family entertainer and a fantasy film that succeeds without recourse to familiar narrative idioms of violence.			
Best Children's Film	Kochaniyan	Malayalam	Producer: Bushura Shahudeen	₹ 30,000/-
Best Children's Film	Kochaniyan	Malayalam	Director: Sathieesh Vengannoor	₹ 15,000/-
Best Children's Film	Citation: For a simple but effective tale of a middle class Kerala family told through the experiences and dreams of a young boy.			
Best Children's Film	Abhay	Hindi	Producer: National Center of Films for Children and Young People	₹ 30,000/-
Best Children's Film	Abhay	Hindi	Director: Annu Kapoor	₹ 15,000/-
Best Children's Film	Citation: For an entertaining film advocating humane love between a child and a ghost advocating a rational outlook to life.			
Best Direction	Xagoroloi Bohudoor	Assamese	Jahnu Barua	₹ 50,000/-
Best Direction	Citation: For capturing Assamese life and reality in an original format uniquely associated with the director, and for enriching the spectrum of Indian Cinema thereby.			

===== Silver Lotus Award =====
Official Name: Rajat Kamal

All the awardees are awarded with "Silver Lotus Award (Rajat Kamal)", a certificate and cash prize.

Name of Award	Name of Film	Language	Awardee(s)	Cash prize
Best Feature Film on National Integration	Mukta	Marathi	Producer: Ashok B. Mhatre	₹ 30,000/-
Best Feature Film on National Integration	Mukta	Marathi	Director: Jabbar Patel	₹ 15,000/-
Best Feature Film on National Integration	Citation: For mapping a sharply defined dramatic style on to a canvas of national caste oppression and for unversalising the alliances of the Indian Dalit people.			
Best Film on Family Welfare	Karuththamma	Tamil	Producer: Vetrivel Art Creations	₹ 30,000/-
Best Film on Family Welfare	Karuththamma	Tamil	Director: Bharathiraja	₹ 15,000/-
Best Film on Family Welfare	Citation: For extending the pressing social issue of female infanticide onto a melodrama spanning the canvas of rural Tamil Nadu, a dimension that is now uniquely Bharathiraja signature.			
Best Film on Other Social Issues	Parinayam	Malayalam	Producer: G. P. Vijayakumar	₹ 30,000/-
Best Film on Other Social Issues	Parinayam	Malayalam	Director: Hariharan	₹ 15,000/-
Best Film on Other Social Issues	Citation: For recreating a real incident in the social history of Kerala, thereby indicating the continued relevance of gender oppression in traditional caste-dominated society.			
Best Film on Other Social Issues	Wheelchair	Bengali	Producer: NFDC	₹ 30,000/-
Best Film on Other Social Issues	Wheelchair	Bengali	Director: Tapan Sinha	₹ 15,000/-
Best Film on Other Social Issues	Citation: For a positive rendition of the condition of handicapped people suggesting affirmative action.			
Best Film on Environment / Conservation / Preservation	Nirbachana	Oriya	Producer: NFDC and Doordarshan	₹ 30,000/-
Best Film on Environment / Conservation / Preservation	Nirbachana	Oriya	Director: Biplab Ray Chowdhury	₹ 15,000/-
Best Film on Environment / Conservation / Preservation	Citation: For a stunningly controlled and uniquely cinematic metaphor of rural India and impending environment catastrophe shown with compassion and satire.			
Best Actor	Krantiveer	Hindi	Nana Patekar	₹ 10,000/-
Best Actor	Citation: For his impressive portrayal of a man who lives on his own terms. He is able to rekindle in the common man the deep, hidden resource of strength that lies dormant in each one of us.			
Best Actress	Unishe April	Bengali	Debashree Roy	₹ 10,000/-
Best Actress	Citation: For her complete identification with character of lonely doctor. The wide range of emotion is portrayed in a most sensitive and controlled manner in this film.			
Best Supporting Actor	Drohkaal	Hindi	Ashish Vidyarthi	₹ 10,000/- Each
Best Supporting Actor	Citation: For bringing credibility to his role with strength and total conviction.			₹ 10,000/- Each
Best Supporting Actor	Nammavar	Tamil	Nagesh	₹ 10,000/- Each
Best Supporting Actor	Citation: For making heart break of a broken father come alive with dignity and poise.			₹ 10,000/- Each
Best Supporting Actress	Mammo	Hindi	Surekha Sikri	₹ 10,000/-
Best Supporting Actress	Citation: For her portrayal of surrogate mother, underplayed with quite sensitivity and gentleness.			
Best Child Artist	Kotreshi Kanasu	Kannada	Vijay Raghavendra	₹ 10,000/-
Best Child Artist	Citation: For his portrayal of bright little boy who is a social outcast. He wins your heart with his soft and endearing mannerisms.			
Best Male Playback Singer	• Kaadhalan ("Ennavale Adi Ennavale") • Pavithra ("Uyirum Neeye")	Tamil	P. Unni Krishnan	₹ 10,000/-
Best Male Playback Singer	Citation: For his range and masterly rendition of the songs of two Tamil films, demonstrating a rare professionalism and command over technique.			
Best Female Playback Singer	Karuththamma ("Porale Ponnuthaaye")	Tamil	Swarnalatha	₹ 10,000/-
Best Female Playback Singer	Citation: For her extraordinarily compassionate song upon which much of the crucial dramatic action in the film is enacted.			
Best Cinematography	Thenmavin Kombath	Malayalam	Cameraman: K. V. Anand; Laboratory Processing: Gemini Color Lab, Madras	₹ 15,000/-
Best Cinematography	Citation: In recognition of the outstanding cinematography executed with sincerity, imagination and flexibility. Fluid camera movements, praise compositions, and use of light are the highlights of this visual experience.			
Best Screenplay	Parinayam	Malayalam	M. T. Vasudevan Nair	₹ 10,000/-
Best Screenplay	Citation: For his masterly use of fiction in cinema, reconstructing pre-1940s Kerala through sharply defined characters and remarkable control over dialogue.			
Best Audiography	Kaadhalan	Tamil	• A. S. Laxmi Narayanan • V. S. Murthy	₹ 10,000/-
Best Audiography	Citation: For combining numerous effects in multiple tracks and an often dazzling array of music, sound and dialogue with remarkable technical control.			
Best Editing	Kaadhalan	Tamil	• B. Lenin • V. T. Vijayan	₹ 10,000/-
Best Editing	Citation: For the sheer magic of an editing idiom, cut to perfect timing event at a breath taking pace, in sequences that often make the implausible a plausibility.			
Best Art Direction	Thenmavin Kombath	Malayalam	Sabu Cyril	₹ 10,000/-
Best Art Direction	Citation: For creating an appropriate space for a romantic fantasy in cinema-scope in tandem with the cinematography.			
Best Costume Design	Amodini	Bengali	Supriya Dasgupta	₹ 10,000/-
Best Costume Design	Citation: For an aesthetic recreation of 18th century costumes, evoking the traditions of Bengali painting and theatre.			
Best Music Direction	• Parinayam • Sukrutham	Malayalam	Ravi (Bombay)	₹ 10,000/- Each
Best Music Direction	Citation: For his melodious rendering of his tunes. The music in both the films exhibit originality and creatively highlights the entire mood of the two films, achieving musical harmony			₹ 10,000/- Each
Best Music Direction	Sukrutham	Malayalam	Johnson	₹ 10,000/- Each
Best Music Direction	Citation: For scoring the background music.			₹ 10,000/- Each
Best Lyrics	• Karuththamma ("Poralae Ponnuthayi") • Pavithra ("Uyirum Neeye")	Tamil	Vairamuthu	₹ 10,000/-
Best Lyrics	Citation: Through their lyrics, he is able to bring to the fore his rich repertory of poetic expression which sensitively enhances the mood of the films.			
Best Special Effects	Kaadhalan	Tamil	• C. Murugesh • S. T. Venki	₹ 10,000/-
Best Special Effects	Citation: In recognition of many spectacular sequences creatively engineered.			
Best Choreography	Hum Aapke Hain Koun..!	Hindi	Jay Borade	₹ 10,000/-
Best Choreography	Citation: For her graceful and aesthetically pleasing choreography, contemporary and yet traditional in its adherence to Indian cultural practices.			
Special Jury Award	Param Vir Chakra	Hindi	Radhu Karmakar (Posthumously) (Cinematographer)	₹ 25,000/- Each
Special Jury Award	Citation: In appreciation of a lifetime achievement in creating some of the most memorable moments in Indian film history.			₹ 25,000/- Each
Special Jury Award	Swaham	Malayalam	Shaji N. Karun (Director)	₹ 25,000/- Each
Special Jury Award	Citation: For one of the most outstanding directors of Indian cinema, for sensitively probing the vacuum created in a family, when its central pivot is lost in death.			₹ 25,000/- Each
Special Mention	Nammavar	Tamil	Mahesh Mahadevan (Music director)	Certificate Only
Special Mention	Citation: For his unusual and innovative score, using sound effects as an integral part of his musical arrangement.			Certificate Only
Special Mention	Xagoroloi Bohudoor	Assamese	Bishnu Kharghoria (Actor)	Certificate Only
Special Mention	Citation: For his poignant and memorable role for bringing alive the heartrending agony of a boatman and his grandson, who is not only deserted by his son, but also his life sustaining river – his only source of livelihood.			Certificate Only
Special Mention	Parinayam	Malayalam	S. Kumar (Cinematographer)	Certificate Only
Special Mention	Citation: For recreating and bringing to life an ambiance and characters that help lend credibility to a difficult and complex scenario. Sensitively handled and a sustained performance where the camera and lights have been used as an extension of the creative story teller.			Certificate Only

==== Regional Awards ====
The award is given to best film in the regional languages in India.

Name of Award	Name of Film	Awardee(s)	Cash prize
Best Feature Film in Assamese	Xagoroloi Bohudoor	Producer: Sailadhar Baruah and Jahnu Barua	₹ 20,000/-
Best Feature Film in Assamese	Xagoroloi Bohudoor	Director: Jahnu Barua	₹ 10,000/-
Best Feature Film in Assamese	Citation: For the filmmaker's ability to tell a complex tale with minimal canvas, handling the medium with control, restraint and extraordinary sensitivity.		
Best Feature Film in Bengali	Amodini	Producer: NFDC and Doordarshan	₹ 20,000/-
Best Feature Film in Bengali	Amodini	Director: Chidananda Dasgupta	₹ 10,000/-
Best Feature Film in Bengali	Citation: For a stylised and innovative period rendition of complex social relations in 18th century Bengal, integrating performances with camera movements and mise en scene.		
Best Feature Film in Hindi	Mammo	Producer: NFDC and Doordarshan	₹ 20,000/-
Best Feature Film in Hindi	Mammo	Director: Shyam Benegal	₹ 10,000/-
Best Feature Film in Hindi	Citation: For a poignant narrative of a family set against the trauma of exiled people in past post partition India.		
Best Feature Film in Kannada	Kotreshi Kanasu	Producer: G. Nandakumar	₹ 20,000/-
Best Feature Film in Kannada	Kotreshi Kanasu	Director: Nagathihalli Chandrashekhar	₹ 10,000/-
Best Feature Film in Kannada	Citation: For a simple but effective tale of a young harijan boy fighting cast justice in rural Karnataka.		
Best Feature Film in Malayalam	Sukrutham	Producer: M. M. Ramachandran	₹ 20,000/-
Best Feature Film in Malayalam	Sukrutham	Director: Hari Kumar	₹ 10,000/-
Best Feature Film in Malayalam	Citation: Against the backdrop of impending death, complex marital and social relationships are explored.		
Best Feature Film in Manipuri	Mayophy Gee Macha	Producer: Thouyangba and Thoungamba	₹ 20,000/-
Best Feature Film in Manipuri	Mayophy Gee Macha	Director: Oken Amakcham	₹ 10,000/-
Best Feature Film in Manipuri	Citation: For a simple story of a rural life in Manipuri handled with a deft mastery over the medium.		
Best Feature Film in Tamil	Nammavar	Producer: B. Venkatarama Reddy	₹ 20,000/-
Best Feature Film in Tamil	Nammavar	Director: K. S. Sethumadhavan	₹ 10,000/-
Best Feature Film in Tamil	Citation: For professionally assembled tale of a college professor who encounters student violence, marked by several impressive performances.		

Best Feature Film in Each of the Language Other Than Those Specified in the Schedule VIII of the Constitution

Name of Award	Name of Film	Awardee(s)	Cash prize
Best Feature Film in English	English, August	Producer: Anuradha Parikh	₹ 20,000/-
Best Feature Film in English	English, August	Director: Dev Benegal	₹ 10,000/-
Best Feature Film in English	Citation: For adapting a complex and highly applauded novel with a cinematic skill and mastery matching the original work, a translation unusual in contemporary Indian cinema.		

=== Non-Feature Films ===
Short Films made in any Indian language and certified by the Central Board of Film Certification as a documentary/newsreel/fiction are eligible for non-feature film section.

==== Golden Lotus Award ====
Official Name: Swarna Kamal

All the awardees are awarded with "Golden Lotus Award (Swarna Kamal)", a certificate and cash prize.

Name of Award	Name of Film	Language	Awardee(s)	Cash prize
Best Non-Feature Film	Rasayatra	Hindi and English	Producer: Interaction Video Communication	₹ 20,000/- Each
Best Non-Feature Film	Rasayatra	Hindi and English	Director: Nandan Kudhyadi	₹ 15,000/- Each
Best Non-Feature Film	Citation: For its sensitive and imaginative transposition of music, into a dignified cinematic expression.			

==== Silver Lotus Award ====
Official Name: Rajat Kamal

All the awardees are awarded with "Silver Lotus Award (Rajat Kamal)" and cash prize.

Name of Award	Name of Film	Language	Awardee(s)	Cash prize
Best First Non-Feature Film	A Little War	Hindi	Producer: Film and Television Institute of India; Director: Atanu Biswas	₹ 10,000/- Each
Best First Non-Feature Film	Citation: For a restrained performances that its camera elicits.			
Best Anthropological / Ethnographic Film	The Trapped	English	Producer: K. Jayachandran; Director: O. K. Johnny	₹ 10,000/- Each
Best Anthropological / Ethnographic Film	Citation: For choosing to focus on the exploitation, past and present, of a small tribe, without platitudinous sentimentality.			
Best Arts / Cultural Film	Painting in Time	English	Producer: Topshots; Director: Sarbajit Sen	₹ 10,000/- Each
Best Arts / Cultural Film	Citation: For using play of light to enter the surface of a culture, unobtrusively, allowing it to reveal its magical metaphysics.			
Best Scientific Film	Another Way of Learning	English	Producer: Comet Media Foundation; Director: Chandita Mukherjee	₹ 10,000/- Each
Best Scientific Film	Citation: For being at once precise and warm in its approach to teaching processes.			
Best Environment / Conservation / Preservation Film	Visuddha Vanangal	Malayalam	Producer: Kerala State Film Development Corporation; Director: K. R. Mohanan	₹ 10,000/- Each
Best Environment / Conservation / Preservation Film	Citation: For its analytical clarity and rigorous research in addressing a specific ecological issue.			
Best Promotional Film	Blue Flames, Green Villages	English	Producer: National Afforestation and Eco-Development Board, Ministry of Environment and Forests; Director: Ramesh Asher	₹ 10,000/- Each
Best Promotional Film	Citation: For its competent presentation of a rural project, within its given brief.			
Best Historical Reconstruction / Compilation Film	Phalke Children	English	Producer: R. Krishna Mohan and Y. N. Engineer; Director: Kamal Swaroop	₹ 10,000/- Each
Best Historical Reconstruction / Compilation Film	Citation: For the film which, while documenting the life and work of the subject, critiques the iconocising approach to history.			
Best Film on Social Issues	Father, Son and Holy War (Part I – Trial by Fire, Part II – Hero Pharmacy)	Hindi and English	Producer: Anand Patwardhan; Director: Anand Patwardhan	₹ 10,000/- Each
Best Film on Social Issues	Citation: For its conviction, courage and relentless observation, tempered by a sharp sense of irony.			
Best Educational / Motivational / Instructional Film	News Magazine No. 268 (A) Plague – Curable and Preventable	Hindi	Producer: R. Krishna Mohan; Director: Mahesh P. Sinha	₹ 10,000/- Each
Best Educational / Motivational / Instructional Film	Citation: For its simple, direct and clear communication about the threat of plague.			
Best Investigative Film	Father, Son and Holy War (Part I – Trial by Fire, Part II – Hero Pharmacy)	Hindi and English	Producer: Anand Patwardhan; Director: Anand Patwardhan	₹ 10,000/- Each
Best Investigative Film	Citation: For probing beyond the objective, in its pursuit of insights, allowing even the unexpected to suggest the oblique.			
Best Animation Film	Mahagiri	Hindi	Producer: Bhimsain; Director: Kireet; Animator: S. M. Hasan	₹ 10,000/- Each
Best Animation Film	Citation: For its playful wit, its liveliness of line and indigenous idiom.			
Best Short Fiction Film	Still Life	Hindi and English	Producer: Film and Television Institute of India; Director: Subhadro Chowdhary	₹ 10,000/- Each
Best Short Fiction Film	Citation: For its stylistic sophistication in dealing with the chaos of painful experience.			
Best Film on Family Welfare	Clint	Malayalam and English	Producer: Shiva Kumar; Director: Shiva Kumar	₹ 10,000/- Each
Best Film on Family Welfare	Citation: For setting up a new model of the essence of family welfare, through its honest documentation of factors impinging on a child's life.			
Best Cinematography	Rasayatra	Hindi and English	Cameraman: Anoop Jotwani; Laboratory Processing: Vijay Color Lab, Madras	₹ 10,000/- Each
Best Cinematography	Citation: For his fastidious interpretation through lighting, and the fluidity of his camera operation.			
Best Audiography	Another Way of Learning	English	Indrajit Neogi and A. M. Padmanabhan	₹ 10,000/-
Best Audiography	Citation: For together bringing about a quality of sound, which so enhances the acoustic, that the viewer becomes a participant.			
Best Editing	Rasayatra	Hindi and English	Paresh Kamdar	₹ 10,000/-
Best Editing	Citation: For the elegant pace with which he discovers spatial correlatives for the inherent musicality.			
Best Music Direction	The Myth to the Tree, The Serpent and the Mother	Malayalam	K. P. Udayabhanu	₹ 10,000/-
Best Music Direction	Citation: For his interesting juxtaposition of different strains of music and sound.			
Special Jury Award	Games We Played in My Youth	English	Soumitra Sarkar	₹ 10,000/-
Special Jury Award	Citation: For a refreshingly whimsical poem, which delights in the surprise of shifts and displacement.			₹ 10,000/-
Special Mention	Of Tagore and Cinema	English	Arun Kumar Roy	Certificate Only
Special Mention	Citation: In acknowledgement of its archival value.			Certificate Only
Special Mention	The Story of Integration	English	Gautam Haldar	Certificate Only
Special Mention	Citation: In acknowledgement of his painstaking attempt to bring its subject to life.			Certificate Only
Special Mention	Ormaynde Theerangalil	Malayalam	Kaviyoor Sivaprasad	Certificate Only
Special Mention	Citation: In acknowledgement of his lyrical evocation of the passage of time.			Certificate Only

=== Best Writing on Cinema ===
The awards aim at encouraging study and appreciation of cinema as an art form and dissemination of information and critical appreciation of this art-form through publication of books, articles, reviews etc.

==== Golden Lotus Award ====
Official Name: Swarna Kamal

All the awardees are awarded with "Golden Lotus Award (Swarna Kamal)" and cash prize.

Name of Award	Name of Book	Language	Awardee(s)	Cash prize
Best Book on Cinema	Abhinayam Anubhavam	Malayalam	Author: Bharath Gopi; Publisher: P. Bhuvanesan	₹ 15,000/- Each
Best Book on Cinema	Citation: For his introspective and self-analytical first person account. Abhinayam Anubhavam is serious and wistful at times, as the actor weaves and interesting picture of his interaction with cinema and his colleagues in the medium. The book is as unusual as it is revealing			
Best Film Critic		English	Rashmi Doraiswamy	₹ 15,000/-
Best Film Critic	Citation: For her perceptive and in-depth analysis of wide-ranging issues related to cinema, both in India and aboard. Her writing is not only well researched and informative but also represents a convincing point of view.			

=== Awards not given ===
Following were the awards not given as no film was found to be suitable for the award:

- Best Feature Film in Marathi
- Best Feature Film in Oriya
- Best Feature Film in Punjabi
- Best Feature Film in Telugu
- Best Non-Feature Film Direction
- Best Biographical Film
- Best Agricultural Film
- Best Exploration / Adventure Film
