= Filmfare Award for Best Documentary =

Annual award for Hindi films

The Filmfare Best Documentary Award was one of the Filmfare Awards, given by the Indian magazine Filmfare to documentary films. It was first presented in 1967, and discontinued in 1998.

== Winners and nominees ==
=== 1960s ===
- 1967 Handicrafts of Rajasthan – Clement T. Baptista
- 1968 India '67 – S.Sukhdev
- 1969 Explorer – Promod Pati

=== 1970s ===
- 1970 Then, The Rain – Ramesh Gupta
- 1971 Koodal – Mushir Ahmed
- 1972 Creations in Metal – Homi D. Sethna
- 1973 Nine Months to Freedom – S.Sukhdev
- 1974 A Day with the Builders – C.J. Paulose
- 1975 The Nomad Puppeteer – Mani Kaul
- 1976 Sarojini Naidu – B.D. Garga
- 1977 Marvel of Memory – N.K. Issar
- 1978 Transformations – Zafar Hai
- 1979 no award

=== 1980s ===
- 1980 Malfunction – Pankaj Parashar
- 1981 They Call Me Chamar – Lokesh Lalvani
- 1982 Faces After the Storm – Prakash Jha
- 1983 Experience India – Zafar Hai
- 1984 Veer Savarkar – Prem Vaidya
- 1985 Charakku – Om Prakash Sharma
- 1986 Bombay: Our City – Anand Patwardhan
- 1987 no award
- 1988 no award
- 1989 Siddeswari - Mani Kaul

=== 1990s ===
- 1990 no award
- 1991 Amjad Ali Khan – Gulzar
- 1992 Ram ke Naam – Anand Patwardhan
- 1993 All in the Family – Ketan Mehta
- 1994 I Live in Behrampada – Madhushree Datta
- 1995 Manzar – Gopi Desai
- 1996 A Narmada Diary – Anand Patwardhan and Simantini Dhuru
- 1997 Beyond the Himalayas – Goutam Ghose

== See also ==
- Filmfare Awards
- Cinema of India
