= National Film Award for Best Non-Feature Film =

Indian film award

- National award for contributions to non-feature films
- Awarded for: Best Non-Feature Film of the year
- Sponsored by: National Film Development Corporation of India
- Formerly called: President's Gold Medal for the Best Documentary Film (1953–1966); Best Information Film (1967–1983)
- Rewards: Swarna Kamal (Golden Lotus); ₹3,00,000
- First award: 1953
- Most recent winner: Bhangaar (2024)

The National Film Award for Best Non-Feature Film is one of the National Film Awards presented annually by the National Film Development Corporation of India. It is one of several awards presented for non-feature films (including documentaries, short films, etc) and awarded with Swarna Kamal (Golden Lotus).

The award was instituted in 1953, at 1st National Film Awards and awarded annually for short films produced in the year across the country, in all Indian languages.

== Winners ==
Award includes 'Swarna Kamal' (Golden Lotus) and cash prize. Following are the award winners over the years:

Awards legends
*	President's Silver Medal for Best Non-Feature Film
*	Certificate of Merit for the Second Best Non-Feature Film
*	Certificate of Merit for the Third Best Non-Feature Film
*	Certificate of Merit for the Best Non-Feature Film
*	Indicates a joint award for that year

List of films, showing the year (award ceremony), language(s), producer(s) and director(s)
Year	Film(s)	Language(s)	Producer(s)	Director(s)	Refs.
1953 (1st)	Mahabalipuram	English	Films Division	Jagat Murari	
1953 (1st)	Holy Himalayas	English	Films Division	K. L. Khandpur	
1953 (1st)	Tree of Wealth	English	Information Films of India	A. Bhaskar Rao	
1954 (2nd)	Spirit of the Loom	English	Films Division	V. R. Sarma	
1954 (2nd)	Darjeeling	English	Films Division	K. L. Khandpur	
1954 (2nd)	Golden River	English	Films Division	P. V. Pathy	
1955 (3rd)	Magic of Mountains	English	Films Division	Mushir Ahmed	
1955 (3rd)	Wonder of Work	English	Films Division	–	
1955 (3rd)	Education for Life	English	Ama Ltd.	–	
1956 (4th)	Gotama The Buddha	English	Bimal Roy Productions for Films Division	Rajbans Khanna	
1956 (4th)	Khajuraho	English	Films Division	M. Wadhwani	
1956 (4th)	A Village In Travancore	English	Art Films of Asia Private Ltd. for Burmah-Shell	Fali Billimoria	
1957 (5th)	A Himalayan Tapestry	English	Burmah Shell	Mohan Bhavnani	
1957 (5th)	Mandu	English	Films Division	Neil Gokhale	
1957 (5th)	Dharti Ki Jhankar	English	Films Division	Bhaskar Rao	
1958 (6th)	Radha Krishna	English	Films Division	J. S. Bhownagary	
1958 (6th)	The Story of Dr. Karve	English	Films Division	Neil Gokhale and Ram Gabale	
1958 (6th)	Call of the Mountains	Hindi	Films Division	A. K. Chaudhuri	
1959 (7th)	Kathakali	English	Films Division	Mohan Wadhwani	
1959 (7th)	Mayurakshi Dam	Hindi	Films Division	N. K. Issar	
1960 (8th)	Kangra and Kulu	English	Films Division	N. S. Thapu	
1960 (8th)	Saga of Service	English	Films Division	Dilip Jamdar	
1960 (8th)	The Weavers	English	Films Division	F. R. Bilimoria	
1961 (9th)	Rabindranath Tagore	English	Films Division	Satyajit Ray	
1961 (9th)	Our Feathered Friends	English	Films Division	Gopal Datt	
1961 (9th)	Romance of the Indian Coin	English	Films Division	G. H. Saraiya	
1962 (10th)	Four Centuries Ago	English	Films Division	Shanti Verma	
1962 (10th)	Himalayan Heritage	English	Films Division	N. S. Thapu	
1962 (10th)	The Telco Story	English	Hunnar Films	Clement Baptista	
1963 (11th)	Song of the Snow	English	Films Division	N. S. Thapu	
1963 (11th)	Malwa	English	Films Division	S. N. S. Sastry	
1963 (11th)	Jain Temples of India	English	Films Division	Arun Chaudhari	
1964 (12th)	One Day	English	Jagat Murari	S. N. S. Sastry	
1964 (12th)	All Under Heaven By Force	English	J. B. H. Wadia	J. B. H. Wadia	
1964 (12th)	And Miles To Go	English	S.Sukhdev	S.Sukhdev	
1965 (13th)	Cloven Horizon	English	Kantilal Rathod	Kantilal Rathod	
1965 (13th)	Across India	English	Films Division	Gopal Datt	
1966 (14th)	Glimpses of West Bengal	English			
1967 (15th)	India '67	–	S.Sukhdev	S.Sukhdev	
1968 (16th)	Everest	English	Arun Chowdhury for Films Division	N. S. Thapa	
1969 (17th)	Amrita Sher-Gil	English	B. D. Garga	B. D. Garga	
1970 (18th)	No Award				
1971 (19th)	Bhutan				
1972 (20th)	The Inner Eye	English	Satyajit Ray	Satyajit Ray	
1973 (21st)	The Flame Burns Bright	English	Ashish Mukherjee	Ashish Mukherjee	
1974 (22nd)	Man in Search of Man	English	G. P. Asthana for Films Division	Prem Vaidya for Films Division	
1975 (23rd)	Winged Wonderland	English	Shanti Varma	Shanti Varma	
1976 (24th)	No Award				
1977 (25th)	Deshratna Rajendra Prasad	Hindi	Arvind Kumar Sinha	M. Prabhat	
1978 (26th)	Rumtek: A Monastery Wrethed in a Hundred Thousand Rainbows	English	Romesh Sharma	Romesh Sharma	
1979 (27th)	No Award				
1980 (28th)	Daldal	Hindi	Krystyna Khote	Pradeep Dixit	
1981 (29th)	Faces After The Storm	Hindi	Yash Chaudhary for Films Division	Prakash Jha	
1982 (30th)	An Indian Story	English	Suhasini Mulay	Tapan K. Bose	
1983 (31st)	The Procession	English	Aurora Films Corporation	Anjan Bose	
1984 (32nd)	Music of Satyajit Ray	English	NFDC	Utpalendu Chakrabarty	
1985 (33rd)	Bombay: Our City	English	Anand Patwardhan	Anand Patwardhan	
1986 (34th)	The Land of Sand Dunes	English	Orchid Films Pvt. Ltd.	Gautam Ghose	
1987 (35th)	Bhopal: Beyond Genocide	English	Cinemart Foundation	Tapan K. Bose, Suhasini Mulay and Salim Shaikh	
1988 (36th)	Kanaka Purandara	Kannada	Girish Karnad for Films Division	Girish Karnad	
1989 (37th)	Aar Koto Din	Bengali	Department of Information and Cultural Affairs India and Government of West Bengal	Shashi Anand	
1990 (38th)	Graven Image	English	Sumitendra Nath Tagore and Shyamasree Tagore	Abhijit Chattopadhyay	
1991 (39th)	Sons of Abotani: The Misings	Mishing	Dilip Doley	Gautam Bora	
1992 (40th)	In Search of Indian Theatre	English	Arundhati Chatterjee	Abhijit Chattopadhyay	
1993 (41st)	Maihar Raag	Bengali	Sunil Shanbag	Arun Bhattacharjee	
1994 (42nd)	Rasayatra	Hindi and English	Interaction Video Communication	Nandan Kudhyadi	
1995 (43rd)	Tarana	English	Y. N. Engineer for Films Division	Rajat Kapoor	
1996 (44th)	Sham's Vision	English	Manu Grover	Shaji N. Karun	
1997 (45th)	Jataner Jami	Bengali	Raja Mitra and Associates	Raja Mitra	
1998 (46th)	In The Forest Hangs a Bridge	English	Sanjay Kak	Sanjay Kak	
1999 (47th)	Dui Paatan Ke Beech Mein (Between the Devil and the Deep River)	Hindi	Arvind Sinha	Arvind Sinha	
2000 (48th)	Rasikpriya	Hindi and English	Ministry of External Affairs	Arun Vasant Khopkar	
2001 (49th)	Sonal	Hindi and English	Films Division	Prakash Jha	
2002 (50th)	Narayan Gangaram Surve	Marathi	Khayal Trust	Arun Khopkar	
2003 (51st)	War and Peace	English	Anand Patwardhan	Anand Patwardhan	
2003 (51st)	Kaya Poochhe Maya Se	Hindi	Arvind Sinha	Arvind Sinha	
2004 (52nd)	Girni	Marathi	Tripurari Sharan for FTII	Umesh Vinayak Kulkarni	
2005 (53rd)	Riding Solo to the Top of the World	English	Gaurav A. Jani and P. T. Giridhar Rao	Gaurav A. Jani	
2006 (54th)	Bishar Blues	English	Amitabh Chakraborty	Amitabh Chakraborty	
2007 (55th)	Hope Dies Last in War	English and Hindi	Supriyo Sen	Supriyo Sen	
2008 (56th)	AFSPA, 1958	Meitei and Hindi	Bachaspa Timayun Sunzu and Haobam Paban Kumar	Haobam Paban Kumar	
2009 (57th)	The Postman	Tamil	K. Hariharan	B. Manohar	
2009 (57th)	Bilal	Bengali and Hindi	Sourav Sarangi	Sourav Sarangi	
2010 (58th)	Germ	Hindi	Satyajit Ray Film and Television Institute	Snehal R. Nair	
2011 (59th)	And We Play On	Hindi and English	Pramod Purswane	Pramod Purswane	
2012 (60th)	Shepherds of Paradise	Gujari and Urdu	Raja Shabir Khan	Raja Shabir Khan	
2013 (61st)	Rangbhoomi	Hindi	Films Division	Kamal Swaroop	
2014 (62nd)	Tender is The Sight	Bengali	Films Division	Torsha Banerjee	
2015 (63rd)	Amdavad Ma Famous	Gujarati and Hindi	Akanksha Tewari and Arya A. Menon	Hardik Mehta	
2016 (64th)	FireFlies in the Abyss	English	Chandrasekhar Reddy	Chandrasekhar Reddy	
2017 (65th)	No Award				
2018 (66th)	Son Rise		V2 Films and Design Pvt. Ltd.	Vibha Bakshi	
2018 (66th)	The Secret Life of Frogs		Bedi Universal	Ajay Bedi and Vijay Bedi	
2019 (67th)	An Engineered Dream	Hindi	Hemant Gaba	Hemant Gaba	
2020 (68th)	Testimony of Ana	Dangi	Sachin Dheeraj Mudigonda	Sachin Dheeraj Mudigonda	
2021 (69th)	Ek Tha Gaon	Hindi	Shreya Kapadiya	Ankit Kothari	
2022 (70th)	Ayena	Hindi and Urdu	Teh Films	Siddhant Sarin	
2023 (71st)	Flowering Man	Hindi	Film and Television Institute of India	Soumyajit Ghosh Dastidar	
2024 (72nd)	Bhangaar	Marathi and English	Sumira Roy	Sumira Roy	
