= War and Peace (2002 film) =

2002 Indian film by Anand Patwardhan

- Directed by: Anand Patwardhan
- Cinematography: Anand Patwardhan
- Edited by: Anand Patwardhan, Monica Wahi, Sanjiv Shah
- Release date: 2002
- Running time: 135 minutes
- Country: India
- Languages: English, Hindi

War and Peace (Jang Aur Aman) is a 2002 Indian documentary film directed by Anand Patwardhan. The film covers the Indian and Pakistani nuclear weapons tests in 1998, as well as the nationalist rhetoric that accompanied these tests. It also explores the ill-effects of the Indian test on the surrounding population and the reactions to the test among the government and the public. The latter part of the film also covers the perception of nuclear weapons in Japan and the United States. Upon the film's completion, the Indian censor board demanded that Patwardhan make 21 cuts before it could be released, including cutting all speeches by politicians. Patwardhan refused and took the matter to court; the Bombay high court ruled in his favour a year later, and the film was released without any cuts.

== Synopsis ==
The documentary begins with the assassination of Mahatma Gandhi by the assassin Nathuram Godse in 1948. The film then describes the years after Indian independence. In a voice-over, Patwardhan describes several events, including the United States' use of the nuclear bomb, the nuclear arms race during the Cold War, and India's first nuclear test in 1974. Patwardhan summarizes them in the following manner: "The collapse of socialism saw a revival of bigotry. America had now become our role model." The film then examines the growing nuclear nationalism in India. It covers the Hindu-nationalist rhetoric of the Bharatiya Janata Party that surrounded Indian nuclear weapons tests in 1998. The film covers the "Global Peace March" that occurred following the nuclear tests at Pokhran, and the opposition it faced from activists of the Sangh Parivar. It also covers the rise of religious extremism in both India and Pakistan. Patwardhan travels to Pakistan, where he interviews several people, including school-girls participating in a debate on the use of the bomb. In the second half of the documentary, Patwardhan travels to Japan to interview the hibakusha, survivors of the atomic bombings of Hiroshima and Nagasaki by the United States. The film then moves to the United States, where Patwardhan interviews curators of the Smithsonian Institution. The curators describe how the United States Congress blocked an attempt to create an exhibition on the American use of the atomic bomb on Hiroshima, and the effects of nuclear weapons. A postscript to the film shows the September 11 attacks, and the response of the US.

== Production ==
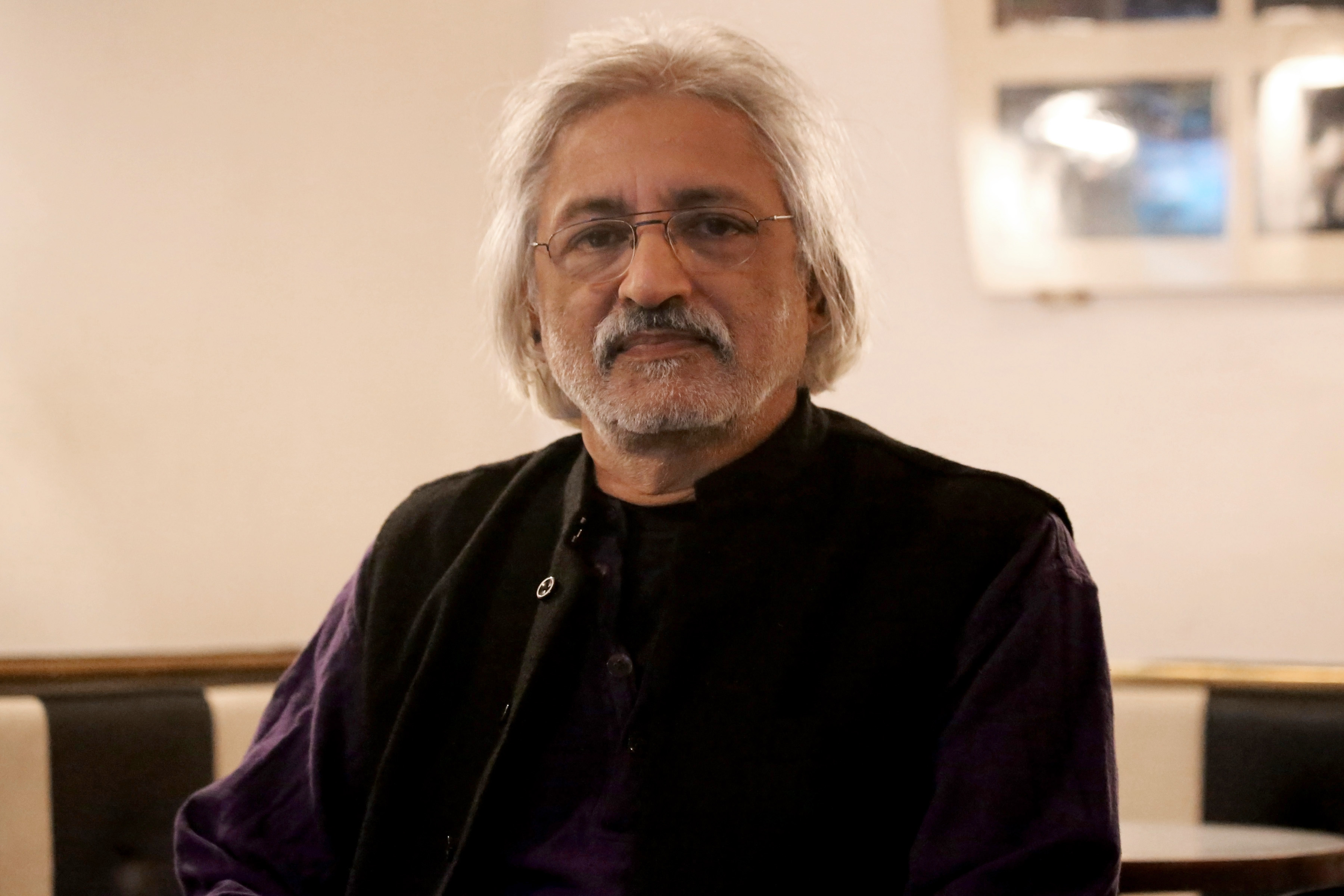
director, producer and cameraman Anand Patwardhan

The documentary was shot for three years following Indian nuclear weapons tests in 1998. It sought to explore the Hindu-nationalist rhetoric that accompanied the test. It included footage shot in India, Pakistan, Japan, and the United States. The documentary was produced and directed by Patwardhan himself, who was also responsible for the camera work.

== Release and censorship ==
The Central Board of Film Certification, often referred to as the Indian Censor Board, asked Patwardhan to make 21 cuts before the documentary could be released. Among the scenes that were ordered to be cut were the killing of Mahatma Gandhi by the Hindu-nationalist assassin Nathuram Godse in 1948, as well as scenes critical of leaders of the Bharatiya Janata Party, which held the central government at that point. The board also asked Patwardhan to cut scenes depicting an exposé of corruption in the defence department of the NDA government by Tehelka magazine, as well as all speeches by politicians and the prime minister. Patwardhan refused to cut the scenes, stating that this was because the scenes were of politically sensitive issues. As a result, the film was banned for over a year. However, after a court battle, the film was screened without a single cut. As with his previous films, Patwardhan also successfully petitioned the court to force the national broadcaster, Doordarshan, to show this film on its national network. It was commercially released in June 2005.

== Reception and analysis ==
Tehelka magazine called the film a "monumental event for Indian cinema." A review in the magazine Variety stated that the three-hour length of the documentary was a problem, and that it was "long-winded and discursive." However, it said the content of the film was of "immense interest and importance in reminding the viewer of the threat to world peace posed by continuing posturing on the subcontinent." In a review, scholar Linda Hess stated that the film was too long, but that the importance of the content and the skill of the producer made it worth watching. Hess states that the themes of the film included the rise of religious bigotry and militarism in Indian politics, the nuclear arms race triggered by the United States, and at the largest scale, violence and non-violence. The film repeatedly uses images of Mahatma Gandhi juxtaposed with footage that depicts militant ideologies in both India and Pakistan, such as footage of an Islamist rally in Pakistan calling for Islamic world domination, followed by a rally of the Shiv Sena, which calls for a world dominated by Hindutva. Hess goes on to say that the Patwardhan's depiction of the film's complex content has a sense of irony and humor, and that "his eye and voice are unsentimental, his intellect acute."

== Awards ==
- Grand Prize, 2002 Earth Vision Film Festival (Tokyo)
- Best Film and International Jury Prize, 2002 Mumbai International Film Festival
- International Film Critics' Award (FIPRESCI), 2002 Sydney Film Festival
- Best Documentary, 2003 Karachi International Film Festival
- Gold Award by Indian Documentary Producer's Association in 2002
- Best Documentary, 2003 International Video Festival, Kerala
- Silver Dhow, 2003 Zanzibar International Film Festival
- 2004 National Film Award for Best Non-Feature Film, India
