= National Film Award for Best Investigative Film =

Indian film award

- award for contributions to short film
- Sponsored by: Directorate of Film Festivals
- Rewards: Rajat Kamal (Silver Lotus); ₹50,000
- First award: 1990
- Final award: 2021
- Most recent winner: Looking for Challan

Highlights
- Total awarded: 25
- First winner: Una Mitran Di Yaad Pyaari (In Memory of Friends)

The National Film Award for Best Investigative Film was one of the National Film Awards presented annually by the Directorate of Film Festivals, the organisation set up by Ministry of Information and Broadcasting, India. It was one of several awards presented for non-feature films and awarded with Rajat Kamal (Silver Lotus).

The award was instituted in 1990, at 38th National Film Awards and awarded annually for short films produced in the year across the country, in all Indian languages. At the 70th National Film Awards, the award is discontinued and clubbed with National Film Award for Best Promotional Film, National Film Award for Best Scientific Film, National Film Award for Best Educational/Motivational/Instructional Film, National Film Award for Best Exploration/Adventure Film, National Film Award for Best Anthropological/Ethnographic Film, National Film Award for Best Agriculture Film, National Film Award for Best Film on Social Issues and National Film Award for Best Non-Feature Environment/Conservation/Preservation Film, and two new categories were created; Best Documentary and Best Non Feature Film Promoting Social and Environmental Values.

== Winners ==
Award includes 'Rajat Kamal' (Silver Lotus) and cash prize. Following are the award winners over the years:

List of films, showing the year, language(s), producer(s) and director(s)
Year	Film(s)	Language(s)	Producer(s)	Director(s)	Refs.
1990 (38th)	Una Mitran Di Yaad Pyaari (In Memory of Friends)	• English • Hindi • Punjabi	Anand Patwardhan	Anand Patwardhan	
1991 (39th)	Bhagirathi Ki Pukaar	Hindi	Anwar Jamal	Anwar Jamal	
1992 (40th)	Ram ke Naam	Hindi	Anand Patwardhan	Anand Patwardhan	
1993 (41st)	Benefit For Whom at Whose Cost?	English	Dinesh Lakhanpal	Dinesh Lakhanpal	
1994 (42nd)	Father, Son and Holy War (Part I – Trial by Fire, Part II – Hero Pharmacy)	• Hindi • English	Anand Patwardhan	Anand Patwardhan	
1995 (43rd)	Limit to Freedom	English	Deepak Roy	Deepak Roy	
1996 (44th)	N. M. No. 309 Bhiwandi Tragedy	English	Yash Chowdhary	V. Packiri Swamy	
1997 (45th)	Thirst	Hindi	Y. N. Engineer for Films Division	Swadesh Pathak for Films Division	
1998 (46th)	Saga of Darkness	Bengali	Creative Image	Gautam Sen	
1999 (47th)	No Award				
2000 (48th)	Wearing the face	English	Bankim for Films Division	Joshy Joseph for Films Division	
2001 (49th)	Kalahandi	• Oriya • English	Soudamini Mishra	Gautam Ghose	
2002 (50th)	No Award				
2003 (51st)	A Silent Killer	English	Dhananjoy Mondal	Dhananjoy Mondal	
2004 (52nd)	Harvest of Hunger	• English • Oriya	Action Aid India	Rupashree Nanda	
2005 (53rd)	The Whistle Blowers	English	Rajiv Mehrotra	Umesh Aggarwal	
2006 (54th)	Mere Desh Ki Dharti	Hindi	Rajiv Mehrotra	Sumit Khanna	
2007 (55th)	The Journalist and a Jihadi	English	Romesh Sharma	• Romesh Sharma • Ahmad Jamal	
2008 (56th)	Distant Rumblings	English	Ms. Rongsenkala	Bani Prakash Das	
2009 (57th)	No Award				
2010 (58th)	A Pestering Journey	• Malayalam • Punjabi • Hindi • English • Tulu	Ranjini Krishnan	K. R. Manoj	
2011 (59th)	Cotton for My Shroud	English	Kavita Bahl	• Nandan Saxena • Kavita Bahl	
2012 (60th)	Inshallah, Kashmir	English	Ashvin Kumar	Ashvin Kumar	
2013 (61st)	Katiyabaaz	• Hindi • Urdu • English	Globalistan Films Pvt. Ltd.	• Deepti Kakkar • Fahad Mustafa	
2014 (62nd)	Phum Shang		Films Division	Haobam Paban Kumar	
2015 (63rd)	Tezpur 1962	English	Films Division	Samujjal Kashyap	
2016 (64th)	Placebo	English	Archana Fadke	Abhay Kumar	
2017 (65th)	1984, When the Sun Didn't Rise		Teenaa Kaur Pasricha	Teenaa Kaur Pasricha	
2018 (66th)	Amoli		Culture Machine Media Pvt. Ltd.	• Jasmine Kaur Roy • Avinash Roy	
2020 (68th)	The Saviour Brig. Pritam Singh	Punjabi	Akaal Productions	• Paramjeet Singh Kattu • Karanvir Singh Sibla	
2021 (69th)	Looking for Challan	English	Indira Gandhi National Centre for the Arts	Bappa Ray	
