= 38th National Film Awards =

1991 Indian film award

- Awarded for: Best of Indian cinema in 1990
- Awarded by: Directorate of Film Festivals
- Presented by: R. Venkataraman (President of India)
- Announced on: 7 April 1991
- Site: Siri Fort Auditorium, New Delhi
- Official website: dff.nic.in

Highlights
- Best Feature Film: Marupakkam
- Best Non-Feature Film: Graven Image
- Best Book: Hindi Cinema Ka Itihaas
- Best Film Critic: Shoma A. Chatterjee
- Dadasaheb Phalke Award: Akkineni Nageswara Rao
- Most awards: Lekin... (5)

The 38th National Film Awards, presented by Directorate of Film Festivals, the organisation set up by Ministry of Information and Broadcasting, India to felicitate the best of Indian Cinema released in the year 1990. The ceremony took place in 1991.

With 38th National Film Awards, couple of new awards were instituted for Non-Feature films section. These awards includes Best Investigative Film, Best Audiography, Best Cinematography and Best Editing.

== Awards ==
Awards were divided into feature films, non-feature films and books written on Indian cinema.

=== Lifetime Achievement Award ===
Name of Award	Image	Awardee(s)	Awarded As	Awards
Dadasaheb Phalke Award		Akkineni Nageswara Rao	Actor	Swarna Kamal, ₹ 100,000 and a Shawl

=== Feature films ===
Feature films were awarded at All India as well as regional level. For 38th National Film Awards, a Tamil film, Marupakkam won the National Film Award for Best Feature Film, whereas a Hindi film, Lekin... won the maximum number of awards (5). Following were the awards given in each category:

==== Juries ====
A committee headed by veteran actor Ashok Kumar was appointed to evaluate the feature films awards. Following were the jury members:

- Jury Members
  - Ashok Kumar (chairperson) • Usha Khanna • P. V. Gangadharan • Honey Irani • Janardhan Roy • Raj Bisaria • T. Subbarami Reddy • Sripriya • Komal Swaminathan • J. P. Das • Rekha Sahay • G. V. Iyer • T. S. Narasimhan • Bhupen Hazarika • Kalpana Lajmi • Premlata Bajpai • Shaji N. Karun

==== All India Award ====
Following were the awards given:

===== Golden Lotus Award =====
Official Name: Swarna Kamal

All the awardees are awarded with 'Golden Lotus Award (Swarna Kamal)', a certificate and cash prize.

Name of Award	Name of Film	Language	Awardee(s)	Cash prize
Best Feature Film	Marupakkam	Tamil	Producer: NFDC and Doordarshan	₹ 50,000/-
Best Feature Film	Marupakkam	Tamil	director: K. S. Sethumadhavan	₹ 25,000/-
Best Feature Film	Citation: For striking a balance between the existing traditional values and the modern values that are infused subsequently, and for treating the subject with the highest standards or aesthetic excellence.			
Best Debut Film of a Director	Perumthachan	Malayalam	Producer: G. Jayakumar; Director: Ajayan	₹ 25,000/- Each
Best Debut Film of a Director	Citation: For depicting a historical backdrop with authenticity, shattering all traditional beliefs with superlative artistic texture.			
Best Popular Film Providing Wholesome Entertainment	Ghayal	Hindi	Producer: Dharmendra	₹ 40,000/-
Best Popular Film Providing Wholesome Entertainment	Ghayal	Hindi	Director: Rajkumar Santoshi	₹ 20,000/-
Best Popular Film Providing Wholesome Entertainment	Citation: For being thematically highly credible, emotionally very well-woven, logically executed, and technically superb film.			
Best Direction	Ek Doctor Ki Maut	Hindi	Tapan Sinha	₹ 50,000/-
Best Direction	Citation: For having presented a contemporary problem with courage, subtlety and finesse.			

===== Silver Lotus Award =====
Official Name: Rajat Kamal

All the awardees are awarded with 'Silver Lotus Award (Rajat Kamal)', a certificate and cash prize.

Name of Award	Awardee(s)	Name of Film	Language	Cash prize
Second Best Feature Film	Producer: NFDC	Ek Doctor Ki Maut	Hindi	₹30,000/-
Second Best Feature Film	Director: Tapan Sinha	Ek Doctor Ki Maut	Hindi	₹15,000/-
Second Best Feature Film	Citation: For making a relevant social comment, presented in a tremendously communicative yet emotional manner.			
Best Film on Other Social Issues	Producer: Kavithalayaa Productions	Oru Veedu Iru Vasal	Tamil	₹ 30,000/-
Best Film on Other Social Issues	Director: K. Balachander	Oru Veedu Iru Vasal	Tamil	₹ 15,000/-
Best Film on Other Social Issues	Citation: For focussing on women's problem and very sensitively showing the path by which women can be emancipated.			
Best Actor	Amitabh Bachchan	Agneepath	Hindi	₹ 10,000/-
Best Actor	Citation: For a towering performance, rising above the script with variation and nuances at all levels.			
Best Actress	Vijayashanti	Karthavyam	Telugu	₹ 10,000/-
Best Actress	Citation: For depicting both aggression and femininity with balance and restraint.			
Best Supporting Actor	Nedumudi Venu	His Highness Abdullah	Malayalam	₹ 10,000/-
Best Supporting Actor	Citation: For maintaining the character with consistency and sensitivity.			
Best Supporting Actress	K. P. A. C. Lalitha	Amaram	Malayalam	₹ 10,000/-
Best Supporting Actress	Citation: For portraying an ethnic character with authenticity.			
Best Child Artist	• Baby Shruti • Master Tarun • Baby Shamili	Anjali	Tamil	₹ 5,000/-
Best Child Artist	Citation: For giving excellent performances in which the children come across in all naturalness and yet give a glimpse of the adult within.			
Best Male Playback Singer	M. G. Sreekumar	His Highness Abdullah ("Naadaroopini Sankari Pahimam")	Malayalam	₹ 10,000/-
Best Male Playback Singer	Citation: For an excellent rendering of a classical-based tune encompassing all ranges accurately.			
Best Female Playback Singer	Lata Mangeshkar	Lekin...	Hindi	₹ 10,000/-
Best Female Playback Singer	Citation: For singing with outstanding expressions with the rarest and purest of styles.			
Best Cinematography	Cameraman: Santosh Sivan; Laboratory Processing: M/s Vijay Colour Laboratories	Perumthachan	Malayalam	₹ 10,000/- Each
Best Cinematography	Citation: For heightening the mood of the film with the highest visual standards.			
Best Screenplay	K. S. Sethumadhavan	Marupakkam	Tamil	₹ 10,000/-
Best Screenplay	Citation: For depicting a simplistic story, capturing the various levels of philosophy, psychology, tradition and relationships perfectly.			
Best Audiography	N. Pandurangan	Anjali	Tamil	₹ 10,000/-
Best Audiography	Citation: For aesthetically weaving the soundtrack in the most creative manner to enhance the visuals of the film.			
Best Editing	M. S. Mani	Iyer the Great	Malayalam	₹ 10,000/-
Best Editing	Citation: For slick well-placed editing which elevates the craft of the film.			
Best Art Direction	Nitish Roy	Lekin...	Hindi	₹ 10,000/-
Best Art Direction	Citation: For maintaining the era, etching the characters against the canvas, with perfect colour, design and execution.			
Best Costume Design	Bhanu Athaiya	Lekin...	Hindi	₹ 10,000/-
Best Costume Design	Citation: For the texture and tone of the costumes, which heighten the visual quality of the film, breaking away from the traditional image of bright Rajasthani colours by using subdued pastel shades.			
Best Music Direction	Hridaynath Mangeshkar	Lekin...	Hindi	₹ 10,000/-
Best Music Direction	Citation: For using traditional tunes and instruments creatively, with litting melody and haunting perfection.			
Best Lyrics	Gulzar	Lekin...	Hindi	₹ 10,000/-
Best Lyrics	Citation: For evoking beautiful imagery, created through lyrical poetry.			
Special Jury Award	Sunny Deol (Actor)	Ghayal	Hindi	₹ 10,000/- Each
Special Jury Award	Citation: For an effective portrayal of a youth, victimised by the inherent evil in aspects of the present police system.			₹ 10,000/- Each
Special Jury Award	Pankaj Kapoor (Actor)	Ek Doctor Ki Maut	Hindi	₹ 10,000/- Each
Special Jury Award	Citation: For having effectively projected the in-built trauma of an aspiring, thinking, creative mind, in the context of a demoralising, fossilised system of establishment that does not provide scope for fruitation of a path-finding spirit.			₹ 10,000/- Each
Special Jury Award	Jayabharathi (Actor)	Marupakkam	Tamil	₹ 10,000/- Each
Special Jury Award	Citation: For a touching portrayal of the agony of a woman who has been emotionally neglected, unwittingly.			₹ 10,000/- Each
Special Mention	Anoubam Kiranmala (Actor)	Ishanou	Meitei	Certificate Only
Special Mention	Citation: For a debut performance depicting various levels of conflict effectively.			

==== Regional Awards ====
The award is given to best film in the regional languages in India.

Name of Award	Name of Film	Awardee(s)	Cash prize
Best Feature Film in Assamese	Jooj	Producer: Bipul Baruah	₹ 20,000/-
Best Feature Film in Assamese	Jooj	Director: Hemen Das	₹ 10,000/-
Best Feature Film in Assamese	Citation: For attempting to portray, with conviction, the earthy realism in the field of social differences.		
Best Feature Film in Bengali	Atmaja	Producer: Raj Kumar Jain	₹ 20,000/-
Best Feature Film in Bengali	Atmaja	Director: Nabyendu Chatterjee	₹ 10,000/-
Best Feature Film in Bengali	Citation: For its masterly depiction of a mother's quest, torn between the hollowness of wealth and the transcendence of human values.		
Best Feature Film in Hindi	Drishti	Producer: Govind Nihalani	₹ 20,000/-
Best Feature Film in Hindi	Drishti	Director: Govind Nihalani	₹ 10,000/-
Best Feature Film in Hindi	Citation: For depicting marital pain very effectively.		
Best Feature Film in Kannada	Muthina Haara	Producer: Rajendra Singh Babu	₹ 20,000/-
Best Feature Film in Kannada	Muthina Haara	Director: Rajendra Singh Babu	₹ 10,000/-
Best Feature Film in Kannada	Citation: For effectively portraying patriotism.		
Best Feature Film in Malayalam	Vasthuhara	Producer: T. Ravindranath	₹ 20,000/-
Best Feature Film in Malayalam	Vasthuhara	Director: G. Aravindan	₹ 10,000/-
Best Feature Film in Malayalam	Citation: For being a human document, depicting the cruelties meted out by society to the dispossessed.		
Best Feature Film in Tamil	Anjali	Producer: Sujatha Productions Pvt. Ltd	₹ 20,000/-
Best Feature Film in Tamil	Anjali	Director: Mani Ratnam	₹ 10,000/-
Best Feature Film in Tamil	Citation: For the unusual usage of film form, utilising music, choreography and sound with depth, achieving the highest aesthetic excellence to narrate the emotional nearness of the mentally retarted.		
Best Feature Film in Telugu	Matti Manushulu	Producer: K. Mukherjee and Veda Kumar	₹ 20,000/-
Best Feature Film in Telugu	Matti Manushulu	Director: B. Narsing Rao	₹ 10,000/-
Best Feature Film in Telugu	Citation: For portraying the stark reality of pain which has been underlined with the warm hues of life.		

Best Feature Film in Each of the Language Other Than Those Specified in the Schedule VIII of the Constitution

Name of Award	Name of Film	Awardee(s)	Cash prize
Best Feature Film in Manipuri	Ishanou	Producer: Aribam Syam Sharma	₹ 20,000/-
Best Feature Film in Manipuri	Ishanou	Director: Aribam Syam Sharma	₹ 10,000/-
Best Feature Film in Manipuri	Citation: For effectively portraying the tragedy behind the institution of Maibi which unfortunately shatters a family.		

=== Non-Feature Films ===
Short Films made in any Indian language and certified by the Central Board of Film Certification as a documentary/newsreel/fiction are eligible for non-feature film section.

==== Juries ====
A committee headed by S. Krishnaswamy was appointed to evaluate the non-feature films awards. Following were the jury members:

- Jury Members
  - S. Krishnaswamy (chairperson) • Madan Bawaria • Pramod Mathur • Vijaya Nirmala • Swapan Ghose

==== Golden Lotus Award ====
Official Name: Swarna Kamal

All the awardees are awarded with 'Golden Lotus Award (Swarna Kamal)', a certificate and cash prize.

Name of Award	Name of Film	Language	Awardee(s)	Cash prize
Best Non-Feature Film	Graven Image	English	Producer: Sumitendra Nath Tagore and Shyamasree Tagore; Director: Abhijit Chattopadhyay	₹ 15,000/- Each
Best Non-Feature Film	Citation: For combining the intimate portrayal of a sculptor in terms of biographical detail, bringing in the nuances of his art, summing up to an excellent portrait of a person, an artist, a period, and achieing this with high cinematic values.			

==== Silver Lotus Award ====
Official Name: Rajat Kamal

All the awardees are awarded with 'Silver Lotus Award (Rajat Kamal)' and cash prize.

Name of Award	Name of Film	Language	Awardee(s)	Cash prize
Best Anthropological / Ethnographic Film	Lolaab	English	Producer: Hillman Film Pvt. Ltd; Director: Mohi-Ud-Din Mirza	₹ 10,000/- Each
Best Anthropological / Ethnographic Film	Citation: For dedication and conviction with which life in a remote area of the land has been portrayed, with intimacy, sympathy, authenticity and without being condescending, and for the apparent hard work that has gone into the production.			
Best Biographical Film	Baba	English	Producer: Mediart Film Pvt. Ltd; Director: Rajiv Mehrotra	₹ 10,000/- Each
Best Biographical Film	Citation: For the relaxed and sensitive portrayal of an extraordinary man of our times, bubbling with humanity, portraying the social causes for which Baba Amte has dedicated life, with a sense of deep involvement, never descending to eulogising.			
Best Arts / Cultural Film	Figures of Thought	English	Producer: Arun Khopkar; Director: Arun Khopkar	₹ 10,000/- Each
Best Arts / Cultural Film	Citation: For exceptionally beautiful portrayal of the work of three painters, with verve, and unpretentious, but excellent visuals.			
Best Arts / Cultural Film	Vaastu Marabu	English	Producer: Min Bimbangal; Director: Bala Kailasam	₹ 10,000/- Each
Best Arts / Cultural Film	Citation: For portraying the philosophy of traditional "Shilpi", transcending the physical form of the sculpture, exploring the collective unconscious of Indian sculptors.			
Best Scientific Film (including Environment and Ecology)	Biotechnology: Some Possibilities	English	Producer: Gul Bahar Singh for Films Division; Director: Nishith Banerjee	₹ 10,000/- Each
Best Scientific Film (including Environment and Ecology)	Citation: For trading through new horizons of the futuristic, yet scientifically realisable possibilities at the threshold of a new era, with technical finesse.			
Best Agricultural Film	Golden Earth	English	Producer: BAIF Development Research Foundation; Director: Vishram Revankar	₹ 10,000/- Each
Best Agricultural Film	Citation: For effective communication of the techniques of soil and water conservation, in a simple manner, without being simplistic with the medium.			
Best Environment / Conservation / Preservation Film	Pratikriya	Desiya	Producer: Rahat Yusufi; Director: Rahat Yusufi	₹ 10,000/- Each
Best Environment / Conservation / Preservation Film	Citation: For dealing with the problem of the environment at the grassroots level, combining the talent to handle ordinary people and get excellent performances out of them, with a clarity of message and commitment to the cause.			
Best Film on Social Issues	Safe Drinking Water for All	English	Producer: R. Krishna Mohan for Films Division; Director: Mahesh P. Sinha	₹ 10,000/- Each
Best Film on Social Issues	Citation: For effectively portraying the fundamental problem of drinking water and the steps being taken to solve the problem, without descending to propaganda.			
Best Educational / Motivational / Instructional Film	Ducks Out of Water	English	Producer: D. Gautaman; Director: Raj Gopal Rao	₹ 10,000/- Each
Best Educational / Motivational / Instructional Film	Citation: For beautiful imagery, elevating a routine theme to levels of aesthetic excellence.			
Best Educational / Motivational / Instructional Film	Natun Asha	Assamese	Producer: Beauty Sabhapandit; Director: Arup Borthakur	₹ 10,000/- Each
Best Educational / Motivational / Instructional Film	Citation: For being an instructional film in which form and content compete for excellence.			
Best Exploration / Adventure Film (including Sports)	Indigenous Games of Manipur	English	Producer: Aribam Syam Sharma; Director: Aribam Syam Sharma	₹ 10,000/- Each
Best Exploration / Adventure Film (including Sports)	Citation: For sharing the primordial joys of spontaneous sports, tracing some historic links between the traditional sports of Manipur and the world at large.			
Best Investigative Film	Una Mitran Di Yaad Pyaari (In Memory of Friends)	English, Hindi and Punjabi	Producer: Anand Patwardhan; Director: Anand Patwardhan	₹ 10,000/- Each
Best Investigative Film	Citation: For the ardent pursuit of truth in an explosive contemporary atmosphere, with objectivity, courage and lucidity.			
Best Short Fiction Film	Aamukh	Hindi	Producer: Film and Television Institute of India; Director: Rajkumar	₹ 10,000/- Each
Best Short Fiction Film	Citation: For being a forceful statement of the personal rights of a woman through the emotional impact of one incident in which she rises against a social taboo.			
Best Cinematography	Mohiniyattam	English	Cameraman: Santosh Sivan; Laboratory Processing: Prasad Film Laboratories	₹ 10,000/- Each
Best Cinematography	Citation: For evocative, lyrical beauty with which the camera has painted the dancer and her milieu.			
Best Cinematography	Where No Journeys End	English	Cameraman: Victor Banerjee; Laboratory Processing: Chitranjali Laboratories	₹ 10,000/- Each
Best Cinematography	Citation: For the dramatic manner in which the Indian landscape unfolds, seducing the viewer with timeless beauty of India.			
Best Audiography	Mohor	Bengali	Sujit Sarkar	₹ 10,000/- Each
Best Audiography	Citation: For preserving the aura of Gurudev's presence by transporting the audience through the years in the flowering of Rabindra Sangeet, embellishing the performance of the great singer Kanika Bandopadhyay.			
Best Editing	Mohiniyattam	English	Rajasekharan	₹ 10,000/- Each
Best Editing	Citation: For making use of the full potential of the dimensions of space and time with creative excellence.			
Special Jury Award	Ustad Amjad Ali Khan	Hindi	Gulzar (director)	₹ 10,000/-
Special Jury Award	Citation: For bringing out the essence of a man and his music, emphassising the qualities of an artiste being distinct, but not distant from the people, as part of an unbroken tradition.			
Special Mention	Technique of Seed Production in Wheat and Paddy	English	Raj Gopal Rao (Director)	Certificate Only
Special Mention	Citation: For effective dissemination of agricultural information.			Certificate Only
Special Mention	Cactus and Roses	English	Siddharth Kak (Director)	Certificate Only
Special Mention	Citation: For his sophesticated presentation of a pioneering industrial establishment.			Certificate Only
Special Mention	Aadhi Haqueeqat Aadha Fasana	Hindi	Dilip Ghose (Director)	Certificate Only
Special Mention	Citation: For deglamourising the world of cinema in the minds of innocent toddler talent.			Certificate Only
Special Mention	Sambandh	Hindi	Naresh Saxena (Director)	Certificate Only
Special Mention	Citation: For the excellent nucleus of an idea, building an emotional bridge between a family and a tree.			Certificate Only

=== Best Writing on Cinema ===
The awards aim at encouraging study and appreciation of cinema as an art form and dissemination of information and critical appreciation of this art-form through publication of books, articles, reviews etc.

==== Juries ====
A committee headed by Amita Malik was appointed to evaluate the writing on Indian cinema. Following were the jury members:

- Jury Members
  - Amita Malik (chairperson) • Vinod Bhardwaj • Punathil Kunjabdulla

==== Golden Lotus Award ====
Official Name: Swarna Kamal

All the awardees are awarded with 'Golden Lotus Award (Swarna Kamal)' and cash prize.

Name of Award	Name of Book	Language	Awardee(s)	Cash prize
Best Book on Cinema	Hindi Cinema Ka Itihaas	Hindi	Author: Manmohan Chadhha; Publisher: Sachin Prakashan	₹ 10,000/- Each
Best Book on Cinema	Citation: For placing the development of Hindi Cinema in the context of the totality of Indian Cinema and World Cinema, while giving due importance to research.			

==== Silver Lotus Award ====
Official Name: Rajat Kamal

All the awardees are awarded with 'Silver Lotus Award (Rajat Kamal)' and cash prize.

Name of Award	Language	Awardee(s)	Cash prize
Best Film Critic	Bengali	Shoma A. Chatterjee	₹ 5,000/-
Best Film Critic	Citation: For managing admirably to get away from routine and the beaten track. She has covered an astonishing range of subjects in the articles submitted. Whether it is an interview, a critique or analysis of an unusual subject, she has combined depth with elegance.		

=== Awards not given ===
Following were the awards not given as no film was found to be suitable for the award:

- Best Children's Film
- Best Feature Film on National Integration
- Best Film on Family Welfare
- Best Film on Environment Conservation / Preservation
- Best Feature Film in English
- Best Feature Film in Marathi
- Best Feature Film in Oriya
- Best Feature Film in Punjabi
- Best Promotional Film
- Best Historical Reconstruction / Compilation Film
- Best Non-Feature Film on Family Welfare
- Best Animation Film
- Best First Non-Feature Film
- Best Non-Feature Film Direction
