= 47th National Film Awards =

Indian ceremony celebrating cinema of 1999

- Awarded for: Best of Indian cinema in 1999
- Awarded by: Directorate of Film Festivals
- Presented by: K. R. Narayanan (President of India)
- Announced on: 5 July 2000
- Presented on: 18 September 2000
- Site: Vigyan Bhawan, New Delhi
- Official website: dff.nic.in

Highlights
- Best Feature Film: Vanaprastham
- Best Non-Feature Film: Dui Paatan Ke Beech Mein
- Best Book: • Malayala Cinemayum Sahithyavum • Marathi Chitrapat Sangeetachi Vatchal
- Best Film Critic: I. Shanmughadas
- Dadasaheb Phalke Award: Hrishikesh Mukherjee
- Most awards: Hum Dil De Chuke Sanam (4)

The 47th National Film Awards, presented by Directorate of Film Festivals, the organisation set up by Ministry of Information and Broadcasting, India to felicitate the best of Indian Cinema released in the year 1999. Ceremony took place on 18 September 2000 and awards were given by then President of India, K. R. Narayanan.

== Awards ==
Awards were divided into feature films, non-feature films and books written on Indian cinema.

=== Lifetime Achievement Award ===
Name of Award	Image	Awardee(s)	Awarded As	Awards
Dadasaheb Phalke Award		Hrishikesh Mukherjee	director	Swarna Kamal, ₹ 100,000 and a Shawl

=== Feature films ===
Feature films were awarded at All India as well as regional level. For 47th National Film Awards, a Malayalam film, Vanaprastham won the National Film Award for Best Feature Film; whereas a Hindi film, Hum Dil De Chuke Sanam won the maximum number of awards (4). Following were the awards given in each category:

==== Juries ====
A committee headed by Gautam Ghose was appointed to evaluate the feature films awards. Following were the jury members:

- Jury Members
  - Gautam Ghose (Chairperson) • Kalpana Agarwal • Saeed Akhtar Mirza • Mohan Sharma • G. V. G. Raju • Gautami
  - K. Ravindranathan Nair • Sreelekha Mukherji • T. S. Nagabharana • K. Janaki Ram • Leslie Carvalho • Moloya Goswami
  - Arun Kaul • Ratnottama Sengupta • Sanjeev Bhargava • Ram Gopal Bajaj

==== All India Award ====
Following were the awards given:

===== Golden Lotus Award =====
Official Name: Swarna Kamal

All the awardees are awarded with 'Golden Lotus Award (Swarna Kamal)', a certificate and cash prize.

Name of Award	Name of Film	Language	Awardee(s)	Cash prize
Best Feature Film	Vanaprastham	Malayalam	Producer: Mohanlal; Director: Shaji N. Karun	₹ 50,000/- Each
Best Feature Film	Citation: For its multi layered treatment of issues like caste system, patronage to the arts, Guru Shishya Parampara, and the identity crisis of a performing artiste.			
Best Debut Film of a Director	Dollar Dreams	English	Producer: Sekhar Kammula; Director: Sekhar Kammula	₹ 12,500/- Each
Best Debut Film of a Director	Citation: For tacking in a very natural manner the burning problem of brain drain to the techno-logically developed world.			₹ 12,500/- Each
Best Debut Film of a Director	Laado	Haryanvi	Producer: Kumud Chaudhary; Director: Ashwini Chaudhary	₹ 12,500/- Each
Best Debut Film of a Director	Citation: For taking a bold stand over women's rights in the traditionally orthodox agricultural community of Haryana.			₹ 12,500/- Each
Best Popular Film Providing Wholesome Entertainment	Sarfarosh	Hindi	Producer: John Matthew Matthan; Director: John Matthew Matthan	₹ 40,000/- Each
Best Popular Film Providing Wholesome Entertainment	Citation: For its engrossing projection of an honest officer, who fights engineered subversion which fuels suspicion and sours relationship between two communities. A bold subject for the debut film of a director in mainstream cinema.			
Best Children's Film	Goal	Hindi	Producer: Children's Film Society; Director: Gul Bahar Singh	₹ 30,000/- Each
Best Children's Film	Citation: For stressing the sportsmanship of a small town coach who supports, without any bias, the raw talent of an underprivileged aspirant with no education and with a social stigma.			
Best Direction	Uttara	Bengali	Buddhadeb Dasgupta	₹ 50,000/-
Best Direction	Citation: For his skilful weaving together of different strands of life through metaphors, symbols and folk icons, to question the definition of humanity in our scoundrel times.			

===== Silver Lotus Award =====
Official Name: Rajat Kamal

All the awardees are awarded with 'Silver Lotus Award (Rajat Kamal)', a certificate and cash prize.

Name of Award	Name of Film	Language	Awardee(s)	Cash prize
Best Feature Film on National Integration	Shaheed Udham Singh	Punjabi	Producer: Iqbal Dhillon; Director: Chitraarth	₹ 30,000/- Each
Best Feature Film on National Integration	Citation: For opening a new window to the Jallianwala Bagh episode, which had jolted the conscience of the Indian people.			
Best Film on Family Welfare	Hari-Bhari	Hindi	Producer: Government of India; Director: Shyam Benegal	₹ 30,000/- Each
Best Film on Family Welfare	Citation: For unfolding several aspects of family life in an Indian Town where awareness of women's health and upbringing of girl-child is enveloped in ignorance and blind belief.			
Best Film on Other Social Issues	Kairee	Hindi	Producer: Government of India; Director: Amol Palekar	₹ 30,000/- Each
Best Film on Other Social Issues	Citation: For its charming portrayal of the need to give a secure future, through education, to the girl-child in the backwaters of the country.			
Best Film on Environment / Conservation / Preservation	Jalamarmaram	Malayalam	Producer: Latha Kurien Rajeev and Radhika Suresh Gopi; Director: T. K. Rajeev Kumar	₹ 30,000/- Each
Best Film on Environment / Conservation / Preservation	Citation: For handling a theme of great concern in the increasingly polluted environs of our industrial towns and cities, through the imaginative touch of a fairly tale.			
Best Actor	Vanaprastham	Malayalam	Mohanlal	₹ 10,000/-
Best Actor	Citation: For his nuanced portrayal of the identity crisis experienced by a performing artiste who, in his personal life too, is torn between the denial of both, paternal identity and his own paternity rights.			
Best Actress	Bariwali	Bengali	Kirron Kher	₹ 10,000/-
Best Actress	Citation: For the range of emotions she brings into play in living the role of an ageing woman whose unfulfilled desires make her a game for emotional exploitation by a dream-merchant.			
Best Supporting Actor	Hey Ram	Tamil	Atul Kulkarni	₹ 10,000/-
Best Supporting Actor	Citation: For his serious performance as a cold blooded fundamentalist stalking the cities during the turbulent years of partition that led to the assassination of Mahatma Gandhi.			
Best Supporting Actress	Bariwali	Bengali	Sudipta Chakraborty	₹ 10,000/- Each
Best Supporting Actress	Citation: For playing the zest for life of a maidservant who comes from the slums and lives in a Haveli.			₹ 10,000/- Each
Best Supporting Actress	Paromitar Ek Din	Bengali	Sohini Haldar	₹ 10,000/- Each
Best Supporting Actress	Citation: For breathing life into the schizophrenic daughter who knows she is a burden on her mother, but cannot help it.			₹ 10,000/- Each
Best Child Artist	Jalamarmaram	Malayalam	Aswin Thampy	₹ 10,000/-
Best Child Artist	Citation: For playing the innocent faith of a child in the existence of a mermaid, and his confident strides to provide it with a safe environment.			
Best Male Playback Singer	Vasanthiyum Lakshmiyum Pinne Njaanum ("Chanthupottum Chankelassum")	Malayalam	M. G. Sreekumar	₹ 10,000/-
Best Male Playback Singer	Citation: For a heartwarming rendition of the song.			
Best Female Playback Singer	Paromitar Ek Din ("Hridoy Amar Prokash Holo")	Bengali	Jayshree Dasgupta	₹ 10,000/-
Best Female Playback Singer	Citation: For soulful rendering by the singer expressing the inner world of a mentally challenged character in this film.			
Best Cinematography	Hum Dil De Chuke Sanam	Hindi	Cameraman: Anil Mehta; Laboratory Processing: Adlabs	₹ 10,000/- Each
Best Cinematography	Citation: For a wide range of tonal variations achieved by the cinematographer to express the changing moods of this musical in a given space and time.			
Best Screenplay	Karunam	Malayalam	Madampu Kunjukuttan	₹ 10,000/-
Best Screenplay	Citation: For expressing with extreme economy and skilful cinematic treatment a story based on a sensitive screenplay woven around an old couple.			
Best Audiography	Uttara	Bengali	Anup Mukhopadhyay	₹ 10,000/-
Best Audiography	Citation: For creating the ambience of sound in different layers to create an atmosphere in support of the stark visuals. The final mixed sound track has enhanced the effect of viewing the film enormously.			
Best Editing	Vanaprastham	Malayalam	A. Sreekar Prasad	₹ 10,000/-
Best Editing	Citation: For maintaining the required unity of form and content by putting images and sound tracks in perfect harmony and rhythm for this film.			
Best Art Direction	Hum Dil De Chuke Sanam	Hindi	Nitin Chandrakant Desai	₹ 10,000/-
Best Art Direction	Citation: For recreating the haveli ambience and matching it with the existing structure used, the décor of the sets and for recreating the best of life styles of the region.			
Best Costume Design	Hey Ram	Tamil	Sarika	₹ 10,000/-
Best Costume Design	Citation: For recreating a range of period costumes worn by characters from regions as varied as Lahore, Calcutta, Madras and Delhi and coming down to present times.			
Best Music Direction	Hum Dil De Chuke Sanam	Hindi	Ismail Darbar	₹ 10,000/-
Best Music Direction	Citation: For an innovative score that blends in the entire spectrum of Indian music form Classical to folk to embellish the musical narrative.			
Best Lyrics	Sangamam ("Mudhal Murai Killipparthaein")	Tamil	Vairamuthu	₹ 10,000/-
Best Lyrics	Citation: For the lyric "Mudhal Murai Killipparthaein" in the Tamil film Sangamam. In his own imitable style the renowned poet has imparted a certain lyrical charm to the song.			
Best Special Effects	Hey Ram	Tamil	Mantra	₹ 10,000/-
Best Special Effects	Citation: For judicious use of special effects to enhance the feel of living in the past and conversing with a legend of Indian history.			
Best Choreography	Hum Dil De Chuke Sanam ("Dholi Taro")	Hindi	• Sameer Tanna • Arsh Tanna • Vaibhavi Merchant	₹ 10,000/-
Best Choreography	Citation: For combining musical elements in the dance number skilfully composed by the choreographer to enrich visual opulence.			
Special Jury Award	Vasanthiyum Lakshmiyum Pinne Njaanum	Malayalam	Kalabhavan Mani (Actor)	₹ 25,000/-
Special Jury Award	Citation: For a sensitive and realistic portrayal of a blind man complete with his behavioural and gestural distortions as he copes with difficulties in making life meaningful.			
Special Mention	Gharabaher	Marathi	Mohan Joshi (Actor)	Certificate Only
Special Mention	Citation: For his wonderfully controlled performance of a corrupt politician.			Certificate Only
Special Mention	Baibhab	Assamese	Manju Borah (Director)	Certificate Only
Special Mention	Citation: For her poetic expression in her debut film.			Certificate Only
Special Mention	Deveeri	Kannada	Kavitha Lankesh (Director)	Certificate Only
Special Mention	Citation: For her exuberant debut as a director.			Certificate Only

==== Regional Awards ====
The award is given to best film in the regional languages in India.

Name of Award	Name of Film	Awardee(s)	Cash prize
Best Feature Film in Assamese	Pokhi	Producer: Dolphin Communications; Director: Jahnu Barua	₹ 20,000/- Each
Best Feature Film in Assamese	Citation: For beautifully structured film centred around the turmoil in the life of an orphan the film finely balances the demands of characterisation, perform-ance and storytelling to focus attention on the role played by the child in bringing about an attitudinal change in a selfish money lender.		
Best Feature Film in Bengali	Paromitar Ek Din	Producer: Rajesh Agarwal; Director: Aparna Sen	₹ 20,000/- Each
Best Feature Film in Bengali	Citation: For depicting the changing temper of society and the changing balances of human relationships very sensitively portrayed. The film highlights the changing equations between a mother-in-law and daughter-in-law, who begin as adversaries and become confidantes.		
Best Feature Film in Hindi	Shool	Producer: Nitin Manmohan and Ram Gopal Varma; Director: E. Nivas	₹ 20,000/- Each
Best Feature Film in Hindi	Citation: For unveiling the complete collapse of the socio-political system. A very effective portrayal of the determined fight of a single citizen in the centre of a façade of democracy.		
Best Feature Film in Kannada	Kanooru Heggadithi	Producer: H. G. Narayana, C. M. Narayana and I. P. Mallegowda; Director: Girish Karnad	₹ 20,000/- Each
Best Feature Film in Kannada	Citation: For depicting increasing gaps between generation and genders very sensitively portrayed through the three main female characters.		
Best Feature Film in Malayalam	Punaradhivasam	Producer: N. P. Prakash; Director: V. K. Prakash	₹ 20,000/- Each
Best Feature Film in Malayalam	Citation: For depicting an intricately structured screenplay about the need for discovering new adjustments in family relationship and the complexities and fallacies of conjugal harmony.		
Best Feature Film in Marathi	Gharabaher	Producer: Ratan Madan and Narendra Shinde; Director: Sanjay Surkar	₹ 20,000/- Each
Best Feature Film in Marathi	Citation: For depicting the hypocrisy exercised by man in complete contradiction of declared socio-political positions and a total reversal of behaviour when it comes to power and lust. It draws attention to the inherent problems in the empowerment of women.		
Best Feature Film in Odia	Biswaprakash	Producer: NFDC; Director: Susant Misra	₹ 20,000/- Each
Best Feature Film in Odia	Citation: For depicting the story of a young man in search of his identify and direction in life. The beautifully photo-graphed film depicts the lack of opportunities in a small town.		
Best Feature Film in Tamil	Sethu	Producer: A. Kandasamy; Director: Bala	₹ 20,000/- Each
Best Feature Film in Tamil	Citation: For an impressive debut by a director with a commendable grasp of the grammar of mainstream cinema. It deserves special mention for combining popular elements with the unconventional.		
Best Feature Film in Telugu	Kalisundam Raa	Producer: Daggubati Suresh Babu; Director: Uday Shankar	₹ 20,000/- Each
Best Feature Film in Telugu	Citation: For a conventionally structured film in the genre of mainstream cinema which conveys in an entertaining and wholesome manner a social message of togetherness and the need for preserving the unit of the joint family.		

=== Non-Feature Films ===
Short Films made in any Indian language and certified by the Central Board of Film Certification as a documentary/newsreel/fiction are eligible for non-feature film section.

==== Juries ====
A committee headed by Jabbar Patel was appointed to evaluate the non-feature films awards. Following were the jury members:

- Jury Members
  - Jabbar Patel (Chairperson) • Malay Bhattacharya • O. K. Johny • Meera Dewan • Rashmi Doraiswamy

==== Golden Lotus Award ====
Official Name: Swarna Kamal

All the awardees are awarded with 'Golden Lotus Award (Swarna Kamal)', a certificate and cash prize.

Name of Award	Name of Film	Language	Awardee(s)	Cash prize
Best Non-Feature Film	Dui Paatan Ke Beech Mein (Between the Devil and the Deep River)	Hindi	Producer: Arvind Sinha; Director: Arvind Sinha	₹ 20,000/- Each
Best Non-Feature Film	Citation: For its in-depth portrayal of an environmental disaster in North Bihar, of lives uprooted and rendered ‘amphibian’ due to the blind imposition of the development model of embankment of rivers.			

==== Silver Lotus Award ====
Official Name: Rajat Kamal

All the awardees are awarded with 'Silver Lotus Award (Rajat Kamal)' and cash prize.

Name of Award	Name of Film	Language	Awardee(s)	Cash prize
Best First Non-Feature Film	Deivangal Padiyirangumbol (When Gods Depart)	Tamil	Producer: Pradeep Kumar; Director: Pradeep Kumar	₹ 10,000/- Each
Best First Non-Feature Film	Citation: For its objective and well-researched point of view on the lives of tribes in the Wayanad region; it captures their fragile existence cause in the process of change.			
Best Anthropological / Ethnographic Film	Koihatir Dhulia	Assamese	Producer: Satyabrat Kalita; Director: Hemanta Das	₹ 10,000/- Each
Best Anthropological / Ethnographic Film	Citation: For its portrayal of the maestro Mohan Bhawria and his contribution to the revival of an art form from oblivion, its dissemination, and its incorporation of topical themes within a traditional art form.			₹ 10,000/- Each
Best Anthropological / Ethnographic Film	Surabhi	Telugu	Producer: K. Jaydev; Director: K. N. T. Sastry	₹ 10,000/- Each
Best Anthropological / Ethnographic Film	Citation: For being an important document of a family-community of theatre performers and of cultural growth within the community and its performances.			₹ 10,000/- Each
Best Biographical Film	Nottam	Malayalam	Producer: Bina Narayan; Director: M. R. Rajan	₹ 5,000/- Each
Best Biographical Film	Citation: For portraying the renowned Kathakali actor Kizhpadam Kumaran Nair, his valuable contribution to the art form, his devotion, dignity and his insights into nature, art and life.			₹ 5,000/- Each
Best Biographical Film	Mallika Sarabhai	English	Producer: Films Division; Director: Aruna Raje Patil	₹ 5,000/- Each
Best Biographical Film	Citation: For a vibrant presentation of a contemporary woman’s life and art, through the perspective of Mallika Sarabhai.			₹ 5,000/- Each
Best Arts / Cultural Film	"Thang Ta"- The Martial Art of Manipur	English	Producer: Indira Gandhi National Centre for the Arts; Director: Aribam Syam Sharma	₹ 10,000/- Each
Best Arts / Cultural Film	Citation: For its passionate cinematic expression of a traditional martial art of Manipur.			
Best Environment / Conservation / Preservation Film	And The Bamboo Blooms	English	Producer: Films Division; Director: Joshy Joseph	₹ 10,000/- Each
Best Environment / Conservation / Preservation Film	Citation: For its creative approach to the importance of bamboo in the economic and social lives of the people of Manipur and Mizoram.			
Best Film on Social Issues	Atanka Ka Andhakar (Darkness of Terror)	Hindi	Producer: Films Division; Director: Rajiv Kumar	₹ 10,000/- Each
Best Film on Social Issues	Citation: For its documentation of the social issue of caste politics and the ensuing ruthless violence in Bihar.			
Best Short Fiction Film	Blind Folded	Tamil	Producer: A. Sriram; Director: S. Sri Ram	₹ 10,000/- Each
Best Short Fiction Film	Citation: For its creative controlled treatment of an emotional and socially relevant theme.			
Best Cinematography	Kalamandalam Gopi	Malayalam	Cameraman: Mankada Ravi Varma; Laboratory Processing: Prasad Film Laboratories	₹ 10,000/- Each
Best Cinematography	Citation: For the imaginative and excellent visual quality rendered with consistency.			
Best Audiography	The Vehicle with a Soul of a Man		Chinmoy Nath	₹ 10,000/-
Best Audiography	Citation: For imaginatively capturing the hard labour and tediousness of the Pitthu through the sound design achieved through an appropriate synthesis of sound and silence.			
Best Editing	Of Confucius, S-Spots and Toyguns	English, Hindi, Marathi and Tamil	Ajit Kumar	₹ 10,000/-
Best Editing	Citation: For the creative and crisp juxtaposition of imagery which complements the theme of the film.			
Special Jury Award	Of Confucius, S-Spots and Toyguns	English, Hindi, Marathi and Tamil	Deep Prakash (Director)	₹ 10,000/-
Special Jury Award	Citation: For its stylised, graphic and playful narrative on modern life, violence and the contemporary media.			
Special Mention	Fire	English and Hindi	Vinod Subramanian (Director)	Certificate Only
Special Mention	Citation: For its imaginative and multifaceted presentation of the theme.			

=== Best Writing on Cinema ===
The awards aim at encouraging study and appreciation of cinema as an art form and dissemination of information and critical appreciation of this art-form through publication of books, articles, reviews etc.

==== Juries ====
A committee headed by K. Satchidanandan was appointed to evaluate the writing on Indian cinema. Following were the jury members:

- Jury Members
  - K. Satchidanandan (Chairperson) • Deepa Gahlot • Siladitya Sen

==== Golden Lotus Award ====
Official Name: Swarna Kamal

All the awardees are awarded with 'Golden Lotus Award (Swarna Kamal)' and cash prize.

Name of Award	Name of Book	Language	Awardee(s)	Cash prize
Best Book on Cinema	Malayala Cinemayum Sahithyavum	Malayalam	Author: Madhu Eravankara; Publisher: D. C. Books	₹ 15,000/- Each
Best Book on Cinema	Citation: For its in-depth analysis of the relationship between literature and film, its thorough understanding of the medium, rigorous research and high readability.			₹ 15,000/- Each
Best Book on Cinema	Marathi Chitrapat Sangeetachi Vatchal	Marathi	Author: Aruna Anant Damle; Publisher: Anil Damle	₹ 15,000/- Each
Best Book on Cinema	Citation: For its meticulous research its understanding of musical tradition in Marathi film and accessible style.			₹ 15,000/- Each
Best Film Critic		Malayalam	I. Shanmugha Das	₹ 15,000/-
Best Film Critic	Citation: For his understanding of the history of the art of cinema, his commitment to excellence in films, his grasp of film aesthetics and his originality of vision.			

==== Special Mention ====
All the award winners are awarded with Certificate of Merit.

Name of Award	Name of Book	Language	Awardee(s)	Cash prize
Special Mention (Book on Cinema)	Economic Aspects of Film Industry in Kerala	English	Author: Uma J. Nair	Certificate Only
Special Mention (Book on Cinema)	Citation: For its original interdisciplinary research.			

=== Awards not given ===
Following were the awards not given as no film was found to be suitable for the award:

- Best Feature Film in English
- Best Non-Feature Film Direction
- Best Agricultural Film
- Best Exploration / Adventure Film
- Best Film on Family Welfare
- Best Feature Film in Manipuri
- Best Scientific Film
- Best Historical Reconstruction / Compilation Film
- Best Investigative Film
- Best Music Direction
- Best Feature Film in Punjabi
- Best Promotional Film
- Best Educational / Motivational / Instructional Film
- Best Animation Film
