= National Film Award for Best Film on Social Issues =

Indian film award

- National award for contributions to non-feature films
- Sponsored by: Directorate of Film Festivals
- Formerly called: Best Film on Social Documentation (1967–1985)
- Rewards: Rajat Kamal (Silver Lotus); ₹50,000 (US$530)
- First award: 1967
- Final award: 2021
- Most recent winner: • Mithu Di Three Two One; • Three Two One

Highlights
- Total awarded: 45
- First winner: I am 20

The National Film Award for Best Film on Social Issues was one of the National Film Awards presented annually by the Directorate of Film Festivals, the organisation set up by Ministry of Information and Broadcasting, India. It was one of several awards presented for non-feature films and awarded with Rajat Kamal (Silver Lotus).

The award was instituted in 1967, at 15th National Film Awards and awarded annually for the short films produced in the year across the country, in all Indian languages. At the 70th National Film Awards, the award is discontinued and clubbed with National Film Award for Best Promotional Film, National Film Award for Best Scientific Film, National Film Award for Best Educational/Motivational/Instructional Film, National Film Award for Best Exploration/Adventure Film, National Film Award for Best Anthropological/Ethnographic Film, National Film Award for Best Agriculture Film, National Film Award for Best Investigative Film and National Film Award for Best Non-Feature Environment/Conservation/Preservation Film, and two new categories were created; Best Documentary and Best Non Feature Film Promoting Social and Environmental Values.

== Winners ==
Award includes 'Rajat Kamal' (Silver Lotus) and cash prize. Following are the award winners over the years:

Indicates a joint award for that year

List of films, showing the year, language(s), producer(s) and director(s)
Year	Film(s)	Language(s)	Producer(s)	Director(s)	Refs.
1967 (15th)	I am 20	English	J. S. Bhownagary and K. L. Khandpur for Films Division	S. N. S. Sastry	
1968 (16th)	Water	English	Fali Billmoria Productions	Fali Billmoria	
1969 (17th)	No Award				
1970 (18th)	Latest	English	Film-O-Pub	Biplab Ray Chaudhari	
1971 (19th)					
1972 (20th)	Transcedence	English	Pramod Patil for Films Division	K. Vishwanath for Films Division	
1973 (21st)	Land of Krishna	English	G. L. Bhardwaj	G. L. Bhardwaj	
1974 (22nd)	Behind the Breadline	English	Sukhdev	Sukhdev	
1975 (23rd)	Baster Rhythm of Progress	English	Chandrashekhar Nair	Chandrashekhar Nair	
1976 (24th)					
1977 (25th)	No Award				
1978 (26th)	No Award				
1979 (27th)					
1980 (28th)	No Award				
1981 (29th)	No Award				
1982 (30th)	No Award				
1983 (31st)	No Award				
1984 (32nd)	No Award				
1985 (33rd)	No Award				
1986 (34th)	Inner Instincts	English	Ministry of Welfare (India)	P. Vijay Kumar	
1987 (35th)	Sankalp	Hindi	Madhya Pradesh Film Development Corporation Ltd.	Rajendra Janglay	
1988 (36th)	Voices from Baliapal	English	Vector Productions	• Vasudha Joshi • Ranjan Palit	
1989 (37th)	The Limp in the Niche	English	Girish Karnad	Girish Karnad	
1990 (38th)	Safe Drinking Water for All	English	R. Krishna Mohan for Films Division	Mahesh P. Sinha	
1991 (39th)	Eyes of Stone	• Hindi • Marwari	Nilita Vachani	Nilita Vachani	
1992 (40th)	Choodiyan	Hindi	Sai Paranjpye for Films Division	Sai Paranjpye	
1993 (41st)	The Women Betrayed	English	• Sehjo Singh • Anwar Jamal	Sehjo Singh	
1994 (42nd)	Father, Son and Holy War (Part I: Trial by Fire, Part II: Hero Pharmacy)	• Hindi • English	Anand Patwardhan	Anand Patwardhan	
1995 (43rd)	Memories of Fear	• Hindi • English	• Flavia Agnes • Majlis Production	Madhushree Dutta	
1996 (44th)	Silent Screams: A Village Chronicle	English	Jose Sebastián	O. K. Johnny	
1997 (45th)	Matir Bhanr	Bengali	Anjana Ghosh Dastidar	Debananda Sengupta	
1998 (46th)	Malli	Tamil	Film and TV Institute of Tamil Nadu	R. Madhava Krisshnan	
1999 (47th)	Atanka Ka Andhakar (Darkness of Terror)	Hindi	Films Division	Rajiv Kumar	
2000 (48th)	Infiltrators	English	Urmi Chakraborty for Films Division	Urmi Chakraborty for Films Division	
2001 (49th)	A New Paradigm	English	Aruna Raje Patil	Aruna Raje Patil	
2002 (50th)	Avchetan	Hindi	• Prem Matiyani for Films Division • Ministry of Social Empowerment	Manisha Dwivedi	
2003 (51st)	Way Back Home	Bengali	Rajasri Mukhopadhyay	Supriyo Sen	
2004 (52nd)	Dwijaa	Marathi	Tripurari Sharan for FTII	Pankaj Purandare	
2005 (53rd)	Way To Dusty Death	• Hindi • English	Rajiv Mehrotra	Sayed Fayaz	
2006 (54th)	Children of Nomads	Hindi	Leoarts Communication	Meenakshi Vinay Rai	
2007 (55th)	Bagher Bacha	Bengali	Satyajit Ray Film and Television Institute	Bishnu Dev Halder	
2007 (55th)	Shifting Prophecy	English	Public Service Broadcasting Trust	Merajur Rahman Baruah	
2008 (56th)	The Female Nude	Hindi	Public Service Broadcasting Trust	• Hemjyotika • Devi Prasad Mishra	
2008 (56th)	Buru Gaara	Hindi	Public Service Broadcasting Trust	Shriprakash	
2009 (57th)	Mr. India	Manipuri	Haobam Paban Kumar	Haobam Paban Kumar	
2010 (58th)	Understanding Trafficking	• Bengali • Hindi • English	Cinemawoman	Ananya Chakraborti	
2011 (59th)	Mindscapes... of Love and Longing	• Hindi • English	Public Service Broadcasting Trust	Arun Chadha	
2011 (59th)	Inshallah, Football	• Kashmiri • Urdu • English	Javed Jaffrey	Ashvin Kumar	
2012 (60th)	Behind The Mist	Malayalam	Babu Kambrath	Babu Kambrath	
2013 (61st)	Gulabi Gang	• Hindi • Bundelkhandi	Torstein Grude	Nishtha Jain	
2014 (62nd)	Can't Take This Shit Anymore	English	Bhagirathi Films	Vinod Kapri	
2014 (62nd)	Daughters of Mother India	English	V2 Film & Design	Vibha Bakshi	
2015 (63rd)	Auto Driver	Manipuri	• Oinam Doren • Longjam Meena Devi	Longjam Meena Devi	
2016 (64th)	I am Jeeja	English	Rajiv Mehrotra	Swaty Chakraborty	
2016 (64th)	Sanath	Hindi	Priya Arun	Vasanth S. Sai	
2017 (65th)	I am Bonnie		Films Division of India	Farha Khatun, Satarupa Santra, Sourabh Kanti Dutta	
2017 (65th)	Veil Done		Juhi Bhatt	Rajiv Mehrotra	
2018 (66th)	Taala Te Kunjee	Punjabi	Simardeep Singh	Shilpi Gulati	
2019 (67th)	Holy Rights	Urdu	Priyanka Pradeep More	Farha Khatun	
2020 (68th)	Justice Delayed but Delivered	Hindi	Mandeep Chauhan	Kamakhya Narayan Singh	
2020 (68th)	Three Sisters	Bengali	Ratnaboli Ray	Putul Rafey Mahmood	
2021 (69th)	Mithu Di Three Two One		Asim Kumar Sinha	Asim Kumar Sinha	
2021 (69th)	Three Two One		Film and Television Institute of India	Himanshu Prajapati	
