= SNS Sastry =

Indian cinematographer, documentary filmmaker (1930-1978)

- Born: 1930
- Died: 1978
- Education: Government Film and Television Institute (GFTI), Bengaluru
- Occupations: cinematographer, documentary filmmaker
- Years active: 1950 to 1978

SNS Sastry was an Indian cinematographer and documentary filmmaker who was active from the 1950s to 1978. He is a winner of four national awards for Malwa (1963),One Day (1964),I Am 20 (1967), and And I Make Short Films (1968).

== Career ==
Sastry earned a diploma in cinematography from the Bengaluru Polytechnic, now the Government Film and Television Institute (GFTI), Bengaluru.

He joined Films Division India, the state-run film production and distribution unit, as a newsreel cameraman in the early 1950s. Over time, he became a director. For nearly three decades until 1978, Sastry made several documentaries for Films Division. The most notable among these are One Day (1964), I Am Twenty (1967), And I Make Short Films (1968), This Bit of That India (1972), The Burning Sun (1973), Our Indira (1973), and Flashback (1974).

Despite being state-sponsored, Sastry’s films are marked by a subtle criticism of the political, economic and social developments of the time. His works often feature gentle self-criticism, questioning mindsets, and resilient attitudes.

== Filmography ==
As director – documentaries

- Nagarjunakonda (1958)
- Call of the Kheda (1962)
- The Sons Who Served (1963)
- Malwa (1963)
- A Privilege (1963)
- One Day (1964)
- That Delta – That River (1965)
- NEFA: The Years of Promise (1965)
- Invitation to Enchantment (1965)
- Yet in Him We Trust (1966)
- Parambikulam - Aliyar Project (1966)
- The Sainik Schoolway (1967)
- Jai Jawan (1967)
- I Am Twenty (1967)
- The Capture of Haji Pir Pass (1968)
- And I Make Short Films (1968)
- On the Move (1970)
- Amir Khan (1970)
- We (1971)
- Keep Going (1971)
- Care...A Little More (1971)
- Yes, It's On (1972)
- Mining the White Gold (1972)
- He is Back (1972)
- The Burning Sun (1973)
- Our Indira (1973)
- Raga - I India (1974)
- Raga - II India (1974)
- Portrait of a Prime Minister (1974)
- Flashback (1974)
- Faces - India (1974)
- Somewhere in the Deep Woods (1975)
- Strides (1975)
- Take Off (1975)
- This Bit of That India (1975)
- We Have a Promise to Keep (1975)
- A Decade of Achievement (1976)
- Love in Action (1976)
- Not a Bed of Features (1976)
- Pragati Ke Das Saal (1976)
- The First Leap (1976)
- Naya Daur (1976)
- A Sister for Kittu (1978)

As cinematographer - documentaries

- Dr Vishveshawaraya
