= A Narmada Diary =

- Directed by: Anand Patwardhan; Simantini Dhuru
- Release date: 1995
- Country: India

A Narmada Diary is a 1995 documentary on the struggle of those adversely impacted by the Sardar Sarovar Dam project. It was directed by Anand Patwardhan and Simantini Dhuru and released in 1995. A record from about 1990–1993, of the measures adopted and hardship faced by the Narmada Bachao Andolan movement and the people inhabiting the place affected was presented.

The documentary won the Filmfare Award for Best Documentary at the 41st Filmfare Awards, and the Grand Prize at Earth-Vision Film Festival, Tokyo, 1996. It was also named the second best environmental film at the International Video Festival on Science, Society and Development organised by Government of Kerala's Centre for Development of Imaging Technology in Thiruvananthapuram in 1995. In spite of winning the central government's national awards, the film was not allowed to be shown on National television. In a report on The Hindu, a critic wrote that "the film is not free of the cliches that usually pervade Indian documentaries. Patwardhan and Dhuru remain coldly detached to the subject and the account lacks visual ingenuity."

== See also ==
- Drowned Out, a 2002 documentary film about opposition to the dam
