= Sukhdev Singh Sandhu =

Indian documentary filmmaker, cinematographer (1933–1979)

- Born: 1 October 1933; Dehradun
- Died: 1 March 1979 (aged 46); New Delhi
- Occupations: Indian documentary filmmaker, cinematographer
- Years active: 1955-1979
- Spouse: Kanta (wife)
- Children: Shabnam (daughter)

Sukhdev Singh Sandhu, also known as S. Sukhdev, Sukhdev, or Sukh, was an Indian documentary filmmaker and cinematographer active from the mid-1950s until his death in 1979. During this period, he made over 60 films, primarily documentaries, short films, and commercials.

Over the course of his career, Sukhdev won more than 35 international and national awards.

Sukhdev was posthumously honored with Bangladesh’s Friends of Liberation War Honor and was a recipient of India’s Padma Shri award.

== Early life ==
Sukhdev was born on 1 October 1933, in Dehradun, United Provinces, British India, to a family originally from Ludhiana. He attended Don Bosco High School in Matunga, Mumbai, where Shashi Kapoor was his junior. Later, he enrolled at Khalsa College, Mumbai.

== Career ==
Sukhdev was associated with the film company owned by the Kwatra brothers, Sardul Singh Kwatra and his brother Harcharan Singh, from the late 1940s to the early 1950s.

The Kwatra brothers were known for producing Punjabi films such as Posti (1950) and Kaude Shah (1953). Around 1955, Sukhdev worked as a camera assistant to the renowned German documentary filmmaker Paul Zils and his cinematographer Fali Bilimoria.

In 1958, he established his own production company in Mumbai. In the 1960s, following the relaxation of government policies on film production, distribution, and permissible topics, Sukhdev began collaborating with the Films Division of India.

Sukhdev's first documentary was The Evolution and Races of Man (1961), produced for the Films Division.

In 1963, painter Francis Newton Souza showcased his work in Mumbai for the first time in 15 years. That same year, Sukhdev made a seven-minute film on the celebrated modern artist. The short film introduced a fresh and experimental approach compared to conventional government documentaries, which tended to be either promotional or purely informative.

Next, in And Miles to Go (1965), Sukhdev employed montage and bang-cuts to vividly contrast the lifestyles of the rich and the destitute. An Indian Day/India '67 is a wordless broad view of Indian life and its social and political landscape two decades after independence. Nine Months to Freedom: The Story of Bangladesh (1972) uses graphic footage, including a shot of a dog eating a human corpse, to convey the harsh reality of the 1971 Bangladesh War. The film had a positive reception in cinema halls, especially in Delhi.

After the Silence (1977), shot immediately after the Emergency (June 1975 - March 1977), explored the severe effects of bonded labor in Palamau, present-day Jharkhand.

Sukhdev’s documentary style was considered unconventional and provocative, and as a result, he often faced heavy censorship from the authorities. And Miles to Go was censored for being too radical.

After The Eclipse (1967) explored the realities of prison life and was shot in real-life settings like a documentary, with Sukhdev himself realistically playing the role of an inmate. However, it was not accepted as a documentary by the Films Division since it included performed scenes or dramatization. Fearing exposure of their bonded labor practices, bonded slave owners tried to use political influence to prevent After The Silence from being widely shown.

During the years surrounding the Emergency, there were instances when Sukhdev gave in to the authorities, either by choice, ideological conviction, or due to the pressures of the time. Films with a clearly pro-government tone, such as Voice of the People and A Few More Questions (both 1974), and Thunder of Freedom (1976), were made during this period.

In the post-Emergency era, after the change of government, government projects were no longer commissioned to Sukhdev between March 1977 and March 1979. However, he continued to shoot films for public-sector companies like Bharat Heavy Electricals Limited (BHEL), Hindustan Machine Tools (HMT), and Bharat Earth Movers Limited (BEML), along with some private companies.

Sukhdev ventured into mainstream Hindi cinema with My Love (1970), starring Shashi Kapoor and Sharmila Tagore, but struggled to find commercial success. The 1971 Hindi film Reshma Aur Shera, directed by Sunil Dutt, also includes uncredited work by Sukhdev.

== Awards and honors ==
- 1962 - The Evolution And Races Of Man received the All India Certificate of Merit for the Second Best Documentary Film.
- 1964 - And Miles To Go received the All India Certificate of Merit for the Second Best Documentary Film.
- 1965 - And Miles To Go won the Bengal Tiger Award at the Third International Film Festival of India (IFFI).
- 1967 - India '67 received the National Film Award for Best Non-Feature Film.
- 1968 - Sukhdev was conferred India’s Padma Shri award in recognition of his work as a documentary filmmaker.
- 1968 - India '67 won the Diploma of Merit at the 22nd Edinburgh International Film Festival and the Filmfare Award for Best Documentary. It also competed for the Golden Bear at the Berlin Film Festival.
- 1973 - Nine Months To Freedom won the Filmfare Award for Best Documentary.
- 1974 - Behind The Breadline won the National Award for Best Film on Social Documentation.
- 1975 - Sukhdev was a member of the Main Competition jury at the 25th Berlin International Film Festival.

== Death ==
Sukhdev died at the age of 46 in New Delhi on 1 March 1979, while working at the Center for Educational Technology (CIET) in New Delhi. He was reportedly mixing the soundtracks of a documentary film at the time.

== Personal ==
Sukhdev was married to Kanta. Their daughter Shabnam is a documentary filmmaker and a Film and Television Institute of India (FTII) alumnus.

Both Kanta and Shabnam, then a one-year-old, featured in After the Eclipse (1965).

Shabnam's film The Last Adieu, a tribute to her father and his works, received the National Award for Best Biographical Film in 2013.Ishaa Journals (2008) and Stranger In My Own Skin (2006) are some of her other documentaries.

== Filmography ==
As director - documentaries

- Wazir the Kaghzi (1958)
- The Saint and the Peasant (1960)
- The Evolution and the Races of Man (1961)
- Castor (1962)
- Man the Creator (1964)
- Frontiers of Freedom (1964)
- Kal Udaas Na Hogi (1965)
- And Miles to Go (1965)
- Wild Life in India (1966)
- Homage to Lal Bahadur Shastri (1967)
- After the Eclipse (1967)
- India ‘67/An Indian Day (1968)
- Thoughts in a Museum (1968)
- Tomorrow May Be Too Late (1970)
- Kathak (1970)
- Khilonewala (1971)
- A Village Smiles (1971)
- Nine Months to Freedom: The Story of Bangladesh (1972)
- You Must Be Your Own Policemen (1972)
- Co-operation is Success (1973)
- Violence: What Price? Who Pays? (1974)
- Behind the Breadline (1974)
- A Few More Questions (1974)
- Maa Ki Pukar (1975)
- Thunders of Freedom (1976)
- New World of Power (1977)
- After the Silence (1977)
- Shaira (1980) – completed by Gulzar

As cinematographer/editor - documentaries

- After the Eclipse (1967)
- India ‘67/An Indian Day (1968)

As director - feature films

- My Love (1970)
- Reshma Aur Shera – uncredited work
