= Baba Lal Das =

Hindu priest

- Title: Mahant (Chief Priest)

Personal life
- Died: 16 November 1993 Ranipur Chattar village, near Ayodhya, India
- Cause of death: Murder (Disputed)
- Known for: First Mahant of Ram Lalla at Babri Masjid; vocal critic of the Ram Janmabhoomi movement and the demolition of the Babri Masjid

Religious life
- Religion: Hinduism

Religious career
- Period in office: 1981 - 1992 (Disputed)
- Predecessor: (Position created)
- Successor: Satyendra Das

Baba Lal Das (died 16 November 1993) was the first Mahant (Chief Hindu Priest) of the idols of the deity Rama placed within the Babri Masjid complex in Ayodhya. He was appointed to his position by the Lucknow High Court in 1981. Lal Das was a fierce critic of Rashtriya Swayamsevak Sangh (RSS), Bharatiya Janata Party (BJP) Vishva Hindu Parishad and Bajrang Dal, and he criticized these groups in the 1992 documentary Ram ke Naam.

Lal Das was also a fervent adversary of the L. K. Advani-led Rath Yatra; this was published as 'Priest asks Advani to halt yatra’ in Times of India in 30 October 1990. He branded the entire Ram Mandir movement as a gimmick to gain Hindu votes in Indian elections. Instead, he spoke about the number of Hindu temples which were funded and built in Ayodhya by the Muslim rulers of Awadh.

In an interview with human rights lawyer Flavia Agnes, he moreover accused that huge sums of money collected in the name of Ram Janmabhoomi Nyas, were later embezzled by various political leaders of upper caste origins, for their personal gain. This allegation was later corroborated by the likes of Jnandas, Hanuman Garhiya Mahant and Vishwanath Prasad Acharya.

Lal Das was illegally removed from his position by the Uttar Pradesh government led by Kalyan Singh of Bharatiya Janata Party in 1 March 1992, because he was extremely critical of the entire Ram Mandir Movement and was ultimately replaced by the priest of their own choosing like Satyendra Das, who was more acquiescent to BJP party leaders directives. He later challenged this non licet decision of his removal by the BJP government, in Lucknow bench of Allahabad High Court.

Shortly afterwards his removal, in December 1992, the Babri Masjid was demolished. He also became a key witness in the suit brought against leaders of the Vishwa Hindu Parishad and the BJP by the Central Bureau of Investigation (CBI).

After receiving multiple death threats, Lal Das sought police protection from the Kalyan Singh government, but his appeal was denied. In an interview with reporter Madhu Kishwar, he stated that over fifty priests had been assassinated throughout Ayodhya. He said, "I wonder how a person like me is still alive" during the conversation.

On 16 November 1993, Lal Das was shot dead in the middle of the night in Ranipur Chattar village, 20 km from Ayodhya while he was performing ablution, under sceptical circumstances. The CBI took over the investigation of the case in 1994 and charged two people for murder over a land dispute. At the time of his death, a case he had brought to the High Court challenging his dismissal had yet to be resolved. Lal Das was seen as a promoter of religious harmony between Hindus and Muslims in the region.
