= Ram Ke Naam =

1992 Indian film by Anand Patwardhan

Ram ke Naam In the Name of God
- Directed by: Anand Patwardhan
- Produced by: Anand Patwardhan
- Edited by: Anand Patwardhan
- Release date: September 1992 (Film South Asia)
- Running time: 75 minutes
- Country: India
- Languages: English, Hindi

Ram ke Naam (English: In the Name of God) is a 1992 documentary by Indian filmmaker Anand Patwardhan. The film explores the campaign waged by the right-wing Hindutva organisation Vishva Hindu Parishad to build a temple to the Hindu deity Ram at the site of the Babri Masjid in Ayodhya, as well as the communal violence that it triggered. A couple of months after Ram ke Naam was released, activists of the VHP and other Hindu nationalist groups demolished the Babri Masjid in 1992, provoking further violence. The film earned Patwardhan a wide recognition, and received several national and international awards.

== Background ==
In 1526 following the Mughal invasion of the Indian subcontinent, Mir Baqi, a general of the emperor Babur, built a mosque at Ayodhya which he named after Babur. Hindus believe that Ayodhya is the birthplace of the deity Rama. Local traditions hold that a temple to Rama stood at the site and was demolished by Baqi. The site was used for religious purposes by people of both beliefs until 1949. In that year, idols of Rama were surreptitiously placed inside the mosque. An uproar followed, and multiple civil suits were filed laying claim to the site. The site was declared to be in dispute, and the gates to the mosque were locked.

In the 1980s, the Vishva Hindu Parishad (VHP), a Hindu nationalist organisation, began a campaign to build a temple dedicated to Rama at the site, with the Bharatiya Janata Party (BJP) backing the movement politically. In September 1990, the BJP leader L. K. Advani began a "rath yatra," or chariot journey, to the city of Ayodhya in support of the movement. The journey triggered communal riots in several cities, leading to Advani's arrest by the government of Bihar. A large number of volunteers nonetheless reached Ayodhya, and attacked the mosque. This resulted in a pitched battle with government's paramilitary forces that ended with the death of several VHP volunteers.

== Synopsis ==
Ram ke Naam explores the VHP's campaign to demolish the Babri Masjid and build a temple to Rama in its place. The film begins with a clip of an organizer describing Advani's rath yatra in 1990. It then shows scenes from the yatra, with young men dressed in saffron seen in Ayodhya, followed by a video prepared by the VHP. The video depicts an incident at the temple in 1949, when an idol of Rama "appeared" inside the mosque. In the VHP's retelling, Rama is shown descending from the sky and miraculously appearing in the mosque, watched by astonished spectators, followed by a member of the VHP telling the same story.

The documentary then shifts to interviews with Muslim residents, who state that they do not have access to justice, and describe the destruction that occurred during communal riots in 1986. Patwardhan then interviews young male members of the VHP, who say that they will take Ayodhya by force if they need to. One of the men is unable to answer a question about historicity of Rama's date of birth. The film then shows Advani's yatra entering the state of Bihar, and several provocative speeches by politicians of the BJP. This is followed by an interview with a tax inspector, who was fired for objecting to irregularities in the tax returns of the VHP. Patwardhan interviews Baba Lal Das, a Hindu priest of the idols within the mosque compound, who described the VHP's agitation as unnecessary, and an attempt to create religious tension. The film concludes with a clip of people at a BJP rally attempting to justify the assassination of Mahatma Gandhi by Nathuram Godse.

== Reception and analysis ==
The film received a positive reception from critics, and also received several national and international awards. A review in the magazine Manushi stated that the film was a reminder of "that rare commodity called truth," and went on to say that although the film might be considered to have flaws of a technical nature, it should be mandatory viewing for people who wished to understand the Ayodhya dispute.

The VHP and its affiliates in the Sangh Parivar reacted with hostility to the film, stating that it was "anti-Hindu." In 1993 volunteers of the Akhil Bharatiya Vidyarthi Parishad and the Rashtriya Swayamsevak Sangh prevented the documentary from being screened at a college in Mumbai. In 2002, the VHP also prevented the movie from being screened at the American Museum of Natural History. After a screening of the documentary at ILS Law College on 27 December 2014 was cancelled due to threats from right wing organisations, Patwardhan officially released the documentary on YouTube. In February 2019, YouTube put an age restriction on the documentary which now opens with a disclaimer saying it may be “inappropriate for some users” even though the film holds a U certificate (for unrestricted public exhibition) from the Central Board of Film Certification. In August 2019, a screening of the film at the Hyderabad Central University was interrupted and the organisers were detained by police.

Patwardhan was already fairly well known thanks to his earlier films, such as Prisoners of Conscience, which critiqued the state of emergency imposed by Prime Minister Indira Gandhi in the mid 1970s. However, Ram Ke Naam earned him a wide recognition for the first time. Patwardhan also alleged that actors Amitabh Bachchan and Jaya Bachchan had told the authorities of the Berlin International Film Festival that they should not have selected such an "anti-India" film.

== Awards ==
- Filmfare Award for Best Documentary, India, 1992
- National Film Award, Best Investigative Documentary, India, 1992
- Ecumenical Prize, Nyon, Switzerland, 1993
- Documentary Prize, Fribourg International Film Festival, Switzerland, 1993
- Citizen’s Prize, Yamagata International Documentary Film Festival, Japan, 1992
