= My Love (1970 film) =

- Directed by: S. Sukhdev,Sukhdev Singh Sandhu
- Starring: Shashi Kapoor; Sharmila Tagore
- Cinematography: Kamal Bose
- Music by: Daan Singh
- Release date: 18 September 1970
- Country: India
- Language: Hindi

My Love is a 1970 Hindi-language romance film directed by S. Sukhdev. The film stars Shashi Kapoor and Sharmila Tagore. This was the first Hindi film that was shot in Kenya & Tanzania

== Plot ==
The plot revolves around the life of musician Raj Kumar Rai lives in Nairobi. He meets Sangeeta in a function and fells in love with her. On the other hand, Rani Mehta loves Raj Kumar.

== Cast ==
- Shashi Kapoor as Raj Kumar Rai
- Sharmila Tagore as Sangeeta Thakur
- Nirupa Roy as Durga
- Madan Puri as Pran Mehra
- Rajendra Nath as Tom Genda
- Azra as Rani Mehta
- Laxmi Chhaya as Laxmi
- Raj Mehra as Mr. Mehta
- Jayant as Mr. Rai
- Iftekhar as Doctor
- Sulochana Chatterjee as Sangeeta's Mother
- Manorama as Tom's Mother
- Pinchoo Kapoor as Tom's Father

== Soundtrack ==
All lyrics were penned by Anand Bakshi.

Song	Singer
"Woh Tere Pyar Ka Gham"	Mukesh
"Zikr Hota Hai Jab Qayamat Ka"	Mukesh
"Tum Mera Pyar Ho, My Love"	Mohammed Rafi
"Sunate Hai Sitare" (Happy)	Asha Bhosle
"Sunate Hai Sitare" (Sad)	Asha Bhosle
"Bheegi Bheegi Raat Mein"	Asha Bhosle
"Guzar Gaye Jo Haseen"	Asha Bhosle

== Reception ==
The reviewer for The Indian Express called the film a "lukewarm, lifeless affair irredeemable even by Shashi Kapoor's sterling performance."
