= Testimony of Ana =

Short documentary

- Directed by: Sachin Dheeraj
- Produced by: Sachin Dheeraj; Janani Vijayanathan
- Starring: Anaben Pawar
- Edited by: Sachin Dheeraj
- Release date: November 2021
- Country: India
- Language: Dangi

Testimony of Ana is an Indian short documentary film about a Gujarati woman who was branded a witch and attacked by villagers in 2017 in a tribal area of Gujarat. It was directed and produced by Sachin Dheeraj Mudigonda. The film has received several accolades including a National Film Awards for Best Non-Feature Film at the 68th National Film Awards. It was also qualified for the Oscars after winning the top prize at the International Documentary and Short Film Festival of Kerala (IDSFFK).

== Synopsis ==
The documentary recounts the story of an elderly tribal woman Anaben Pawar who was accused of witchcraft in rural India. Through this film the director Sachin has shown a deep-rooted culture of patriarchy and one of the most monstrous attacks on women's bodies in modern India.

== Screening ==
The film premiered at various national and international film festivals including Hot Docs Canadian International Documentary Festival, Kraków Film Festival, Festival, EnergaCAMERIMAGE International Film Festival, Imagine India International Film, International Documentary and Short Film Festival of Kerala, Indian Documentary Film Festival of Bhubaneswar, Raindance Film Festival, and Verzió International Human Rights Documentary Film Festival.

== Awards and nominations ==
Year	Award	Category	Result	Ref
2021	Tasveer South Asian Film Festival	Best Social Justice Short Film	Won	
2021	International Documentary and Short Film Festival of Kerala	Best Short Documentary	Won	
2021	National Film Awards	Best Non-Feature Film	Won	
2021	SiGNS Film Festival of Kerala	Special Mention	Won	
2021	Indie Meme Film Festival	Best Short Film	Won	
