= Father, Son, and Holy War =

1995 Indian film by Anand Patwardhan

- Film poster
- पितृ, पुत्र और धर्मयुद्ध
- Directed by: Anand Patwardhan
- Produced by: Anand Patwardhan
- Music by: Navnirman, Vinay Mahajan
- Release date: 1995
- Running time: 120 minutes
- Country: India
- Languages: English, Hindi

Father, Son, and Holy War (Pitra, Putra, aur Dharmayuddha) is a 1995 film by Indian documentary filmmaker Anand Patwardhan. The film is shot in two parts, with the first (Trial by Fire) examining the link between the violence of the Hindu nationalist movement, such as the demolition of the Babri Masjid, and sexual violence against women. The second part (Hero Pharmacy) looks at the nature of masculinity in contemporary urban India, and its role in encouraging sexual violence. As with other films of his, Patwardhan had to fight multiple court battles in order to force the national carrier Doordarshan to screen the film, a screening which eventually occurred on the orders of the Supreme court. The film received numerous national and international awards, and was also seen positively by critics.

== Synopsis ==
=== Part 1: Trial by Fire ===
The title of the first section is a reference to the ordeal that the Hindu god-king Rama used to test the fidelity of his wife after rescuing her from the demon king Ravana. The segment describes the various interconnected instances of communal violence in India in the years prior to the film. The film opens with the aftermath of the anti-Muslim riots in Bombay that followed the demolition of the Babri Masjid in December 1992. Several Hindu youth are heard speaking to the cameraman, saying that they had enjoyed the killing and looting, and that a list of Muslim individuals had been prepared beforehand, and that some authority figures knew of the plans to target Muslims.

The film then describes a connection between the Indian nationalist movement and violent masculinity. In a voice-over, Patwardhan states that as a result of the British Raj stereotypes of "effeminate" Hindus and "martial" non-Hindu communities, the nationalist movement turned to militant symbols like Shivaji and Rama. This led to an identification of Hinduism with the traditions of communities with more militant traditions, such as the Rajputs and the Marathas, which included practices like sati. This leads to a description of the murder of Roop Kanwar in Deorala, Rajasthan, in 1987. Kanwar was forced to immolate herself on the funeral pyre of her husband, supposedly in keeping with the tradition of sati, a practice that had been illegal since 1830.

The documentary then goes on to describe how the identification of Hinduism with militant traditions also resulted in all opponents of Hindutva, including secular leaders and Muslims, as weak and effeminate. The film depicts several public rallies and speeches in which Hindu leaders use misogynistic language while criticizing Muslims. Instances of misogyny and intolerance in other religious groups is also depicted, with footage of Sikhs demonstrating in favor of Khalistan, and the Fatwa issues against Salman Rushdie.

=== Part 2: Hero Pharmacy ===
The second segment of the documentary depicts common icons of masculinity, and explores their connection to misogyny and sexuality. Specifically, the film focuses on symbols of masculinity that are phallic in nature. Many political leaders are heard linking non-violence and secularism to weakness and impotency. A religious leader campaigning for the Shiv Sena in Gujarat is seen asking Hindu women to have eight children apiece, as a means of combating the perceived menace of Muslims.

The film shows the visits of several western cultural icons to Mumbai, and the hero-worshiping reactions they generated among male youth from different backgrounds. The film then looks at aggressive and violent depictions of masculinity on television, both in Bollywood movies and in WWE wrestling, and at reasons for their popularity. Examples of young children from different class backgrounds are shown exhibiting behavior that idolizes violence. Upper class children are shown mobbing professional wrestler Randy Savage, more commonly known by his stage name of "Macho Man", while young male members of the Shiv Sena, from less wealthy backgrounds, are shown engaged in street-fighting. Several young men are heard off-screen describing how watching rape in movies was "fun", and discussing the possibility of gang-raping a woman that they are not acquainted with.

== Reception ==
The film was completed in 1994, and released the next year. It won two national awards and multiple international awards in the years that followed. In 2004, the European DOX magazine listed it as one of the 50 most memorable documentaries of all time. As with previous films produced by Patwardhan, the national television channel Doordarshan initially refused to screen the film. Patwardhan challenged this decision in the Bombay High Court, which ruled in his favor in 2001, ordering Doordarshan to telecast the film. The carrier challenged this decision in the Indian Supreme Court, which ruled in Patwardhan's favor in 2006, ordering that the film be screened without any cuts within eight weeks. The judges observed that "This documentary film [...] showcases a real picture of crime and violence against women and members of various religious groups perpetrated by politically motivated leaders for political, social and personal gains." The film was eventually screened following the ruling.

History professor Vinay Lal, writing in the European art journal Third Text, stated that Father, Son, and Holy War was a nuanced and daring film, that examined the "nexus between communalism, the changing culture of the contemporary Hindi film, violence towards women in many domains of Indian society, vernacular forms of masculinity, and other aspects of Indian society and culture." However, he said that film made a crude distinction between patriarchy and matriarchy, and had a simplistic view of historical matriarchal societies. At the same time, Lal referred to Patwardhan as the most astute and sensitive documentary makers in his portrayals of Hindu communalism and the sexual aspects of its ideology. Gail Minault, reviewing the film for the Journal of South Asian Studies, wrote that the film was "powerful" and "harrowing."

== Awards ==
- National Film Award, Best Investigative Documentary, India, 1995
- National Film Award, Best Film on Social Issues, India, 1995
- Special Jury Prize, Yamagata International Documentary Film Festival, Japan, 1995
- In The Spirit of Freedom Award, Jerusalem International Film Festival, Israel, 1995
- Special Jury Prize, Vancouver International Film Festival, 1995
- International Jury Prize, Bombay International Film Festival, 1996
- Audience award, Sheffield International Documentary Festival, 2012
