= Bhagwan Das Garga =

Indian filmmaker

- Born: 14 November 1924; Lehragaga, Punjab Province, British India
- Died: 18 July 2011 (aged 86); Patiala, Punjab, India
- Occupations: Filmmaker; film historian
- Years active: 1940s–2011

Bhagwan Das Garga (14 November 1924 – 18 July 2011), also known as B. D. Garga, was an Indian documentary filmmaker and film historian.

== Life ==
Garga grew up in Lahore and developed an interest in photography as a teenager. He published some of his photographs in the magazine Illustrated Weekly of India. In 1943, he went to Mumbai and worked in the Indian film industry for the director V. Shantaram, where he learned the film craft. There he met the journalist and film critic K. A. Abbas, who encouraged him to write an article on the history of Indian cinema for Abbas' original magazine Sargam.

In 1948, Garga shot his first of more than 50 documentaries, which he also wrote and produced. His cinematic interest led him to Europe in 1953, where he studied film-making at the Ealing Studios and established contacts with the British Film Institute and the Cinémathèque française. Henri Langlois was a lifelong friend of his, and after Langlois's death in 1977 he wrote the obituary in the magazine Filmfare, in which he praised him as the greatest promoter of world cinema. During his five-year period in Europe, Garga also traveled to the Soviet Union and supported Abbas at the Mosfilm studios working on the Soviet-Soviet filming trip over three seas (1957). He also co-operated with film historians and archivists.

Garga's research and writing was about film; his research on Indian film history culminated in the first film anthology on the occasion of the 50th anniversary of Indian film. Garga was a member of the expert UNESCO committee on the history of international film. In 1969, he organized the first retrospective of Indian cinema with the Cinémathèque française. He was a member of the Film Advisory Board of India and a founding member of the National Film Archive of India in Pune. He also published essays on various aspects of Indian cinema, according to the NFDC magazine Cinema in India. The state Indian film promotion honored him for the 75th anniversary of Indian film in 1988 with a prize for his contribution to the growth of the national film industry. Garga was a jury member of national and international film festivals.

In 1992 Garga moved with his wife from Mumbai to Goa. At the Mumbai International Film Festival in 1996, he was awarded the V. Shantaram Award for his work in the documentary film. For his book From Raj to Swaraj: The Non-Fiction Film in India on the history of the Indian documentary, he received a National Film Award for the best Indian book on Film of the Year in 2007. Garga sold his unique private collection of about 3000 film memorabilia shortly before his death for 20 million rupees to the Indira Gandhi National Center for the Arts in New Delhi. His last book, Silent Cinema, in India: A Pictorial Journey was released in 2012 and was also awarded the National Film Award.

== Bibliography ==
- The Present-Day Situation and Future Prospects of the Feature Film in India, Paris: UNESCO, 1961
- Sound Track in the Indian Film, Paris: UNESCO, 1966
- So Many Cinemas: The Motion Picture in India, 1996
- The Art of Cinema: An Insider’s Journey Through Fifty Years of Film History, 2005
- From Raj to Swaraj: The Non-Fiction Film in India, 2007
- Silent Cinema in India: A Pictorial Journey, 2012

== Filmography ==
- 1948: Storm over Kashmir
- 1960: Family Planning – Why?
- 1964: Creative Artists of India – Satyajit Ray
- 1968: The Dance of Shiva (cowritten with Chidananda Dasgupta)
- 1969: Creative Artists of India – Amrita Sher-Gil
- 1975: Sarojini Naidu
- 1978: It Is Indian, It Is Good
- 1981: Bombay – A City at Stake
- 1985: Writing Off the Raj
- Mamallapuram
