= Rashmi Doraiswamy =

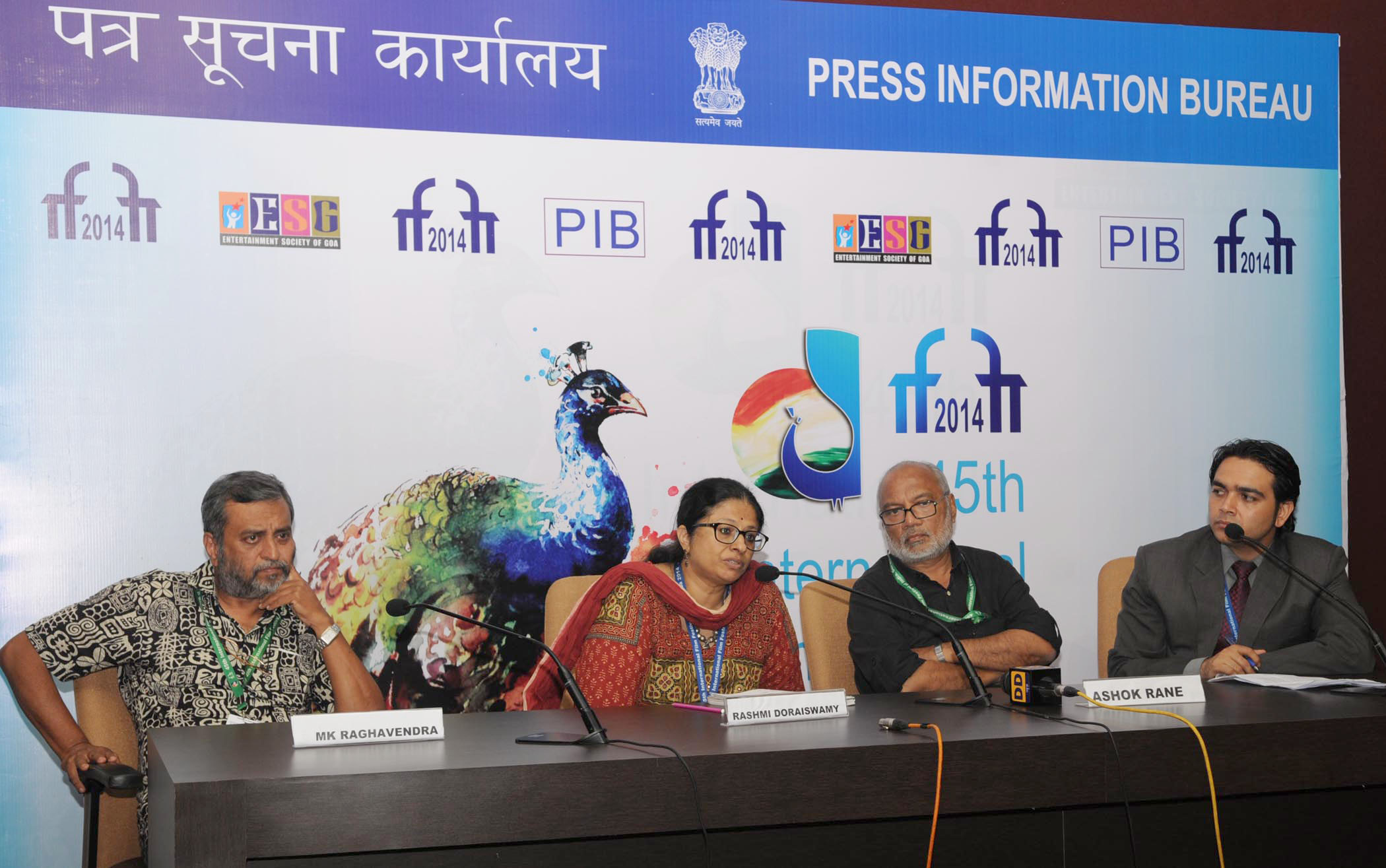
- Rashmi Doraiswamy, IFFI (2014)
- Born: India
- Occupation: Film critic
- Awards: National Film Award

Dr Rashmi Doraiswamy is a National Film Award winning film critic. She received her M. Phil from the Centre for Russian Studies, Jawaharlal Nehru University (Delhi, India) for her dissertation, 'A Critique of Mikhail Bakhtin's Theory of Literature in the Context of Contemporary Theories of Literature and the Formalist School of the 20s'. She is currently Professor (Central Asia) at the MMAJ Academy of International Studies, Jamia Millia Islamia

== Books ==
- Co-editor - Being and Becoming: The Cinemas of Asia (Macmillan, 2002).
- Co-author - Encyclopedia of Postcolonial Literatures in English (Chapter: ‘Film and Literature (India)'; Routledge, 2005)
- Co-author - Image and Imagination: Reconstructing the Nation, in ‘India: A National Culture (SAGE Publications, 2003)
- Co-author - Hindi Commercial Cinema: Changing Narrative Strategies in Frames of Mind: Reflections on Indian Cinema (ed. Aruna Vasudev), UBS Publication, 1995
- Co-author - Idiocy and Civilisation: A Study of Dostoevsky's The Idiot in The Russian Enigma (ed. Madhavan Palat and Geeti Sen, UBS Publications, 1994)
- Author - The Post-Soviet Condition: Chingiz Aitmatov in the '90s (Aakar, 2005).

== Translations (Russian To English) ==
- Piranesi, Sergei Eisenstein, Excerpts from his book ‘Non-Indifferent Nature', Cinemaya 2, 1989
- Distanced Montage/A Theory of Distance, Artavazd Peleshyan, Cinemaya 3, 1989
- Ishmukhamedov's Shok, Djhura Teshabaev, Cinemaya 8, 1990
- Landmarks in Tadjik cinema, Ato Akhrorov, Cinemaya 13, 1991
- Trying Times: Women Directors in the Asian Republics, Andrei Plakhov, Cinemaya 27, 1995
- Lessons from the East, Andrei Plakhov, Cinemaya 41,1998
- Women behind the camera in Kazakh Cinema, Cinemaya 42, 1998
- Evgeny Margolit, ‘Cinemas of Central Asia', in Being and Becoming, Macmillan, New Delhi, 2002
- L Trotsky's Theory of Imperialism and the Universal Crisis of Capitalism, V Serebryakov

== Awards and accolades ==
- MAJLIS research fellowship for project entitled ‘Changing Narrative Strategies of hindi Cinema'.
- Certificate of Appreciation by Tadjik Filmmakers' Union, for the active promotion of Tajik cinema.
- National Film Award for Best Film Critic

== Jury duty ==
- Selection committee member, Foreign films - IFFI-2005
- Selection committee member - Talent Campus India (part of Berlin Film Festival/Cinefan scout for young filmmakers from India)
- Member, Feature Film Jury - National Film Awards
- Member, Book Jury - National Film Awards
- Member, 54th National Film Awards
- Member, FIPRESCI Jury - Sochi International Film Festival
- Member - Kinotavr Open Russian Film Festival
- Member - National Film Awards for Non-Feature Films
- FIPRESCI Jury - Toronto International Film Festival
- NETPAC Jury - Taiwan International Documentary Festival
- Member of the jury - Mumbai International Film Festival
- Member of the jury - Mannheim International Film Festival

== See also ==
- Film Critics Circle of India
