= Bombay: Our City =

1985 film by Anand Patwardhan

- Directed by: Anand Patwardhan
- Cinematography: Ranjan Palit, Anand Patwardhan, Pervez Merwanji
- Edited by: Anand Patwardhan, Ramesh Asher, Sanjiv Shah
- Release date: 1985
- Running time: 75 minutes
- Country: India
- Languages: English; Hindi; Marathi

Bombay: Our City (Hamara Sahar) is a 1985 Indian documentary film directed by Anand Patwardhan. The film story based on daily battle for survival of the 4 million slum dwellers of Bombay who make up half the city's population, and also focuses on the slum demolitions in the early 1980s especially the slaughterhouse slums next to the railway tracks in Bandra West. The film produced by the Ramesh Asher and Sanjiv Shah. The film was released on 7 June 1985.

== Awards ==
- The film won the National Film Award for Best Non-Feature Film in 1985.
- Special Jury Award, Cinema du reel, France, 1986
- Filmfare Award for Best Documentary, 1986
