= Anand Patwardhan =

Indian film director (born 1950)

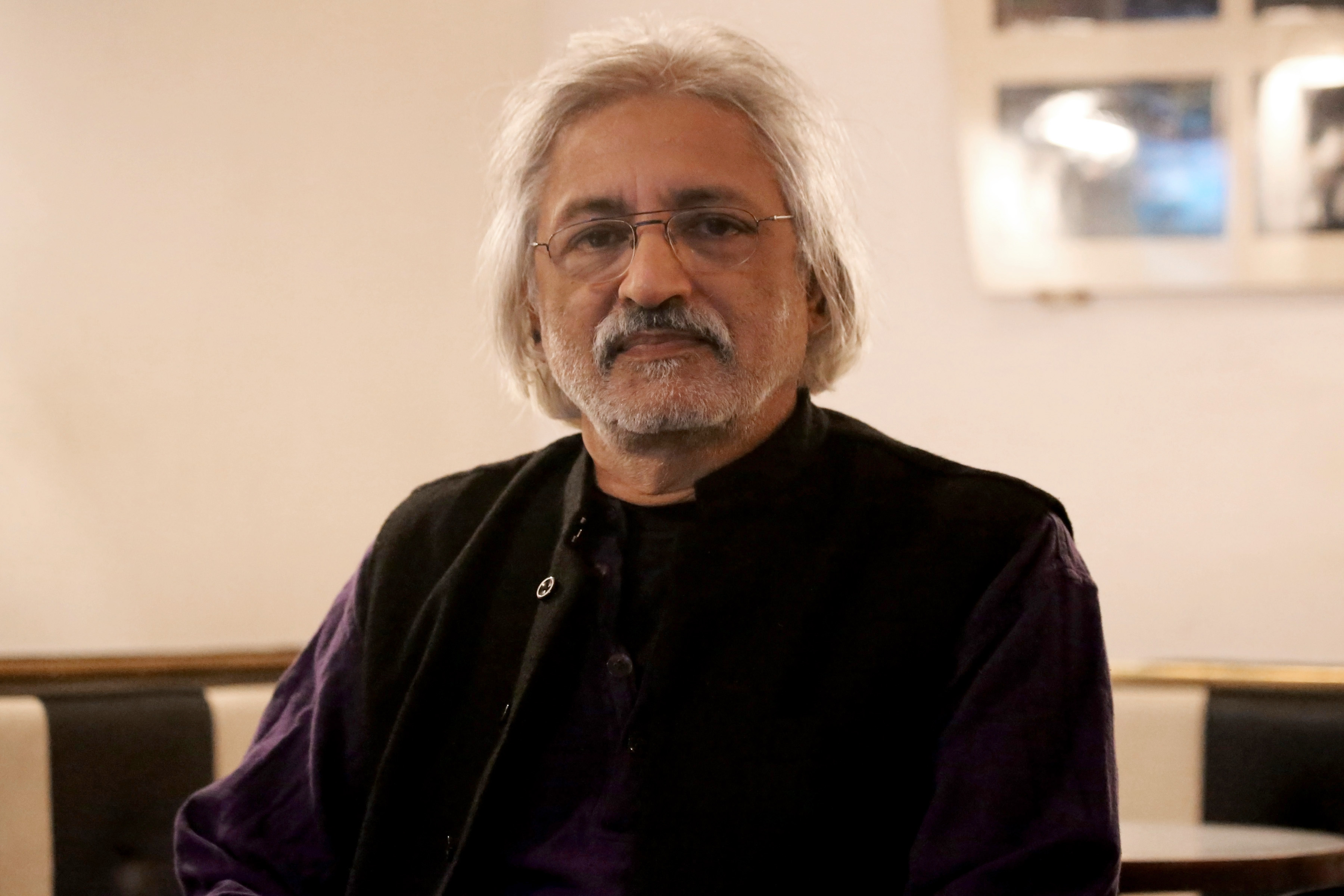
- Patwardhan in 2012
- Born: 18 February 1950 (age 76); Bombay, Bombay State, India
- Education: University of Mumbai (BA); Brandeis University (BA); McGill University (MA)
- Occupation: Filmmaker
- Website: patwardhan.com

Anand Patwardhan (/ˈɑːnənd pʌtˈwɑːrdən/; born 18 February 1950) is an Indian documentary filmmaker known for his socio-political, human rights-oriented films. Some of his films explore the rise of religious fundamentalism, sectarianism and casteism in India, while others investigate nuclear nationalism and unsustainable development. Notable films include Bombay: Our City (1985), In Memory of Friends (1990), In the Name of God (1992), Father, Son, and Holy War, A Narmada Diary (both 1995), War and Peace (2002), Jai Bhim Comrade (2011), Reason (2018) and The World is Family (2023), which have won national and international awards.

== Biography ==
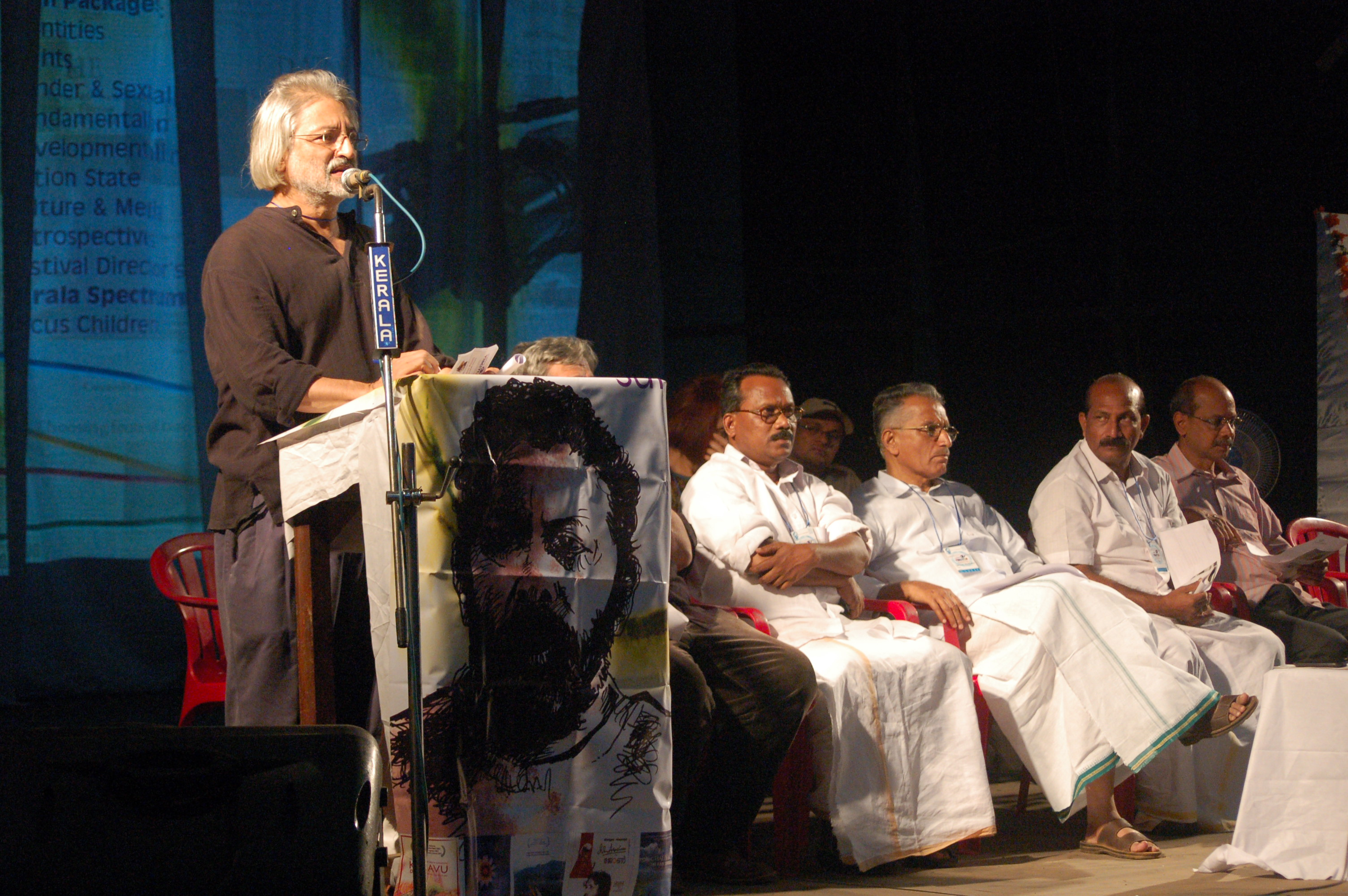
Patwardhan speaking in ViBGYOR Film Festival 2011

Patwardhan was born on 18 February 1950, in Bombay, Bombay State. He earned a Bachelor of Arts degree in English literature at Mumbai University in 1970, a Bachelor of Arts in Sociology at Brandeis University in 1972 and a Master of Arts in Communications at McGill University in 1982. He is a member of the Oscar Academy.

== Films ==
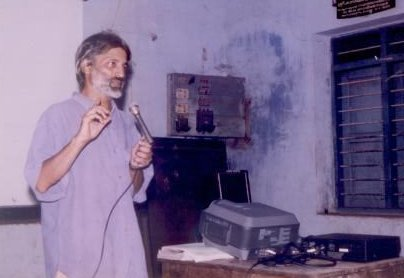
Patwardhan during a screening of Ram ke Naam at Kollam

Virtually all of Patwardhan's documentary films have faced censorship from the Indian government, eventually being cleared after legal action. His film Bombay: Our City was shown on TV after a four-year court case, while Father, Son, and Holy War (1995) was adjudged in 2004 as one of 50 most memorable international documentaries of all time by DOX, Europe's leading documentary film magazine. Father, Son, and Holy War was shown on India's National Network, Doordarshan, only in the year 2006, 11 years after its making, after a prolonged court battle that lasted 10 years and ended with the nation's Supreme Court ordering the network to telecast the film without any cuts.

The Central Board of Film Certification (CBFC), refused to certify his next film, War and Peace, released in 2002. The board demanded 21 cuts before it would be certified. Patwardhan took the government to court, leading to the film being banned for over a year. However, after a court battle, Patwardhan won the right to screen his film without a single cut. As with his previous films, Patwardhan also successfully fought to force a reluctant national broadcaster, Doordarshan, to show this film on their national network. It was commercially released in multiplexes in 2005.

His 2011 documentary, Jai Bhim Comrade, was based on a police firing incident against Dalits at Ramabai Colony in Mumbai in 1997. The film, which took 14 years to complete, is considered by many to be a watershed in Patwardhan's long career. In 2013, the Sheffield International Film Festival honoured Patwardhan with an Inspiration Award. In 2014, the Mumbai International Film Festival honoured him with the V. Shantaram Lifetime Achievement Award.

Upon being asked in a BFI interview to deliver a message for future documentary filmmakers, Patwardhan famously replied: "No message really. Do it only if it burns when you don't."

== Political views ==
As a student, Patwardhan was an activist, involved in the Anti-Vietnam War movement, United Farm Workers Union and Bihar Movement. In December 2023, alongside 50 other filmmakers, Patwardhan signed an open letter published in Libération demanding a ceasefire and an end to the killing of civilians amid the 2023 Israeli invasion of the Gaza Strip, and for a humanitarian corridor into Gaza to be established for humanitarian aid, and the release of hostages.

In June 2026, Patwardhan wrote an op-ed against the blockage by India's Central Board of Film Certification of the film The Voice of Hind Rajab (2025), a film about the killing of Hind Rajab, a five-year-old Palestinian girl, by the Israel Defense Forces. In the piece, he described Israel's actions in Gaza as a genocide, and hoped for the Indian government to distance itself from Israel.

== Filmography ==
=== Films ===
Year	Original title	English title	Ref.
1971	क्रान्ति की तरंगें	Waves of Revolution	
1978	ज़मीर के बंदि	Prisoners of Conscience	
1981	ਉਥਾਨ ਦਾ ਵੇਲਾ	A Time to Rise	
1985	हमारा शहर	Bombay: Our City	
1990	उन मित्रों की याद प्यारी	In Memory of Friends	
1992	राम के नाम	In the name of God	
1995	नर्मदा डायरी	A Narmada Diary	
1995	पितृ, पुत्र और धर्मयुद्ध	Father, Son and Holy War	
1998	Fishing: In the Sea of Greed	—N/a	
2002	जंग और अमन	War and Peace	
2012	जय भीम कॉम्रेड	Jai Bhim Comrade	
2018	विवेक	Reason	
2023	वसुधैव कुटुंबकम	The World is Family	

=== Short films ===
Year	Title	Ref.
1996	OCCUPATION: MILL WORKER	
2009	Children of Mandala	

=== Music videos ===
Year	Title	Ref.
1996	"We Are Not Your Monkeys"	
1998	"Ribbons for Peace"	
2006	“images you didn’t see”	
