= Boby John =

Indian film sound designer and mixing engineer

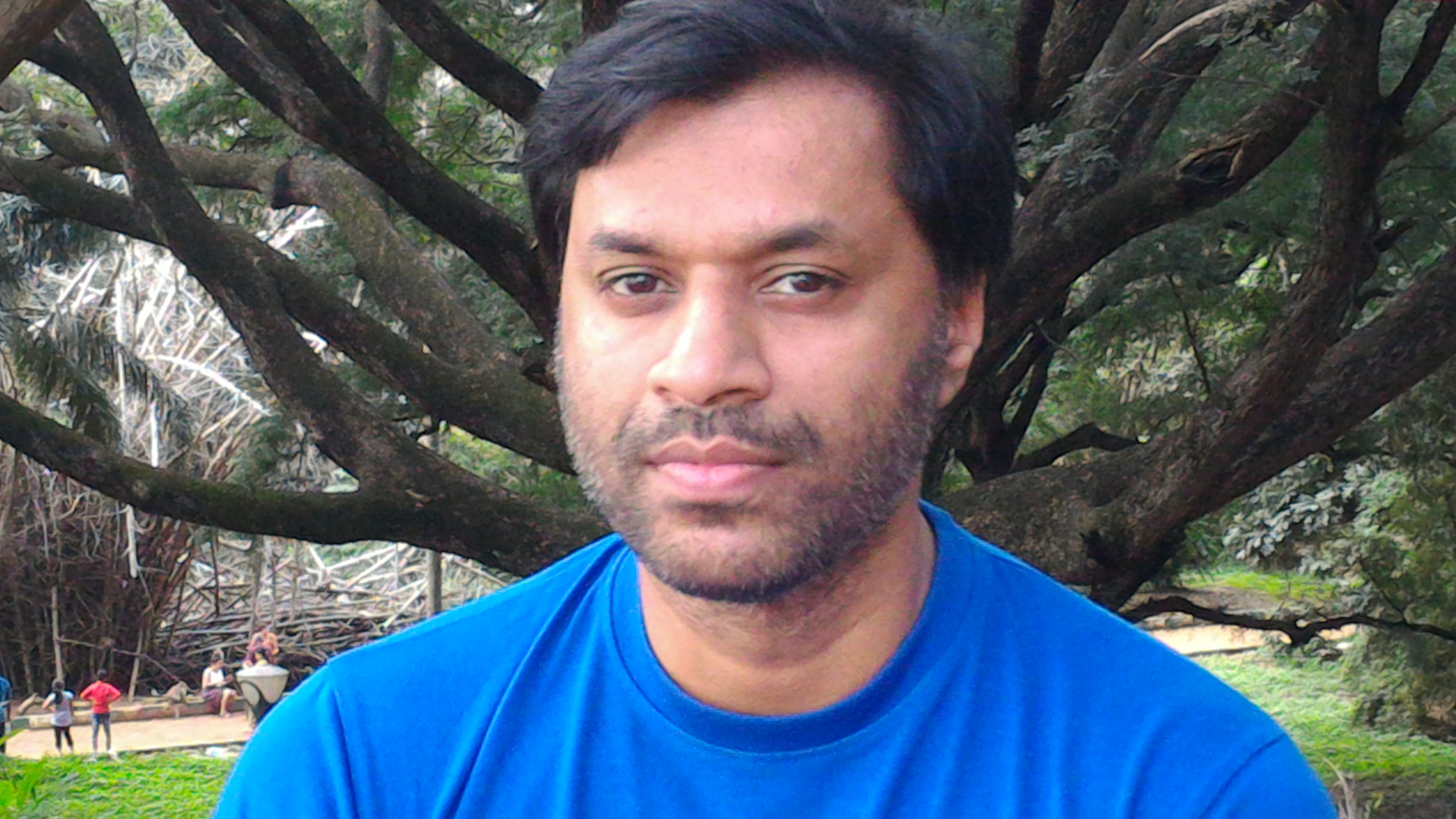
- Born: 31 August 1970 (age 56); Vazhakulam, Kerala, India
- Education: Nirmala College; FTII
- Occupation: Audio engineer
- Years active: 1995-present
- Spouse: Shailaja George
- Children: 2
- Parents: John Mathai; Annakutty

Boby John (born 31 August 1970) is an Indian film sound designer and mixing engineer. He has worked in various Hindi, Marathi, Malayalam and Assamese feature films, documentary films, short films and television advertisements. He is one of India's best sync sound editors. He owns a mixing studio, Prathibha Studio, at Mumbai.

== Early life ==
Boby John was born on 31 August 1970 in Vazhakulam, a small town near Muvattupuzha in Ernakulam district of Kerala state. He completed his schooling from Thekkummala St. Rita's LP School and Vazhakulam Infant Jesus High School. He then joined at Nirmala College, Muvattupuzha for his pre-degree course and later completed B.Sc in Physics in 1991. In 1992, he joined at the Film and Television Institute of India, Pune, for the three year postgraduate diploma course in sound recording and sound design.

== Selected filmography ==
| Year | Title | Credit | Director(s) | Language |
|---|---|---|---|---|
| 2005 | Black | Dialogue editor | Sanjay Leela Bhansali | Hindi |
| 2005 | Mangal Pandey: The Rising | Dialogue editor | Ketan Mehta | Hindi |
| 2007 | Dhamaal | Dialogue editor | Indra Kumar | Hindi |
| 2008 | All the World's a Stage (documentary) | Re-recording mixer Sound designer | Nirmal Chander | Gujrati, Hindi; English |
| 2008 | Sarkar Raj | Dialogue editor | Ram Gopal Varma | Hindi |
| 2008 | Firaaq | Sound editor | Nandita Das | Hindi |
| 2008 | Welcome to Sajjanpur | Sound editor | Shyam Benegal | Hindi |
| 2009 | Loudspeaker | Sound editor | Jayaraj | Malayalam |
| 2010 | Tere Bin Laden | Sound editor | Abhishek Sharma | Hindi |
| 2010 | Peepli Live | Sound editor | Anusha Rizvi | Hindi |
| 2010 | Veettilekkulla Vazhi | Sound editor | Dr. Biju | Malayalam |
| 2011 | Tanu Weds Manu | Dialogue editor | Aanand L. Rai | Hindi |
| 2011 | The Dirty Picture | Sound editor | Milan Luthria | Hindi |
| 2012 | Shanghai | Dialogue editor | Dibakar Banerjee | Hindi |
| 2012 | Akasathinte Niram | Sound editor | Dr. Biju | Malayalam |
| 2012 | Celluloid Man (documentary) | Dialogue editor | Shivendra Singh Dungarpur | English, Hindi; Kannada, Bengali |
| 2013 | Special 26 | Sound editor | Neeraj Pandey | Hindi |
| 2013 | Zinda Bhaag | Re-recording mixer | Meenu Gaur, Farjad Nabi | Punjabi |
| 2013 | Liar's Dice | Sound editor | Geetu Mohandas | Hindi |
| 2014 | Killa | Sound editor | Avinash Arun | Marathi |
| 2014 | Perariyathavar | Sound editor | Dr. Biju | Malayalam |
| 2014 | Daughters of Mother India (documentary) | Re-recording mixer Sound designer | Vibha Bakshi | Hindi, English |
| 2015 | Dhanak | Sound designer | Nagesh Kukunoor | Hindi |
| 2015 | Bokul | Re-recording mixer Sound designer | Reema Borah | Assamese |
| 2015 | The Immortals (documentary) | Re-recording mixer | Shivendra Singh Dungarpur | Hindi, Tamil; Bengali, English |
| 2016 | Krantidhara | Re-recording mixer | Himanshu Khatua | Odia |
| 2016 | Ki & Ka | Sound editor | R. Balki | Hindi |
| 2016 | Laal Rang | Re-recording mixer | Syed Ahmad Afzal | Hindi |
| 2016 | Kaadu Pookkunna Neram | Sound editor | Dr. Biju | Malayalam |
| 2016 | Force 2 | Sound designer | Abhinay Deo | Hindi |
| 2016 | Gurgaon | Sound editor | Shanker Raman | Hindi, Haryanvi |
| 2016 | Zikr Us Parivash Ka (documentary) | Re-recording mixer Sound designer | Nirmal Chander | Hindi, Urdu, Bengali, English |
| 2017 | Raees | Effects editor (action scenes) | Rahul Dholakia | Hindi |
| 2017 | Phillauri | Sound editor | Anshai Lal | Hindi |
| 2017 | Thondimuthalum Driksakshiyum | Dialogue editor | Dileesh Pothan | Malayalam |
| 2017 | Secret Superstar | Dialogue editor | Advait Chandan | Hindi |
| 2017 | Mayaanadhi | Dialogue editor | Aashiq Abu | Malayalam |
| 2018 | Carbon | Dialogue editor | Venu | Malayalam |
| 2018 | Hey Jude | Sound editor | Shyamaprasad | Malayalam |
| 2018 | Raid | Sound editor | Raj Kumar Gupta | Hindi |
| 2018 | Raazi | Dialogue editor | Meghna Gulzar | Hindi |
| 2018 | CzechMate: In Search of Jiří Menzel (documentary) | Re-recording mixer | Shivendra Singh Dungarpur | Czech, English; Slovak, Hungarian; Polish, French |
| 2018 | Njan Prakashan | Dialogue editor | Sathyan Anthikkad | Malayalam |
| 2019 | Kumbalangi Nights | Dialogue editor | Madhu C. Narayanan | Malayalam |
| 2019 | Son Rise (documentary) | Re-recording mixer Sound designer | Vibha Bakshi | Hindi, English |
| 2019 | Virus | Dialogue editor | Aashiq Abu | Malayalam |
| 2019 | Section 375 | Dialogue editor | Ajay Bahl | Hindi |
| 2019 | Bard of Blood (web television) | Re-recording mixer | Ribhu Dasgupta | Hindi |
| 2019 | Ganagandharvan | Dialogue editor | Ramesh Pisharody | Malayalam |
| 2019 | Android Kunjappan Version 5.25 | Dialogue editor | Ratheesh Balakrishnan Poduval | Malayalam |
| 2020 | Sab Kushal Mangal | Dialogue editor | Karan Vishwanath Kashyap | Hindi |
| 2020 | Jamtara – Sabka Number Ayega (web television) | Re-recording mixer | Soumendra Padhi | Hindi |
| 2020 | Dil Bechara | Sound editor | Mukesh Chhabra | Hindi |
| 2020 | Khuda Haafiz | Dialogue editor | Faruk Kabir | Hindi |
| 2021 | Tribhanga | Re-recording mixer | Renuka Shahane | Hindi |
| 2021 | The Girl on the Train | Re-recording mixer | Ribhu Dasgupta | Hindi |
| 2021 | Nayattu | Dialogue editor | Martin Prakkat | Malayalam |
| 2022 | Guilty Minds (web television) | Re-recording mixer | Shefali Bhusan | Hindi |
| 2022 | Modern Love Hyderabad (web television) | Re-recording mixer | Nagesh Kukunoor; Venkatesh Maha | Telugu |
| 2023 | Thuramukham | Dialogue editor | Rajeev Ravi | Malayalam |
| 2023 | Bholaa | Dialogue editor | Ajay Devgan | Hindi |
| 2023 | School of Lies (web television) | Re-recording mixer | Avinash Arun | Hindi |
| 2023 | The Jengaburu Curse (web television) | Re-recording mixer Sound designer | Nila Madhab Panda | Hindi |

== Awards ==
| Year | Award | Category | Film/Documentary | Ref. |
|---|---|---|---|---|
| 2008 | Indian Documentary Producers' Association (IDPA) Awards | Best Sound Design (Non-fictional) | All the World's a Stage | |
| 2020 | Indian Recording Arts Academy (IRAA) Awards | Best Dialogue editor/ADR engineer (Film - Regional) | Kumbalangi Nights | |
