= P. K. Nair =

- Born: Paramesh Krishnan Nair; April 6, 1933; Thiruvananthapuram, Kerala
- Died: 4 March 2016 (aged 82); Pune, Maharashtra
- Other name: Celluloid Man
- Occupations: Film archivist, film scholar, film teacher, film festival consultant

Paramesh Krishnan Nair (6 April 1933 – 4 March 2016) was an Indian film archivist and film scholar, who was the founder and director of the National Film Archive of India (NFAI) in 1964. He is regarded as the Henri Langlois of India because of his lifelong dedication towards the preservation of films in India. A passionate film archivist, he worked at the NFAI for over three decades, collecting films from India and from all over the world.

He was instrumental in acquiring for the archive several landmark Indian films like Dadasaheb Phalke's Raja Harishchandra and Kaliya Mardan, Bombay Talkies films such as Jeevan Naiya, Bandhan, Kangan, Achhut Kanya and Kismet, S. S. Vasan's Chandralekha and Uday Shankar's Kalpana.

In 2012, Celluloid Man, an award-winning documentary was made on his life and works, by Shivendra Singh Dungarpur.

== Early life and education ==
Born and brought up in Thiruvananthapuram, Kerala, Nair developed an interest in cinema early in his life. His initiation into films began with Tamil mythological films in the early 1940s such as K. Subramaniam's Ananthasayanam and Bhakta Prahlada. His fascination for cinema began here, though his family did not support his interest in films.

He graduated in science from the University of Kerala in 1953. Soon afterwards, he went to Bombay to pursue a career in filmmaking.

== Film and Television Institute of India ==
Though he got some practical training in filmmaking from filmmakers of Bombay, particularly Mehboob Khan, Bimal Roy and Hrishikesh Mukherjee, he realised that he did not have the ideal qualities to become a filmmaker himself. His interest lay more in the field of academics.

As advised by Jean Bhownagary of Films Division of India, he appeared for an interview at the Film and Television Institute of India (FTII), was selected and joined the institute in March 1961 as a research assistant. While at FTII, he assisted Marie Seton and Professor Satish Bahadur in initiating and conducting the film appreciation classes of FTII. He also conducted early work to establish the film archive set up as a separate wing of FTII. He corresponded with the curators and directors of established film archives in the United Kingdom, United States, France, Italy, Poland, Soviet Union and other countries. All of them advised an independent autonomous entity for NFAI and not as a wing of FTII.

== National Film Archive of India ==
The National Film Archive of India was founded in 1964 and Nair was appointed to the post of assistant curator in November 1965. He established the archive from scratch by collecting films from all over India and the world and was promoted as director of the archive in 1982. He spearheaded the NFAI, Pune for nearly three decades and built up the archive which now enjoys a vibrant international reputation.

Landmark acquisitions include the Dadasaheb Phalke films and films of New Theatres, Bombay Talkies, Minerva Movietone, Wadia Movietone, Gemini Studios and AVM Productions.

He was instrumental in introducing the works of world masters of cinema like Ingmar Bergman, Akira Kurosawa, Andrzej Wajda, Miklós Jancsó, Krzysztof Zanussi, Vittorio De Sica, Federico Fellini, apart from significant Indian film makers like Satyajit Ray, Ritwik Ghatak, Mrinal Sen, V. Shantaram, Raj Kapoor and Guru Dutt to FTII students, film society members, and other film study groups in the country. He was also instrumental in setting up the International Film Festival of Kerala.

When he retired in April 1991, he had collected over 12,000 films, of which 8,000 were Indian.

== Post-retirement ==
After his retirement, he lived in Pune not very far away from the NFAI and the Film and Television Institute of India. After a prolonged illness he died on March 4, 2016, at Sahyadri Nursing Home in Pune. He is survived by a daughter who lives in Thiruvananthapuram and two sons who live in Pune and Canada.

== Awards and recognition ==
Nair was awarded the Satyajit Ray Memorial Award in 2008. Shivendra Singh Dungarpur, a film archivist who considered Nair his "guru", produced Celluloid Man, a documentary chronicling the life of Nair. The documentary premiered at the Il Cinema Ritrovato in Bologna, Italy in June 2012. Later it won two National Awards at the 60th National Film Awards, including Best Biographical Film and Best Editing. The film was released in India on 3 May 2013 to coincide with the centenary of Indian cinema.
