= National Film Award for Best Historical Reconstruction/Compilation Film =

Indian film award

- National award for contributions to short film
- Sponsored by: Directorate of Film Festivals
- Rewards: Rajat Kamal (Silver Lotus); ₹50,000
- First award: 1984
- Final award: 2017
- Most recent winner: • Naachi se Baanchi; • Sword of Liberty

Highlights
- Total awarded: 24
- First winner: Nehru

The National Film Award for Best Historical Reconstruction/Compilation Film was one of the National Film Awards presented annually by the Directorate of Film Festivals, the organisation set up by Ministry of Information and Broadcasting, India. It was one of several awards presented for non-feature films.

The award was instituted in 1984, at 32nd National Film Awards and awarded annually for non-feature films produced in the year across the country, in all Indian languages. At the 69th National Film Awards, the award is clubbed with National Film Award for Best Biographical Film, with the new category named as Best Biographical / Historical Reconstruction / Compilation Film.

== Awards ==
Awards legends
Indicates a joint award for the year

Award includes 'Rajat Kamal' (Silver Lotus Award) and cash prize. Following are the award winners over the years:

List of films, showing the year, language(s), producer(s) and director(s)
Year	Film(s)	Language(s)	Producer(s)	Director(s)	Refs.
1984 (32nd)	Nehru	English	Yash Chowdhary	• Shyam Benegal • Yuri Aldokhin	
1985 (33rd)	No Award				
1986 (34th)	We The People of India	English	N. S. Thapa for Films Division	Bhanumurthy Alur	
1987 (35th)	The Story of Delhi	English	Serbjeet International for Films Division	Serbjeet Singh	
1988 (36th)	No Award				
1989 (37th)	Chhapakhanar Bangla Haraf	Bengali	• Shreemati Chatterjee • Chandrika Bhattacharjee	Abhijit Chattopadhyay	
1989 (37th)	Kathni Karni Eksi (Jamnalal Bajaj)	Hindi	M/s Climb Films	Bhim Sain	
1990 (38th)	No Award				
1991 (39th)	Anand Bhavan	English	Yash Chaudhary	V. B. Chandra	
1992 (40th)	No Award				
1993 (41st)	No Award				
1994 (42nd)	Phalke Children	English	• R. Krishna Mohan • Y. N. Engineer	Kamal Swaroop	
1995 (43rd)	Bhalji Pendharkar	English	• C. S. Nair • B. R. Shendge for Films Division	P. B. Pendharkar for Films Division	
1996 (44th)	No Award				
1997 (45th)	Ayyankili: Adhastitharude Vimochakan	Malayalam	• P. Sasidharan • A. Krishna	R. S. Madhu	
1998 (46th)	Anna Vaazhigirar	Tamil	Tamil Nadu Films Division	Tamil Nadu Films Division	
1999 (47th)	No Award				
2000 (48th)	From the land of Buddhism to the Land of Buddha	English	Kuldip Sinha for Films Division	Shalini Shah for Films Division	
2001 (49th)	No Award				
2002 (50th)	No Award				
2003 (51st)	Vaidyaratnam P. S. Varrier	English	Kerala State Film Development Corporation	T. Krishnan Unni	
2004 (52nd)	No Award				
2005 (53rd)	Hans Akela: Kumar Gandharva†	Hindi	Films Division	Jabbar Patel	
2006 (54th)	No Award				
2007 (55th)	Antardhwani†	Hindi	Films Division	Jabbar Patel	
2008 (56th)	The Assassination of Rajiv Gandhi: A Reconstruction	English	Films Division	R. Krishna Mohan	
2009 (57th)	Pancham Unmixed	• Bengali • Hindi • English	Brahmanand S. Siingh	Brahmanand S. Siingh	
2010 (58th)	No Award				
2011 (59th)	Vishnupant Damle: Bolpatancha Mook Nayak†	Marathi	Anil Anant Damle	Virendra Valsangkar	
2012 (60th)	Celluloid Man†	• English • Hindi • Kannada • Bengali	Shivendra Singh Dungarpur	Shivendra Singh Dungarpur	
2013 (61st)	The Last Adieu†	English	Films Division	Shabnam Sukhdev	
2014 (62nd)	Amar Katha: Story of Binodini†	Bengali	Films Division	Tuhinabha Majumder	
2015 (63rd)	Life in Metaphors: A Portrait of Girish Kasaravalli†	• English • Kannada	Reelism Film	O.P. Shrivastava	
2016 (64th)	Zikr Us Parivaksha: Begum Akhtar†	English	Sangeet Natak Akademi	Nirmal Chander	
2017 (65th)	Naachi se Baanchi†		Films Division of India	Biju Toppo	
2017 (65th)	Sword of Liberty†		R. C. Suresh	Shiny Jacob Benjamin	
2018 (66th)	No Award				
2019 (67th)	No Award				
2020 (68th)	No Award				
