= 18th Kolkata International Film Festival =

Film festival in India

18th Kolkata Film Festival
- Opening film: A Separation
- Location: Kolkata, West Bengal, India
- Founded: 1995
- No. of films: 8 days . 60 countries. 140 directors. 180 films.
- Festival date: 10 November 2012– 17 November 2012
- Website: kff.in

The 18th Annual Kolkata Film Festival was held 10 to 17 November 2012. The Kolkata Film Festival (KFF) is an annual film festival held in Kolkata, India. Founded in 1995, it is the second oldest international film festival in India. The festival is organized by the West Bengal Film Centre under the West Bengal Government. Actors and filmmakers including Amitabh Bachchan, Shah Rukh Khan, Mithun Chakraborty, Dev Adhikari, Katrina Kaif, Anushka Sharma, Chief Minister Smt. and Mamata Banerjee inaugurated the festival at Netaji Indoor Stadium on 10 November 2012.

== Categories ==
- Centenary Tribute - Michelangelo Antonioni
- 200 Years Birth Anniversary : Charles Dickens
- Homage
- Retrospective - Michael Cacoyannis
- New Horizon
- Focus : Africa (Now & Then)
- 100 Years of Indian Cinema
- Where is the land
- Cinema International
- Big Story (Amitabh Bachchan)
- Asian Select (NETPAC Award)
- Indian Select
- Children Screening
- Students Shorts
- Calcutta/Kolkata
- Tribute
- Special Tribute : PK Nair
