= Ranjan Palit =

Indian cinematographer, documentary filmmaker

- Education: FTII
- Occupations: cinematographer documentary filmmaker
- Years active: 1982–present
- Spouse: Vasudha Palit (wife)

Ranjan Palit is an Indian cinematographer, documentary filmmaker, and director known for his work spanning nearly four decades.

== Career ==
Ranjan has received multiple national awards, including two for best cinematography, as well as awards for best film on social issues and best narration.

He is a two-time winner (1990, 1996) of the Golden Conch Award for best documentary film at the Mumbai International Film Festival (MIFF), in addition to several international awards.

In 2021, he received a lifetime achievement award for documentary filmmaking at the International Documentary and Short Film Festival of Kerala (IDSFFK).

Ranjan conducts classes on cinematography and documentary filmmaking, including at the Film and Television Institute of India (FTII) and the Satyajit Ray Film & Television Institute (SRFTI).

He has shot more than 100 documentaries and 20 feature films, in addition to numerous advertisements.

He earned his diploma in cinematography from FTII in 1982.

== Personal ==
Ranjan's wife Vasudha Palit is a documentary filmmaker.

== Filmography ==
As cinematographer – documentaries

- Such a Morning (1985) – additional cinematography
- Hamara Shahar - Bombay, Our City (1985)
- Babulal Bhuiya Ki Qurbani (1987)
- When Hamlet Went to Mizoram (1990)
- Egaro Mile (1991)
- Kamlabai (1992)
- The Boy in the Branch (1993)
- Tales from the Planet Kolkota (1993)
- Et cetera (1997)
- For Maya (1997)
- Skin Deep (1998)
- Karvaan (1999)
- In the Forest Hangs a Bridge (1999)
- Mukundo (2000)
- Almoriana (2000)
- Performing Death (2001)
- A Night of Prophecy (2002)
- The Men in the Tree (2002)
- Life of Buddha (2003)
- Journeyings and Conversations - Kaya Poochhe Maya Se (2004)
- Moustaches Unlimited (2005)
- Flying in a Blue Dream (2006)
- The Lightning Testimonies (2007)
- Hope Dies Last in War (2007)
- Jashn-e-Kashmir (2007)
- To Catch the Wind (2008)
- Indian Hill Railways (2010)
- The Identities (2012)
- Celluloid Man (2012)
- Textures of Loss (2012)
- The Revolutionary Optimists (2013)
- Ek Inquilab Aur Aaya: Lucknow 1920-1949 (2017)
- Red Ribbon (2017)
- Mirzaa (2017)
- CzechMate: In Search of Jiri Menzel (2018)
- XO (2023)
- 251 (2023)
- The Lotus and the Swan (2023)

As cinematographer - TV series

- Nakaab (2021)
- Freedom (2023)

As cinematographer - feature films

- Way Back Home (2003)
- In Othello (2003)
- Byatikrami (2003)
- Dreaming Lhasa (2005)
- Karma (2006)
- 7 Khoon Maaf (2011)
- Aparajita Tumi (2012)
- Shyamal Uncle Turns off the Lights (2012)
- Pataakha (2018)
- 22 Yards (2018)
- Purbo Poschim Dokkin (2019)
- Ghost Stories (2020)
- Tangra Blues (2021)
- Nine Hills One Valley (2022)
- Bhuban Babur Smartphone (2022)
- Zwigato (2022)
- Tees (2024)

As director – documentaries

- Bhiwandi – FTII student diploma film
- Voices from Baliapal (1988) – co-directed with Vasudha Joshi
- Follow the Rainbow (1991) – co-directed with Vasudha Joshi
- A Magic Mystic Marketplace - Abak Jaye Here (1996)
- Forever Young (2008)
- In Camera – Diaries of a Documentary Cameraman (2010)
- D'Cruz and Me (2018)

As director - feature films

- Lord of the Orphans (2020)
- A Knock on the Door (2023)
