= 60th National Film Awards =

Indian ceremony celebrating cinema of 2012

- 60th National Film Awards
- Awarded for: Best of Indian cinema in 2012
- Awarded by: Directorate of Film Festivals
- Presented by: Pranab Mukherjee (President of India)
- Announced on: 18 March 2013
- Presented on: 3 May 2013
- Hosted by: R. Madhavan; Huma Qureshi
- Official website: dff.nic.in

Highlights
- Best Feature Film: Paan Singh Tomar
- Best Non-Feature Film: Shepherds of Paradise
- Best Book: Silent Cinema in India-A Pictorial Journey
- Best Film Critic: P. S. Radhakrishnan
- Dadasaheb Phalke Award: Pran
- Most awards: Dekh Indian Circus (4)

The 60th National Film Awards ceremony was an event during which the Directorate of Film Festivals presented its annual National Film Awards to honour the best films of 2012 in Indian cinema. The ceremony was held on 3 May 2013 and was hosted by actors R. Madhavan and Huma Qureshi.

== Selection process ==
The Directorate of Film Festivals invited nominations for the awards on 3 January 2013. Feature and Non-Feature Films certified by the Central Board of Film Certification (CBFC) between 1 January 2012, and 31 December 2012, were eligible for the film award categories. Books, critical studies, reviews or articles on cinema published in Indian newspapers, magazines, and journals between 1 January 2012, and 31 December 2012, were eligible for the best writing on cinema section. Entries of dubbed, revised or copied versions of a film or translation, abridgements, edited or annotated works and reprints were ineligible for the awards. The deadline for submissions was 21 January 2013.

For the Feature and Non-Feature Films sections, films in any Indian language, shot on 16 mm, 35 mm, a wider film gauge or a digital format, and released in cinemas, on video or digital formats for home viewing were eligible. Films were required to be certified as a feature film, a featurette or a Documentary/Newsreel/Non-Fiction by the CBFC.

== Dadasaheb Phalke Award ==
Introduced in 1969, the Dadasaheb Phalke Award is the highest award given to recognise the contributions of film personalities towards the development of Indian cinema and for distinguished contributions to the medium, its growth and promotion. A committee consisting of five personalities from the Indian film industry was appointed to evaluate the Dadasaheb Phalke award nominations for 2012. Following were the jury members:

• Balu Mahendra (Cinematographer, filmmaker and screen writer)
• Ramesh Sippy (Filmmaker)
• Saira Banu (Screenwriter and director)

For the year 2012, the award was announced on 12 April 2013 to be presented to Pran, a veteran actor of Bollywood known for portraying various negative roles. He was also a Padma Bhushan recipient in 2001.

Name of Award	Image	Awardee(s)	Awarded As	Awards
Dadasaheb Phalke Award		Pran	Actor	Swarna Kamal, ₹1 million (US$10,000) and a Shawl

== Feature films ==
The Hindi film Dekh Indian Circus won the maximum number of awards (4) followed by the Malayalam film Ustad Hotel, Hindi films Kahaani, Chittagong, Vicky Donor; and the Marathi film Dhag (3 awards each)

=== Jury ===
For the Feature Film section, six committees were formed based on the different geographic regions in India. The two-tier evaluation process included a central committee and five regional committees. The central committee, headed by Basu Chatterjee, included the heads of each regional committee and five other jury members. At regional level, each committee consisted of one chief and four members. The chief and one non-chief member of each regional committee were selected from outside that geographic region. The table below names the jury members for the central and regional committees:

Central Jury

• Basu Chatterjee (Chairperson)
• Suresh Jindal	• Sadhu Meher
• Mohan Sharma	• Jayaraj
• K. N. T. Sastry	• Chitra Mudgal
• C. V. Shivashankar	• Moloya Goswami
• Aadesh Shrivastava	• Sudeshna Roy

Northern Region: (Bhojpuri, Dogri, English, Hindi, Punjabi, Rajasthani, Urdu)

• Mohan Sharma (Chair)
• Suhasini Mulay	• Raja Sen
• Satish Kumar	• Amitabh Parashar

Eastern Region: (Assamese, Bengali, Oriya and North-Eastern dialects)

• K. N. T. Sastry (Chair)
• Mani Ram	• Hemen Das
• Somnath Gupta	• Ervell Menezes

Western Region: (Gujarati, Konkani, Marathi)

• Jayaraj (Chair)
• Aditi Deshpande	• Tarali Sarma
• Anil Damle	• Bipin Nadkarni

Southern Region I: (Malayalam, Tamil)

• Sadhu Meher (Chair)
• Sabu Cherian	• D. P. Mukherjee
• Baradwaj Rangan	• Dr. Biju

Southern Region II: (Kannada, Telugu)

• Suresh Jindal (Chair)
• Nagathihalli Chandrashekhar
• S. K. Srivastava
• Narasimha Nandi

=== All India Awards ===
==== Golden Lotus Award ====
All the winners are awarded with the Swarna Kamal (Golden Lotus Award), a certificate and a cash prize.

Name of Award	Name of Film(s)	Language	Awardee(s)	Cash prize
Best Feature Film	Paan Singh Tomar	Hindi	Producer: UTV Software Communications; Director: Tigmanshu Dhulia	₹250,000 (US$2,600)
Best Debut Film of a Director	Chittagong	Hindi	Producer: Bedabrata Pain; Director: Bedabrata Pain	₹125,000 (US$1,300)
Best Debut Film of a Director	101 Chodyangal	Malayalam	Producer: Thomas Kottakkakam; Director: Sidhartha Siva	₹125,000 (US$1,300)
Best Popular Film Providing Wholesome Entertainment	Vicky Donor	Hindi	Producer: Sunil Lulla, John Abraham, Ronnie Lahiri and Ram Mirchandani; Director: Shoojit Sircar	₹200,000 (US$2,100)
Best Popular Film Providing Wholesome Entertainment	Ustad Hotel	Malayalam	Producer: Listin Stephen; Director: Anwar Rasheed	₹200,000 (US$2,100)
Best Children's Film	Dekh Indian Circus	Hindi	Producer: Mahaveer Jain; Director: Mangesh Hadawale	₹150,000 (US$1,600)
Best Direction	Dhag	Marathi	Shivaji Lotan Patil	₹250,000 (US$2,600)
Best Animated Film	Delhi Safari	Hindi	Producer: Anupama Patil and Kishor Patil; Director: Nikhil Advani; Animator: Rafique Shaikh	₹100,000 (US$1,000)

==== Silver Lotus Award ====
All the winners were awarded with a Rajat Kamal (Silver Lotus Award), a certificate and a cash prize.

Name of Award	Name of Film(s)	Language(s)	Awardee(s)	Cash prize
Best Feature Film on National Integration	Thanichalla Njan	Malayalam	Producer: Cherian Philip; Director: Babu Thiruvalla	₹150,000 (US$1,600)
Best Film on Social Issues	Spirit	Malayalam	Producer: Antony Perumbavoor; Director: Ranjith	₹150,000 (US$1,600)
Best Film on Environment Conservation/Preservation	Black Forest	Malayalam	Producer: Baby Mathew Somatheeram; Director: Joshy Mathew	₹150,000 (US$1,600)
Best Actor	Paan Singh Tomar	Hindi	Irrfan Khan	₹50,000 (US$520)
Best Actor	Anumati	Marathi	Vikram Gokhale	₹50,000 (US$520)
Best Actress	Dhag	Marathi	Usha Jadhav	₹50,000 (US$520)
Best Supporting Actor	Vicky Donor	Hindi	Annu Kapoor	₹50,000 (US$520)
Best Supporting Actress	Vicky Donor	Hindi	Dolly Ahluwalia	₹50,000 (US$520)
Best Supporting Actress	Thanichalla Njan	Malayalam	Kalpana	₹50,000 (US$520)
Best Child Artist	Dekh Indian Circus	Hindi	Virendrasingh Rathore	₹50,000 (US$520)
Best Child Artist	101 Chodyangal	Malayalam	Minon	₹50,000 (US$520)
Best Male Playback Singer	Chittagong ("Bolo Na")	Hindi	Shankar Mahadevan	₹50,000 (US$520)
Best Female Playback Singer	Samhita ("Palakein Naa Moondon")	Marathi	Arati Ankalikar-Tikekar	₹50,000 (US$520)
Best Cinematography	Ko:Yad	Mishing	Cameraman: Sudheer Palsane; Laboratory Processing: Prasad Studios	₹50,000 (US$520)
Best Screenplay • Screenplay Writer (Original)	Kahaani	Hindi	Sujoy Ghosh	₹50,000 (US$520)
Best Screenplay • Screenplay Writer (Adapted)	OMG – Oh My God	Hindi	• Bhavesh Mandalia • Umesh Shukla	₹50,000 (US$520)
Best Screenplay • Dialogues	Ustad Hotel	Malayalam	Anjali Menon	₹50,000 (US$520)
Best Audiography • Location Sound Recordist	Annayum Rasoolum	Malayalam	Radhakrishnan S.	₹50,000 (US$520)
Best Audiography • Sound Designer	Shabdo	Bengali	• Anirban Sengupta • Dipankar Chaki	₹50,000 (US$520)
Best Audiography • Re-recordist of the Final Mixed Track	• Gangs of Wasseypur – Part 1 • Gangs of Wasseypur – Part 2	Hindi	• Alok De • Sinoy Joseph • Sreejesh Nair	₹50,000 (US$520)
Best Editing	Kahaani	Hindi	Namrata Rao	₹50,000 (US$520)
Best Art Direction	Vishwaroopam	Tamil	• Boontawee 'Thor' Taweepasas • Lalgudi N. Ilayaraja	₹50,000 (US$520)
Best Costume Design	Paradesi	Tamil	Poornima Ramaswamy	₹50,000 (US$520)
Best Make-up Artist	Vazhakku Enn 18/9	Tamil	Raja	₹50,000 (US$520)
Best Music Direction • Songs	Samhita	Marathi	Shailendra Barve	₹50,000 (US$520)
Best Music Direction • Background Score	Kaliyachan	Malayalam	Bijibal	₹50,000 (US$520)
Best Lyrics	Chittagong ("Bolo Na")	Hindi	Prasoon Joshi	₹50,000 (US$520)
Best Special Effects	Eega	Telugu	Makuta VFX	₹50,000 (US$520)
Best Choreography	Vishwaroopam ("Unnai Kaanadhu Naan")	Tamil	Birju Maharaj	₹50,000 (US$520)
Special Jury Award	Chitrangada	Bengali	Rituparno Ghosh (Director, Actor)	₹200,000 (US$2,100)
Special Jury Award	• Dekh Indian Circus • Gangs of Wasseypur – Part 2 • Kahaani • Talaash	Hindi	Nawazuddin Siddiqui (Actor)	₹200,000 (US$2,100)
Special Mention	Ozhimuri	Malayalam	Lal (Actor)	Certificate only
Special Mention	Bharath Stores	Kannada	H. G. Dattatreya (Actor)	Certificate only
Special Mention	Baandhon	Assamese	Bishnu Kharghoria (Actor)	Certificate only
Special Mention	Ishaqzaade	Hindi	Parineeti Chopra (Actress)	Certificate only
Special Mention	Dekh Indian Circus	Hindi	Tannishtha Chatterjee (Actress)	Certificate only
Special Mention	Dhag	Marathi	Hansraj Jagtap (Child actor)	Certificate only
Special Mention	Ustad Hotel	Malayalam	Thilakan (Actor) (Posthumously)	Certificate only

=== Regional Awards ===
National Film Awards are also given to the best films in the regional languages of India. Awards for the regional languages are categorised as per their mention in the Eighth schedule of the Constitution of India. Awardees included producers and directors of the film. No films in languages other than those specified in the Schedule VIII of the Constitution were eligible.

Name of Award	Name of Film	Awardee(s)		Cash prize
Name of Award	Name of Film	Producer(s)	Director	Cash prize
Best Feature Film in Assamese	Baandhon	Assam State Film (Finance and Development) Corporation Ltd.	Jahnu Baruah	₹100,000 (US$1,000) each
Best Feature Film in Bengali	Shabdo	Brand Value	Kaushik Ganguly	₹100,000 (US$1,000) each
Best Feature Film in Gujarati	The Good Road	NFDC	Gyan Corea	₹100,000 (US$1,000) each
Best Feature Film in Hindi	Filmistaan	Satellite Picture Pvt. Ltd.	Nitin Kakkar	₹100,000 (US$1,000) each
Best Feature Film in Kannada	Bharath Stores	Basant Productions	P. Sheshadri	₹100,000 (US$1,000) each
Best Feature Film in Malayalam	Celluloid	• Kamal • Ubaid	Kamal	₹100,000 (US$1,000) each
Best Feature Film in Manipuri	Leipaklei	Aribam Syam Sharma	Aribam Syam Sharma	₹100,000 (US$1,000) each
Best Feature Film in Marathi	Investment	Pratibha Matkari	Ratnakar Matkari	₹100,000 (US$1,000) each
Best Feature Film in Punjabi	Nabar	• Jasbir Singh • Sonu Kaur	Rajeev Sharma	₹100,000 (US$1,000) each
Best Feature Film in Tamil	Vazhakku Enn 18/9	N. Subhash Chandra Bose	Balaji Sakthivel	₹100,000 (US$1,000) each
Best Feature Film in Telugu	Eega	K. Ranganatha Sai	S. S. Rajamouli	₹100,000 (US$1,000) each
Best Feature Film in Urdu	Harud	• Aamir Bashir • Shankar Raman	Aamir Bashir	₹100,000 (US$1,000) each

Best Feature Film in Each of the Language Other Than Those Specified In the Schedule VIII of the Constitution

Name of Award	Name of Film	Awardee(s)		Cash prize
Name of Award	Name of Film	Producer	Director	Cash prize
Best Feature Film in English	Lessons in Forgetting	Prince Thampi	Unni Vijayan	₹100,000 (US$1,000) each
Best Feature Film in Mising	Ko:Yad	Manju Borah	Manju Borah	₹100,000 (US$1,000) each

== Non-Feature Films ==
=== Jury ===
A committee of seven, headed by chair, Aruna Raje Patil was appointed to evaluate the Non-Feature Films entries. The jury members were:

• Aruna Raje Patil (Chairperson)
• Sameera Jain	• Rajendra Jangley
• Meghnath	• K. R. Manoj
• Paushali Ganguli	• Tiainla Jamer

=== Golden Lotus Award ===
All the winners were awarded with the Swarna Kamal (Golden Lotus Award), a certificate and cash prize.

Name of Award	Name of Film(s)	Language(s)	Awardee(s)	Cash prize
Best Non-Feature Film	Shepherds of Paradise	• Gujari • Urdu	Producer and Director: Raja Shabir Khan	₹150,000 (US$1,600)
Best Non-Feature Film Direction	Kaatal	Marathi	Vikrant Pawar	₹150,000 (US$1,600)

=== Silver Lotus Award ===
All the winners were awarded with Rajat Kamal (Silver Lotus Award) and cash prize.

Name of Award	Name of Film(s)	Language(s)	Awardee(s)	Cash prize
Best First Non-Feature Film	Eka Gachha Eka Manisa Eka Samudra	Oriya	Producer: Veenu Bhushan Vaid; Director: Lipika Singh Darai	₹75,000 (US$780) each
Best Anthropological / Ethnographic Film	Char... The No-Man's Island	Bengali	Producer: Sourav Sarangi; Director: Sourav Sarangi	₹50,000 (US$520) each
Best Biographical Film /Best Historical Reconstruction Film	Celluloid Man	English, Hindi, Kannada and Bengali	Producer: Shivendra Singh Dungarpur; Director: Shivendra Singh Dungarpur	₹50,000 (US$520) each
Best Arts / Cultural Film	Modikhanyachya Don Goshti	Marathi	Producer: Gouri Patwardhan; Director: Gouri Patwardhan	₹50,000 (US$520) each
Best Promotional Film	Dreaming Taj Mahal	Hindi and Urdu	Producer: Nirmal Chander; Director: Nirmal Chander	₹50,000 (US$520) each
Best Environment Film including Agriculture	Timbaktu	English	Producer: Public Service Broadcasting Trust; Director: Rintu Thomas and Sushmit Ghosh	₹50,000 (US$520) each
Best Film on Social Issues	Behind The Mist	Malayalam	Producer: Babu Kambrath; Director: Babu Kambrath	₹50,000 (US$520) each
Best Exploration / Adventure Film (Including sports)	Manipuri Pony	English and Manipuri	Producer: Films Division; Director: Aribam Syam Sharma	₹50,000 (US$520) each
Best Investigative Film	Inshallah, Kashmir	English	Producer: Ashvin Kumar; Director: Ashvin Kumar	₹50,000 (US$520) each
Best Short Fiction Film	Kaatal	Marathi	Producer: FTII; Director: Vikrant Pawar	₹50,000 (US$520) each
Best Film on Family Welfare	After Glow	English and Gujarati	Producer: FTII; Director: Kaushal Oza	₹50,000 (US$520) each
Best Cinematography	Kaatal	Marathi	Cameraman: Abhimanyu Dange; Lab: Reliance MediaWorks	₹50,000 (US$520)
Best Cinematography	Shepherds of Paradise	Gojri and Urdu	Cameraman: Raja Shabir Khan	₹50,000 (US$520)
Best Audiography	Do Din Ka Mela	Kutchi	Harikumar M.	₹50,000 (US$520)
Best Editing	Celluloid Man	English, Hindi, Kannada and Bengali	Irene Dhar Malik	₹50,000 (US$520)
Best Narration / Voice Over	Suranjana Deepali	Assamese	Moni Bordoloi	₹50,000 (US$520)
Special Jury Award	I Am Micro	English	Shumona Goel and Shai Heredia (Director)	₹1 lakh (US$1,000)
Special Jury Award	Cancer Katha	English	Vasudha Joshi (Director)	₹1 lakh (US$1,000)
Special Mention	Pinch of Skin	English and Hindi	Priya Goswami (Director)	Certificate only
Special Mention	Allah Is Great	English, Hindi and Danish	Andrea Iannetta (Director)	Certificate only
Special Mention	Raah	–	Sanjay Jangid (Animator)	Certificate only

== Best Writing on Cinema ==
=== Jury ===
A committee of three, headed by Swapan Mullick was appointed to evaluate the nominations for the best writing on Indian cinema. The jury members were as follows:

• Swapan Mullick (Chairperson)
• Shubhra Gupta	• C. S. Venkiteswaran

The Best Writing on Cinema awards are intended to encourage the study and appreciation of cinema as an art form and the dissemination of information and critical appreciation of the medium through books, articles, reviews etc.

=== Golden Lotus Award ===
All the winners were awarded with Swarna Kamal (Golden Lotus Award), cash prize and a certificate.

Name of Award	Name of Book	Language	Awardee(s)	Cash prize
Best Book on Cinema	Silent Cinema in India: A Pictorial Journey	English	Author: B. D. Garga; Publisher: Harper Collins India	₹75,000 (US$780)

Name of Award	Language(s)	Awardee	Cash prize
Best Film Critic	Malayalam	P. S. Radhakrishnan	₹75,000 (US$780)

=== Special Mention ===
All the award winners are awarded with a Certificate of Merit.

Name of Award	Language(s)	Awardee	Cash prize
Special Mention (Film Critic)	English	Piyush Roy	Certificate Only
