= The Immortals (2015 film) =

2015 Indian documentary

- Directed by: Shivendra Singh Dungarpur
- Cinematography: Avik Mukhopadhyay, Avijit Mukul Kishore, H.M. Ramchandra
- Edited by: Irene Dhar Malik
- Music by: Mohandas V.P.
- Release date: October 2015 (Busan)
- Running time: 52 minutes
- Country: India
- Languages: Hindi; Tamil; Bengali; English

The Immortals is an Indian documentary directed by Shivendra Singh Dungarpur.

The documentary was premiered at the 20th Busan International Film Festival in October 2015 and was also shown at the 17th Jio MAMI Mumbai Film Festival. It was screened as the opening film in the Documentary Section at the 21st Kolkata International Film Festival. "The Immortals" (2015) was selected for the National Competition Section at the 14th Mumbai International Film Festival (MIFF) 2016 and won the Special Jury Award that was presented to Shivendra Singh Dungarpur at the closing ceremony on 3 February 2016. The Immortals will be screened at the 30th edition of the Il Cinema Ritrovato Festival in Bologna in June 2016.

== Synopsis ==
This film is a personal journey travelling through time and space to unravel hidden stories and rediscover objects and images that at one time were an integral part of the lives of these artists through which their creations came into being. It is a visual exploration of physical artifacts, personal spaces and living memories where the image speaks for itself, recreating the impression of each artist whilst telling the story of Indian cinema. The film depicts the paradox of India's relationship with cinema: the romance and the power, the neglect and the worship.

Dadasaheb Phalke’s car abandoned by the side of a road; K.L. Saigal’s harmonium fallen silent like his voice; the homes of Satyajit Ray and Baburao Painter where films like Pather Panchali and Savkari Pash took shape; a hundred-year-old cinematographer sifting through letters from Jean Renoir speaking of a deep and abiding friendship; the whirring of the only surviving black and white lab at AVM Studios; the quest for Anthony Gonsalves . . . each image a reminder of how much we have lost, yet evoking memories that live on in spaces, objects and reminiscences of people.
