= Pabung Syam =

2020 Indian documentary film

- Poster
- Directed by: Haobam Paban Kumar
- Produced by: Films Division of India
- Cinematography: Irom Maipak
- Edited by: Sankha
- Music by: Sukanta Majumdar
- Production company: Films Division of India
- Release date: November 2021; (IFFI)
- Running time: 52 minutes
- Country: India
- Language: Meiteilon (Manipuri)

Pabung Syam is a 2021 Manipuri documentary film directed by Haobam Paban Kumar. It is produced by Films Division of India. The film was selected in the non-feature section of the Indian Panorama at the 52nd International Film Festival of India 2021. It won the Best Biographical Film award at the 68th National Film Awards.

Pabung Syam got selection at the 17th Mumbai International Film Festival for Documentary, Short Fiction and Animation films (MIFF) 2022. The film was also screened at the 8th International Film Festival of Shimla 2022 and at the Sangai Film Festival 2022, which was organised as a part of the Manipur Sangai Festival.

== Synopsis ==
The film takes a look at the life and work of Pabung Aribam Syam Sharma through the eyes of one of his admirers and students.

== Accolades ==
Award	Category	Winner's name	Result	Ref.
14th Manipur State Film Awards 2022	Best Biographical Film	Films Division, Mumbai (Producer); Haobam Paban Kumar (Director)	Won	
14th Manipur State Film Awards 2022	Best Editor	Sankha	Won	
14th Manipur State Film Awards 2022	Best Director	Haobam Paban Kumar	Won	
68th National Film Awards	Best Biographical Film	Films Division, Mumbai (Producer); Haobam Paban Kumar (Director)	Won	
