= Supriyo Sen =

Indian film director

- Occupation: Film director
- Years active: 1995 – present
- Awards: Berlin Today Award, National Film Award for Best Non-Feature Film
- Website: https://www.supriyosenfilms.com

Supriyo Sen is an independent filmmaker from India. He produced and directed the film Tangra Blues (2021).

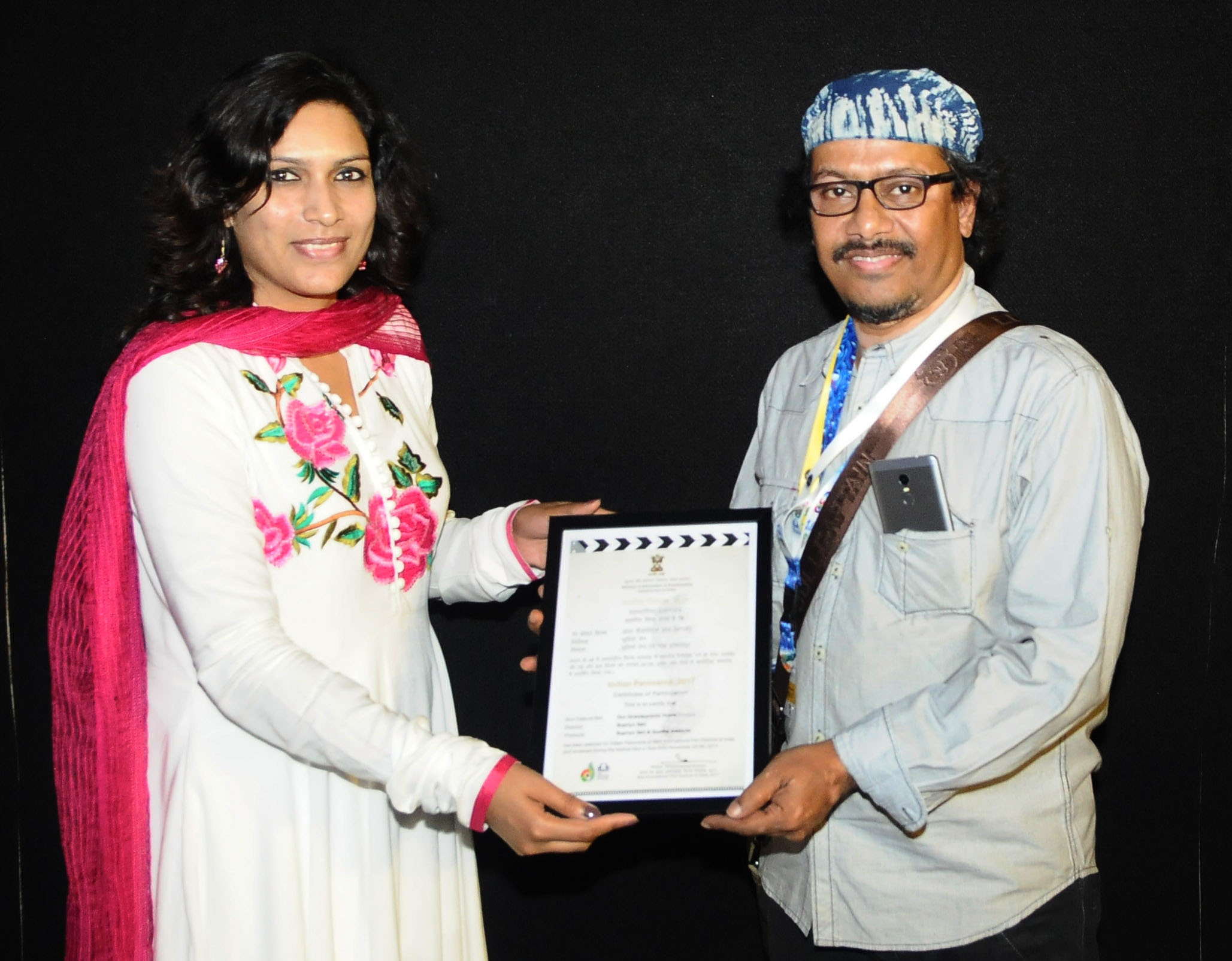
Supriyo Sen (right)

He directed the documentary Wagah which won the Berlin Today award at the Berlin Film Festival, The Nest which won the Best Environment / Conservation / Preservation in 48th National Film awards, Way Back Home which won the Best Film on Social Issues in 51st National Film Award, Hope Dies Last in War which won the National Film Award for Best Non-Feature Film in 55th National Film Awards and Swimming Through The Darkness which won the Best Exploration / Adventure Film (including sports) in 66th National Film awards.

== Works ==
His short documentary Wagah was shown at more than 200 film festivals and was regarded as the third most popular short film in the world in 2009 by German Short Film Magazine. It also won the Berlin Today Award at the Berlin Film Festival. After watching the movie eminent German filmmaker Wim Wenders commented that "Wagah is a manifesto against walls that divides people."

His two hour long feature documentary on the Partition of India, Way Back Home is the first Indian documentary that was commercially released.

Sen is a Berlinale Talent (international young filmmakers program by Berlin Film Festival). He has served as juror at various film festivals, including the Busan International Film Festival, Taiwan International Documentary Festival, DMZ Documentary Festival (Korea), Eagle Award (Indonesia), Kolkata International Film Festival, Dhaka International Short and Documentary Festival, SiGNS (Kerala) and Indian National Award selection.

Alongside directing, he also produced the TV/web series Kaali and Feluda.

He has received grants from Sundance Documentary Fund, Jan Vrijman Fund (IDFA) and Asian Cinema Fund (Busan International Film Festival), DMZ Docs Fund several times and worked with NHK, DW TV, Planet, Goethe Institute, Films Division, PSBT and German, French American and Japanese producers.

== Filmography ==
Year	Title	Category	Duration	Notes	Ref
1995	Wait Until Death	Documentary	54 min		
1997	Dream of Hanif	Documentary Short	26 min		
2000	The Nest	Documentary	40 min	Won National Film award for Best Environment / Conservation / Preservation Film	
2003	Way Back Home	Documentary	120 min	Won National Film award for Best Film on Social Issue	
2007	Hope Dies Last in War	Documentary	80 min	Won National Film award for Best Non-Feature Film	
2008	Rupban - The Beautiful	Documentary Short	26 min		
2009	Wagah	Documentary Short	13 min	Won Berlin Today Award at Berlin International Film Festival	
2011	Games & Peace	Documentary Short	26 min		
2012	New Gift	Documentary Short	3 min		
2013	Unfolding the Pata Story	Documentary	52 min		
2016	Let There be Light	Documentary	52 min		
2017	Our Grandparents Home	Documentary	42 min		
2018	Swimming Through The Darkness	Documentary	76 min	Won Best Exploration / Adventure Film (Including Sports)	
2019	Waste Band	Documentary	52 min		
2021	Tangra Blues	Feature film	129 min		

== Awards ==
Sen has won more than 40 international awards for his films which include Berlin Today Award at Berlin Film Festival, Crystal Globe at Karlovy Vary Film Festival, Grand Prix at Bilbao International Film Festival, BBC Award at Commonwealth Film Festival, Golden Lola (German short film award), Black Pearl Award at Abu Dhabi Film Festival, National Geographic Award at Flickerfest, Golden Conch at Mumbai International Film Festival, as well as Jury and Audience Awards at various festivals including Krakow, Tampere, Hamburg, Uppsala, Munster, Huesca, Winterthur, Damascus, Zagreb, IFFI (Goa), Rio-de-Janeiro, Parnu, Faito, Saguenay.

== Retrospective ==
A retrospective of his films was organized by IDSFFK and SiGNS (Kerala), Persistence and Resistance (New Delhi), International Documentary Festival (Chennai).
