= National Film Award for Best Biographical Film =

Film award in India

- National award for contributions to short film
- Sponsored by: Directorate of Film Festivals
- Rewards: Rajat Kamal (Silver Lotus); ₹50,000
- First award: 1984
- Final award: 2020
- Most recent winner: Pabung Syam

Highlights
- Total awarded: 38
- First winner: Padmashri Kalamandalam Krishnan Nair

The National Film Award for Best Biographical Film was one of the National Film Awards presented annually by the Directorate of Film Festivals, the organisation set up by Ministry of Information and Broadcasting, India. It was one of several awards presented for non-feature films and awarded with Rajat Kamal (Silver Lotus).

The award was instituted in 1984, at 32nd National Film Awards and awarded annually for the short films produced in the year across the country, in all Indian languages. At the 69th National Film Awards, the award is clubbed with National Film Award for Best Historical Reconstruction/Compilation Film, with the new category named as Best Biographical / Historical Reconstruction / Compilation Film.

== Winners ==
Award includes 'Rajat Kamal' (Silver Lotus) and cash prize. Following are the award winners over the years:

Awards legends
Indicates a joint award for the year

List of films, showing the year, language(s), producer(s) and director(s)
Year	Film(s)	Language(s)	Producer(s)	Director(s)	Refs.
1984 (32nd)	Padmashri Kalamandalam Krishnan Nair	Malayalam	James Paul	Matthew Paul	
1985 (33rd)	Satyajit Ray	English	Films Division	Shyam Benegal	
1985 (33rd)	The Seer Who Walks Alone	English	G. Aravindan	G. Aravindan	
1986 (34th)	Sister Alphonsa of Bharananganam	English	• Dejo Kappen • George Sebastian	Rajiv Vijay Raghavan	
1986 (34th)	Kamala Nehru	English	Uma Shankar	Ashish Mukherjee	
1987 (35th)	Basheer: The Man	English	Kannakulam Abdulla	M. R. Rahman	
1988 (36th)	No Award				
1989 (37th)	C. V. Raman: The Scientist and His Legacy	English	N. K. Saigal	Nandan Kudhyadi	
1990 (38th)	Baba	English	Mediart Film Pvt. Ltd	Rajiv Mehrotra	
1991 (39th)	Bhavantarana	Oriya	Bombay Cinematograph	Kumar Shahani	
1991 (39th)	Kabitar Ananta Jatrapathe	Bengali	Department of Information and Cultural Affairs, Government of West Bengal	Sanat Kumar Dasgupta	
1992 (40th)	Pandit Bhimsen Joshi	Hindi	Gulzar for Films Division	Gulzar	
1993 (41st)	Colors of Absence	English	• Shanta Gokhale • Arun Khopkar	Arun Khopkar	
1994 (42nd)	No Award				
1995 (43rd)	A Living Legend	English	Aurora Film Corporation	Satadru Chaki	
1996 (44th)	Hastir Kanya	Assamese	Digbijay Medhi	Prabin Hazarika	
1997 (45th)	Mounam Sowmanasyam	Malayalam	T. Ravindranath	Ravindran	
1998 (46th)	Premji: Ithihasathinte Sparsam	Malayalam	Kerala Sangeetha Nataka Akademi	M. R. Rajan	
1998 (46th)	Unarvinte Kalam: M.R.B.	Malayalam	Kerala Sangeetha Nataka Akademi	M. R. Rajan	
1999 (47th)	Nottam	Malayalam	Bina Narayan	M. R. Rajan	
1999 (47th)	Mallika Sarabhai	English	Films Division	Aruna Raje Patil	
2000 (48th)	Devanarthakan (The Divine Dancer)	Malayalam	A. V. Ali Koya for Kerala State Chalachitra Academy	Sudish Gopalakrishnan	
2001 (49th)	Teejan Bai	Hindi	Kuldeep Sinha for Films Division	V. Packirisamy	
2002 (50th)	Meeting Manjit	English	Ina Puri	Buddhadeb Dasgupta	
2003 (51st)	No Award				
2004 (52nd)	It's Prabhat	Marathi	A. V. Damle	Madhavi Vaidya	
2005 (53rd)	Hans Akela: Kumar Gandharva†	Hindi	Films Division	Jabbar Patel	
2006 (54th)	Minukku	Malayalam	• Devadasan Keezhpatt • Bina Narayanan	M. R. Rajan	
2006 (54th)	Guru Laimayum Thambalngoubi Devi	Manipuri	Aribam Syam Sharma	Aribam Syam Sharma	
2007 (55th)	Antardhwani†	Hindi	Films Division	Jabbar Patel	
2008 (56th)	The Assassination of Rajiv Gandhi: A Reconstruction	English	Films Division	R. Krishna Mohan	
2009 (57th)	Pancham Unmixed	• Bengali • Hindi • English	Brahmanand S Siingh	Brahmanand S Siingh	
2010 (58th)	Nilamadhaba	English	Films Division	Dilip Patnaik	
2011 (59th)	Vishnupant Damle: Bolpatancha Mook Nayak†	Marathi	Anil Anant Damle	Virendra Valsangkar	
2012 (60th)	Celluloid Man†	• English • Hindi • Kannada • Bengali	Shivendra Singh Dungarpur	Shivendra Singh Dungarpur	
2013 (61st)	The Last Adieu†	English	Films Division	Shabnam Sukhdev	
2014 (62nd)	Amar Katha: Story of Binodini†	Bengali	Films Division	Tuhinabha Majumder	
2015 (63rd)	Life in Metaphors: A Portrait of Girish Kasaravalli†	• English • Kannada	Reelism Film	O. P. Shrivastava	
2016 (64th)	Zikr Us Parivaksha: Begum Akhtar†	English	Sangeet Natak Akademi	Nirmal Chander	
2017 (65th)	Naachi se Baanchi†		Films Division of India	Biju Toppo	
2017 (65th)	Sword of Liberty†		R. C. Suresh	Shiny Benjamin	
2018 (66th)	No Award				
2019 (67th)	Elephants Do Remember†	English	Films Division of India	Swati Pandey, Viplove Rai Bhatia & Manohar Singh Bisht	
2020 (68th)	Pabung Syam†	Manipuri	Films Division of India	Haobam Paban Kumar	
