= CzechMate: In Search of Jiří Menzel =

2018 documentary by Shivendra Singh Dungarpur

- Film poster
- Directed by: Shivendra Singh Dungarpur
- Produced by: Dungarpur Films; Teesha Elizabeth Cherian
- Starring: Jiří Menzel
- Cinematography: David Calek, Ranjan Palit, K. U. Mohanan, Jonathan Bloom
- Edited by: Irene Dhar Malik
- Music by: V. P. Mohandas (sound design)
- Release date: 2018
- Running time: 448 minutes
- Countries: India, Czech Republic, Slovakia
- Languages: Czech, English, Slovak, Hungarian, Polish and French

CzechMate: In Search of Jiří Menzel is a 2018 documentary film directed by Shivendra Singh Dungarpur that focuses on the life and work of the film director Jiří Menzel, and also explores the Czechoslovak New Wave cinema of the 1950-70s.

It is the longest Indian film production to have been certified by the Central Board of Film Certification.

== Synopsis ==
The documentary features the work of some 20 Czech and Slovak filmmakers and interviews artists who were influenced by the cinema, including Ken Loach, Věra Chytilová, Miloš Forman, Vojtěch Jasný, Ivan Passer, Juraj Jakubisko, Andrzej Wajda, Dušan Hanák, Štefan Uher, Jan Němec, and Miroslav Ondříček. Some of the filmmakers featured, like Jan Němec, Věra Chytilová, Andrzej Wajda, Miloš Forman and Juraj Herz, died during the production and therefore the documentary captures their last appearance on film.

== Production ==
In an interview with Firstpost, Dungarpur said: "It's taken me nearly eight years to complete this documentary. I never knew that it would become a seven-hour-long film. I just wanted to meet and spend time with the director Jiří Menzel, who made Closely Watched Trains (1966). I lost sleep over thinking about how he could have made an almost perfect film; so light and beautiful that you keep smiling, yet dealing with the oppression depicted in it."

Filmed over eight years, the seven-and-a-half-hour long documentary mixes archival footage, clips from classic films, and in-depth interviews with directors, actors, writers, critics and crew members who were associated with the New Wave.

In 2010, Menzel decided to meet Dungarpur, who had been trying to get in touch with him, in Prague. Their conversation led to Dungarpur discovering the Czech New Wave cinema and the work of other influential directors and visual artists. Dungarpur then visited Prague, along with his team, for seven years to interview the filmmakers and their collaborators who were associated with the New Wave movement. One of the reasons why the film took almost eight years to make was obstacles in sourcing film clips. Dungarpur said in an interview, "We had to constantly watch and re-watch films to see what we wanted to use. Since most of the films were produced by the former Czechoslovakia government, they were located in the state archives. We have permissions for all the clips, for every photograph used. That is why this film took so many years." The research on the filmmakers and their work was done by Sunil Gopaldas Jhurani who was also the Chief Assistant Director on the project.

== Release ==
In 2018, the documentary was certified by the Central Board of Film Certification, thus becoming the longest Indian feature film to have been certified. The length of the film, about 7.5 hours, became a hurdle in finding distributors and slots for screenings and film festivals. It was finally screened at Italy's Il Cinema Ritrovato, Mumbai Film Festival, Kolkata Film Festival, and there were standalone screenings at the UCLA Film and Television Archive, Prague, London, Bratislava. In July 2020, the documentary was released by Second Run on Blu-ray.

== Reception ==
The film was critically acclaimed and received positive reviews. Scroll.in wrote: "Shivendra Singh Dungarpur's monumental tribute to one of the most exciting film movements will soon start touring the arthouse circuit." The response at the screening for Czech and Slovakian embassies in Delhi was "incredible", and Dungapur states that the "Czechs were literally crying by the end, while the Indians came out saying that there were lots of things that they didn't know." Some critics questioned the length of the film, but acknowledged that the film is "labour of love" and a "love letter to the Czech New Wave".

== See also ==
- List of longest films
