= National Film Award for Best Editing (non-feature film) =

Indian film award

- National award for contributions to non-feature films
- Sponsored by: National Film Development Corporation of India
- Rewards: Rajat Kamal (Silver Lotus); ₹2,00,000
- First award: 1990
- Most recent winner: Niladri Roy, Moving Focus (2023)

The National Film Award for Best Editing is one of the National Film Awards presented annually by the National Film Development Corporation of India. It is one of several awards presented for non-feature films and awarded with Rajat Kamal (Silver Lotus).

The award was instituted in 1990 at the 38th National Film Awards and awarded annually for short films produced in the year across the country, in all Indian languages.

== Winners ==
Award includes 'Rajat Kamal' (Silver Lotus) and cash prize. Following are the award winners over the years:

List of award recipients, showing the year (award ceremony), film(s) and language(s)
| Year | Recipient(s) | Film(s) | Language(s) | Refs. |
|---|---|---|---|---|
| 1990 (38th) | Rajasekharan | Mohiniyattam | English | |
| 1991 (39th) | Rajesh Parmar | Sanchari | English | |
| 1992 (40th) | K. R. Bose | Kalarippayat | English | |
| 1993 (41st) | Rajesh Parmar | Colors of Absence | English | |
| 1994 (42nd) | Paresh Kamdar | Rasayatra | Hindi and English | |
| 1995 (43rd) | B. Lenin | Kutravali | Tamil | |
| 1995 (43rd) | V. T. Vijayan | Oodaha | Tamil | |
| 1996 (44th) | A. Sreekar Prasad | Nauka Charitramu | English | |
| 1997 (45th) | Ujjal Nandy | Jataner Jami | Bengali | |
| 1998 (46th) | Reena Mohan | In The Forest Hangs a Bridge | English | |
| 1999 (47th) | Ajit Kumar | Of Confucius, S-Spots and Toy guns | English, Hindi, Marathi and Tamil | |
| 2000 (48th) | Sankalp Meshram | Lokpriya | Hindi | |
| 2001 (49th) | Ajith | Athman | Universal | |
| 2002 (50th) | Prathapan P. | 00:00 | English | |
| 2003 (51st) | Beena Paul | Unni | Malayalam | |
| 2004 (52nd) | Prashant Naik | Harvest of Hunger | English and Odia | |
| 2005 (53rd) | Vibuti Nathjha | Naina Jogin | Hindi and Maithili | |
| 2006 (54th) | Amitabh Chakraborty | Bishar Blues | Bengali | |
| 2006 (54th) | Amit Debnath | Bishar Blues | Bengali | |
| 2007 (55th) | Saikat Ray | Hope Dies Last in War | English and Hindi | |
| 2008 (56th) | Manoj Kannoth | Stations | Hindi, Marathi and English | |
| 2009 (57th) | Tarun Bhartiya | In Camera | English | |
| 2010 (58th) | Tinni Mitra | Germ | Hindi | |
| 2011 (59th) | Iram Ghufran | There is Something in the Air | Hindi, Urdu and English | |
| 2012 (60th) | Irene Dhar Malik | Celluloid Man | English, Hindi, Kannada and Bengali | |
| 2013 (61st) | Arjun Gaurisaria | Gulabi Gang | Hindi and Bundelkhandi | |
| 2014 (62nd) | Andi Campbell Waite | Tigress Blood | English | |
| 2015 (63rd) | Parvin Angre | Breaking Free | English | |
| 2015 (63rd) | Sridhar Rangayan | Breaking Free | English | |
| 2016 (64th) | Jishnu Sen | Gudh | | |
| 2017 (65th) | Sanjiv Monga | Mrityubhoj: The Death Feast | | |
| 2017 (65th) | Tenzin Kunchok | Mrityubhoj: The Death Feast | | |
| 2018 (66th) | Hemanti Sarkar | Son Rise | | |
| 2019 (67th) | Arjun Gourisaria | Shut Up Sona | Hindi and English | |
| 2020 (68th) | Anadi Athaley | Borderlands | Bengali, Nepali, Manipuri, Hindi, and Punjabi | |
| 2021 (69th) | Abhro Banerjee | If Memory Serves Me Right | English | |
| 2022 (70th) | Suresh Urs | Madhyantara | Kannada | |
| 2023 (71st) | Niladri Roy | Moving Focus | English | |
| 2024 (72nd) | Manvir Jasrotia | NDA | Hindi | |
