= Meghnath =

Indian documentary filmmaker

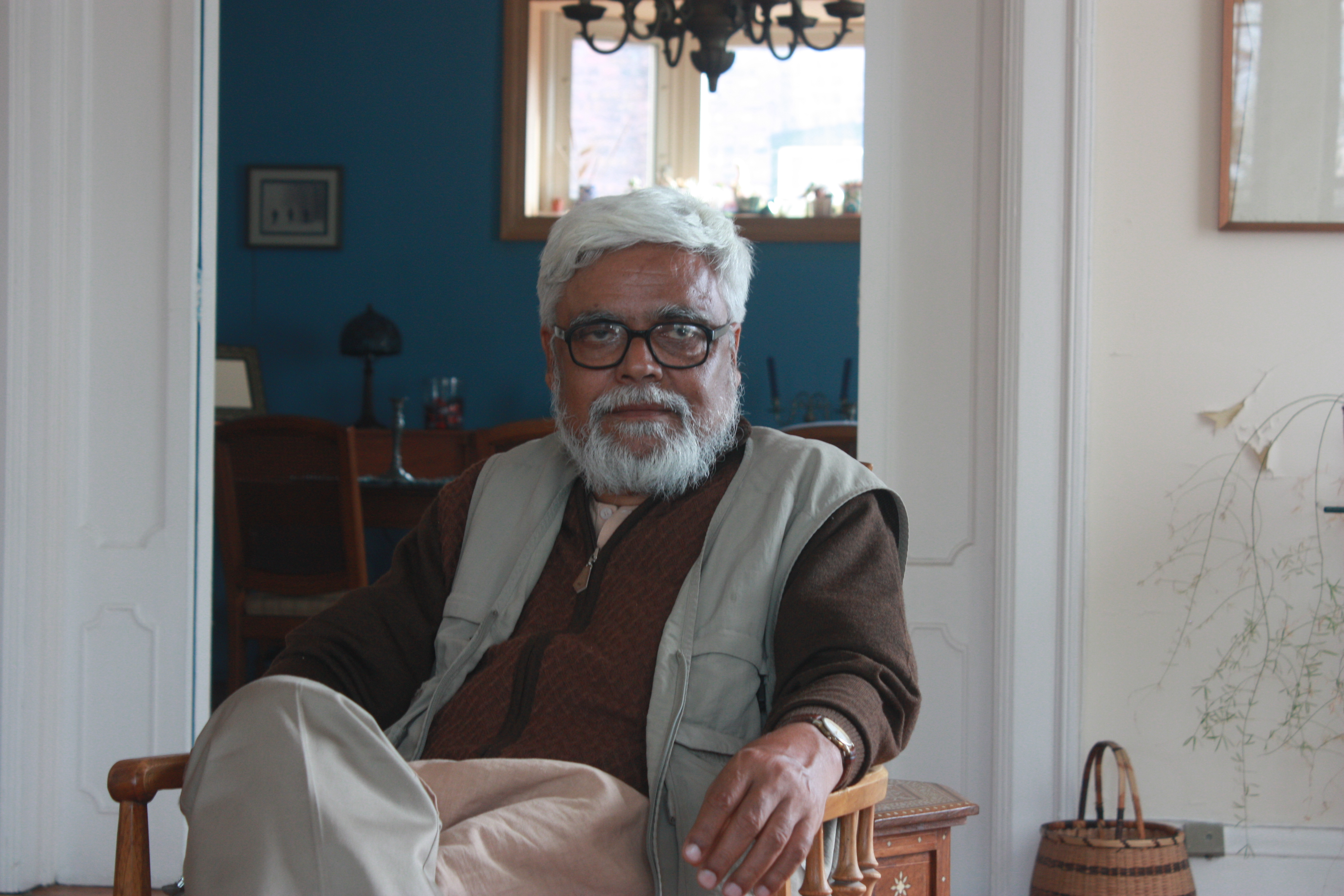
- Born: 29 June 1953; Bombay, Bombay State (now Mumbai, Maharashtra, India)
- Education: St. Xavier's College, Kolkata
- Occupations: Director, Producer, Social Activist
- Years active: 1971–present
- Notable work: Naachi Se Baanchi, Iron is Hot, The Hunt, Gadi Lohardaga Mail, In Search of Ajantrik
- Children: 1
- Honours: 59th National Film Awards & 65th National Film Awards

Meghnath is a filmmaker and activist who has been working in Jharkhand for the last 40 years. He has been with the people’s struggle against destructive development. As a filmmaker, along with Biju Toppo, he has tried to document the voice of those sections of people who remain unheard. Meghnath was awarded the prestigious 59th National Film Award and 65th National Film Awards.

== Introduction ==
Meghnath was born on 29 June 1953 in Bombay of Bombay State (now Mumbai of Maharashtra). He did his schooling in Bombay and started social work in 1971 in the refugee camps of the Bangladesh Liberation War. He started rural development work in the National Service Scheme (NSS) under the guidance of Fr. Gerard Beckers and worked as a volunteer for the Students Health Home, a co-operative health movement of the students with 3 lakh members. He was elected the Joint Secretary of Health Home for the years 1975 to 1977. Meghnath completed his graduation from St. Xavier's College, Kolkata, in 1977 and was the organizer of the highest voluntary blood donor in 1977 and 1978. He did his diploma in social work at the Indian Social Institute, Bangalore, in 1980 and came to Palamu district in 1981 to work on the issue of bonded labor in Jharkhand and eventually participated in the people's struggle to save the land, water, and forest. He was part of the Jharkhand Movement and was the founder member of the Jharkhand Coordination Committee (JCC) along with B. P. Keshri, Sanjay Basu Mallick, N. E. Horo, Bishop Nirmal Minj, and others. He did a short course on filmmaking at the Notre Dame Communication Centre, Patna, in 1988 and at CENDIT, New Delhi, in 1989. In 1990, he did a Film Appreciation Course from FTII, Pune, and the National Film Archive of India and also became a part of the National Alliance of People's Movements (NAPM) and was part of Narmada Bachao Andolan along with Medha Patkar and participated in fasting for 22 days on the banks of Narmada. He also worked with reputed documentary filmmakers Tapan Bose and Suhasini Mulay in 1989-91, and he started discussion and debate on the pro-people development models in predominately Adivasi areas and was the founder member of Pani Chetna Manch along with members of the People's Science Institute. He worked on an alternative irrigation model and was part of making 125 small check dams (Ahar) and pines in Palamu district in 1993-95 under Sukha Mukti Abhiyan.

In 1993, he formed the group AKHRA to work in the field of culture and communication along with others. He was the guest faculty of the Mass Communication and Journalism department in St. Xavier's College, Ranchi. In the last 40 years of social and cultural work, he has had the opportunity to work and learn from many great people, and to name a few, they are Fr. Gerard Beckers, Debabrata Roy, Mother Teresa, Pannalal Das Gupta, Bishop George Sopien, B. P. Keshri, Tapan Bose, Suhasini Mulay, Satish Bahadur, P. K. Nair, Baba Amte, Sunderlal Bahuguna, Medha Patkar, and Ram Dayal Munda. He considers filmmaking as the extension of his social and cultural work. Along with Biju Toppo, he has worked in more than 15 films that have received national and international recognition.

== Filmography ==
Year	Film	Director	Producer	Editor	Language	Notes
1996	Saheed Jo Anjan Rahe	Biju Toppo	AKHRA	Biju Toppo	Hindi	Saheed Jo Anjan Rahe (Unknown Martyrs), is a film about the brutal massacre of the indigenous persons on April 19, 1985, in which a former Member of Parliament named Fr. Anthony Murmu and fourteen others were killed in Banjhi, Sahebganj district of Jharkhand over a minor pond dispute at Banjhi. It is often termed as "Banjhi Massacre".
1997	Ek Hadsa Aur Bhee	Biju Toppo	AKHRA	Biju Toppo	Hindi	Ek Hadsa Aur Bhee (Yet Another Accident) is a film about a controversial dam incident in August 1997 which took place in Palamu district of Jharkhand. In order to silence the villagers’ protests against the construction of the Kutku-Mandal Dam, the temporary /sluice gate of the dam was shut. Thirty-two nearby villages were submerged overnight in the resulting floods, and approximately 1100 families were affected. Twenty-one people drowned, a large number of animals died and a lot of people’s property and goods were destroyed.
1998	Jaha Chinti Ladi Hathi Se (Where Ants are Fighting Elephants)					About indigenous peoples’ struggle against bauxite mining.
2000	Hamare Gaon Me Hamara Raj	Biju Toppo	Biju Toppo	Biju Toppo	Hindi	Hamare Gaon Me Hamara Raj (Tribal Self Rule) is a film on Panchayati Raj Extension in Scheduled Areas Act 1996. The film deals with the Grama Sabha movement.
2003	Vikas Bandook Ki Nal Se	Biju Toppo and Meghnath	AKHRA	Raja	Hindi	Vikas Bandook Ki Nal Se (Development Flows from the Barrel of the Guns) is a film which presents and examines orchestrated state violence against indigenous and local peoples when they rally and protest against development projects on their lands. Rather than focusing on a single instance, the filmmakers strengthen their thesis by recording examples from all over the country: Orissa, Jharkhand, Madhya Pradesh, Gujarat and Chhattisgarh. In each case, using the local police force, the state has brutalised and killed protestors, often on trumped-up charges of violence.
2004	From Kalinga to Kashipur					On the people’s struggle against an aluminium factory in Kashipur block of Koraput district in Orissa.
2005	Kora Rajee	Biju Toppo			Kurukh	Kora Rajee (The land of the diggers) is the first film in Kurukh, a tribal language. The film is on the issue of Adivasi labourers in the tea-garden communities of Assam and Bengal.
2007	Khorar desher joler kotha (Story of water from the land of drought)					On best practices of preservation and use of water in Purulia a drought-prone district of West-Bengal.
2007	Power for change					Is on use alternative development in rural Orissa especially on the use of Micro-Hydel power.
2009	100 Din Milega Kaam (100 days of work for you)					It is a film on the National Rural Employment Guarantee Act that promises to provide 100 days of work in the rural area and what is the ground reality.
2010	Loha Garam Hai (Iron is hot)	Biju Toppo and Meghnath	AKHRA	Biju Toppo	Hindi	It is on the issue of the sponge iron industry and its pollution and how people are trying to cope with it.
2010	Gadi Lohardaga Mail	Biju Toppo and Meghnath	AKHRA	B. Ajit	Hindi and Jharkhand folk songs	Nostalgic songs on the narrow gauge. Lohardaga passenger train which became history in January 2004.
2010	Ek Ropa Dhan					It is a film on the SRI method of rice cultivation, that explains how productivity can be increased by just changing the process of cultivation.
2010	Mukta Gyana Kutir					It is a film on alternative education for tribal girls who were dropout from regular schools. In the remote area of Orissa.
2011	Sona Gahi Pinjra	Biju Toppo			Kurukh	Sona Gahi Pinjra (The Golden Cage) is a film in Kurukh language which portrays about those people who desire to participate in their village festivals but are deprived because of their job. The film depicts how mobile phone becomes the living link in this situation.
2015	Taking Side	Biju Toppo and Meghnath	Forum of Religious	Biju Toppo and Deepak Bara	Hindi and English	For centuries people have laid down their life taking side with the oppressed. This film is the story of Sr. Valsa John. She was born in Kerala and worked for the Adivasi of Jharkhand. She leads the struggle against coal mining and laid down her life.
2015	Accumulated Injustice	Biju Toppo and Meghnath	AKHRA	Biju Toppo	Hindi	Adivasi people’s living condition on the dark side of Rourkela Steel Plant.
2015	The Hunt	Biju Toppo	Rajiv Mehrotra,-Ridhima Mehra and Tulika Srivastava	Deepak Bara	English & Hindi	Today, our Government thinks Maoist is a major threat to internal security. They want to eliminate them from the red corridor as Maoist is a hindrance to secure the mineral resources of these areas for the corporate partners. Tribal who are fighting to save their ancestral land, are branded as Maoist. The Film ‘The Hunt’ explores the lives of the people sandwiched between Maoist and the State.
2017	Naachi Se Baanchi (Those who dance will survive)	Biju Toppo and Meghnath	Films Division of India	Amit Bahadur	Hindi	In his lifetime itself Dr Ram DayalMunda has become a symbol of indigenous cultural reawakening.Ram DayalMunda was the leading intellectual who has contributed to Jharkhand movement immensely. Dr Munda has represented Adivasi voices in RajyaShabha and United Nations. He has been awarded Sahitya Academy Award and Padmashree in 2009. He died in September 2011.
2018	Mundari Srishtikatha	Tuhin Paul	Meghnath	Rupesh Kr Sahu	Hindi	Unlike us, our children have missed the opportunity to hear folklore from their elders. Folklore helps and give us dignity and self-esteem and is helpful in building our personality. This is AKHRA's humble effort to narrate the creation of myths. These stories were created thousands of years ago when is science was not as developed as it is today. So we must enjoy them, but always keep a scientific approach to life.
2018	Jharia (The Spring)	Biju Toppo	Public Service Broadcasting Trust	Rupesh Kr Sahu	Hindi	It’s a film about an eighty-five-year-old man, Simon Oraon, The Water Man from Jharkhand who has been working relentlessly on water management and environmental protection in the villages of Jharkhand since he was fourteen.
2020	Sohrai	Biju Toppo and Meghnath	Dr. Ramdayal Munda Tribal Research Institute Ranchi	Rupesh Kr Sahu	Hindi	It is a film about celebrating the festival of Sohrai in the month of Kartik (October/November) by Santhals who are the biggest Adivasi community of Jharkhand.
2020	Karam	Biju Toppo and Meghnath	Dr. Ramdayal Munda Tribal Research Institute Ranchi	Rupesh Kr Sahu	Hindi	It is a film about celebrating the festival of Karam. It is dedicated to the worship of Karam-Devta (Karam-Lord/God), the god of power, youth, and youthfulness. The festival is held on the 11th day of a full moon (Purnima) of the Hindu month of Bhado (Bhadra), which falls between August and September
2022	Rat Trap	Rupesh Sahu	Biju Toppo and Meghnath	Rupesh Kr Sahu	Hindi	It is a film about the rat-hole coal miners who risk their lives to earn a livelihood. While doing this activity, many mishaps go unreported, which we cannot see from the outside. Their lives are devastating enough that they are called thieves in their own house, and during a case of mine collapse, they cannot even shed a tear or claim their loved ones’ body. This film narrates their daily life.
2024	In Search of Ajantrik	Meghnath	Biju Toppo	Sheshank Jaiswal	Hindi	It’s a film about the director’s journey, who is searching for Adivasi (Indigenous people of India) philosophy in reference to Ritwik Ghatak’s film “Ajantrik”.

== Film awards ==
List of awards conferred on films made by AKHRA
Year	Awards	Awarding body	Film	Refs.
2004	Travelling Film Southasia (TFSA)	Travelling Film Southasia (TFSA)	Vikas Banook Ki Nal Se (Development Flows from the Barrel of the Guns)	
2005	Vatavaran Star Award for Best Documentary	CMS Vatavaran	Vikas Banook Ki Nal Se (Development Flows from the Barrel of the Guns)	
2006	Second Best Documentary Film / Video	Mumbai International Film Festival	Kora Rajee (The land of the diggers)	
2009	Best Environmental Film Award	Indian Documentary Producers’ Association (IDPA)	Loha Garam Hai (Iron is Hot)	
2010	58th National Film Awards	Directorate of Film Festivals	Loha Garam Hai (Iron is Hot)	
2010	Silver Medal	Indian Documentary Producers’ Association (IDPA)	Ek Ropa Dhan	
2010	58th National Film Awards	Directorate of Film Festivals	Ek Ropa Dhan	
2011	Best Short Film Award	International Folk Music Film Festival, Nepal	Gadi Lohardaga Mail	
2015	Special Jury Award	CMS Vatavaran Environment and Wildlife Film Festival	The Hunt	
2016	Best Documentary Award	International Documentary and Short Film Festival of Kerala	The Hunt	
2016	Best Documentary Award	International Film Festival of Shimla	The Hunt	
2016	Cinema of Resistance	SiGNS Festival, Kerala	The Hunt	
2017	Golden Bodhisattva Award	Bodhisattva International Film Festival in Patna	The Hunt	
2018	65th National Film Awards	Directorate of Film Festivals	Naachi se Baanchi	
2018	Jury Mention Award	Mumbai International Film Festival	Naachi se Baanchi	
2018	Special Jury Documentary	International Film Festival of Shimla	Naachi se Baanchi	
2022	Satyajit Ray Silver Award	6th South Asian Short Film Festival Kolkata	Rat Trap	
2024	Satyajit Ray Golden Award	7th South Asian Short Film Festival Kolkata	In Search of Ajantrik	
2024	Best Long Documentary	10th Shimla International Film Festival	In Search of Ajantrik	
2024	Best Documentary Award	17th SiGNS International Film Festival, Kerala	In Search of Ajantrik	
2024	Special Jury Mention Award	South Asian Documentary Film Festival, Nepal	In Search of Ajantrik	
