= Way Back Home (2003 film) =

2003 documentary film

- Directed by: Supriyo Sen
- Produced by: Rajasri Mukhopadhyay
- Cinematography: Ranjan Palit
- Edited by: Sumit Ghosh
- Release date: 2003
- Running time: 120 minutes
- Country: India
- Language: Bengali

Way Back Home is a 2003 documentary film directed by Supriyo Sen and produced by his wife, Rajasri Mukhopadhyay. The film received a National Film Award from the Government of India, the Sundance Documentary Grant and the Asian Network of Documentary Award from the Pusan International Film Festival.

The film follows an Indian couple on their emotional journey back to their homeland before Partition.

== Screening ==
The documentary was featured at the Film Festival on Secularism in Chennai. The film won the Golden Conch, along with the Special Jury and Best Film awards at MIFF 2004.

The film was also incorporated into South Asian studies in various institutions.

== Awards ==
- National Film Award for Best Film on Social Issues
- Sundance Documentary Grant
- Asian Network of Documentary Award
- International Jury Award at the 8th Mumbai International Film Festival
