= Raja Shabir Khan =

Indian documentary filmmaker

- Education: PG diploma in direction and screenplay writing, Satyajit Ray Film and Television Institute

Raja Shabir Khan is an Indian documentary filmmaker from Kashmir who won two National Film Awards for his movie Shepherds of Paradise, Best Non-Feature Film and Best Cinematography at the 60th National Film Awards in 2013.

== Early life and career ==
Khan was inspired by his father, an art lover, to pursue filmmaking. Khan began creating documentary films while still in school. During his school years, he directed and wrote the short film Pagla Baba, which earned him the Bronze Remi Award at the World Film Festival 2007 in Houston, Texas.

Hailing from the Chanapora area on the outskirts of Srinagar, Khan graduated and did a PG Diploma in direction and screenplay writing from the Satyajit Ray Film and Television Institute in Kolkata.

Khan received widespread acclaim for his first independent documentary, Angels of Troubled Paradise. The film aimed to portray the hardships of a child who gathers and sells scrap from tear smoke shells to make a living. It was broadcast in Tokyo, Singapore, and various international festivals.

His film Banafshe was showcased at the Osian's Film Festival in New Delhi and received wide acclaim and praise.

In 2013, Khan received two National Film Awards for Shepherds of Paradise, the Best Non-Feature Film and Best Cinematography at the 60th National Film Awards. The movie was featured at the Guwahati International Film Festival, hosted by Jyoti Chitraban Film Studio, a government entity in Assam, in collaboration with the Dr. Bhupen Hazarika Regional Government Film and Television Institute in Guwahati. The documentary was also broadcast in Singapore, South Korea, the United States, and Japan, in addition to being featured in festivals worldwide. The film depicts the challenges faced by the Bakerwals, nomadic shepherds in Kashmir, as they strive to sustain their way of life.

He has also produced several other documentaries, including Fear and Freedom, Vanishing Glaciers, Line of Control, and The Last Hope.

Khan has served as a jury member at the National Students Film Festival and the Himalayan Future Festival held in Ladakh.

His upcoming film, Rugby, Crows, and Hijab, explores the theme of overcoming challenges.

== Documentaries ==
- Pagla Baba
- Angels of Troubled Paradise
- Banafshe
- Shepherds of Paradise
- Fear and Freedom
- Vanishing Glaciers
- Line of Control
- The Last Hope
