= Shepherds of Paradise =

2013 documentary film

- Directed by: Raja Shabir Khan
- Produced by: Raja Shabir Khan
- Release date: 2013
- Running time: 50 minutes
- Country: India
- Languages: Gojri, Urdu

Shepherds of Paradise is a 2013 documentary film directed and produced by Raja Shabir Khan in Gojri and Urdu. The film won awards for Best Non-Feature Film and Best Cinematography at the 60th National Film Awards in 2013. Focusing on the nomadic lives of Gujjar and Bakerwal shepherds in Jammu and Kashmir, the documentary explores the challenges they encounter during their annual migration from the Jammu plains to the Kashmir valley.

== Synopsis ==
The documentary follows seventy-five-year-old Gafoor, a Bakerwal shepherd in Kashmir, who annually rebuilds his mountain dwelling due to weather damage. Gafoor and his family undertake a challenging journey from Jammu to Kashmir, covering nearly 300 kilometers on foot. The migration is a ritual to graze their herd of 200 animals, including sheep, goats, a cow, and ponies. Gafoor bears the responsibility of safely leading the caravan through steep terrains and unpredictable weather, taking 27 days. This year's journey becomes more challenging as one of Gafoor's goats, Timra, breaks its leg. The documentary explores Gafoor's negotiation with these challenges and his determination to navigate the Pir Panchal mountains.

== Screenings ==
In 2013, Shepherds of Paradise was screened at Picturetime's inflatable theatre during the Himalayan Film Festival in Ladakh. It also featured at the 44th International Film Festival of India 2013 in Goa. The documentary was telecasted in Singapore, South Korea, the US, Japan, and showcased at festivals worldwide, including a three-day festival organized by the Assam-government-owned Jyoti Chitraban Film Studio in Guwahati.

== Awards and recognition ==
Shepherds of Paradise won Best Non-Feature Film and Best Cinematography at the 60th National Film Awards. The documentary was commended for portraying the lives of nomadic shepherd Gujjars-Bakerwals in Jammu and Kashmir. It shared the Best Cinematography award with the Marathi film Kaatal.
