= Tangra Blues =

2021 Indian Bengali musical thriller film

- Official release poster
- Directed by: Supriyo Sen
- Screenplay by: Supriyo Sen; Parambrata Chatterjee
- Story by: Supriyo Sen
- Produced by: Shree Venkatesh Films
- Starring: Parambrata Chatterjee; Madhumita Sarcar
- Cinematography: Ranjan Palit
- Edited by: Sumit Chowdhury
- Music by: Nabarun Bose
- Production companies: Shree Venkatesh Films; Roadshow Films
- Distributed by: Shree Venkatesh Films; Hoichoi
- Release date: 15 April 2021
- Country: India
- Language: Bengali

Tangra Blues is a 2021 Indian Bengali language musical-thriller film directed by Supriyo Sen for producers Shree Venkatesh Films. Starring Parambrata Chatterjee and Madhumita Sarcar, the film revolves around music-maker Joyee (Madhumita Sarcar) and a music band leader Sanjib Mondal (Parambrata Chatterjee). It was released on 15 April 2021, coinciding with Bangla Noboborsho.

== Synopsis ==
The story of the film is about a musical band in a slum of Kolkata. It follows the band leader, Sanjib Mondal (Parambrata Chatterjee), and a music-maker, Joyee (Madhumita Sarkar). She is drawn by the performances of the band members, who are slum kids. Then begins their musical journey and fight for a confident future in the shadows of vicious gang wars.

== Cast ==
- Parambrata Chatterjee as Sanjib Mondal.
- Madhumita Sarcar as Joyee
- Samiul Alam as Chalu
- Oishani Dey as Pori
- Atmadeep Ghosh as Nobby

== Production ==
The film shot in a slum of Kolkata, is directed by National Award winning director Supriyo Sen. The lead actor of the film Parambrata Chatterjee said, “Shooting for Tangra Blues has been a memorable experience with challenges and fun at the same time.”

== Crew ==
Sohini Mukherjee was brought onboard to serve as the Associate Director. Anindit roy was signed to compose the music for the film. The technical team of the film consists of cinematographer Ranjan Palit, editor Sumit Chowdhury and production designer Riddhie Basak.

== Reception ==
Sankhayan Ghosh of Film Companion terming it as 'A ‘Well-Made’ Film Without A Soul' wrote, "Supriyo Sen’s film, starring Parambrata Chatterjee, plays like an uneasy alliance between two different schools of filmmaking". Ishita Sengupta writing for The Indian Express found the film 'a rare outing which seamlessly accommodates current politics in the narrative'. Sengupta praising the performance of Samiul Alam as Charles Murmu, concluded, "In a country where poverty is in abundance, rage is the only byproduct and music a singular avenue that can camouflage a scream for a note. If only it hit better."

== Soundtrack ==
The music of the film is composed by Nabarun Bose. The first single, whose music is inspired by Sanjay Mandal Group and lyrics by Pranjal was released on 8 April 2021. Subsequently the other tracks were released.

Track listing
No.	Title	Lyrics	Singer(s)	Length
1.	"Ei Toh Amar Desh"	Pranjal	Surajeet Mukherjee (Koushik)	4:14
2.	"Baburam Shapure"	Pranjal	Surajeet Mukherjee (Koushik)	3:25
3.	"Rupkotha Noy"	Pranjal	Surajeet Mukherjee (Koushik)	5:24

== Awards and nominations ==
Year	Award	Category	Recipient(s)	Result	Ref.
2022	Filmfare Awards East	Best Supporting Actor	Samiul Alam	Won	
