= Hope Dies Last in War =

- Directed by: Supriyo Sen
- Produced by: Supriyo Sen
- Release date: 2007
- Country: India
- Language: Hindi

Hope Dies Last in War is a 2007 documentary directed and produced by Supriyo Sen. The film received the Best Documentary Award at the 55th National Film Awards and was included in the India Panorama at the International Film Festival of India (IFFI). The documentary was filmed between 2004 and 2007.

== Overview ==
During the 14-day India-Pakistan war that commenced on 3 December 1971, over 92,000 Pakistani soldiers were captured by India in the western sector, and nearly 500 Indian defense personnel were taken as prisoners by Pakistan. Following the Shimla Agreement of 1972 between Z.A. Bhutto and Indira Gandhi, a prisoner exchange took place.

However, the fate of 54 Indian soldiers remains unknown. Despite over 200 Indian soldiers being repatriated from Pakistan, the last expected train bringing the remaining soldiers did not arrive. Pakistan asserted that no more prisoners of war (PoWs) were in their custody, leading the Indian Government to advise families to presume the missing soldiers as deceased and accept monetary compensation.

The uncertainty surrounding the 54 soldiers prompted some families to reject the government's stance. Their lives became centered on an unending quest for the truth, desperate to uncover the fate of their loved ones. Some parents died while waiting, some children lost hope faced with bureaucratic obstacles, some spouses remarried, and a few individuals resorted to drastic measures like suicide.

== Awards and screenings ==
The documentary received a grant from the Sundance Documentary Fund and Pusan International Film Festival. It was screened at festivals like Pusan in South Korea and Yamagata in Japan.Cinematographer Ranjan Palit received the IDPA (Indian Documentary Producers’ Association) Gold Award.

== Reception ==
The Hollywood Reporter wrote "Hope’s biggest problem is its lack of opposing views: The Pakistani side of the story is never truly addressed. That’s consistent, however, with the film’s overall apolitical tone with little mentions of war’s major players, Indira Gandhi, Zulfikar Ali Bhutto and Yahya Khan, or even the background to that conflict."

Madhuparna Das of The Telegraph India wrote "Hope Dies Last in War is a heart-rending documentary that compels us to think: especially of the fact that we are so impossibly helpless not just as individuals, but also as a community, a nation, a race."
