= Shivendra Singh Dungarpur =

Indian film director

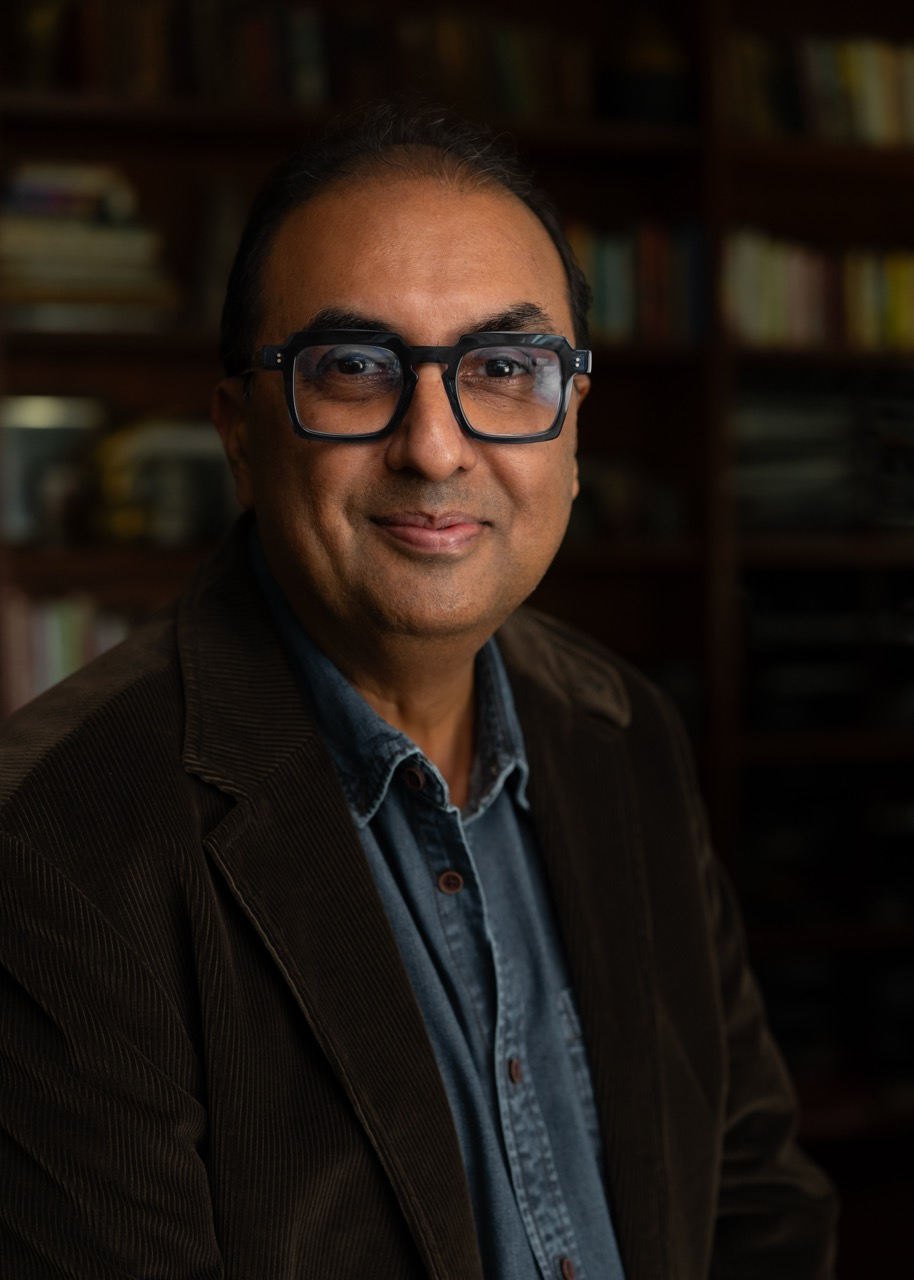
- Born: 25 August 1969 (age 57); Patna, Bihar, India
- Education: The Doon School; St. Stephen's College, Delhi; Film and Television Institute of India
- Occupations: Filmmaker; conservator-restorer; archivist
- Years active: 1993–present
- Known for: Celluloid Man; The Immortals; CzechMate: In Search of Jiří Menzel
- Spouse(s): Teesha Cherian (writer/director, Film Heritage Foundation)
- Awards: National Film Award for Best Biographical Film (2012); National Film Award for Best Historical Reconstruction/Compilation Film (2012)

Shivendra Singh Dungarpur (born 25 August 1969) is an Indian filmmaker, producer, film archivist and restorer. He is best known for his films Celluloid Man, The Immortals and CzechMate: In Search of Jiří Menzel. He has also directed several award-winning commercials and public service campaigns under the banner of Dungarpur Films.

Dungarpur is the founder Director of Film Heritage Foundation, a non-profit organization dedicated to the preservation and restoration of India's film heritage.

Shivendra Singh Dungarpur is the newly appointed Director of the Mumbai Academy of the Moving Image (MAMI) Mumbai Film Festival.

He has been elected four times to the executive committee of the International Federation of Film Archives (FIAF) at the elections held at the FIAF Congress 2017 in Los Angeles, FIAF Congress 2019 in Lausanne and the online FIAF Congress in 2021.

In 2023, Dungarpur became a member of the Advisory Council of the India International Centre, New Delhi.

Shivendra Singh Dungarpur has been selected as an international Jury Member for the 76th Berlin International Film Festival.

Shivendra Singh Dungarpur has been invited to serve on the Official Feature Films Jury at the 25th Las Palmas de Gran Canaria International Film Festival 2026, joining a distinguished panel of international filmmakers and cultural voices. The jury is entrusted with viewing and evaluating the films in competition, ultimately selecting and awarding the most outstanding works of the festival.

== Education and early life ==
Dungarpur was born in Patna, Bihar and belongs to the erstwhile royal family of Dungarpur State that still has its family seat in Dungarpur, Rajasthan and is the nephew of Raj Singh Dungarpur.

He attended The Doon School, graduating in 1987. He went on to do a degree in history (Hons) from St. Stephen's College, Delhi and shifted to Mumbai soon after to begin his career in film as an assistant director to writer-lyricist and director, Gulzar and worked with him on films like Lekin and Libaas. Subsequently, he enrolled in the Film and Television Institute of India, Pune to study film direction and scriptwriting. He graduated from FTII in 1994.

He was first introduced to the cinema by his maternal grandmother, Usha Rani, Maharani of Dumraon. It was with her and his grandfather Maharaj Kamal Singh of Dumraon that he first saw classics ranging from Pakeezah to Chaplin, Buster Keaton, Laurel & Hardy and Danny Kaye at summer evening screenings on 16 mm and 8 mm projectors in the verandah of their home in Dumraon.

== Career ==
Shivendra Singh Dungarpur started his production house Dungarpur Films in 2001. Under this banner, he has directed and produced commercials and documentaries for numerous brands over the years.

In 2014, he founded Film Heritage Foundation to preserve India's endangered film heritage. Film Heritage Foundation is a non-profit organization based in Mumbai which is dedicated to supporting the conservation, preservation and restoration of the moving image and to developing interdisciplinary programs to create awareness about the language of cinema.

In 2021, Shivendra Singh Dungarpur joined the Board of Trustees of the Mumbai Academy of the Moving Image. In 2024, he became the Festival Director of the MAMI Mumbai Film Festival.

He is a supporting member of the Fondazione Cineteca di Bologna, Italy, along with the legendary Pathé film company. He is a member of the Artistic Committee of the Il Cinema Ritrovato Festival in Bologna and also a member of the Honorary Committee of the Nitrate Picture Show, George Eastman House's Festival of Film Conservation. Dungarpur was a member of the Expert Committee of the National Museum of Indian Cinema.

== Filmography ==
Shivendra Singh Dungarpur directed his first documentary in 2012, called Celluloid Man, which won the National Film Award for Best Biographical Film and National Film Award for Best Historical Reconstruction/Compilation Film. The filming of the documentary began in 2010 and it was completed in May 2012. The film premiered at the Il Cinema Ritrovato Festival in Bologna, Italy, on 26 June 2012. It was the opening film at the Sierra Leone International Film Festival, 2013, and the Kyiv International Documentary Film Festival, 2013 where it won the "Nestor The Chronicler" award for the best archival film. In 2018, Dungarpur was invited by the Academy of Motion Picture Arts and Sciences to speak about his efforts in preserving India's cinematic heritage, which was followed by a screening of his documentary Celluloid Man.

Dungarpur's second documentary, The Immortals was completed in August 2015 and premiered at the 20th Busan International Film Festival in October. This film is a personal journey, travelling through time and space to unravel hidden stories and rediscover objects and images that at one time were an integral part of the lives of these artists through which their creations came into being. The film was screened at the 17th Jio MAMI Mumbai Film Festival and was the opening film in the Documentary Section at the 21st Kolkata International Film Festival. The Immortals won the Special Jury Award in the National Competition Section of the Mumbai International Film Festival (MIFF) for Documentaries, Short and Animation Films in 2016. and was screened at the 30th edition of the Il Cinema Ritrovato festival in Bologna in the same year.

In 2018, Dungarpur released the 420-minute documentary CzechMate: In Search of Jiří Menzel, based on the life of Czech film and theatre director, screenwriter, and actor, Jiří Menzel. The seven-hour-long film was eight years in the making and features extensive interviews with 85 filmmakers, actors and film historians including Woody Allen, Ken Loach, and Emir Kusturica. The film had its debut at a screening at the UCLA Film & Television Archive in September 2018 and has also been screened at the 20th Jio MAMI Mumbai Film Festival. The film has been showcased at the 24th Kolkata International Film Festival in November 2018, the Il Cinema Ritrovato in Bologna, and screenings in Prague, Slovakia and London. The British Film Institute and Sight & Sound The International Film Magazine polled "CzechMate – In Search of Jiri Menzel" in the top 5 Blu-Ray and DVD releases of 2020 in a vote by eminent film critics.

| Year | Film | Notes |
|---|---|---|
| 2012 | Celluloid Man | Documentary |
| 2015 | The Immortals | Documentary |
| 2018 | CzechMate: In Search of Jiří Menzel | Documentary |

== Acting ==
Shivendra acted in the film “Knock on the Door” directed by Ranjan Palit along with a cast of actors that included Naseeruddin Shah, Adil Hussain, Nandita Das, Ratna Pathak Shah and Amrita Chattopadhyay. The film was selected for the International Film Festival of Rotterdam (IFFR) in 2023.

In 2022, he was offered a role in the Hindi film "Ghoomer" directed by R. Balki where he plays a prominent role along with a cast comprising Shabana Azmi, Saiyami Kher, and Abhishek Bachchan.

== Short films and television ==
Shivendra directed a 26-episode series Rahe Na Rahe Hum produced by Contiloe Films for Star TV and hosted by scriptwriter and lyricist Javed Akhtar. He also produced a five-episode serial for Doordarshan based on the classic novel Bhoole Bisre Chitra written by Shri Bhagwati Charan Verma. Dungarpur Films has produced two short films I became... and Room 19. I became... was given a gold medal at the IDPA Awards 2006 for the Best Short Fiction film of the year. It also won the award for the Best Short Film at the Marbella Film Festival in 2007 and was shortlisted for the Kathmandu Film Festival 2008.

== Curation ==
For the first time in the history of Indian cinema, the Academy Museum of Motion Pictures in Los Angeles presented a curated selection of 12 iconic films from Indi - Emotion in Colour: A Kaleidoscope of Indian Cinema - which was curated by Shivendra Singh Dungarpur and ran from March 7 to April 19, 2025.

== Awards ==
- In June 2025, Dungarpur was honored with the esteemed Vittorio Boarini Award for Film preservation.
- 2016 – Special Jury Award for "The Immortals" in the National Competition Section of the 14th Mumbai International Film Festival (MIFF)
- 2014 – Special Jury Award for Celluloid Man at the 13th edition of the Mumbai International Film Festival (MIFF)
- 2013 – His first feature-length documentary Film "Celluloid Man" (2012) has won two National Awards in India at the 60th National Film Award for Best Historical Reconstruction/Compilation Film and for Best Editing. He also won the "Nestor the Chronicler" award for the best archival film for Celluloid Man at the XII Kyiv International Documentary Film Festival
- 2013 – Bimal Roy Memorial Emerging Talent Award for "Celluloid Man"

Indian Documentary Producers' Association
| Year | Award | for |
|---|---|---|
| 2007 | gold | The best television commercial of the year for the VIP "Adjust" film |
| 2007 | silver | The television commercial category for the Havells "Rimpoche" film |
| 2007 | silver | The television commercial category for the Greenply "Court Case" film |
| 2006 | gold | The best television commercial of the year for the HSBC "Caterpillar" film |
| 2006 | silver | The television commercial category for the State Bank of India Life Insurance "Vase" film |
| 2005 | gold | The best television commercial of the year for the Times of India film |
| 2005 | gold | The best public service campaign for the Indian army in Kashmir |
| 2003 | gold | The best public service film for leprosy awareness |

== Film preservation and restoration ==
Shivendra was a donor for the British Film Institute's restoration of Alfred Hitchcock's silent film, The Lodger: A Story of the London Fog. In 2010, Dungarpur was approached by Martin Scorsese's organization World Cinema Project, which was interested in restoring the 1948 classic Kalpana directed by Uday Shankar. Shivendra facilitated the restoration of the film that was done by Martin Scorsese's World Cinema Foundation, that was premiered in the Cannes Film Festival Classic section in 2012. In 2013, he collaborated with the World Cinema Foundation again for the restoration of the 1972 Sinhalese film "Nidhanaya" directed by eminent Sri Lankan filmmaker Dr. Lester James Peries. The restored version of the film was premièred at the Venice International Film Festival, 2013.

In 2023, he joined the main jury of the 19th Play-Doc festival, an event with a strong focus on promotion of less-known nonfiction film heritage of Galicia.

== Film Heritage Foundation ==
In 2014, Film Heritage Foundation, a non-profit organization was founded by Shivendra Singh Dungarpur. The organization preserves India's cinematic heritage, and supports the conservation, preservation and restoration of the moving image and develops interdisciplinary educational programs that use film as an educational tool and create awareness about the language of cinema. This is the first non-governmental organization dedicated to the conservation of the moving image in India. Film Heritage Foundation was accepted as an associate member of FIAF (International Federation of Film Archives) at the General Assembly held in Sydney in April 2015.

Under the aegis of Shivendra Singh Dungarpur, Film Heritage Foundation's has restored/partnered for restoration with the following films that have had world premieres and screenings across renowned international film festivals – Kummatty (1979), Thamp (1978), Ishanou (1990), Manthan (1976), Ghatashraddha (1977), Maya Miriga (1984), Sholay (1975), Gehenu Lamai (1978), Aranyer Din Ratri (1970), Do Bigha Zamin (1953), In Which Annie Gives It Those Ones (1989).

The Government of India's postal agency, India Post, honored the Film legacy Foundation's efforts to save India's film legacy with the introduction of a postal Special Cover and cancellation stamp. On June 14, 2024, the postal Special Cover was unveiled in a ceremony held at the General Post Office in Mumbai. Notable writers, poets, lyricists, and filmmakers Gulzar and Shyam Benegal were there, along with the Chief Postmaster General of Maharashtra and the Postmaster General of Mumbai.

The Special Cover, which costs Rs. 5 and is available at the Mumbai General Post Office's Philately Bureau, features an illustration of Film Heritage Foundation conservators and Director Shivendra Singh Dungarpur saving celluloid films that are in danger of disappearing forever.

== Lumière Summit ==
On September 7, 2026 Shivendra Singh Dungarpur was invited by Mr. Emmanuel Macron, President of France, to the prestigious Lumière Summit in Saint-Paul-de-Vence, France. Convened under the theme “Forging New Alliances for Cinema and the Moving Image,” the first international summit dedicated to the future of cinema had brought together leading voices from across the global film and cultural landscape. Dungarpur participated in roundtable discussions with prominent cultural leaders on Saving the World’s Film Heritage and Rethinking Film Festivals as engines of discovery and circulation.

== Writing ==
Shivendra's essay "Magic of Celluloid" has been published in the book "From Darkness into Light – Perspectives on Film Preservation and Restoration" edited by Rajesh Devraj.

Shivendra Singh Dungarpur was among twenty film scholars, archivists and historians from different countries invited to contribute an essay to a landmark publication titled “Keeping Memories: Cinema and Archiving in Asia-Pacific” edited by Nick Deocampo and published by the Southeast Asia Pacific Audio-visual Archive Association (SEAPAVAA), Film Development Council of the Philippines, Vietnam Film Institute, through Ateneo University Press.

He has written for several publications and newspapers including IIC Quarterly Journal, The Telegraph, The Hindu and The Tribune.
