= Biju Toppo =

Indian documentary filmmaker

- Born: 20 January 1969 (age 57); Mahuadanr, Latehar district, Jharkhand, India
- Education: St. Xavier's College, Ranchi
- Occupations: Director, Producer, Video-Editor, Cinematographer
- Years active: 1990–present
- Notable work: Naachi Se Baanchi, Iron is Hot, The Hunt, Gadi Lohardaga Mail, Jharia, Kora Rajee
- Children: 3
- Honours: 59th National Film Awards & 65th National Film Awards

Biju Toppo is an anthropological and national award-winning tribal documentary filmmaker from Ranchi, Jharkhand. He uses film as a medium for social activism on behalf of marginalized indigenous communities, and teaches video production at St. Xaviers College, Ranchi, Jharkhand, India. He belongs to the ethnic group Kurukh of India.

== Introduction ==
Biju Toppo and Meghnath belong to AKHRA, a film production house working in the field of culture and communication in Jharkhand, India. Akhra is a pioneering group that has been making films on indigenous peoples' issues since 1995. Its many award-winning films have taken up burning issues relevant to indigenous people's survival in India. On 9 September 2011, the duo Meghnath and Biju Toppo were awarded the prestigious National Film Award by the President of India at a ceremony held at Vigyan Bhawan in New Delhi.

== Filmography ==
Year	Film	Director	Producer	Editor	Language	Notes
1996	Saheed Jo Anjan Rahe	Biju Toppo	AKHRA	Biju Toppo	Hindi	Saheed Jo Anjan Rahe (Unknown Martyrs), is a film about the brutal massacre of the indigenous persons on 19 April 1985, in which a former Member of Parliament named Fr. Anthony Murmu and fourteen others were killed in Banjhi, Sahebganj district of Jharkhand over a minor pond dispute at Banjhi. It is often termed as "Banjhi Massacre".
1997	Ek Hadsa Aur Bhee	Biju Toppo	AKHRA	Biju Toppo	Hindi	Ek Hadsa Aur Bhee (Yet Another Accident) is a film about a controversial dam incident in August 1997 which took place in Palamu district of Jharkhand. In order to silence the villagers’ protests against the construction of the Kutku-Mandal Dam, the temporary /sluice gate of the dam was shut. Thirty-two nearby villages were submerged overnight in the resulting floods, and approximately 1100 families were affected. Twenty-one people drowned, a large number of animals died and a lot of people’s property and goods were destroyed.
1998	Jaha Chinti Ladi Hathi Se (Where Ants are Fighting Elephants)					About indigenous peoples’ struggle against bauxite mining.
2000	Hamare Gaon Me Hamara Raj	Biju Toppo	Biju Toppo	Biju Toppo	Hindi	Hamare Gaon Me Hamara Raj (Tribal Self Rule) is a film on Panchayati Raj Extension in Scheduled Areas Act 1996. The film deals with the Grama Sabha movement.
2003	Vikas Bandook Ki Nal Se	Biju Toppo and Meghnath	AKHRA	Raja	Hindi	Vikas Bandook Ki Nal Se (Development Flows from the Barrel of the Guns) is a film which presents and examines orchestrated state violence against indigenous and local peoples when they rally and protest against development projects on their lands. Rather than focusing on a single instance, the filmmakers strengthen their thesis by recording examples from all over the country: Orissa, Jharkhand, Madhya Pradesh, Gujarat and Chhattisgarh. In each case, using the local police force, the state has brutalised and killed protestors, often on trumped-up charges of violence.
2004	From Kalinga to Kashipur					On the people’s struggle against an aluminium factory in Kashipur block of Koraput district in Orissa.
2005	Kora Rajee	Biju Toppo			Kurukh	Kora Rajee (The land of the diggers) is the first film in Kurukh, a tribal language. The film is on the issue of Adivasi labourers in the tea-garden communities of Assam and Bengal.
2007	Khorar desher joler kotha (Story of water from the land of drought)					On best practices of preservation and use of water in Purulia a drought-prone district of West-Bengal.
2007	Power for change					Is on use alternative development in rural Orissa especially on the use of Micro-Hydel power.
2009	100 Din Milega Kaam (100 days of work for you)					It is a film on the National Rural Employment Guarantee Act that promises to provide 100 days of work in the rural area and what is the ground reality.
2010	Loha Garam Hai (Iron is hot)	Biju Toppo and Meghnath	AKHRA	Biju Toppo	Hindi	It is on the issue of the sponge iron industry and its pollution and how people are trying to cope with it.
2010	Gadi Lohardaga Mail	Biju Toppo and Meghnath	AKHRA	B. Ajit	Hindi and Jharkhand folk songs	Nostalgic songs on the narrow gauge. Lohardaga passenger train which became history in January 2004.
2010	Ek Ropa Dhan					It is a film on the SRI method of rice cultivation, that explains how productivity can be increased by just changing the process of cultivation.
2010	Mukta Gyana Kutir					It is a film on alternative education for tribal girls who were dropout from regular schools. In the remote area of Orissa.
2011	Sona Gahi Pinjra	Biju Toppo			Kurukh	Sona Gahi Pinjra (The Golden Cage) is a film in Kurukh language which portrays about those people who desire to participate in their village festivals but are deprived because of their job. The film depicts how mobile phone becomes the living link in this situation.
2015	Taking Side	Biju Toppo and Meghnath	Forum of Religious	Biju Toppo and Deepak Bara	Hindi and English	For centuries people have laid down their life taking side with the oppressed. This film is the story of Sr. Valsa John. She was born in Kerala and worked for the Adivasi of Jharkhand. She leads the struggle against coal mining and laid down her life.
2015	Accumulated Injustice	Biju Toppo and Meghnath	AKHRA	Biju Toppo	Hindi	Adivasi people’s living condition on the dark side of Rourkela Steel Plant.
2015	The Hunt	Biju Toppo	Rajiv Mehrotra, Ridhima Mehra and Tulika Srivastava	Deepak Bara	English & Hindi	Today, our Government thinks Maoist is a major threat to internal security. They want to eliminate them from the red corridor as Maoist is a hindrance to secure the mineral resources of these areas for the corporate partners. Tribal who are fighting to save their ancestral land, are branded as Maoist. The Film ‘The Hunt’ explores the lives of the people sandwiched between Maoist and the State.
2017	Naachi Se Baanchi (Those who dance will survive)	Biju Toppo and Meghnath	Films Division of India	Amit Bahadur	Hindi	In his lifetime itself Dr Ram DayalMunda has become a symbol of indigenous cultural reawakening. Ram DayalMunda was the leading intellectual who has contributed to Jharkhand movement immensely. Dr Munda has represented Adivasi voices in RajyaShabha and United Nations. He has been awarded Sahitya Academy Award and Padmashree in 2009. He died in September 2011.
2018	Mundari Srishtikatha	Tuhin Paul	Meghnath	Rupesh	Hindi	Unlike us, our children have missed the opportunity to hear folklore from their elders. Folklore helps and give us dignity and self-esteem and is helpful in building our personality. This is AKHRA's humble effort to narrate the creation of myths. These stories were created thousands of years ago when is science was not as developed as it is today. So we must enjoy them, but always keep a scientific approach to life.
2018	Jharia (The Spring)	Biju Toppo	Public Service Broadcasting Trust	Rupesh Sahu	Hindi	It’s a film about an eighty-five-year-old man, Simon Oraon, The Water Man from Jharkhand who has been working relentlessly on water management and environmental protection in the villages of Jharkhand since he was fourteen.

== Awards ==
List of awards conferred on films made by Biju Toppo
Year	Awards	Awarding body	Film	Refs.
2004	Travelling Film Southasia (TFSA)	Travelling Film Southasia (TFSA)	Vikas Banook Ki Nal Se (Development Flows from the Barrel of the Guns)	
2005	Vatavaran Star Award for Best Documentary	CMS Vatavaran	Vikas Banook Ki Nal Se (Development Flows from the Barrel of the Guns)	
2006	Second Best Documentary Film / Video	Mumbai International Film Festival	Kora Rajee (The land of the diggers)	
2009	Best Environmental Film Award	Indian Documentary Producers’ Association (IDPA)	Loha Garam Hai (Iron is Hot)	
2010	58th National Film Awards	Directorate of Film Festivals	Loha Garam Hai (Iron is Hot)	
2010	Silver Medal	Indian Documentary Producers’ Association (IDPA)	Ek Ropa Dhan	
2010	58th National Film Awards	Directorate of Film Festivals	Ek Ropa Dhan	
2011	Best Short Film Award	International Folk Music Film Festival, Nepal	Gadi Lohardaga Mail	
2015	Special Jury Award	CMS Vatavaran Environment and Wildlife Film Festival	The Hunt	
2016	Best Documentary Award	International Documentary and Short Film Festival of Kerala	The Hunt	
2016	Best Documentary Award	International Film Festival of Shimla	The Hunt	
2016	Cinema of Resistance	SiGNS Festival, Kerala	The Hunt	
2017	Golden Bodhisattva Award	Bodhisattva International Film Festival in Patna	The Hunt	
2018	65th National Film Awards	Directorate of Film Festivals	Naachi se Baanchi	
2018	Jury Mention Award	Mumbai International Film Festival	Naachi se Baanchi	
2018	Special Jury Documentary	International Film Festival of Shimla	Naachi se Baanchi	
