= Celluloid Man =

- Directed by: Shivendra Singh Dungarpur
- Cinematography: Santosh Thundiyil; K. U. Mohanan; Abhik Mukhopadhyay; P. S. Vinod; H. M. Ramachandra; R. V. Ramani; Vikas Sivaraman; Mahesh Aney; Kiran Deohans; Ranjan Palit; V. Gopinath
- Edited by: Irene Dhar Malik
- Music by: Ram Sampath
- Production company: Dungarpur Films
- Release dates: 26 June 2012 (IL Cinema Ritrovato); 3 May 2013 (India)
- Running time: 150 min
- Country: India
- Languages: English; Hindi; Kannada; Bengali

Celluloid Man is a 2012 documentary film directed by Shivendra Singh Dungarpur that explores the life and work of legendary Indian archivist P. K. Nair, founder of the National Film Archive of India and guardian of Indian cinema.

Celluloid Man has been screened at 50 film festivals – one of the few Indian films to have been selected for such a high number of festivals. The film has won two National Awards at the 60th National Film Awards, including Best Biographical Film and Best Editing for Irene Dhar Malik. The film was released in India on 3 May 2013 to coincide with the centenary of Indian cinema.

== Synopsis ==
P. K. Nair's fascination with cinema began as a child and he watched his first few films lying on the white sand floor of a cinema in Trivandrum. He was a collector even then - collecting ticket stubs, lobby cards, even weighing machine tickets sporting pictures of the stars of the day. He grew up to be a great collector of films.

1,700 films were made in India during the silent film era, of which only nine survive thanks to the efforts of Nair. He travelled to remote parts of India to collect and save cans of rare films. The fact that Dadasaheb Phalke is recognized today as the father of Indian cinema is Nair's doing. He tried to save any film that he could get his hands on, be it world cinema, Hindi popular films or regional Indian cinema. He even took world cinema to the villages of India.

He has influenced generations of Indian film students especially the Indian New Wave filmmakers such as Mani Kaul, Kumar Shahani, Adoor Gopalakrishnan, Ketan Mehta, Saeed Akhtar Mirza, Jahnu Barua, Girish Kasaravalli, John Abraham (director), Vidhu Vinod Chopra and Kundan Shah.

The film is woven with interviews of several filmmakers and film personalities who have been influenced directly and indirectly by P. K. Nair, among them Krzysztof Zanussi, Lester James Peries, Vidhu Vinod Chopra, Saeed Akhtar Mirza, Gulzar, Basu Chatterjee, Naseeruddin Shah, Kamal Haasan, Girish Kasaravalli, Jahnu Barua, Jaya Bachchan, Dilip Kumar, Saira Banu, Sitara Devi, Santosh Sivan, Rajkumar Hirani, Shyam Benegal, Mahesh Bhatt, Yash Chopra, Ramesh Sippy, Mrinal Sen and Surama Ghatak.

Besides the interviews, the film has rare footage from early Indian masterpieces like Raja Harishchandra, Kaliya Mardan, Gallant Hearts, Marthanda Verma, Jamai Babu, Fearless Nadia, Sant Tukaram, Achut Kanya, Kismat, Chandralekha and Kalpana - all films that were archived and thus saved by Nair.

== Production ==
The production started at the end of 2010 and the film was completed in June 2012.

The film has been shot in Warsaw, Colombo, Pune, Nasik, Mumbai, Chennai, Thiruvananthapuram, Heggodu, Bengaluru and Kolkata, and eleven cinematographers worked on it: Santosh Thundiyil, K. U. Mohanan, Abhik Mukhopadhyay, P. S. Vinod, H. M. Ramachandra, R. V. Ramani, Vikas Sivaraman, Mahesh Aney and Kiran Deohans.

The film was shot on 16mm film and then converted to 35mm, with an aspect ratio of 1.85: 1.

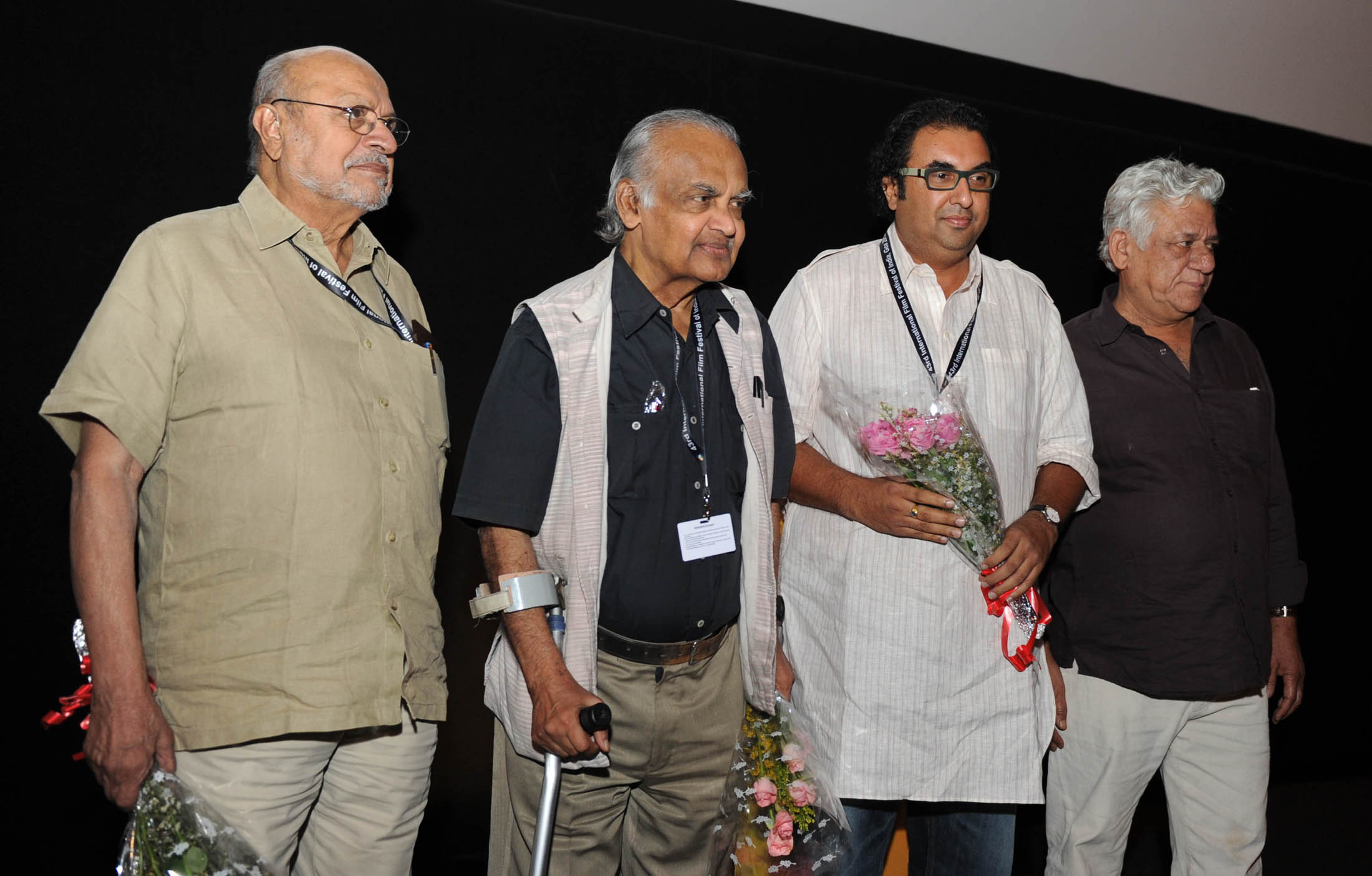
Director Shivendra Singh (second from left), at IFFI (2012)

== Awards ==
Celluloid Man has won two National Awards in India at the 60th National Film Awards for the Best Historical / Biographical Reconstruction and for Best Editing in 2013. It has also won the "Nestor The Chronicler" award for the best archival film for Celluloid Man at the XII Kyiv International Documentary Film Festival 2013, Ukraine.

Shivendra Singh was given the Bimal Roy Memorial Emerging Talent Award for his film Celluloid Man at a ceremony on 18 October 2013

Shivendra Singh Dungarpur was awarded the Special Jury Award for Celluloid Man at the 13th edition of the Mumbai International Film Festival (MIFF) 2014 on 9 February 2014.

== Festivals ==
FILM FESTIVAL LIST
No	Film Festival Name	Place	Screening Date
1	IL Cinema Ritrovato 2012	Bologna	25–26 June 2012
2	39th Telluride Film Festival	Telluride	1 September 2012
3	50th New York Film Festival	New York	4 October 2012
4	14th Mumbai Film Festival	Mumbai	22 October 2012
5	43rd International Film Festival of India	Goa	21 & 27 November 2012
6	17th International Film Festival of Kerala	Trivandrum	12 & 14 December 2012
7	42nd International Film Festival Rotterdam	Rotterdam	28 & 31 January 2013
8	36th Goteborg International Film Festival	Goteborg	26–29 January 2013
9	37th The Hong Kong International Film Festival	Kowloon	24 March & 2 April 2013
10	2nd Sierra Leone International Film Festival	Sierra Leone	13 April 2013
11	1st Scarborough Film Festival	Toronto	8 June 2013
12	XII Kyiv International Documentary Film Festival	Kyiv	21 May 2013
13	Seattle International Film Festival	Seattle	30 May & 1 April 2013
14	16th Shanghai International Film Festival	Shanghai	15 June 2013
15	2nd International Film Festival of Fiji	Suva Fiji	12–26 July 2013
16	Vladivostok International Film Festival	Vladivostok	10 September 2013
17	Film South Asia 2013	Kathmandu	3–6 October 2013
