= Il Cinema Ritrovato =

Italian cinema history festival

- Logo
- Location: Bologna, Italy
- Founded: 1986
- Hosted by: Cineteca di Bologna
- Language: International
- Website: https://festival.ilcinemaritrovato.it/

Il Cinema Ritrovato (lit. 'Cinema Rediscovered') is an annual film festival organized by the Cineteca di Bologna dedicated to the history of cinema, screening film classics and retrospectives, and showcasing the latest restored works from cinematographic archives and film laboratories around the world. It is widely regarded as one of the leading international events devoted to cinematic heritage.

== History ==
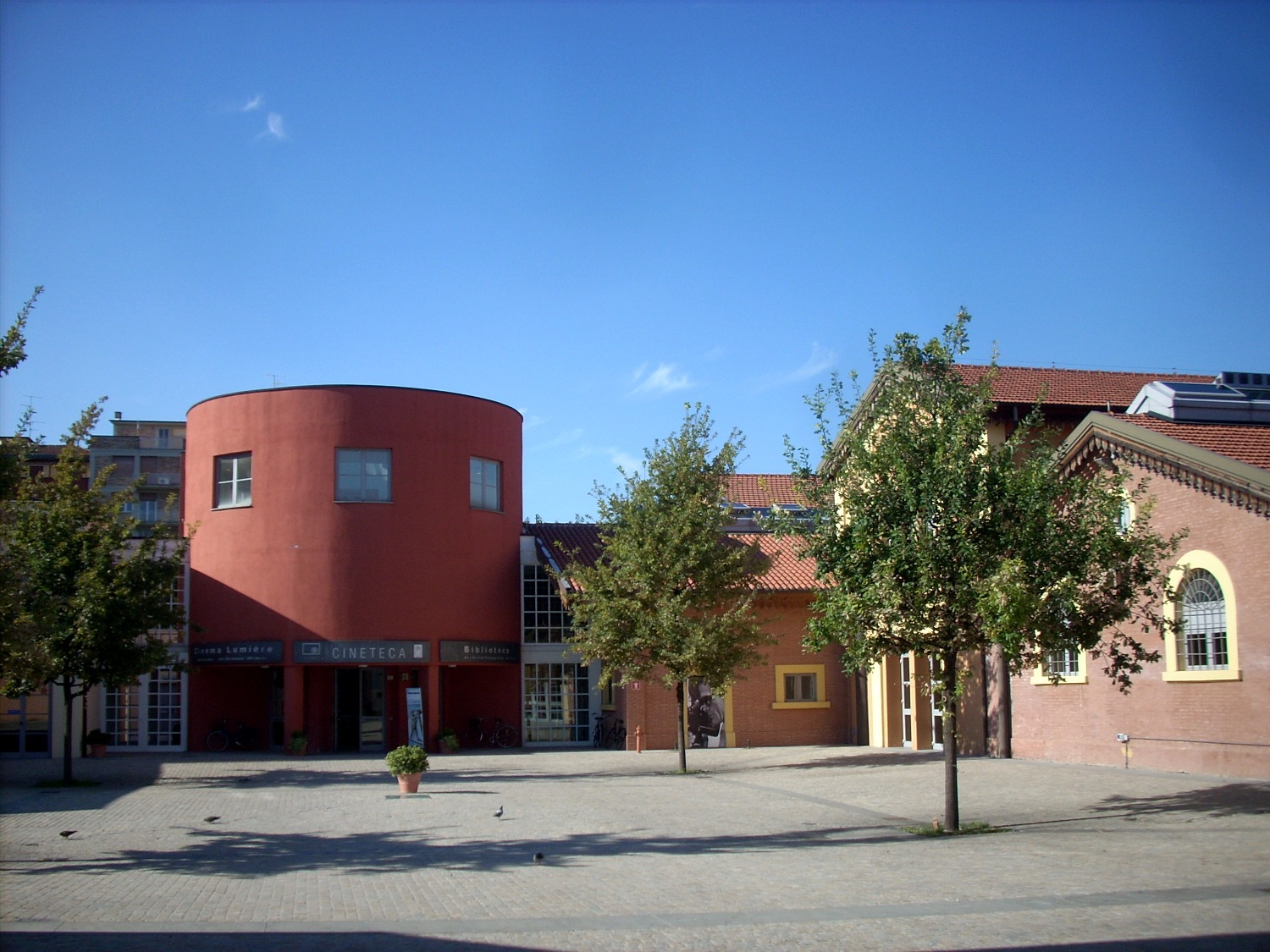
Piazzetta Pier Paolo Pasolini, the festival's headquarters

The festival began in 1986 as a five-day symposium on film conservation organized by the Cineteca di Bologna, conceived by Gian Luca Farinelli, who has guided it since its earliest days and became director of the Cineteca in 2000. It grew out of the Mostra internazionale del cinema libero, a festival founded at Porretta Terme in 1960 by Bruno Grieco, Gian Paolo Testa, Leonida Repaci and Cesare Zavattini to show films outside conventional distribution, which ran until 1985.

For its first decade the audience was around 90 percent foreign, made up largely of academics and archive professionals. Attendance grew markedly after 2011, as the digitization of archives broadened interest in restored cinema. By 2024 the festival recorded 130,000 admissions, with accredited attendees from 72 countries; among events devoted to classic cinema, only the Lumière Festival in Lyon, launched in 2009, draws comparable numbers.

The Finnish critic and historian Peter von Bagh was artistic director from 2001 until his death in 2014. The festival is now led by four co-directors: Farinelli, Cecilia Cenciarelli, Ehsan Khoshbakht and Mariann Lewinsky.

== Format and programming ==
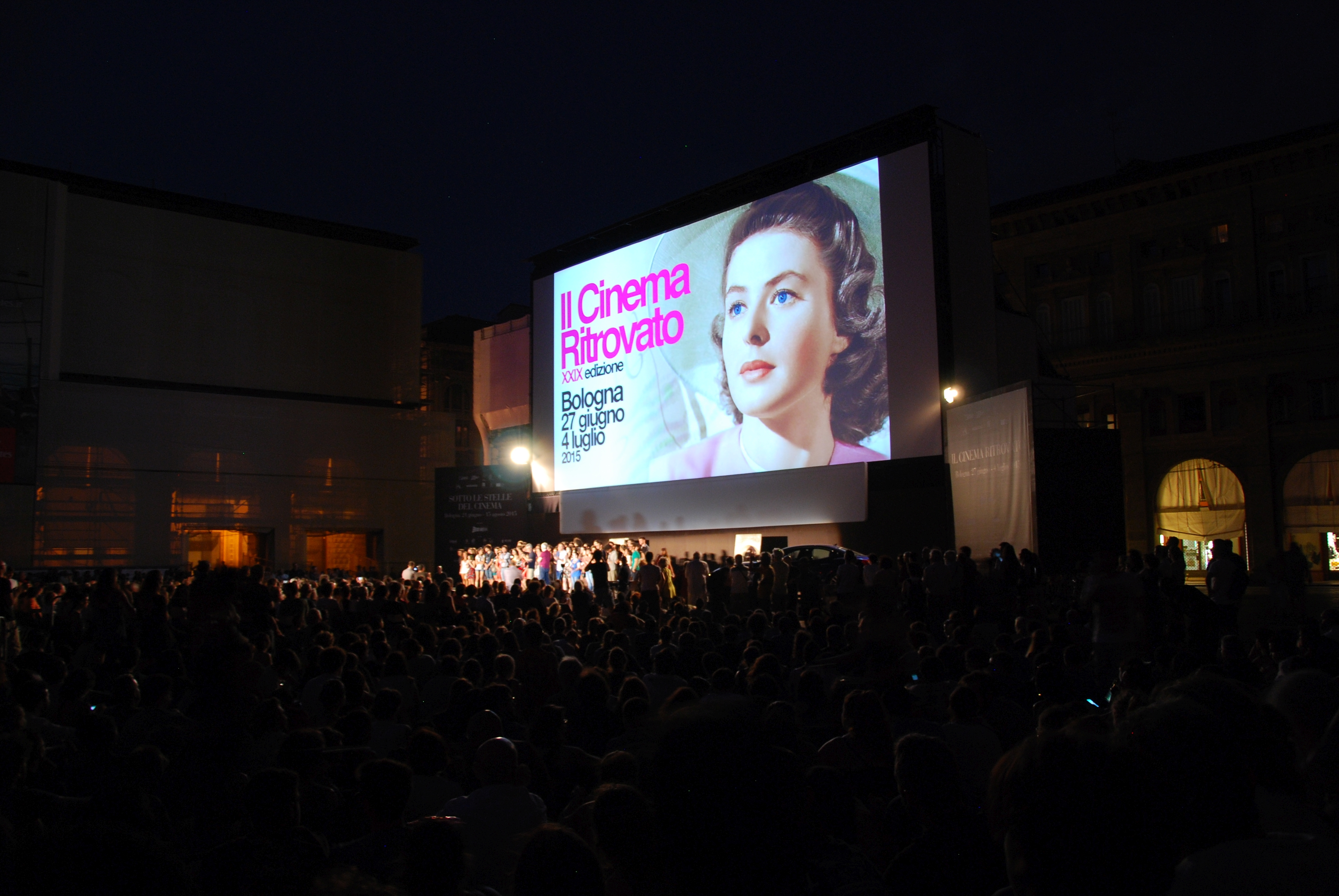
An open-air screening in Piazza Maggiore during the 2015 edition

The festival runs for nine days in late June, using eight cinemas in the historic center of Bologna together with open-air venues at Piazza Maggiore, Piazzetta Pasolini and the Arena Puccini, and screens close to 500 films. Evening screenings in Piazza Maggiore are projected onto a ten-meter screen and are free to the public, while the indoor program is accessible only by festival pass, priced at €140 in 2025.

The majority of the films shown date from the early days of cinematography to the 1960s. Recurring strands include Ritrovati e Restaurati (Rediscovered and Restored), Cinemalibero, Documenti e documentari, a section devoted to films released exactly a hundred years earlier, and Cinema Ritrovato Kids & Young, alongside annual retrospectives on directors and performers. The festival is also a major showcase for silent film, with live accompaniment by established and emerging silent-film musicians.

Guests have included Martin Scorsese, Wim Wenders, Wes Anderson, Alexander Payne, Damien Chazelle and Thierry Frémaux; Jean-Luc Godard attended in 2011. Programming partners include the Criterion Channel, Scorsese's World Cinema Project and the major American studios.

== Awards ==
Since 2004 the festival has presented the Il Cinema Ritrovato DVD Awards, which recognize home-video editions of films made at least thirty years earlier. The awards are given in five categories, the principal one being Best DVD/Blu-ray, named the Peter von Bagh Award.

== Distribution ==
In 2013 the festival launched a theatrical distribution arm, Il Cinema Ritrovato. Al Cinema, which has released close to a hundred restored classics to a network of around 50 cinemas across Italy, licensing titles through studios and specialists such as Park Circus and distributing in partnership with Italian companies including BIM, iWonder and Lucky Red.
