= 57th National Film Awards =

Indian ceremony celebrating cinema of 2009

- 57th National Film Awards
- Awarded for: Best of Indian cinema in 2009
- Awarded by: Directorate of Film Festivals
- Presented by: Pratibha Patil (President of India)
- Announced on: 15 September 2010
- Presented on: 22 October 2010
- Site: Vigyan Bhawan, New Delhi
- Official website: dff.nic.in

Highlights
- Best Feature Film: Kutty Srank
- Best Non-Feature Film: The Postman and Bilal
- Best Book: Cinemaa Yaana
- Best Film Critic: C. S. Venkiteswaran
- Dadasaheb Phalke Award: D. Ramanaidu
- Most awards: Kutty Srank (5)

The 57th National Film Awards, presented by Directorate of Film Festivals, the organisation set up by Ministry of Information and Broadcasting, India to felicitate the best of Indian Cinema released in the year 2009.

Three different committees were instituted in order to judge the various entries for feature film, non-feature film and best writing on cinema sections; headed by National award winner director, Ramesh Sippy, for feature films and Mike Pandey along with Samik Bandyopadhyay for non-feature films and best writing on cinema sections, respectively. Another committee of five members was also constituted for the Dadasaheb Phalke Award.

Each chairperson for feature film, non-feature film and best writing on cinema sections announced the award on 15 September 2010 for their respective sections and award ceremony took place at Vigyan Bhavan, New Delhi with President of India, Pratibha Patil giving away the awards on 22 October 2010.

Dadasaheb Phalke award for D. Ramanaidu was announced prior to the announcement of 57th National Film Awards on 9 September 2010.

With 57th National Film Awards, for feature film section, National Film Award for Best Screenplay, Best Audiography and Best Music Direction have been split into multiple awards to felicitate different aspect of the techniques. Best Screenplay would now cover Original and Adapted Screenplay along with Dialogues. National Film Award for Best Audiography have been sub-categorized into Location sound recordist, Sound designer and Re-recordist of the final mixed track; whereas Best Music Direction will be given for Songs and Background score, separately. All the awardee will be awarded with Rajat Kamal (Silver Lotus).

== Awards ==
Awards were divided into feature films, non-feature films and books written on Indian cinema.

=== Lifetime Achievement Award ===
Lifetime achievement award is given to the prominent personality from the Indian film industry for the significant contributions given.

==== Juries ====
A committee consisting five eminent personalities from Indian film industry was appointed to evaluate the lifetime achievement award, Dadasaheb Phalke Award. Following were the jury members:

- Jury Members
  - Yash Chopra • Akkineni Nageswara Rao • Javed Akhtar • Jagjit Singh • Asha Parekh

Name of Award	Image	Awardee(s)	Awarded As	Awards
Dadasaheb Phalke Award		D. Ramanaidu	Producer	Swarna Kamal, ₹ 1,000,000 and a Shawl

=== Feature films ===
Films made in any Indian language shot on 16 mm, 35 mm or in a wider gauge or digital format but released on a film format or video/digital but certified by the Central Board of Film Certification as a feature film or featurette are eligible for Feature Film section.

A total of 20 films were awarded in this category at the National Awards. Feature films were awarded at All India as well as regional level. For 57th National Film Awards, a Malayalam film, Kutty Srank won the National Film Award for Best Feature Film also winning the maximum number of awards (5). Following were the awards given in each category:

==== Juries ====
A committee headed by Ramesh Sippy was appointed to evaluate the feature films awards. The selection process returned to a Two Tier System of Selection. The Chairperson for the Northern Region was Sushma Seth, for the Western Region, M. S. Sathyu, for South–I Region, T. S. Nagabharana, for the Eastern Region, B. Lenin and for South- II Region, Pinaki Chaudhari. Following were the jury members:

- Jury Members
  - Ramesh Sippy (Chairperson) • M. S. Sathyu • T. S. Nagabharana • Pinaki Chaudhuri • B. Lenin
  - Sushma Seth • Bhanu Athaiya • Maithili Rao • Hari Kumar • Feroz Abbas Khan • Sarosh Italiaa
- Jury Regional : North
  - Sushma Seth • Birendra Nath Tiwari • Rama Vij • Saryu V. Doshi • Apurwa Yagnik
- Jury Regional : West
  - M. S. Sathyu • Ramdas Phutane • Ranjeet • Kuldip Sud • Fowzia Fathima
- Jury Regional : South-I (Tamil and Malayalam)
  - T. S. Nagabharana • Agathiyan • R. Sarath • Sanjeev Sivan • Prem Sagar
- Jury Regional : South-II (Kannada and Telugu)
  - Pinaki Chaudhuri • Chandrasiddarth • V. N. Laxminarayana • Suresh Krishna • Prabodh Parikh
- Jury Regional : East
  - B. Lenin • Makhonmani Mongsaba • Aniruddha Roy Chowdhury • Vidya Rao Nair • Jeroo Mulla

==== All India Award ====
Following were the awards given:

===== Golden Lotus Award =====
Official Name: Swarna Kamal

All the awardees are awarded with 'Golden Lotus Award (Swarna Kamal)', a certificate and cash prize.

Name of Award	Name of Film	Language	Awardee(s)	Cash prize
Best Feature Film	Kutty Srank	Malayalam	Producer: Reliance Big Pictures; Director: Shaji N. Karun	₹ 2,50,000/- Each
Best Feature Film	Citation: For its vision and cinematic craft that express the different perspectives of three women about the truth of the man in their lives.			
Best Debut Film of A Director	Lahore	Hindi	Producer: Vivek Khatkar; Director: Sanjay Puran Singh Chauhan	₹ 1,25,000/- Each
Best Debut Film of A Director	Citation: For excellent control over the medium and using sport as a metaphor to tell a compelling story.			
Best Popular Film Providing Wholesome Entertainment	3 Idiots	Hindi	Producer: Vidhu Vinod Chopra; Director: Rajkumar Hirani	₹ 2,00,000/- Each
Best Popular Film Providing Wholesome Entertainment	Citation: For an intelligent entertainer that touches upon the contemporary concerns of society with great humour and engaging performances.			
Best Children's Film	Putaani Party	Kannada	Producer: Children's Film Society; Director: Ramchandra P. N.	₹ 37,500/- Each
Best Children's Film	Citation: For the novel idea of empowering children to work as a Panchayat to combat alcoholism that destroys their future.			₹ 37,500/- Each
Best Children's Film	Keshu	Malayalam	Producer: Children's Film Society, India; Director: Sivan	₹ 37,500/- Each
Best Children's Film	Citation: For the sensitivity that explores the lonely world of a specially abled child and the inability of adults to recognise the genius in him.			₹ 37,500/- Each
Best Direction	Abohomaan	Bengali	Rituparno Ghosh	₹ 2,50,000/-
Best Direction	Citation: For the many layered narrative of emotional conflict, rich texture and ensemble performances.			

===== Silver Lotus Award =====
Official Name: Rajat Kamal

All the awardees are awarded with 'Silver Lotus Award (Rajat Kamal)', a certificate and cash prize.

Name of Award	Name of Film	Language	Awardee(s)	Cash prize
Best Feature Film on National Integration	Delhi-6	Hindi	Producer: Rakeysh Omprakash Mehra; Director: Rakeysh Omprakash Mehra	₹ 1,50,000/- Each
Best Feature Film on National Integration	Citation: For its uncompromising stance towards communal divide and offering a humanistic solution of taking individual responsibility.			
Best Film on Other Social Issues	Well Done Abba	Hindi	Producer: Reliance Big Pictures; Director: Shyam Benegal	₹ 1,50,000/- Each
Best Film on Other Social Issues	Citation: For a socio-political satire about a common man's fight for justice against an all pervasive corrupt system.			
Best Actor	Paa	Hindi	Amitabh Bachchan	₹ 50,000/-
Best Actor	Citation: For a rare performance that fuses the art and craft of an actor to create a character that lives with you long after the film is over.			
Best Actress	Abohomaan	Bengali	Anannya Chatterjee	₹ 50,000/-
Best Actress	Citation: For the exquisite detailing of a complex character through different stages of the professional and personal life of an actress.			
Best Supporting Actor	Lahore	Hindi	Farooq Sheikh	₹ 50,000/-
Best Supporting Actor	Citation: For the consummate ease with which he persuades and inspires everyone around him while retaining his integrity and dignity.			
Best Supporting Actress	Paa	Hindi	Arundathi Nag	₹ 50,000/-
Best Supporting Actress	Citation: For the restraint with which she conveys strength, compassion and understanding to her daughter, a single mother, bringing up a son stricken with a rare degenerative disease.			
Best Child Artist	Pasanga	Tamil	• Sree Raam • Kishore	₹ 50,000/-
Best Child Artist	Citation: For the spirited performance of a protagonist and an antagonist who are incomplete without each other. The two young shoulders carry the narrative through a delightful journey.			
Best Male Playback Singer	Mahanagar@Kolkata (For the song "Ei To Ami")	Bengali	Rupam Islam	₹ 50,000/-
Best Male Playback Singer	Citation: For the deeply felt emotional resonance and a haunting lilt that evokes the thematic ambience of the film.			
Best Female Playback Singer	Houseful ( For the song "Boe Jay Shudhu Bish")	Bengali	Nilanjana Sarkar	₹ 50,000/-
Best Female Playback Singer	Citation: For the haunting texture of a voice that blends the melody, words and rhythm.			
Best Cinematography	Kutty Srank	Malayalam	Cameraman: Anjuli Shukla; Laboratory Processing: Adlabs Films Ltd.	₹ 50,000/- Each
Best Cinematography	Citation: For the breathtaking sweep that captures the magical mystery of a multilayered narrative.			
Best Screenplay • Screenplay Writer (Original)	Kutty Srank	Malayalam	• P. F. Mathews • Harikrishna	₹ 25,000/- Each
Best Screenplay • Screenplay Writer (Original)	Citation: For the mysterious narrative that weaves together multiple perspectives to create a coherent whole, and yet leaves a haunting ambiguity.			
Best Screenplay • Screenplay Writer (Adapted)	Kanasemba Kudureyaneri	Kannada	• Gopal Krishan Pai • Girish Kasaravalli	₹ 25,000/- Each
Best Screenplay • Screenplay Writer (Adapted)	Citation: For linking the theme of death and its inevitability through a narrative style that presents two versions of the same event, not necessarily in chronological order.			
Best Screenplay • Dialogues	Pasanga	Tamil	Pandiraj	₹ 50,000/-
Best Screenplay • Dialogues	Citation: For the conversational quality with its cutting edge wit and life like freshness.			
Best Audiography • Location Sound Recordist	Kaminey	Hindi	Subash Sahoo	₹ 50,000/-
Best Audiography • Location Sound Recordist	Citation: For excellent live sound quality with the right tonal balance, capturing all the ambient sounds.			
Best Audiography • Sound Designer	Keralavarma Pazhassiraja	Malayalam	Resul Pookutty	₹ 50,000/-
Best Audiography • Sound Designer	Citation: For creating an outstanding aural landscape that transports you to a historical era.			
Best Audiography • Re-recordist of the Final Mixed Track	3 Idiots	Hindi	Anup Dev	₹ 50,000/-
Best Audiography • Re-recordist of the Final Mixed Track	Citation: For the fine amalgamation of different elements of sound to create the right ambience and perspective of the film image.			
Best Editing	Abohomaan	Bengali	Arghyakamal Mitra	₹ 50,000/-
Best Editing	Citation: For a very precise juxtaposition of time and space, allowing every frame to unravel the story with a keen sense of rhythm and pace.			
Best Art Direction	Delhi-6	Hindi	Samir Chanda	₹ 50,000/-
Best Art Direction	Citation: For a very convincing match of actual locations with detailed, recreated sets.			
Best Costume Design	Kutty Srank	Malayalam	Jayakumar	₹ 50,000/-
Best Costume Design	Citation: For capturing the essence of period and characters with the right blend of colour, style and texture.			
Best Make-up Artist	Paa	Hindi	• Christien Tinsley • Dominie Till	₹ 50,000/-
Best Make-up Artist	Citation: For authentic, detailed creation of a heart-warming character stricken by a fatal disease.			
Best Music Direction • Songs	Dev.D	Hindi	Amit Trivedi	₹ 50,000/-
Best Music Direction • Songs	Citation: For the innovative composition that blend contemporary and folk sounds.			
Best Music Direction • Background Score	Keralavarma Pazhassiraja	Malayalam	Ilaiyaraaja	₹ 50,000/-
Best Music Direction • Background Score	Citation: For creating epic grandeur by fusing symphonic orchestration with traditional Indian instrumentation.			
Best Lyrics	3 Idiots ("Behti Hawa Sa Tha Woh")	Hindi	Swanand Kirkire	₹ 50,000/-
Best Lyrics	Citation: For the simplicity and depth of feelings conveyed through evocative imagery.			
Best Special Effects	Magadheera	Telugu	R. C. Kamal Kannan	₹ 50,000/-
Best Special Effects	Citation: For the stunning use of special effects to enhance the visual sweeps of the fantastical story telling.			
Best Choreography	Magadheera	Telugu	K. Sivasankar	₹ 50,000/-
Best Choreography	Citation: For breath taking energy and innovation.			
Special Jury Award	• Kaminey • Keralavarma Pazhassiraja • Kutty Srank	• Hindi • Malayalam • Malayalam	A. Sreekar Prasad (Editor)	₹ 2,00,000/-
Special Jury Award	Citation: For his continued pursuance of excellence to the art and craft of editing, covering a range of themes and styles.			
Special Mention			Padmapriya (Actress)	Certificate Only
Special Mention	Citation: For the range and skill of an actor to portray varied characters in films of different languages.			

==== Regional Awards ====
The award is given to best film in the regional languages in India.

Name of Award	Name of Film	Awardee(s)	Cash prize
Best Feature Film in Assamese	Basundhara	Producer: Hiren Bora; Director: Hiren Bora	₹ 1,00,000/- Each
Best Feature Film in Assamese	Citation: For dealing with a pressing, contemporary ecological issue with sincerity.		
Best Feature Film in Bengali	Abohomaan	Producer: Reliance Big Pictures; Director: Rituparno Ghosh	₹ 1,00,000/- Each
Best Feature Film in Bengali	Citation: For sheer artistry that blends form and content of a provocative subject.		
Best Feature Film in Hindi	Paa	Producer: Amitabh Bachchan Corporation and Sunil Manchanda; Director: R. Balki	₹ 1,00,000/- Each
Best Feature Film in Hindi	Citation: For a heart rendering, yet unsentimental portrayal of a family dealing with a tragedy foretold.		
Best Feature Film in Kannada	Kanasemba Kudureyaneri	Producer: Basanta Kumar Patil; Director: Girish Kasaravalli	₹ 1,00,000/- Each
Best Feature Film in Kannada	Citation: For the departure from linear narrative to unfold the interlinked events in a village and its superstitions.		
Best Feature Film in Konkani	Paltadacho Munis	Producer: NFDC; Director: Laxmikant Shetgaonkar	₹ 1,00,000/- Each
Best Feature Film in Konkani	Citation: For the simplicity and humanism of dealing with a person the world calls insane.		
Best Feature Film in Malayalam	Keralavarma Pazhassiraja	Producer: Gokulam Gopalan; Director: T. Hariharan	₹ 1,00,000/- Each
Best Feature Film in Malayalam	Citation: For recreating the life and times of a forgotten and unsung hero who gave the first call of freedom from British rule.		
Best Feature Film in Marathi	Natarang	Producer: Zee Entertainment Enterprises Ltd. Director: Ravindra Harishchandra Jadhav	₹ 1,00,000/- Each
Best Feature Film in Marathi	Citation: For depicting the passion of an artiste, who despite social ostracism, political oppression and personal failures, pursues his dream.		
Best Feature Film in Tamil	Pasanga	Producer: M. Sasikumar; Director: Pandiraj	₹ 1,00,000/- Each
Best Feature Film in Tamil	Citation: For the unconventional, imaginative and energetic joyride of children that is delightful and uplifting.		

=== Non-Feature Films ===
Films made in any Indian language shot on 16 mm, 35 mm or in a wider gauge or digital format and released on either film format or video/digital but certified by the Central Board of Film Certification as a documentary/newsreel/fiction are eligible for non-feature film section.

A total of 11 films were awarded in the non-feature film category at the 57th National Film Awards. Gaarud and In Camera, both received the maximum number of awards, two.

==== Juries ====
A committee headed by Mike Pandey was appointed to evaluate the non-feature films awards. Following were the jury members:

- Jury Members
  - Mike Pandey (Chairperson) • M. R. Rajan • Joy Bimal Roy • Vibhu Puri • Rajesh Jala • Bani Prakash Das • Maya Jaideep

==== Golden Lotus Award ====
Official Name: Swarna Kamal

All the awardees are awarded with 'Golden Lotus Award (Swarna Kamal)', a certificate and cash prize.

Name of Award	Name of Film	Language	Awardee(s)	Cash prize
Best Non-Feature Film	The Postman	Tamil	Producer: K. Hariharan; Director: B. Manohar	₹ 37,500/- Each
Best Non-Feature Film	Citation: For a charming and heartwarming tale of a village postman caught in the web of changing times brought in by technology.			₹ 37,500/- Each
Best Non-Feature Film	Bilal	Bengali and Hindi	Producer: Sourav Sarangi; Director: Sourav Sarangi	₹ 37,500/- Each
Best Non-Feature Film	Citation: For showing effectively that disability is not an impedance to overcome the trials and tribulations of life.			₹ 37,500/- Each

==== Silver Lotus Award ====
Official Name: Rajat Kamal

All the awardees are awarded with 'Silver Lotus Award (Rajat Kamal)' and cash prize.

Name of Award	Name of Film	Language	Awardee(s)	Cash prize
Best First Non-Feature Film	Vaishnav Jan Toh	Hindi	Producer: Film and Television Institute of India; Director: Kaushal Oza	₹ 37,500/- Each
Best First Non-Feature Film	Citation: For sensitive handling of a thought provoking film that reflects the strength of nonviolence and Gandhian values – so relevant even today.			₹ 37,500/- Each
Best First Non-Feature Film	Ekti Kaktaliyo Golpo	Bengali	Producer: Film and Television Institute of India; Director: Tathagata Singha	₹ 37,500/- Each
Best First Non-Feature Film	Citation: For a promising debut showing imagination and flair to weave a tale of fantasy.			₹ 37,500/- Each
Best Biographical Film	Pancham Unmixed	Bengali, Hindi and English	Producer: Brahmanand S Siingh; Director: Brahmanand S Siingh	₹ 50,000/- Each
Best Biographical Film	Citation: For an engaging compilation of the tumultuous journey of a legendary and iconic music composer of the Indian Film Industry whose music lives on.			
Best Environment / Conservation / Preservation Film and Best Agricultural Film (Jointly given)	In For Motion	English	Producer: Amlan Dutta; Director: Anirban Dutta	₹ 50,000/- Each
Best Environment / Conservation / Preservation Film and Best Agricultural Film (Jointly given)	Citation: For portraying the changing scenario in the urban environment where burgeoning and mindless development is swallowing agricultural lands.			
Best Historical Reconstruction / Compilation Film	Pancham Unmixed	Bengali, Hindi and English	Producer: Brahmanand S Siingh; Director: Brahmanand S Siingh	₹ 50,000/- Each
Best Historical Reconstruction / Compilation Film	Citation: For an engaging compilation of the tumultuous journey of a legendary and iconic music composer of the Indian Film Industry whose music lives on.			
Best Film on Social Issues	Mr. India	Meitei	Producer: Haobam Paban Kumar; Director: Haobam Paban Kumar	₹ 50,000/- Each
Best Film on Social Issues	Citation: For bringing alive a motivational and touching story of indomitable human spirit and resilience. The struggle of an HIV patient who overcame all odds and barriers to win Mr. India title.			
Best Short Fiction Film	Boond	Hindi	Producer: Kumar Mangat; Director: Abhishek Pathak	₹ 50,000/- Each
Best Short Fiction Film	Citation: For "Wars will be fought for water" – a story of the future set in a village starved of water, food and love.			
Best Cinematography	Gaarud	Hindi and Marathi	Cameraman: Deepu S. Unni; Laboratory Processing: Adlabs Films Ltd.	₹ 50,000/- Each
Best Cinematography	Citation: For brilliant craftsmanship, intelligent lensing in aesthetically recreating the ambience and the diverse pulsating life in a semi-urban lodge.			
Best Audiography	Gaarud	Hindi and Marathi	Re-recordist of the Final Mixed Track: Lipika Singh Darai	₹ 50,000/-
Best Audiography	Citation: For imaginative use of ambient sounds in effectively creating diverse soundscapes.			
Best Editing	In Camera	English	Tarun Bhartiya	₹ 50,000/-
Best Editing	Citation: For being able to seamlessly juxtapose past and present experiences in the form of images.			
Best Narration / Voice Over	In Camera	English	Ranjan Palit	₹ 50,000/- Each
Best Narration / Voice Over	Citation: For his natural flow and engaging narration of a well-told story.			
Special Jury Award	Kelkkunnundo	Malayalam	Aasna Aslam (Child actor)	₹ 1,00,000/-
Special Jury Award	Citation: For her natural, sensitive and touching performance.			
Special Mention	Vilay	Silent film	Nikita Bhagat (Cinematographer)	Certificate Only
Special Mention	Citation: For her evocative and pathbreaking camerawork. The innovative use of shift focus brought, images, textures and emotions to life.			

=== Best Writing on Cinema ===
The awards aim at encouraging study and appreciation of cinema as an art form and dissemination of information and critical appreciation of this art-form through publication of books, articles, reviews etc.

==== Juries ====
A committee headed by Samik Bandyopadhyay was appointed to evaluate the writing on Indian cinema. Following were the jury members:

- Jury Members
  - Samik Bandyopadhyay (Chairperson) • R. K. Bidur Singh • Sharad Dutt

==== Golden Lotus Award ====
Official Name: Swarna Kamal

All the awardees are awarded with 'Golden Lotus Award (Swarna Kamal)' and cash prize.

Name of Award	Name of Book	Language	Awardee(s)	Cash prize
Best Book on Cinema	Cinemaa Yaana	Kannada	Author: K. Puttaswamy; Publisher: Hasiru Prakashana	₹ 75,000/- Each
Best Book on Cinema	Citation: For its probingly critical introduction to Kannada cinema in its interconnections with literature and theatre, history and society; with insightful analyses of the classics of Kannada cinema and assessments of individual contributions, often from beyond the borders of Karnataka; supplemented by excellent photographs and annotations; and extraordinary production values.			
Best Film Critic		Malayalam	C. S. Venkiteswaran	₹ 75,000/-
Best Film Critic	Citation: For his response to the multiplicity inherent in the cinematic form from an evolved consciousness of the medium and a historical sense of its overt/subliminal ideologies, articulated in a controlled and expressive prose where the insight allows him to remain nonjudgmental and suggestive.			

==== Special Mention ====
All the award winners are awarded with Certificate of Merit.

Name of Award	Name of Book	Language	Awardee(s)	Cash prize
Special Mention (Book on Cinema)	Eka Studioche Atmavrutta	Marathi	Prabhakar Pendharkar	Certificate Only
Special Mention (Book on Cinema)	Citation: For its unusual mode of documenting the history of one of the oldest Marathi studios.			

=== Awards not given ===
Following were the awards not given as no film was found to be suitable for the award:

- Best Animated Film
- Best Film on Family Welfare
- Best Film on Environment / Conservation / Preservation
- Best Feature Film in Manipuri (Meitei)
- Best Feature Film in Oriya
- Best Feature Film in Punjabi
- Best Feature Film in Telugu
- Best Feature Film in English
- Best Non-Feature Film Direction
- Best Anthropological / Ethnographic Film
- Best Arts / Cultural Film
- Best Scientific Film
- Best Promotional Film
- Best Educational / Motivational / Instructional Film
- Best Exploration / Adventure Film
- Best Investigative Film
- Best Animation Film
- Best Non-feature Film on Family Welfare
- Best Music Direction
