= Lohit =

Lohit may refer to:

- Lohita, an epithet of the Hindu deity Mangala
- Lohit River, in Arunachal Pradesh, India
- Lohit district, Arunachal Pradesh, India
- Lohit Frontier Division, a former division of the defunct North-East Frontier Agency (now Arunachal Pradesh) of India
- Lohit Express, a passenger train in India
- Lohit fonts, a font family covering Indic scripts
- Lohit Diary, a 2015 Indian film
- Lohit Sonowal, an Indian military personnel, recipient of the Kirti Chakra

== See also ==
- Kumkuma or lohita, vermilion used by women in India
- Lohitsya or Rohitashva, son of the legendary Indian king Harishchandra
- Lohithaswa (1942–2022), Indian film actor and playwright
- A. K. Lohithadas, Indian film director and screenwriter
