= Jhalki =

2019 Indian Hindi-language drama film

- Jhalki official poster
- Directed by: Brahmanand S. Singh; Tanvi Jain
- Screenplay by: Kamlesh Kunti Singh; Brahmanand S. Singh; Tanvi Jain
- Story by: Prakash Jha; Brahmanand S. Singh
- Produced by: Anand Chavan; Brahmanand S. Singh; Vinayak Gawande; Jayesh Parekh
- Starring: Boman Irani; Aarti Jha; Tannishtha Chatterjee; Divya Dutta; Sanjay Suri; Akhilendra Mishra; Joy Sengupta; Govind Namdev
- Cinematography: Rupesh Kumar
- Edited by: Suresh Pai
- Music by: Sandesh Shandilya
- Production companies: Mobius Films; OMG
- Distributed by: Panorama Studios
- Release date: 14 November 2019
- Country: India
- Language: Hindi

Jhalki (transl. Glimpse) is a 2019 Indian Hindi-language drama film directed by Brahmanand S. Singh and Tanvi Jain, written by Singh and Prakash Jha and produced by Singh (under Mobius Films), Anand Chavan (under OMG), Vinayak Gawande and Jayesh Parekh. The film is based on the life of Kailash Satyarthi, winner of the 2014 Nobel Peace Prize, and his efforts to fight child trafficking and child labour in India. It features Boman Irani as Satyarthi and Aarti Jha as the titular 9-year-old street girl Jhalki, setting out to find her 7-year-old brother amid child slavery. Tannishtha Chatterjee, Divya Dutta and Sanjay Suri star in supporting roles. The trailer of the film was released at the Cannes Film Festival in May 2019 and the film was released theatrically in India on 14 November 2019. It premiered at national and international film festivals and won various awards.

== Synopsis ==
A life-altering disappearance of her 7-year-old brother sets 9-year-old girl Jhalki off on a mission to find him at all costs. Armed with an intimate folktale and her own sharp mind, is Jhalki's journey the start of a spiral that will change the lives of thousands for good? What price must she pay to get what she wants?

== Cast ==
- Boman Irani as Kailash Satyarthi
- Aarti Jha as Jhalki
- Tannishtha Chatterjee as Priti Vyas
- Divya Dutta as Sunita Bhartiya
- Sanjay Suri as DM Sanjay Bhartiya
- Joy Sengupta as SDM Akhilesh
- Akhilendra Mishra as Shivlal Chakiya
- Govind Namdev as Ram Prasad
- Yatin Karyekar as Sipahi
- Bachan Pachehra as Rahim Chacha
- Vikram Singh as Lakhna
- Sanchita Goswami as Phullorani
- Goraksha Sakpal as Babu
- Sailesh Dubey as Mohan
- Kailash Satyarthi as himself (special appearance)

== Production ==
The film was shot in and around Mirzapur (Uttar Pradesh) and in Film City (Mumbai).

== Release and marketing ==
Jhalki was released nationwide (theatrically) by Panorama Studios on 14 November 2019 (Children's Day). It was marketed and promoted by The Kapil Sharma Show, ABP News and Kidzania.

Kailash Satyarthi Children's Foundation promoted the film wherein the film was screened for children, village communities, policy makers, chief ministers, judiciary, bureaucrats, MPs and MLAs, law enforcement agencies and national and state commissions for protection of child rights. Child Rights and You, Save The Children, Salaam Baalak Trust and UNICEF promoted and screened the film by running special campaigns. Van-mounted mobile theatres, by Picture Time and Mukti Caravan, were used to promote the film in rural areas.

== Reception ==
=== Box-office ===
The film earned approximately ₹1.96 crores at the box-office in its first week of release.

=== Reviews ===
The Times of India said that director Singh deals with a subject that is sensitive and socially alarming, while The Hindu found it to be a cinematic tribute to Satyarthi. Asian News International said that the film was meaningful yet with a "serious backdrop which are so entertaining, engaging and inspiring" and added that "Kailash Satyarthi's life-time of work of his crusade against human trafficking and child labour gets crystallized into one smooth story of conviction, courage and love. And what gets questioned in the process, is the inhuman practice of the people reaping benefit from the racket."

Film critic Bhawana Somaaya reviewed the film as "so human and it's so simple. I didn't even realize when and how often I cried in the film." Journalist Subhash K. Jha said that "Jhalki is a heartwarming at times heart-stopping saga about the loss of innocence and a flash of hope." Critic Bhavikk Sangghvi praised the film and stated that "Jhalki’ is a refreshing take on brother-sister bonding. The ensemble cast gets into the skin of their characters while Aarti's performance will make you go ‘awww’ while Goraksh is earnest to the core. Brahmanand's writing will tug your heartstrings while his direction is sensitive."

Indian writer Deepa Gahlot likened the film's titular character to "a super hero without a cape".

== Awards and Selections ==
Year	Award	Category
2019	Boston International Film Festival (BIFF 2019)	Best Original Screenplay
2019	A Show For A Change Film Festival (ASCFF 2019)	Best Cinematography
2019	International Independent Film Awards Los Angeles (IIFA 2019)	Best Screenplay - Platinum
2019	International Independent Film Awards Los Angeles (IIFA 2019)	Best Concept - Platinum
2019	International Independent Film Awards Los Angeles (IIFA 2019)	Best Cinematography - Platinum
2019	International Independent Film Awards Los Angeles (IIFA 2019)	Best Original Score - Platinum
2019	International Independent Film Awards Los Angeles (IIFA 2019)	Best Original Song - Platinum
2019	International Independent Film Awards Los Angeles (IIFA 2019)	Best Animated Visuals - Platinum
2019	International Screen Awards (ISA 2019)	Platinum Award for International Feature Film
2019	International Screen Awards (ISA 2019)	Golden Emerging International Feature Film
2019	Indian International Film Festival Of Boston (IIFFB 2019)	Best Social Cause Film
2019	Indian Film Festival of Cincinnati (IFFCINCY 2019)	Best Feature Film
2019	Washington DC South Asian Film Festival (DCSAFF 2019)	Best Director Award
2019	New York Indian Film Festival (NYIFF 2019)	Official Selection
2019	Beirut International Film Festival (BIFF 2019)	Official Selection
2019	Smile International Film Festival for Children and Youth (SIFFCY 2019)	Official Selection
2019	Kolkata International Film Festival (KIFF 2019)	Official Selection
2019	Jagran Film Festival (JFF 2019)	Official Selection
2019	Boston International Film Festival (BIFF 2019)	Official Selection
2020	Beloit International Film Festival (BIFF 2020)	Official Selection
2020	Jaipur International Film Festival (JIFF 2020)	Official Selection
2020	International Children's Film Festival India (ICFF 2020)	Official Selection
2020	UK Asian Film Festival (UKAFF 2020)	Official Selection

== See also ==
- List of Indian Nobel laureates
