= Haal E Kangaal =

Haal-E-Kangaal
- Directed by: Ramchandra P. N.
- Written by: Ramchandra P. N.
- Produced by: Sonk Films
- Starring: Niraj Sah, Hemant Mahaur
- Cinematography: Narayanan Venkataraman
- Release date: April 20, 2014 (Manipal International Film Festival)
- Running time: 105 minutes
- Country: India
- Language: Hindi

Haal-E-Kangaal (Hindi: हाल ए कंगाल, English: The Bankrupts) is a minimalist Hindi language feature film. The film is shot in a single location – a suburban flat in the city of Mumbai. The film stars only two actors. Ramchandra PN served as both the writer and director. The film is a black comedy that is a humorous account of the artistic and intellectual bankruptcy of independent filmmaking scene that presently exists in India. In a larger context, the film subtly debates the role of a filmmaker / artist in a highly competitive self centric world.

== Plot ==
Two struggling filmmakers meet after a gap of fifteen years and have to spend a few hours together. As one of them narrates a script of a film to the other over liberal doses of drinks, the past catches up with them and for the two friends the celebration soon turns into a secession of one up-man-ship where accusations flow freely – the question of success, of failures and of a subtle comparison of individual achievements arise. The duo by the end of the film realise that they are as bankrupt as ever – literally, and in all sense of the word.

== Cast ==
- Niraj Sah as Tripurari Gupta (Trips)
- Hemant Mahaur as Lokesh Sharma

== Premiere ==
A rough cut was shown in 2014 at the Manipal International Film Festival. The group Popup talkies has been taking the film as a part of its curated package on Indian art house movies to places like Hyderabad and Mumbai.

Haal-E-Kangaal has its premier on the 10th of June 2018 at the Reaktor Indian Film Festival in Vienna, Austria as a part of a package of Indian Art House film curated by programme coordinator Vivek Singhania and Festival director Bernhard Kammel.

== Reception ==
A critic from The Hindu wrote, "Haal E Kangaal is minimal, spartan cinema in every which way. It’s populated with just two characters, the simple plot is devoid of twists and turns".
