= Ramchandra P. N. =

Indian filmmaker

Ramchandra PN
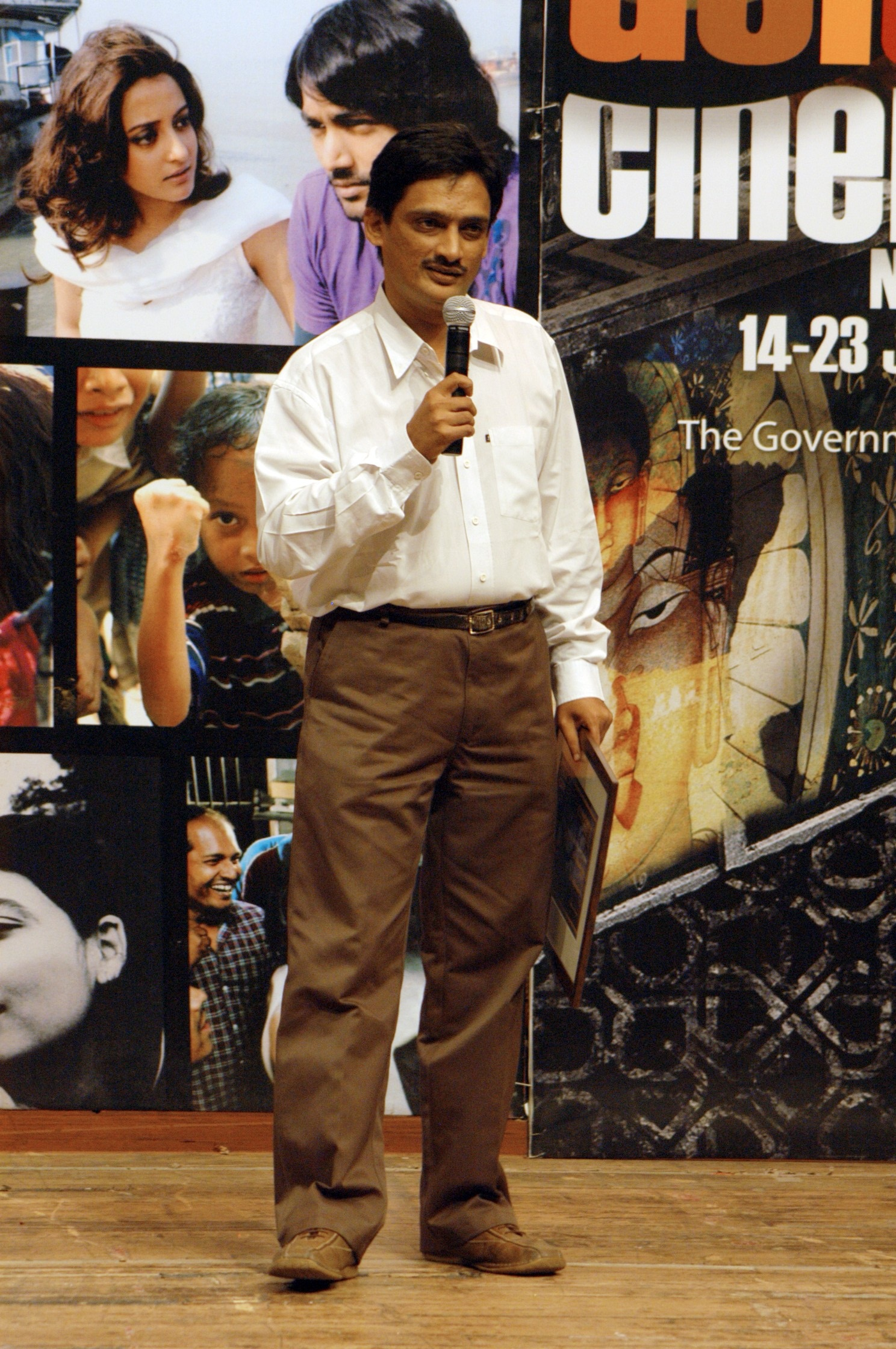
- Born: Ramchandra Perampalli Neckar; 1965 (age 60–61); Udupi, Karnataka
- Occupations: Film director, producer and screenwriter
- Spouse: Sushma PN
- Website: sonkfilms.com

Ramchandra P. N. is a filmmaker making feature films, short films, documentaries and TV programs. in India. He is a Tuluva based in Mumbai.

== Career ==
After graduating from Film and Television Institute of India (FTII), Ramchandra PN thought he would settle down in Bengaluru.

Over the next ten years starting in 1991, as a freelancer, he directed more than hundred short documentaries for this cultural show, subjects mainly pertaining to his home state of Karnataka – on Gangubai Hanagal, Mallikarjun Mansur, Shivaram Karanth, B.V. Karanth, Vijaynath Shenoy's Hastha Shilpa, the Hampi Ruins, the Hoysala Temples, Mysore Ganjifa, the professional stage actresses of Mariyammanahalli, cock fights, the Electronic tampura, the Lokur Joint family in North Karnataka, the Coastal Buffalo race of Kambala among others.

Ramchandra PN has been residing in Mumbai since 1990. Over the years he gradually ventured into other TV programs, feature films, documentaries and short films in English, Hindi, Kannada, Marathi, Bengali, Kutchhi and Tulu languages.

Ten years into doing television, Ramchandra PN found himself in the crossroads of his career for he had not yet made his feature film – the very purpose for which he joined FTII in the first place. Taking advantage of the newly developing digital technology, in the year 2004, with the help of his assistant Surendra Kumar Marnad and friend Mohan Marnad he ventured in producing and directing the first digital feature film in Tulu language called Suddha (The Cleansing Rites). This no-cost film went on to win the Best Indian Film at the 2006 Osian's Cinefan Festival of Asian and Arab films that was held in New Delhi. In 2007 it won a modest exhibition Grant from the Hubart Balls fund under which Ramchandra PN went around with a mobile projector, a portable screen and a sound system to screen the film in more than 100 places in the remote villages of the Tulu-speaking districts of Coastal Karnataka.

In 2008, he shot his second feature Putaani Party (The Kid Gang) – this time in Kannada language and in the district of Dharwad in North Karnataka. This film was produced by The Children's Film Society of India. This film won the Best Children's film at the 2009 National Film Awards.

Ramchandra PN has completed his third feature Haal E Kangaal, in Hindi language and is screening it in alternative venues all over India.

Besides, he also conducts academic workshops in various film schools in India like the FTII, Poona & L. V. Prasad Film Institute, Chennai.

=== On Suddha – The Cleansing Rites ===
The Bangalore edition of the newspaper 'The Hindu had described the film Suddha – The Cleansing Ritesas follows.

"The allure of the 105-minute Tulu film is mainly due to its impressive technical accomplishments. Camerawork by Sameer Mahajan uses light and shade superbly and captures the mood and feel of the story. The interiors of the typical rural house – with peeling walls and old-world appendages – which stand as mute witness of the breaking family have been shot with care and sensitivity."

(Source: The Hindu)

== Awards ==
- 'Putaani Party' – a Children's film directed by Ramchandra PN has jointly won the Swarna Kamal (Golden Lotus) for the Best Children's Film at the 2009 National Film Awards constituted by the Government of India.
- In 2005, Ramchandra PN made a Tulu language digital feature film called Suddha, also known as The Cleansing Rites. This film won the Best Indian Film at the Osian's Cinefan Festival of Asian and Arab Cinema held at New Delhi. The five members jury had given the award for "its poetic, evocative and uncompromising style reflecting the moods of contemporary India."
- In 2004, his short film Heart Troubles of Ramchand Yavathmal Tirchuinapalli Azamghar won the best short film at the Abuja International Film Festival, Nigeria.

== Filmography ==
=== Feature films ===
Year	Title	Cast	Language
2024	Hear O, Mahatma (Hear O, Great One)	Ramchandra PN (Triple Role)	English
2019	Bunnu K. Endo Maye (The Maya of Bunnu K. Endo)	Chitrra Jetliy, Vinnay Vishwaa	Kannada, Hindi
2015	Haal E Kangaal (The Bankrupts)	Niraj Sah, Hemant Mahaur	Hindi
2009	Putaani Party – The Kid Gang	Ranjita Jadhav, Sharad Anchatgiri, Pavan Hanchinaal, Jayalakshmi Patil, Bhavani Prakash	Kannada
2005	Suddha – The Cleansing Rites	Subhash Padivaal, Sai Prakash, Asha Marnad	Tulu

=== Short fiction ===
Year	Title	Cast	Language
2018	Double Life	Saumesh Bangera, Aneesh Pandelu, Ratika Kamath, Santosh Shetty	Hindi
2015	Tiku Tiku Director (The fragile director)	Vidhan Kothari, Satvika Khandgaonkar, Samridh Tandon, Sharman Gupta	Hindi
2012	Khana Khazaana (The treasure meal)	Resh Lamba, Vikas Shukla, Khusboo Upadhaya, Anurag	Hindi
2011	Mister and Mistress	Bijaya Jena, Niraj Sah, Seema Bora, Reema Das	Hindi
2008	Babe se date (Date with a babe)	Kunal Khotari, Sagarika Sawhney, Nikhila Nanduri	Hinglish
2006	Mani Bhai Pass Hogaye? (Did brother Mani succeed?)	Sudhir Choudhary, Rasika Duggal, Shinjini Raval, Oroshikha Day	Hindi
2004	Out of Tune	Anil Pande	Hinglish
2003	Heart Troubles of Ramchand Yavathmal Tiruchinapalli Azamghar	Anil Pande	Hinglish
1991	The Hot Shot	Vinay Edekar, Manisha Kamath	Only music

=== Documentaries ===
Year	Title	Producer	Length	Language	About
2021	R for Roshan's Childhood	Sonk Films	77 minutes	Kannada	Road film
2016	The Unbearable Being of Lightness	Sonk Films	45 mins	English	Dalit Issues
2015	Lohit Diary	Films Division	75 mins	Hindi/English/& 16 other dialects	Life in Lohit Valley in Arunachal Pradesh
2013	Gudigeri Company	Sonk Films	25 mins	Kannada	Life in a professional Theater troupe
2012	BV Karanth:Baba	Films Division	93 mins	Hindi/English/Kannada	Biography of BV Karanth
2012	Rice and Rasam (Anna Saaru)	P.S.B.T.-FD	52 mins	Kannada	Professional theatre troupes in Karnataka
2012	A Pinch of Salt	Films Division	52 mins	Gujarati/English	Education among the Agaria community children
2011	Miyar House	Sonk Films	76 mins	Kannada/English	dismantling of a century old house
2010	Floating Healers	Films Division	52 mins	Bengali/English	A medical boat in Sundarbans
2009	Nuts and Bolts	Sonk Films	29 mins	Kannada	Governance reach in Rural India
2008	Despite Distortions	Sonk Films	4 mins	Hindi/Tulu	A migrant rag-picker
2008	The Untouchables	UNESCO	10 mins	Kannada	The Koraga community
2007	Makkala Panchayat (The Kid Power)	FTII-UNDP	30 mins	Kannada	A children's self-governing Body
2006	Shaky souls, Empty Chairs, Testing Times	Sonk Films	41 mins	Hindi/English	Compulsory Testing of HIV
2005	Bharatha Uvacha (Thus spoke Bharatha)	Films Division	20 mins	Hindi/English	Ancient Indian treatise on theatre 'Natyashastra'
2003	Virus No. One	Sonk Films	10 Mins	Hindi/English/Gujarati	Home care in HIV patients
2002	Kodavas – The Worrier race	Films Division	10 mins	Hindi/Kannada	Kodava Community
2002	My Banjara Diary	Cinema Vision India	50 mins	Hindi/English	Banjara community
2001	Gently down the stream	Gayatree Telesofts	30x2 mins	Hindi/Gujarati/Maliyaali	Traditional ship building
2000	Voices from Mini Tibet	Films Division	10 mins	Hindi	Tibetan settlement in India
1999	Siri Festival	Films Division	10 mins	Hindi/Kannada/Tulu	Possession syndrome in religion
1998	Sarvodayagrama	Films Division	10 mins	Hindi/Kannada	School run on the principles of Acharya Vinoba
1996	Durga Pooja	Dziga Collective	40 mins	Bengali/Hindi	Bengali community in Mumbai

=== TV programmes ===
Year	Title	Channel	Language	Segments/Episodes	Notes
2005	Chacha Chaudary	Sahara TV	Hindi	30 x 70 episodes	Children's serial
2002	Mr & Mrs Kumara Park East	ETV – Kannada	Kannada	30 x 10 episodes	Sitcom
2001	Swamy Swamy	ETV – Kannada	Kannada	30 x 53 episodes	Detective comedy
2000	Teletubbies	Pogo TV and BBC World	English	4 x 25 segments	Children's show
2000	Swara Sadhana	Doordarshan	Hindi	30 x 26 episodes	Musical show
1999	Sahara Skits	Sahara TV	Hindi	4 mins x 10 segments	Comic show
1997	India Anjaana	Home TV	Hindi	5 mins x 10 segments	Cultural Magazine
1996	Naukar Hamara	Doordarshan	Hindi	12 mins x 26 episodes	Sitcom
1995	The First Edition	Doordarshan	English	23 mins a week x 6 months	Current affairs
1991–2000	Surabhi	Doordarshan	Hindi	4 mins x 100 segments	Cultural magazine

== Film reviews ==
Ramchandra reviews films for Upper Stall
