= Putaani Party =

- Film poster
- Directed by: Ramchandra P. N.
- Screenplay by: Ramchandra P. N.
- Story by: Jayalakshmi Patil; Mayyur Dandewale
- Produced by: Children's Film Society, India
- Cinematography: Sameer Mahajan
- Edited by: Arunabha Mukerjee
- Music by: Vijay Prakash
- Distributed by: Children's Film Society, India
- Release date: 2009
- Running time: 78 minutes
- Country: India
- Language: Kannada

Putaani Party (Kannada: ಪುಟಾಣಿ ಪಾರ್ಟಿ, English: The Kid Gang) is a 2009 Kannada language feature film. Produced by Children's Film Society, India, the film was shot in a village called Honnapura situated near the town of Dharwad in South India. The film uses local actors, most of them first timers who are new to the medium of films. The film has a particular dialect of Kannada that is spoken by a few in that part of India.

This film has been scripted and directed by Ramchandra PN, a graduate of the Film and Television Institute of India, Pune. His earlier film Suddha had won the best Indian film at the Osian's Cinefan Festival of Asian Films, New Delhi, 2007. Putaani Party is his second feature film and his first in Kannada language.

== Plot ==
Children in action

A Gram Panchayat (village governing body) in rural India facilitates the functioning of the Makkala Samiti (Children’s Committee) – a children’s body elected by the children themselves.

The committee acts as a pressure group in trying to get the local governance react to various social issues that it raises. Guided by a sympathetic school teacher, the children’s honesty and persistency ruffles many feathers among the adults, some of whom have been using the ‘Makkala Samiti’ for their own needs.

What follows is a subtle cat and mouse game, by the end of which the children hope to get their voice heard.

The film subtly speaks about the Children's rights to self governance and the pathetic attitude we adults have towards this issue.

== Awards ==
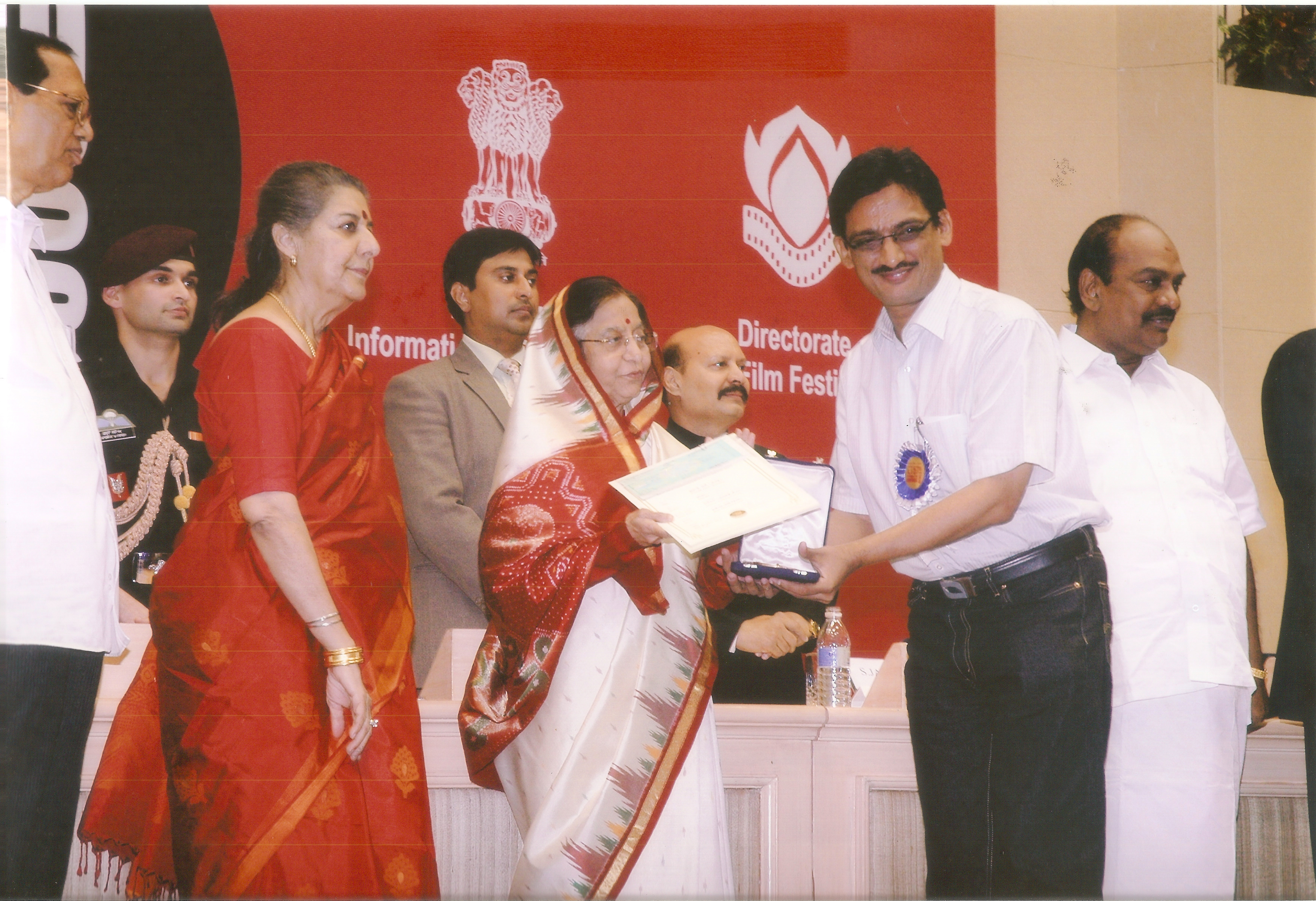
57th National Film Awards

The film has won the Swarna Kamal (Golden Lotus) for the 57th National Film Award for Best Children's Film for the year 2009 constituted by the Government of India.

== Film festival participation ==
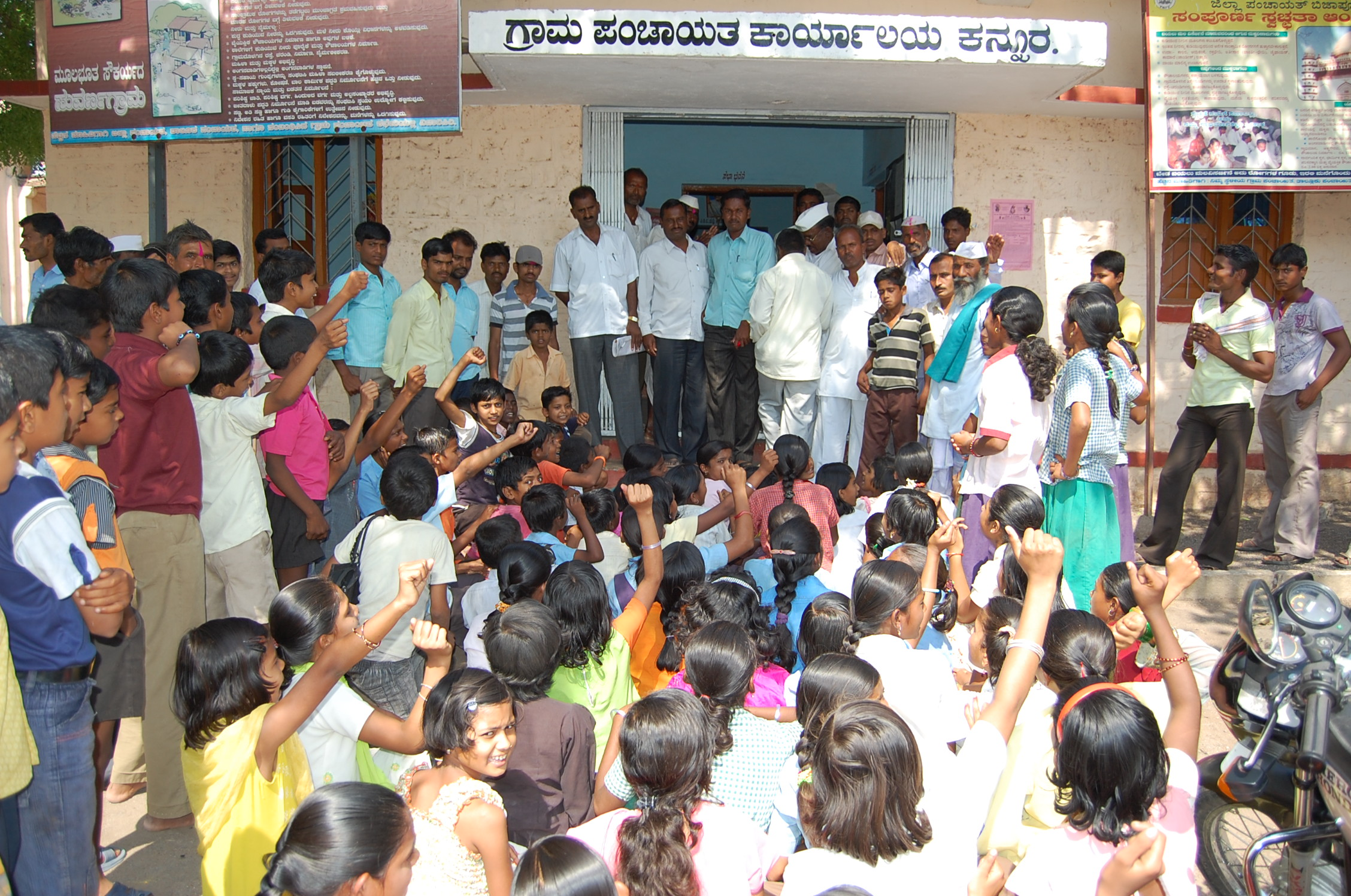
Protest by Kannur Children

- The Global Film Festival of Indore, India, 2009
- The Mumbai International Film Festival for Children, India, 2009
- Kolkata Film Festival, India, 2009
- Istanbul Children's Film Festival, Turkey, 2009
- Bangladesh Children's Film Festival, Bangladesh
- The Cairo International Film Festival for Children, Egypt, 2010
- CMS Children's Film Festival, Lucknow, India, 2010
- Bengaloru Habba Children's Film Festival, Bengaluru, India 2010
- International Children's Film Festival of Iran, 2010

== Cast ==
Gaarya

- Ranjita Jadhav as Geeta
- Pavan Hanchinaal as Gaarya
- Sharat Anchatgiri as Anil
- Gurudutta Joshi as Chandru
- Deepak Joshi as Hussain
- Bhavani Prakash Babu as Neelu Teacher
- Jayalaxmi Patil as Nancy
- CS Patil as Deshpande
- Mukund Maigur as Health Minister

(Source: Upperstall.com)

== Controversies ==
Putaani Party was dragged into a controversy that was not of its own making, when one jury member of the National Film Awards revealed some bit of the jury deliberations to the press in Kerala. He claimed that Kesu the joint winner of the award was based on one of his earlier films, but claimed responsibility for Kesu jointly getting the award. Also, the jury member revealed that because no single film deserved the National Award for Best Children's Film, it was given to two films.
