= Rice and Rasam =

Rice and Rasam (ಅನ್ನ ಸಾರು)
- Directed by: Ramchandra P. N.
- Produced by: PSBT
- Cinematography: Ramchandra P. N.
- Edited by: Ramchandra P. N.
- Distributed by: PSBT
- Release date: 2012
- Running time: 52 minutes
- Country: India
- Language: Kannada

Rice and Rasam (ಅನ್ನ ಸಾರು) is a 52 minutes documentary film produced by Rajiv Mehrotra of the PSBT (Public Service Broadcasting Trust) in the year 2012. It is directed by Ramchandra PN, under a fellowship that is awarded by PSBT for the year 2011-2012. The film is about the nomadic life style of the artists of the professional theater troupes in Karnataka, South India.

== Company Theater ==
Influenced by the proscenium Parsi theater style, professional theater troupes were quite popular in the state of Karnataka during the 19th century. These theater troupes are commonly called as 'Company Theater'. The nomadic artists of the company theater move from one village to another, pitch tin sheet tents and stage plays. The best known exponent of this was the Gubbi Company, a theater troupe run by the legendary Gubbi Veeranna. But changing times has brought in a decline of these artists.

'By the year 1900, professional theater activity became institutionalized .These troupes staged plays periodically in many towns and cities and also during annual Jaatras and important festivals in different regions. With both the Maharaja and the public patronizing them more and more theater became a part and parcel of daily life. Initially the stage used to be lit with kerosene lamps and subsequently gaslights were used, to be replaced later by electric lights.'

(Source: Karnataka Varthe)

== Plot ==
The film deals with the two troupes of professional theater artist Rajanna Jewargi as they struggle to adapt to times, remain relevant and survive. Gubbi Nagesh, a member of the erstwhile Gubbi Company, his wife Gubbu Manjula, son Prashant Gubbi, daughter Sweta Gubbi are also part of this entourage. The film shows the dismantling and reconstruction of the theater; and the condition in which the artists live.

'While Rice and Rasam of 52 minute duration deals with the quotidian daily routines, struggles, mediocrity, conflicts and joy, it simultaneously is critical of rapidly changing scenario of economic decline in Gubbi Theater.'

(Source: Pradip Biswas)

== Title ==
At one point of time when the company theater was at its glory, Companies success were judged by the number of messes that they had and the number of items that they served. But the modern day companies gives its employees only Rice and Rasam, the staple diet of Karnataka. Anything else, the employees will have to either cook themselves or buy it from outside. Hence the name of the film is Rice and Rasam.

== Production ==
The film has been shot in various locations in the Southern State of Karnataka in India - in villages like Jewargi, Kudithini, Mannur and Kukanur - spread over a period of a year during the period 2011–2012.

== Crew ==
While the film has been photographed, editing and directed by Ramchandra PN, location sound is by Santosh Kumar and Sound Designer and Sound Editing is by Mohandas VP.

== Film Festival Participation ==
Rice and Rasam has already been screened at the Open Frame Film Festival conducted by PSBT in 2012 and the Prague Indian Film Festival held at Prague, Czech Republic also held in 2012.

== See also ==
- Gubbi Veeranna
