= BV Karanth:Baba =

B V Karanth:Baba
- Directed by: Ramchandra P. N.
- Written by: Vaidehi (dialogue)
- Screenplay by: Ramchandra P. N.
- Produced by: Films Division
- Cinematography: Sameer Mahajan
- Edited by: Ramchandra P. N.
- Distributed by: Films Division
- Release date: 2012
- Running time: 93 minutes
- Country: India
- Language: Kannada

B V Karanth:Baba (Kannada: ಬಿ ವಿ ಕಾರಂತ:ಬಾಬ), is a biographical Kannada-language documentary film on the life and times of BV Karanth, the man whose influenced Post Independence Modern Indian theater the most.

The film is directed Ramchandra P. N. and the producer is Films Division, an organisation under the Ministry of Information and Broadcasting, Government of India. The film bases itself on B V Karanth's autobiography Illiralaare, Allige Hogalaare (I Can't stay here, I won't go there) in Kannada language compiled by well known Kannada writer Vaidehi.

== Synopsis ==
B V Karanth runs away as a child from his house in Babukodi in Karnataka to learn music in Mysore; instead he joins Gubbi Company, a professional theater company run by the legendary theater and film personality Gubbi Veeranna. Quest for knowledge first takes him to Banaras in North India where he learns Hindi language and Indian classical music and then to Delhi where he joins the second batch of the theater course at the National School of Drama. He later travels all over India conducting workshops and training people in modern theater. Films beckon him and his films gain critical acclaim and awards in India. He returns to Delhi to head the National School of Drama. Restlessness leads him to Bhopal in Madhya Pradesh where he starts the Rang Mandal, a professional theater repository for the Bharat Bhavan under the Government of Madhya Pradesh. He returned to Mysore to start the Rangayana, yet another theater repertory, this time Kannada language based. B V Karanth continues to work till his death due to cancer in 2002.

== Production ==
The film was shot in Babukodi, Puttur, Manchi, Mysore, Varanasi, New Delhi, Bhopal, Mysore, Heggodu and Udupi. The film features some of the contemporaries of B V Karanth like Paramashivam, Vishnuchandra Sharma, Kashinath Singh, Kuwarji Agrawal, Banushankar Metha, Ashok Vajpeyee, Girish Karnad, Girish Kasaravalli, Alaknandan, Prasanna, Na Ratna and J H Nayak. Chidambar Rao Jambe, Kirti Jain, Akshara, Raghunandana, K G Krishnamurty, Srinivas Bhat, Neelam Mansingh and T S Nagabharana and a host of other students of B V Karanth are also featured.

"Although it bases itself on BV Karanth's autobiography Illialaare, Allige Hogallare, the film introduces and then unfolds Karanth's life through a series of memories through the words of many of BV Karanth's colleagues, friends, relatives and students."

(Source:Upperstall)

== Festival screenings ==
- Bollywood Film Festival
