= The Unbearable Being of Lightness =

- Film poster
- Directed by: Ramchandra P. N.
- Written by: Ramchandra P. N., Sudipto Mondal
- Starring: Saumesh Bangera
- Cinematography: Ramchandra P. N.
- Edited by: Ramchandra P. N.
- Release date: 12 November 2016 (KIFF)
- Running time: 45 minutes
- Country: India
- Language: English

The Unbearable Being of Lightness is a 2016 documentary film directed by Ramchandra PN.

== Summary and production ==
The Unbearable Being of Lightness covers events surrounding the suicide of Rohith Vermula. Ramchandra decided not to use video recorded by the students during the workshop or amateur footage shot by protesters, to avoid producing a workshop film or a protest film, and instead to strike a reflective tone, representing various points of view.

== Release and screenings ==
The film was premiered on 12 November 2016 at the Kolkata International Film Festival. The film was the official selection in competition section in the Long Documentary category at the 10th International Documentary and Short Film Festival of Kerala.

== Reception ==
The Hindu in its Sunday edition has describes the film as uncomfortable.

"Against this peaceful, even nonchalant, setting are visible the faint silhouette of a face and a dark crop of unruly hair as we hear Vemula’s last words. This juxtaposition is deliberately uncomfortable. It makes the reality of what is being read out and the general sense of indifference and injustice hang even heavier. Odd angles and the frequent use of a black screen add to this jarring visual experience, an instance of form mirroring content."

(Source: The Hindu)

The New Minute too describes the film on similar lines.

"The 45 minute documentary captures protests too, but as an observer and not participant. The uncomfortable camera angles and shaky focus are deliberate - this is not a film you're meant to sit back and watch."

(Source: The News Minute)

== Certificate of exemption at IDSFFK ==
The Unbearable Being of Lightness along with two other films, March March March, directed by Kathu Lukose and In the Shade of Fallen Chinar, directed by N.C. Fazil and Shawn Sebastian, was denied an exemption from certification from the Information and Broadcasting Ministry, Government of India at the 10th International Documentary and Short Film Festival of Kerala (IDSFFK) that was held 16–20 June 2017 for the subjects that they had chosen and thus were denied screenings. There were widespread protests and parallel screenings held in various places. The government of Kerala registered a case at the Kerala High Court against the order.
