= Nilanjana Sarkar =

Indian singer

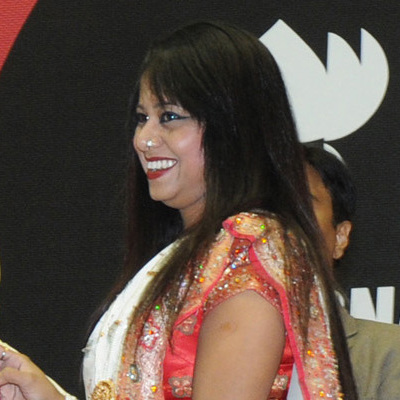
The President, Smt. Pratibha Devisingh Patil presenting the Rajat Kamal Award to Ms. Nilanjana Sarkar for the Best Female Playback Singer (Film: Houseful), at the 57th National Film Awards function, in New Delhi on 22 October 2010. The Union Minister for Information and Broadcasting, Smt. Ambika Soni and the Minister of State for Information and Broadcasting, Shri Choudhury Mohan Jatua are also seen.

Nilanjana Sarkar aka Neelanjona Sabyasachi Thakur is a playback singer who received the 57th National Film Awards (2009) for her song in the Bengali film Houseful. She has several ad jingles to her credit. The song bish, for which she won the national award, was composed by the band Kaya. She is also famed as RJ Neel of 92.7 Big Fm. Her show Raater Otithi ruled the airwaves over a decade.

She married Sabyasachi Chakraborty Thakur on 2 December 2018.
