= Miyar House =

2011 Indian Kannada-language film

- Directed by: Ramchandra P. N.
- Screenplay by: Ramchandra P. N.
- Produced by: Sonk Films
- Starring: Ramchandra P. N.
- Cinematography: Ajay Raina
- Edited by: Ramchandra P. N.
- Release date: 2011
- Running time: 76 minutes
- Country: India
- Language: Kannada

Miyar House (Kannada: ಮಿಯಾರು ಮನೆ) is a Kannada language feature film in the documentary genre directed and produced by the Mumbai-based director Ramchandra P. N. It was completed in 2011. It tells the personal story of the director as his ancestral house is dismantled in a remote village called Miyar in Karkala Taluk in Udupi district in Karnataka, South India. The film was produced by the director's own firm, Sonk Films, and it features many members of the filmmaker's extended family. The film has a particular dialect of Kannada that is spoken by a few in that part of Karnataka.

== Plot ==
The filmmaker's 200-year-old ancestral house is dismantled, giving him an opportunity to undertake a journey into the past. He shares history not only with his extended family, but also with successive generations of India’s rural population. Armed with a cranky digital camera, he and his friend Ajay Raina set out to document the dismantling process. They meet the four owners of the house – the uncles and aunt of the filmmaker - and gather from them what it means to undergo the process of change and migration. A sense of nostalgia and loss, as well as the excitement and the insecurity of the future, accompany this process, the essence of which is transition. A realization of the inevitability of this transition marks this journey. It could well have been the journey of a country that has propelled itself into modernity. As plans are on for the house to get reconstructed elsewhere in an open-air museum, out of its original context – for the filmmaker, the fossilization seems to be complete. The film ends with a tile saying that the filmmaker's father died in Mumbai in 2010.

== Production ==
Filming took place in 2001.

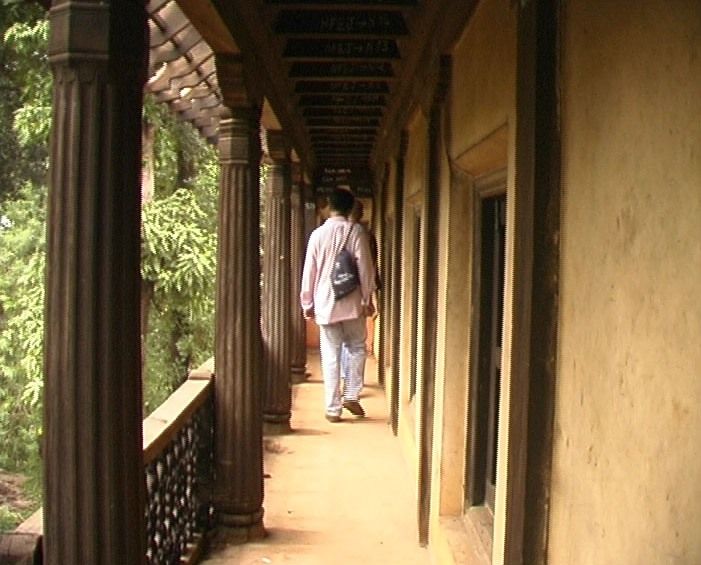
A still from the film

=== Characters ===
The filmmaker himself is the main character in the film. The film follows him as he makes his journey and as he convinces his father, uncle and aunt to make one last visit to Miyar, as the house gets dismantled. The filmmaker's extended family members are also prominent characters in the film as they remember the days and times when they used to visit Miyar.

=== Editing ===
For eight years the eight hour long rushes lay unused with the filmmaker. Ramchandra PN gathered himself to assemble the film in 2009 when he had an opportunity to do a teaching stint in Film and Television Institute of India in Pune, the school in which he himself had learned the art of making films.

== Festival screenings ==
- 4th International Documentary and Short Film Festival of Kerala
- The Prague Indian Film Festival
