= Houseful (2009 Bengali film) =

- Directed by: Bappaditya Bandyopadhyay
- Written by: Neel Sarkar; Bappaditya Bandyopadhyay
- Produced by: Debashish Saha; Seema Saha
- Starring: Prosenjit Chatterjee; Rimjhim Gupta; Nitya ganguly Rwita Datta Chakraborty; Sreelekha Mitra
- Cinematography: Bappaditya Bandyopadhyay
- Edited by: Dipak Mandal (also misspelled as 'Dipak Mandol' and 'Deepak Mandal')
- Music by: Kaya
- Release date: 2009
- Country: India
- Language: Bengali

Houseful (alternatively House Full) is a 2009 Bengali language film directed by Bappaditya Bandopadhyay. In this film, the star Prosenjit Chatterjee's character is a movie director who creates artistic films that flop and are not selected for awards. After several tries and exhausting his own funds, he is forced to do commercial Bengali films. In this film Sreelekha Mitra makes a guest appearance.

== Synopsis ==
Nikhil (Prosenjit Chatterjee) is in distress over his failures. His personal circumstances are in shambles and he has defaulted on most of his obligations. His assistant asks him to make a commercial film on the lines of a Tamil film to revive his career. He refuses and decides to make his own film by producing it himself. He convinces his father to mortgage their house. He receives a call from Subhash one day who provides him with finances, but in return he would have to accept the actress of the man's choice. Nikhil agrees and they start shooting with Sujata, better known as Nandita (Rimjhim Gupta).

A series of explosions take place in the city and Subhash is accused. He is also Sujata's boyfriend. Sujata is arrested. The film meets the same fate as his other films. Nikhil finally agrees to make a commercial film.

== Awards ==
- 2009 National Film Awards (India)
- Won – Silver Lotus Award – Best Female Playback Singer – Nilanjana Sarkar for rendering the song "Boye jay sudhu bish..."
