= Suddha (film) =

Suddha (The Cleansing Rites)
- Directed by: Ramchandra P. N.
- Written by: Ramchandra P. N. Dialogues: Narayana Nandalike; Mohan Marnad; Surendra Kumar
- Produced by: Sonk Films
- Cinematography: Sameer Mahajan
- Edited by: Ramchandra PN
- Release date: 2005
- Running time: 105 minutes
- Country: India
- Language: Tulu

Suddha, also called The Cleansing Rites, is an Indian film, the first-ever Tulu language film shot in the digital format. The 105-minute film was shot in 2004 in a village called Marnad near Mangalore, Karnataka, and was released in 2005. The film is an adaptation of the Tulu Sahitya Academy award-winning Tulu play called Bojja written by Mumbai-based playwright, Narayana Nandalike. Suddha was produced by three Mumbai Tuluvas Mohan Marnad, Surendra Kumar and Ramchandra PN. It was directed by Ramchandra PN, a graduate of the Film and Television Institute of India, Poona. Suddha was his first feature-length film.

== Plot ==
Suddha depicts the death of the feudal system that existed among the Tulu speaking community in coastal Karnataka for many years, and the impact of The Land Ceiling Act which was ushered during the 1960s and 1970s, had on its social structure. It is the story of modern India – of changing caste equations and a realization of this reality among the land-owning class, albeit a bit late. Though the film is set in a remote village near Mangalore, it could well have happened in any other village elsewhere in India.

An ex-landlord family comes to terms with the fact that they are living in their last leg of feudal existence when it cannot perform a last rites in a grand manner in which it was once used to.

== Cast ==
- Subash Padiwaal
- Boja Shetty
- Mohandas
- Sharada Devi
- Sujata Mudradi
- Sai Krishna Kudla
- Aasha Marnad

== Production ==
=== Use of sound ===
The uniqueness of this film is that it uses available lights and natural sounds. The sound tack or the sound design of this film as a text is something new to Tulu cinema. There is no background music in the film, carefully places sound effects themselves give the effect that music gives.

"The film uses the chirping of birds, flowing water and folklore-like songs extensively as its outdoor sound and ticking sound of clock for the indoor sound. The ticking sound of clock and a frequent presence of radio songs, successfully create a calm village house environment. The cinematography, by depicting the mud walls, wooden carvings of windows and doors and the lush greenery of the village helps to take this film to a next level."

(Source:Astro Shiva)

== Release ==
=== Alternative distribution system ===
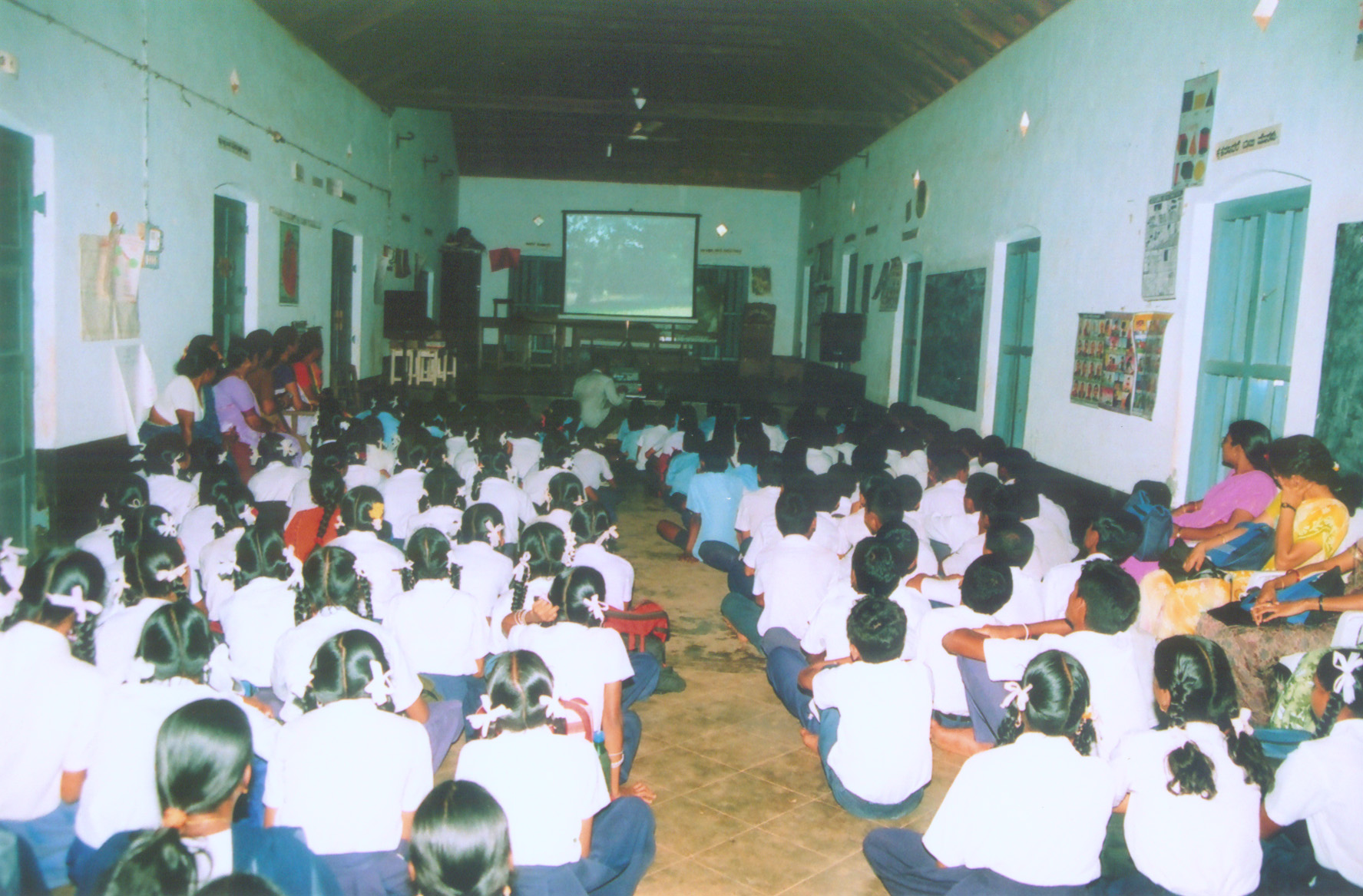
A screening of Suddha (The Cleansing Rites) in a village school

Suddha got digitally screened in various colleges affiliated with the Mangalore University through DVD players and medium sized digital projectors. The Mangalore University caters to the two Tulu language speaking districts of Karnataka, South India. The local cultural troupes, amateur drama clubs and literary groups also helped giving platform to this film in its quest to reach its audience. Around hundred screenings have taken place; some of them in the most remote areas of the two districts. These screenings were facilitated by a modest grant from 'The Hubart Bals' fund, based out of the Netherlands. Writer and Filmmaker Ranjan Das in his regular column at mydigitalfc.com talks about how hard it was to get the film an audience.

"Mumbai-based filmmaker Ramchandra PN is a name that wouldn’t ring a bell to most filmgoers. In 2006, his Tulu language film, Sudhha, fetched an award for the Best Indian Film at the prestigious Osian Film Festival in Delhi, beating heavy duty competitors like Rituparno Ghosh, Girish Kasaravalli and Santosh Sivan. When he approached the owner of a giant media house and film lab in Mumbai, who incidentally hailed from his home state Karnataka, to hawk his film, the tycoongrumbled in Kannada —“Why didn’t you make the film in Hindi?”"

(Source: mydigitalfc.com article)

== Awards ==
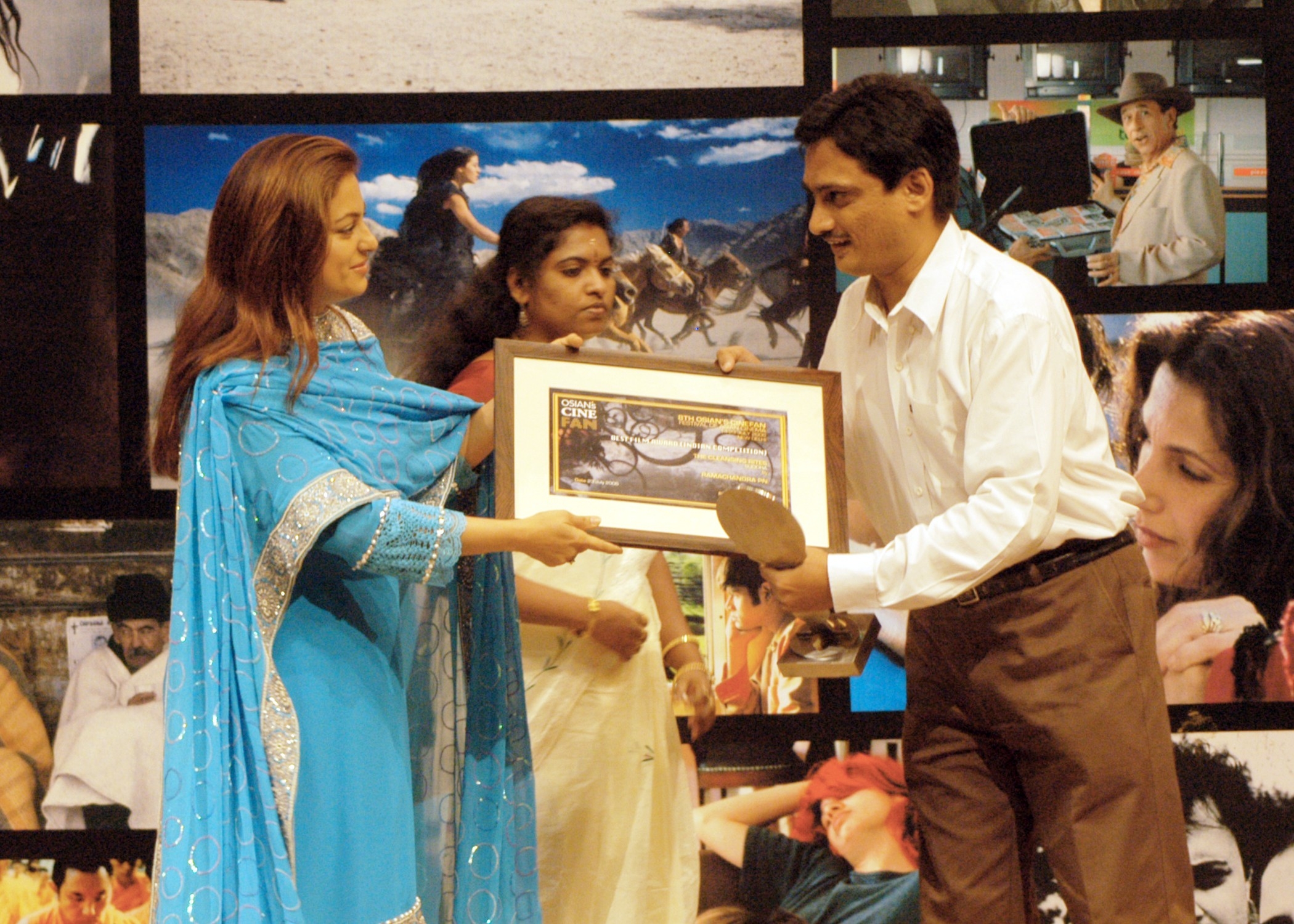
The Osean Cinefan Award

- Best Film in the Indian Competition Section at the Osian's Cinefan Festival of Asian and Arab Cinema held at New Delhi, 2006.
- Best Film at the Karnataka Mini Digital Film Festival, India 2007

Suddha has been screened at the following International Film Festivals.

- The Third Annual 'Bollywood and Beyond' Film festival, Stuttgart, Germany in the 'Cinema of Language' section in 2006
- 8th Osian's Cinefan Festival of Asian and Arab Cinema, New Delhi 2006.
- The Split Film Festival, Split, Croatia, 2006
- Semi-finalist at the Moondance Film Festival, USA 2006.
- Austin Asian Film Festival, Austin United States, 2006
- The Chennai International Film Festival, Chennai, India, 2006
- Bring Your Own Film Festival, Puri, India 2007 (Inaugural Film)
- The Buffalo Niagara International Film Festival, 2007
- Karnataka Mini Digital Film Festival, India, 2007
- Swansea Bay International Film Festival, UK, 2007
- Golden Apricot International Film Festival, Armenia 2007
