= B. V. Karanth =

Indian filmmaker, theatre personality (1929–2002)

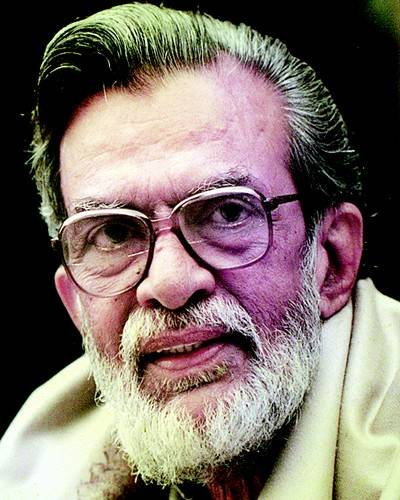
- B. V. Karanth
- Born: Babukodi Venkataramana Karanth; 19 September 1929; Manchi, Kingdom of Mysore, British India
- Died: 1 September 2002 (aged 72); Bangalore, Karnataka, India
- Occupations: Composer, film director, screenwriter, actor
- Spouse: Prema Rao (1958−2002; his death)

Babukodi Venkataramana Karanth (19 September 1929 – 1 September 2002) widely known as B. V. Karanth was an Indian film director, playwright, actor, screenwriter, composer, and dramatist known for his works in the Kannada theatre, Kannada cinema, and Hindi cinema. One of the pioneers of the parallel cinema movement in India, Karanth was an alumnus of the National School of Drama (1962) and later, its director. He received the Sangeet Natak Akademi Award (1976), six National Film Awards, and the civilian honor Padma Shri for his contributions towards the field of art.

== Biography ==
Born into a Kannada speaking family of Manchi, a village near Babukodi in Bantwal taluk of Dakshina Kannada district in 1929, Karanth's passion for theatre started at an early age. His first tryst with theatre was when he was in standard III – he acted in Nanna Gopala, a play directed by P.K. Narayana. He then ran away from home and joined the legendary Gubbi Veeranna drama company where he worked alongside Rajkumar who also was starting out then as a novice.

Gubbi Veeranna sent Karanth to Banaras to gain a Master of Arts degree, where he also underwent training in Hindustani music under Guru Omkarnath Thakur. Thereafter, along with his wife, Prema Karanth, Karanth set up "Benaka", one of Bangalore's oldest theatre groups. It is an acronym for Bengalooru Nagara Kalavidaru. Then, Prema took up a teaching job in Delhi and supported Karanth through the National School of Drama. He was to return the compliment after he graduated from the NSD, and eventually became its director. He later graduated from the National School of Drama (NSD), New Delhi, in 1962, then headed by Ebrahim Alkazi. Between 1969 and 1972, he worked as a drama instructor at the Sardar Patel Vidyalaya, New Delhi after which the couple returned to Bangalore. Here Karanth dabbled in some cinema as well as music and was involved with the likes of Girish Karnad and U.R. Ananthamurthy in these ventures. He then returned to the NSD, this time as its director in 1977. As the director of NSD, Karanth took theatre to far-flung corners of India. He conducted several workshops in places far away as Madurai in Tamil Nadu. After his stint as the director of NSD, the Madhya Pradesh government invited him to head the Rangamandal repertory under the aegis of the Bharat Bhavan. After rendering yeoman service to the theatre scene in Madhya Pradesh between 1981 and '86, Karanth returned to Karnataka.

In 1989, the Karnataka government invited him to set up a repertory in Mysore, which he named Rangayana and headed until 1995. He was diagnosed with prostate cancer in the late 1990s and died at 8 p.m. (IST) on 1 September 2002 in a private hospital in Bangalore.

== Translator ==
His translations from Sanskrit into Hindi include Swapna Vasavadatta, Uttararama Charita and Mrichchakatika . He has also translated a large number of plays from Kannada to Hindi and vice versa. His translation of Girish Karnad's play Tughlaq into Hindi/Urdu has attained cult status.

== Institutions ==
- 1962: graduated from NSD, winning an award as the best all – round student
- 1977–1981: Director of NSD
- 1981–1988: Founding director of Rangamandal at Bharat Bhavan, Bhopal
- 1989–1995: Founding director of Rangayana, Mysore

== Legacy ==
Karanth entered the Kannada theatre scene in the late 1960s and early '70s. His entry brought about a sea change in Kannada theatre which then was steeped in the old, formal proscenium style. His plays like Jokumara Swamy, Sankranti, Huchu Kudure and Oedipus to name a few, which were directed in the early 1970s, were hailed as trendsetters. These plays touched upon all aspects of theatre like language, music, song, stylisation

The innovative use of music was one Karanth's biggest contributions to theatre. One of Karanth's strengths was his ability to draw on classical, traditional and folk forms and fuse them in his compositions. His plays were less famous for design as for their musical content, which became part of the prose of theatre."

In 2010, at the 12th Bharat Rang Mahotsav, the annual theatre festival of National School of Drama, Delhi, a tribute exhibition dedicated to life, works and theatre of B.V. Karanth and Habib Tanvir was displayed. Jnanpith awardee Nirmal Verma had once described Karanth as "the authentic desi genius of Indian theatre".

== Plays of B. V. Karanth ==
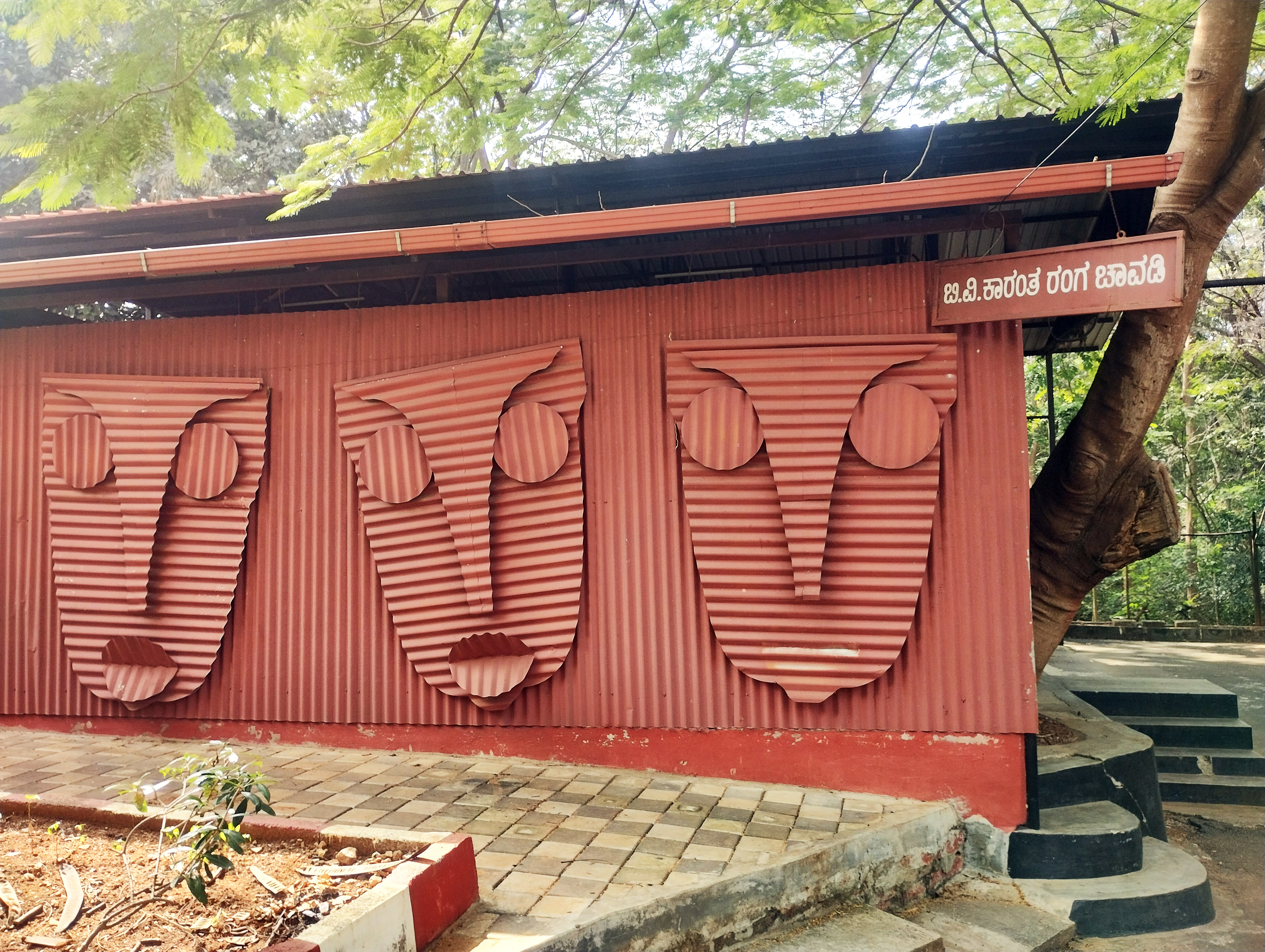
B. V. Karanth theatre space in Rangayana, Mysuru (2025)

Karanth directed over a hundred plays, more than half of which were in Kannada with Hindi close behind. He also directed plays in English, Telugu, Malayalam, Tamil, Punjabi, Urdu, Sanskrit and Gujarati. Hayavadana (by Girish Karnad), Kattale Belaku, Huchu Kudure, Evam Indrajit, Oedipus, Sankranti, Jokumara Swami, Sattavara Neralu, Huttava Badidare and Gokula Nirgamana are some of his most popular plays in Kannada. Of the forty or so plays he directed in Hindi, Macbeth (using the traditional Yakshagana dance drama form), King Lear, Chandrahasa, Hayavadana, Ghasiram Kotwal, Mrichha Katika, Mudra Rakshasa, and Malavikagni Mitra are some of the more popular ones. Karanth also revelled in directing children and directed several children plays like Panjara Shale, Neeli Kudure, Heddayana, Alilu Ramayana and The Grateful Man.

== Benaka ==
In 1974, Karanth started BeNaKa a repertory in Bangalore. Benaka was an acronym for Bengalooru Nagara Kalavidaru. Benaka stages several hugely popular plays like Hayavadana all across Karnataka and even overseas. At Benaka, Karanth also took a special interest in children's theatre and directed several plays with children. This group has been taken care of by Prema Karanth, Karanth's late wife and a noted theatre personality in her own right. She died on 29–10–07.

== Contribution to Madhya Pradesh theatre ==
Karanth was largely responsible for starting the new theatre movement in Madhya Pradesh. As director of the NSD, at the invitation of the Bharat Bhavan in Bhopal, he organized a training-cum-production camp in 1973. In the 1980s, he returned to set up the Rangmandal repertory in Bharat Bhavan. This was to be the first-ever repertory in the state and he became the main creative spirit behind the now-legendary Bharat Bhavan.

Rangmandal, for the first time, folk professionals were used for training contemporary actors, and the repertory also included folk performers among its members. Apart from Hindi, plays were also produced in dialects such as Bundelkhandi, Malavi and Chhattisgarhi which created huge ticket-buying audiences for the Rangmandira.

== Contribution to Andhra Pradesh theatre ==
With the integration of Alarippu and National school of Drama-New Delhi, Karanth had contributed three great plays in Telugu. Collaborated with Surabhi theatre of Andhra Pradesh, Karanth conducted three workshops respectively 'Bhishma' in 1996, 'Chandipriya' in 1997 and 'Basthidevatha yadamma'. It is his dedication that Karanth spent his time during the workshops in corner villages of Andhra Pradesh to brought up the dramas.

== Filmmaking ==
Karanth directed four feature films and four documentaries, apart from scoring the music for 26 films. He co-directed films like Vamsha Vriksha and Tabbaliyu Neenade Magane with Girish Karnad.

== Awards and honors ==
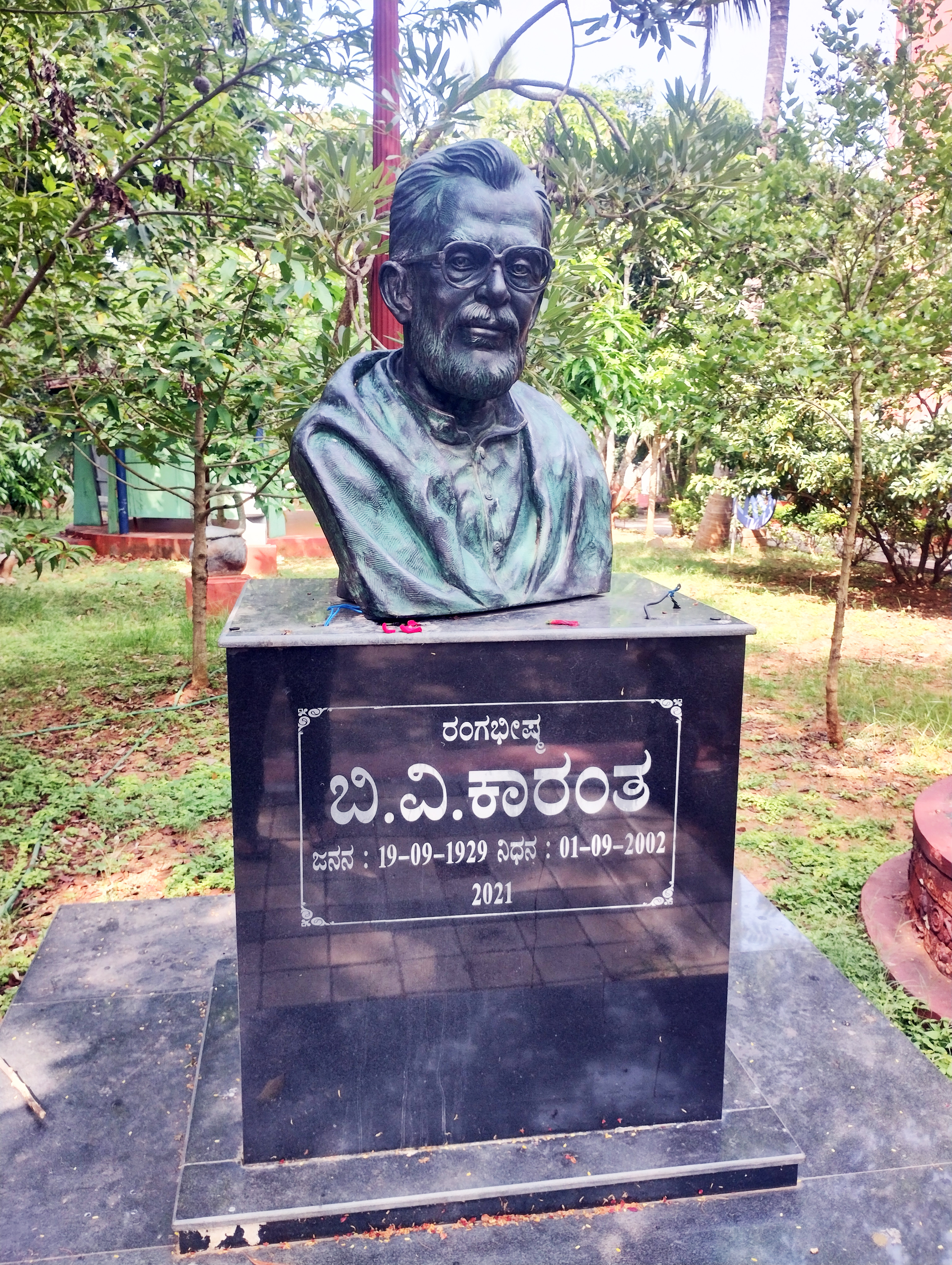
Bust of B. V. Karanth at Rangayana, Mysuru (2025)

Civilian honors

- Padmashri – Government of India, (1981)
- Kalidas Samman – Government of Madhya Pradesh, (1976)
- Gubbi Veeranna Award – Government of Karnataka, (1976)

National Honors

- Sangeet Natak Akademi Award (1976)

National Film Awards

- 1971 – National Film Award for Best Direction – Vamsha Vriksha
- 1971 – National Film Award for Best Feature Film in Kannada – Vamsha Vriksha
- 1975 – National Film Award for Best Feature Film – Chomana Dudi
- 1976 – National Film Award for Best Music Direction: Rishya Shrunga
- 1977 – National Film Award for Best Music Direction: Ghatashraddha
- 1977 – National Film Award for Best Feature Film in Kannada– Tabbaliyu Neenade Magane

Karnataka State Film Awards

- 1971-72 – First Best Film – Vamsha Vruksha
- 1971-72 – Best Dialogue Writer – Vamsha Vruksha
- 1975-76 – First Best Film – Chomana Dudi
- 1975-76 – Best Music Director – Hamsageethe

Filmfare Awards South

- 1972 – Best Director Kannada – Vamsha Vriksha
- 1975 – Best Director Kannada – Chomana Dudi

== Documentary film on B. V. Karanth ==
In 2012, Films Division produced a 93-minute film on BV Karanth called BV Karanth:Baba. The film bases itself on BV Karanth's autobiography in Kannada called Illiralaare, Allige Hogalaare (I can't stay here, I won't go there) compiled by well known Kannada writer Vaidehi.

== Works ==
- Tughlaq (Hindi), by Girish Karnad. Tr. by B. V. Karanth. Rajkamal Prakashan Pvt Ltd, 2005. ISBN 81-7119-790-6.
