= Lohit fonts =

Lohit
- Commissioned by: Red Hat
- Date released: 2004
- License: OFL

Lohit is a font family designed to cover Indic scripts and released by Red Hat. The Lohit fonts currently cover 11 languages: Assamese, Bengali, Gujarati, Hindi, Kannada, Malayalam, Marathi, Oriya, Punjabi, Tamil, Telugu. The fonts were supplied by Modular Infotech and licensed under the GPL. In September 2011, they were retroactively relicensed under the OFL. The Lohit fonts are used as web fonts by some Wikimedia Foundation sites, like Wikipedia, since March 2012.
