= Brahmanand S. Siingh =

Indian filmmaker (born 1965)

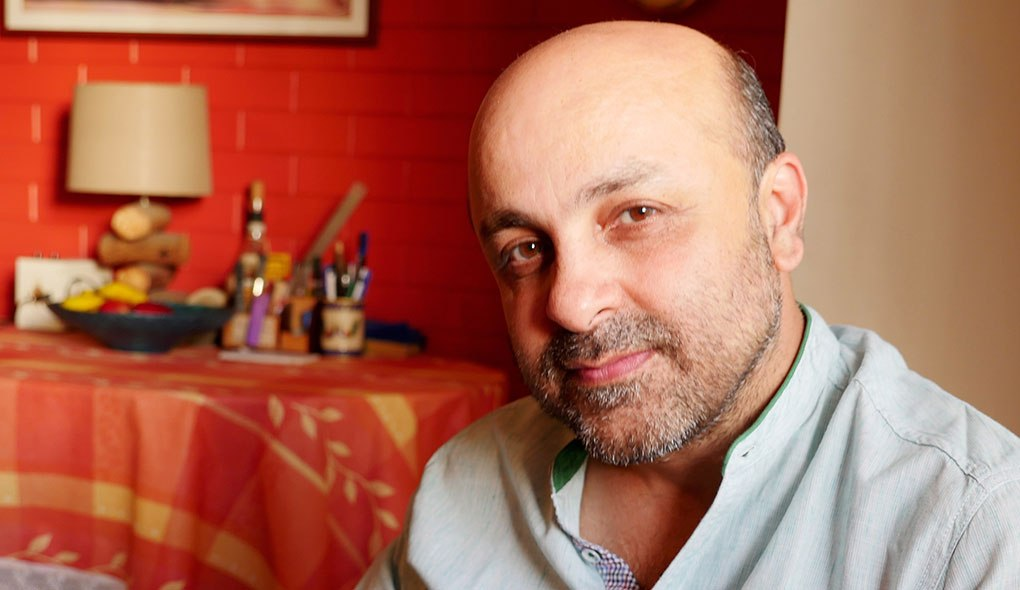
- Born: 3 May 1965 (age 60); Purnia, Bihar, India.
- Occupations: Filmmaker, Author and Life Coach
- Notable work: Pancham Unmixed, Kaagaz Ki Kashti, Jhalki
- Awards: National Film Award for Best Biographical Film National Film Award for Best Historical Reconstruction/Compilation Film REX Karmaveer Chakra Award
- Website: Mobius Films Brahmanand Siingh

Brahmanand S. Siingh (born 3 May 1965) is a filmmaker and author from Mumbai, India. He is best known for the films Kaagaz Ki Kashti, a biopic on Jagjit Singh and his feature-length documentary on R. D. Burman, Pancham Unmixed: Mujhe Chalte Jaana Hai.

== Early life and education ==
Brahmanand S Siingh grew up in Purnia, Bihar. Later he moved to St Xavier's College Ranchi and eventually to Kolkata University for his English Literature Masters. His journeys into cinema, however, started within a year of his moving to Mumbai in 1993.

== Career ==
Brahmanand began writing about art and cinema in the 1980s, publishing articles in publications like The Telegraph, Statesman, Times of India, The Hindu, Indian Express, and The Independent. He also published online work during the dotcom boom. Brahmanand has published over 3,000 articles and features, essays, poems and short stories, as well as three biographical books, Strings Of Eternity, Diamonds & Rust and Lightness Of Being.

He began making films in the late 1990s, mainly producing biographical documentaries and independent films. He is most well known for his experiential biopics on figures like RD Burman and Jagjit Singh (Pancham Unmixed & Kaagaz Ki Kashti). "Strings of Eternity" and "Diamonds and Rust", co-authored with Gaurav Sharma, provide insights into the life, music and personality of maestro RD Burman.

Pancham Unmixed is a rare biographical documentary to have premiered at IFFLA, Los Angeles to a full house. The film also featured on Netflix and is currently streaming on iTunes. Pancham Unmixed was screened by PVR Cinemas on 24-25 Mar, 2018 in screens across the country. It also saw a rare telecast on National Geographic on 26 Dec, 2021. Kaagaz ki Kashti featured on Amazon Prime and travelled to various international film festivals.

He has also won the REX-Karmaveer-Chakra Awards, in partnership with the United Nations, for transforming lives through social impact projects and ideas of hope. Siingh's latest feature project, Jhalki, a feature film that attempts to create public awareness of child trafficking and child labor.

He has also sat on the jury of various international film festivals and award platforms, and conducts filmmaking and scriptwriting workshops.

== Filmography ==
As a director and/or producer.

Year	Title
1997	Ashgari Bai
1998	A burden of Love
1999	Back to Nature
2002	Uncaging the Body
2005	Ragpickers
2008	Pancham Unmixed
2011	Chidiya Rain Basera
2012	Ambassador of Peace
2015	Knowing Pancham
2015	Through Our Eyes
2016	Riding on a Sunbeam
2017	Kaagaz Ki Kashti
2019	Jhalki

== Awards ==
Year	Award	Category	For
2003	Apsara Film Producers Guild Awards	Best Short Film	Uncaging the Body
2008	IFFLA	Critics Special Mention	Pancham Unmixed
2008	Washington DC Film Festival	Audience Choice Award	Pancham Unmixed
2009	57th National Film Awards	Best Compilation Film (Director)	Pancham Unmixed
2009	57th National Film Awards	Best Compilation Film (Producer)	Pancham Unmixed
2010	AIFF	Best Documentary	Pancham Unmixed
2016	Vancouver International South Asian Film Festival	Audience Choice Award	Kaagaz Ki Kashti
2016	Vancouver International South Asian Film Festival	Best Documentary Award	Kaagaz Ki Kashti
2019	International Screen Awards (ISA 2019)	Platinum Award for International Feature Film	Jhalki
2019	Washington DC South Asian Film Festival (DCSAFF 2019)	Best Director Award	Jhalki
2019	Indian Film Festival of Cincinnati (IFFCINCY 2019)	Best Feature Film Award	Jhalki
2019	Indian International Film Festival Of Boston (IIFFB 2019)	Best Social Cause Film Award	Jhalki
2019	International Independent Film Awards Los Angeles (IIFA 2019)	Best Concept Platinum Winners	Jhalki
2019	International Independent Film Awards Los Angeles (IIFA 2019)	Best Screenplay Platinum Winners	Jhalki
2019	Boston International Film Festival (BIFF 2019)	Best Original Screenplay Award	Jhalki
2019	REX-Karmaveer-Chakra	Karmaveer Chakra Award	N/A
