= Re-recording (filmmaking) =

Film audio mixing technqiue

Re-recording is the process by which the audio track of a film or video production is created. As sound elements are mixed and combined the process necessitates "re-recording" all of the audio elements, such as dialogue, music, sound effects, by the sound re-recording mixer(s) to achieve the desired result, which is the final soundtrack that the audience hears when the finished film is played. This may involve processes such as dubbing and automated dialogue replacement.

It is carried out by a re-recording mixer. In Indian cinema, especially Tamil cinema, re-recording refers to background score that is the last stage of film music production.
