= Lohit Diary =

- Directed by: Ramchandra P. N.
- Written by: Ramchandra P. N.
- Produced by: Films Division of India
- Cinematography: Narayanan Venkataraman
- Distributed by: Films Division of India
- Release date: August 13, 2015
- Running time: 76 minutes
- Country: India
- Languages: English, Hindi, Miju Mishimi, Idu Mishimi, Khampti, Assamese

Lohit Diary is a documentary film produced in India, set the Lohit River Valley in East Arunachal Pradesh, North-East India. The film is produced by Films Division of India and is directed by Ramchandra PN. The film, completed in 2015, was shot in and around Tezu, Wakro, Namsai, Chongkham and Yatong areas in Arunachal Pradesh in India.

"The film covers aspects of the threat of opium addiction looming large over the local youth, and social initiatives from the community against the menace such as the opium de-addiction campaign in Chongkham-Namsai, the organic tea-cultivation in Wakro circle led by Basamlu Krisikro, and the ‘Joy of Reading Campaign’ in Yatong, Tezu and Wakro, led by the Lohit Youth Library Movement,"(Source: Arunachal Times)

== Plot ==
Lohit River Valley, the picturesque easternmost remote part of Arunachal Pradesh in India, the land of Mishmi community, is showing signs of prosperity. Epitomized by its colorful flowers that bloom all over is the crop that is responsible, the banned opium. Traditionally, cultivated for rituals and medicinal purposes, today a large portion of the harvest consumed by the cultivators themselves and the rest sold locally to opium addicts to meet the economic needs of the planters.

Breaking this dark vicious circle of this opium culture are three small but significant attempts in stemming the tide.

Basamlu Krisikro began growing green tea when she found its use in the Cancer treatment of her mother. Soon, she began enrolling others; her idea was to bring together opium growing families who would shift to organic green tea on their small holdings, and club them to a mini-factory that processes such tea.

Tewa Manpong was a drug addict; for eighteen years. He had to sell all his properties and was compelled to participate in antisocial activities to fulfill his addiction demands. However, by sheer will power and support of his family members, he is rehabilitated. Today he works as a counselor in a rehabilitation center, supporting others who are addicted.

Uncle Moosa (Sathyanarayanan Mundayoor) used to travel with a trunk full of books into inaccessible areas so that he could read them out to Mishmi children. Today he has a network of libraries wherein story-telling sessions are conducted; and skits based on such books are performed. Many children, after participating in such endeavors are determined not to come under self-destructing habit like drugs.

The film follows these three passionate characters, as they go about their business of empowering others.
