= Samik Bandyopadhyay =

Indian film, theatre critic

- Born: 1940 (age 85–86); Calcutta, West Bengal, India
- Occupations: book editor, film critic, theatre critic, art critic

Samik Bandyopadhyay (Bengali: শমীক বন্দ্যোপাধ্যায়; born 1940) is a Kolkata-based critic of Indian art, theatre and film.

His father Sunit Kumar Banerjee did his PhD on Elizabethan lyrics under Sir H. J. C. Grierson, the discoverer of the metaphysical poets, at University of Edinburgh in the 1930s, and subsequently became a professor of English literature.

Bandyopadhyay entered the prestigious Presidency College, Calcutta in 1955, graduated from the University of Calcutta in 1961, and subsequently earned a Master of Arts degree in English literature. He started working as a lecturer Rabindra Bharati University in 1966. In 1973, he joined the Oxford University Press as an editor and worked there till 1982. He resigned and never sought an employment because no job was lucrative enough for buying the books he wanted to read. He took up tutoring English literature for his profession, which enriched his reading as well as brushed his critical edge. He continued book editing, however, with Seagull Books, till 1988, and then with Thema Publishing.

Bandyopadhyay joined the Communist Party of India after the 20th Congress of the Communist Party of the Soviet Union. Later on, he also witnessed incorporation of Gramscian thought in Indian Marxism. In 1993, his edited book Antonio Gramsci Nirbachita Rachansamagra was published in Calcutta.

== On theatre ==
His first writing on theatre, on the actor Mei Lanfang of Beijing opera, was rather insignificant. His next article was on Jatra performances he saw in 1962; that was published in Bohurupi patrika. His love with theatre intensified and he started interviewing contemporary stalwarts of Bangla theatre, e.g., Utpal Dutt, Badal Sircar, Sombhu Mitra, among others, for further clarifications on their works.

His assessment of Nandikar's 1969 production of Tin Poysar Pala, and adaptation of Brecht's The Threepenny Opera:

"When we have a production of The Three Penny Opera which simply goes in for wild fun, we regard it as a compromise, a betrayal. The production has no point when there is serious political violence in Calcutta. ... This is status quo theatre, which means nothing to a generation that thinks in political terms.

Foucault's influence on him seems to be a later development. For instance, in 1986, he opines that in Vijay Tendulkar's play Ghashiram Kotwal, 'power is defined 'horizontally' (in the sense in which Maurice Duverger uses it in his The Idea of Politics, London, 1966)'. He does not bring in Foucauldian discourse of power yet. In his 2003 introduction to a collection of Tendulkar's plays (including Ghashiram Kotwal'), however, he sees them evolving around the hub of 'strong ethical concern exploring and critiquing the relations of power in all their complex ramifications' where power is 'what Michel Foucault defines as 'the relationship in which one wishes to direct the behaviour of another'.

== On film ==
Introducing his translation of the script of Mrinal Sen's Akaler Sandhane, Bandyopadhyay wrote in 1983 that this film raised 'disturbing questions about the Indian reality today and about the capacity of the medium to tackle this reality.' Samik has been questioning that capacity of film all along. In general, his assessment is as follows:

Bangla theatre or film did not enter into the social-political complexities of the 1970s. The emblemized angry young man of Kolkata could relate to his rural other only on the platform of Marxian theory; rest of the commonality is mere wrath. The urban youth is portrayed not as directly participating in revolutionary activities: he is either hiding, or attacked or living a dual-life. This is the general portrait of Bangali angry young man as seen in theatre and films.

== On editing ==
Book editing can be exciting, he tells in a story to Anandabazar Patrika.

== Bibliography ==
- 1986. Introduction. In Vijay Tendulkar's Ghashiram Kotwal. Calcutta. Seagull Books.
- 1994. Theatrescapes. In Seagull Theatre Quarterly, Issue 1, p. 50-53.
- 1994. 'Nemai Ghosh: Portfolio' and 'Theatrescapes'. In Seagull Theatre Quarterly, Issue 2, Apr 1994. pp52–57, pp. 69–71.
- 1995. 'Theatrescapes'. In Seagull Theatre Quarterly, Issue 7, Oct 1995. pp. 65–66.
- 1996. 'Theatrescapes'. In Seagull Theatre Quarterly, Issue 12, Dec 1996, pp. 70–71.
- 1997. 'New Karnas of Manipur'. In Seagull Theatre Quarterly, Issue 14/15, June/Sep 1997. pp. 73–90.
- 1997. 'Theatrescapes'. In Seagull Theatre Quarterly, Issue 16, Dec 1997. pp. 25–30.
- 1998. 'Theatrescapes'. In Seagull Theatre Quarterly, Issue 19, Sep 1998. pp. 74–77.
- 2001. Dekha Cinema, Cinema Dekha (Cinema Seen, Seeing Cinema). Edited by Someshwar Bhowmik. Kolkata: Anustup Prakashani.
- 2003. Introduction. In Vijay Tendulkar's Collected Plays in Translation. New Delhi: Oxford University Press.
- Āḷekara, S. (2009). Collected plays of Satish Alekar: The Dread departure, Deluge, The Terrorist, Dynasts, Begum Barve, Mickey and the memsahib. New Delhi: Oxford University Press.
- Bandyopadhyay, S. (1971). After Professionalism. The Drama Review. 15 (2), 238–240.
- Banerjee, S. (2001). The new Samsad English-Bengali dictionary of contemporary English: A supplement to Samsad English-Bengali dictionary. Calcutta: Sahitya Samsad.
- Banerjee, S. & Sen, M. (1984). The ruins (Khandahar): A film. Calcutta: Seagull Books.
- Banerjee, S., Sen, S. & Mookerjee, A. (1998). Designs and motifs in Indian art. Calcutta: Sahitya Samsad.
- Banerjee, S., Tendulkar, V., Benegal, S. & Nihalani, G. (1992). Govind Nihalani. Celluloid Chapter documentation. Jamshedpur: Celluloid Chapter.
- Bannerjee, K. & Banerjee, S. (1999). An actress in her time. Jamshedpur: Celluloid Chapter.
- Benegal, S., Bandyopadhyay & Tendulkar, V. (1984). The churning = Manthan. Calcutta: Seagull Books.
- Benegal, S., Banerjee, S. & Datta, A. (1988). Satyajit Ray: Benegal on Ray. Calcutta: Seagull Books.
- Benegal, S., Benegal, S., Ray, S., Datta, A. & Bandyopadhyay, S. (2003). Satyajit Ray: A film by Shyam Benegal; script reconstructed by Alakananda Datta and Samik Bandyopadhyay. Calcutta: Seagull Private Books Limited.
- Benegal, S., Datta, A. & Bandyopadhyay, S. (1988). Benegal on Ray: Satyajit Ray. Calcutta: Seagull books.
- Benegal, S., Tendulkar, V. & Bandyopadhyay, S. (1984). Shyam Benegal's The churning: (Manthan). Calcutta: Seagull Books.
- Bharat Rang Mahotsav & Banerjee, S. (2006). Theatreutsav, 8th Bharat Rang Mahotsav 2006, 2–14 January. New Delhi: Director, National School of Drama.
- Bharat Rang Mahotsav & Banerjee, S. (2007). Bharat Rang Mahotsav, 2007: 9[th] theatre utsav. New Delhi: National School of Drama.
- Bhattacharya, S., Banerjee, S. & Subhāprasanna. (2002). Desire: Works of Shipra Bhattacharya. Kolkata: Sanskriti Art Gallery.
- Biswas, S., Sen Gupta, S. C., Sengupta, S., Dasgupta, B. & Banerjee, S. (2006). Samsad English-Bengali dictionary: With supplement for new words/new meanings 1980–2005. Kolkata: Sahitya Samsad.
- Caṭṭopādhyāẏa, S., Agashe, M., Shahani, K. & Banerjee, S. (2004). Acting in cinema: The Nandini Sanyal memorial lectures, 1999–2002. Kolkata: Thema for Nandini Sanyal Smarak Committee.
- Chakravarty, I., Raman, S. V. & Banerjee, S. (1998). The new Latin American cinema: Readings from within. Jamshedpur: Celluloid Chapter.
- Chatterji, B. C., Ghose, D. N. & Banerjee, S. (2003). Kapalkundala. [Classic translation series]. Kolkata: P.M. Bagchi &.
- Das Gupta, A. & Banerjee, S. (2009). The pen & the brush. New Delhi: Public Service Broadcasting Trust.
- Devi, M. (1990). Bashai tudu. Calcutta: Thema.
- Devi, M. & Devi, M. (1990). Bashai tudu. Calcutta: Thema.
- Elkunchwar, M. & Gokhale, S. (2004). The wada trilogy. Calcutta: Seagull Books.
- Elkunchwar, M., Gokhale, S. & Bhattacharya, S. (2009). Collected plays of Maesh Elkunchwar: Garbo, Desire in the rocks, Old stone mansion, Reflection, Sonata, An actor exits. Delhi: Oxford University Press.
- Gramsci, A., Bhaṭṭācārya, S. & Banerjee, S. (1993). Ānatonio Grāmaśi nirbācita racanāsaṃgraha. Kalikātā: Pāla Pābaliśarsa.
- Gunawardana, A. J., Ghosh, D. & Bandyopadhyay, S. (1971). Problems and Directions: Calcutta's New Theatre. A Conversation with Two Critics Dharani Ghosh and Samik Bandyopadhyay. The Drama Review. 15 (2), 241–245.
- Gupta, D., Sharma, B. D. & Banerjee, S. (1993). Indian cinema: Contemporary perceptions from the thirties. Celluloid chapter documentations, 4. Jamshedpur: Celluloid Chapter.
- Hauff, R., Katyal, A. & Banerjee, S. (1987). Ten days in Calcutta: A portrait of Mrinal Sen. Calcutta: Seagull Books.
- Mahāśvetā Debī. (1997). Five plays / Mahasweta Devi; translated and introduced by Samik Bandyopadhyay. Calcutta: Seagull Books.
- Mahāśvetā Debī & Banerjee, S. (1986). Five plays: Mother of 1084, aajir, bāyen, Urvashi and Johnny, water. Calcutta: Seagull Books.
- Mahāśvetā Debī & Banerjee, S. (1997). Five plays. Calcutta: Seagull Books.
- Mahāśvetā Debī & Banerjee, S. (1997). Mother of 1084. Calcutta: Seagull Books.
- Mahāśvetā Debī & Banerjee, S. (2004). Aajir. Twentieth-Century Drama Full-Text Database. Cambridge: ProQuest Information and Learning.
- Mahāśvetā Debī & Banerjee, S. (2004). Bayen. Twentieth-Century Drama Full-Text Database. Cambridge: ProQuest Information and Learning.
- Mahāśvetā Debī & Banerjee, S. (2004). Mother of 1084 (Hajar churashir ma). Twentieth-Century Drama Full-Text Database. Cambridge: ProQuest Information and Learning.
- Mahāśvetā Debī & Banerjee, S. (2004). Urvashi and Johnny (Urvashi o Johnny). Twentieth-Century Drama Full-Text Database. Cambridge: ProQuest Information and Learning.
- Mahāśvetā Debī & Banerjee, S. (2004). Water (jal). Twentieth-Century Drama Full-Text Database. Cambridge: ProQuest Information and Learning.
- Mitra, A., Devi, M., Bandyopadhyay, S. & Spivak, G. C. (1990). Juggling Fiends. Economic and Political Weekly. 25 (22), 1199.
- Mitra, S. & Bandyopadhyay, S. (1971). Building from Tagore. The Drama Review. 15 (2), 201–204.
- Mukherjee, C. & Banerjee, S. (1999). Shuvaprasanna: Vision : reality & beyond. New Delhi: Art Indus.
- Roy, K. S., Ray, S. & Bandyopadhyay, S. (1971). The Artist in Politics. From an Interview with Satyajit Ray in Kolkata [Calcutta], May 1970. The Drama Review. 15 (2), 310.
- Sen, M. (1983). In search of famine (Ākāler Sandhāney): A film. Calcutta: Seagull Books.
- Sen, M. & Bandyopadhyay, S. (1985). In search of famine: (Ākāler sandhāney) : a film. Calcutta: Seagull Books.
- Sen, M. & Banerjee, S. (2003). Over the years: An interview with Samik Bandyopadhyay. Calcutta: Seagull Books.
- Sircar, B. (1983). Three plays: Procession, Bhoma, Stale news. Calcutta: Seagull Books.
- Tendulkar, V. D. (2003). Collected plays in translation: Kamala, Silence! The court is in session, Sakharam Binder, The vultures, Encounter in Umbugland, Ghashiram Kotwal, A friend's story, Kanyadaan. New Delhi: Oxford University Press.
- Tendulkar, V. D. (2004). Collected plays in translation. Delhi: Oxford University Press.
- Tendulkar, V. D. & Adarkar, P. (2004). Kamala. Twentieth-Century Drama Full-Text Database. Cambridge [eng.]: Proquest LLC.
- Tendulkar, V. D. & Adarkar, P. (2004). Silence! The court is in session. Twentieth-Century Drama Full-Text Database. Cambridge [eng.]: Proquest LLC.
- Tendulkar, V. D., Banerjee, S., Karve, J. & Zelliot, E. (2002). Ghashiram Kotwal. Calcutta: Seagull Books.
- Tendulkar, V. D., Mehta, K. & Gokhale, S. (2004). Sakharam binder. Twentieth-Century Drama Full-Text Database. Cambridge [eng.]: Proquest LLC.
- Tendulkar, V. & Banerjee, S. (1984). Shyam Benegal's The churning: Manthana : screenplay. Calcutta: Seagull Books.
- Tendulkar, V. & Benegal, S. (1984). Shyam Benegal's The churning = Manthan. Calcutta: Seagull Books.
- Tendulkar, V., Karve, J. & Zelliot, E. (2004). Ghashiram kotwal. Twentieth-Century Drama Full-Text Database. Cambridge: ProQuest Information and Learning.
- Tendulkar, V., Mehta, K. & Gokhale, S. (2004). Sakharam binder. Twentieth-Century Drama Full-Text Database. Cambridge: ProQuest Information and Learning.
