= Hemant Mahaur =

Indian actor and actor trainer

- Born: Agra, Uttar Pradesh, India
- Education: Meerut University; National School of Drama
- Occupation: Actor

Hemant Mahaur is an Indian actor who works in Hindi films and theatre. He is the managing director of Mask Magic Film & TV Institute Privet Limited (MMFTI), and is an acting instructor, having trained several Bollywood actors. He attended India's National School of Drama.

== Personal life ==
Mahaur attended the National School of Drama in Delhi.

== Filmography ==
- Shool (1999)
- Jungle (2000) as Gangster
- The Warrior (2001) as
- Chot- Aj Isko, Kal Tereko (2004)
- Chintu Ji (2009) as Gyan
- Agent Vinod (2012) as Suresh Krishna
- Highway (2014) as Kasana
- The Goa Run (2014) as Vaas
- Phantom (2015) as Boatman in Karachi
- Yaara (2020) as Badrinath
- The Great Indian Murder (2022) as Billu Biryani
- Mandala Murders (2025) as Jayanand
- War 2 (2025) as Kali Head (Sri Lanka)

=== Short films ===
- Sadak Chhaap
- Jang Hamne Bhi Ladi Thi, Lekin
- Hotel 55
- Kabahun Na Chhaden Khet
- Part Time Job...

=== Screenwriting ===
- Mayanagari
