= Swami Vivekananda (1998 film) =

1998 Indian film by G. V. Iyer

- Promotional poster (1998)
- Directed by: G. V. Iyer
- Written by: G. V. Iyer
- Screenplay by: G. V. Iyer
- Story by: G. V. Iyer
- Based on: Life of Swami Vivekananda
- Produced by: T. Subbarami Reddy
- Starring: Sarvadaman D. Banerjee; Mithun Chakraborty; Debashree Roy; Jaya Prada; Shammi Kapoor; Shashi Kapoor; Mammootty; Raakhee
- Narrated by: Sarvadaman D. Banerjee
- Cinematography: Madhu Ambat
- Edited by: B. Lenin; V. T. Vijayan
- Music by: Songs: Salil Chowdhury; Background Score: Vijaya Bhaskar (Hindi); B. V. Karanth (English)
- Production company: Anantha Lakshmi Films
- Distributed by: Anantha Lakshmi Films
- Release date: 12 June 1998 (India)
- Running time: 240 minutes
- Country: India
- Languages: Hindi; English
- Budget: ₹30 million (US$320,000)
- Box office: ₹60 million (US$640,000)

Swami Vivekananda is a 1998 Indian biographical film directed by G. V. Iyer and produced by T. Subbarami Reddy. It took Iyer 11 years to finish the research work required for the film and to write the screenplay.

The film starred Sarvadaman D. Banerjee as Swami Vivekananda, the 19th-century Hindu monk, and Mithun Chakraborty as Ramakrishna, his guru. Even though the film was completed, ready to release in 1994 and was considered for 1995 national awards, the film got released on 12 June 1998. The film was premiered on India's public service broadcaster Doordarshan on 15 August 1998, the country's Independence Day.

The film received mainly negative reviews from critics. Mithun Chakraborty's acting in this film was widely appreciated, and he won his third National Film Award.

== Plot ==
The film mainly captures the events of Vivekananda's life from his birth to 1897, when he returned to India from the West. The film begins with the birth of Narendranath Datta (pre-monastic name of Swami Vivekananda) and shows the neighbours and relatives of Datta family celebrating the event. It immediately moves to the scene where Narendranath sees his father Vishwanath Datta is donating money, clothes, food to poor and distressed people. Seeing this, young Narendranath asks his father to give him something too, and his father tells him to go and look in a mirror and find what he had already given him. Following his father's suggestion, Narendranath goes to the room, sees his image in the mirror.

Different events of child Narendranath are shown one by one, such as his mother is melodiously reciting religious scriptures which leaves an impression on his young mind, Narendranath practising meditation, his mother is teaching him that experience is true knowledge, and his interest in studying a wide range of subjects.

Young Narendranath attends college, where he gets acquainted with European literature and contemporary social and religious movements. He also joins Brahmo Samaj. But there he finds that the leader, who is suggesting others to resist child marriage, is himself organising his minor daughter's marriage with a wealthy person. Narendranath goes to Debendranath Tagore and asks him if he has seen God. Tagore confesses that he did not have that experience, and also tells Narendranath that he had Yogi's eyes.

Narendranath meets Ramakrishna in a friend's house, where Narendranath sings a devotional song Bina Prem Dhiraj Nahi. Narendranath's song impresses Ramakrishna, who asks him to visit Dakshineswar Kali Temple, where Ramakrishna was based. Following Ramakrishna's invitation, Narendranath visits Dakshinewsar. The relation between Ramakrishna and Narendranath have been shown with great details. Narendranath initially rejects Ramakrishna, but gradually accepts him as his master. Ramakrishna teaches him the true meaning of religion and how one can find God.

After the death of Ramakrishna, Narendranath takes formal monastic vow, becomes a Sannyasi and a wandering monk. In Alwar, he meets Raja Mangal Singh, whom he tells Hindu's idol-worship is actually a symbolic form of worship.

In 1893, Vivekananda goes to Chicago to attend the Parliament of the World's Religions. There he gets tremendous success. The story of the film quickly moves to 1897, when Vivekananda returns to India. The film ends with a long English speech of Vivekananda in which he describes his ideals, objectives of Hinduism and prays for world-peace and fraternity.

== Credits ==
=== Cast ===
Mithun Chakraborty as Ramakrishna Paramahamsa. Chakraborty's portrayal of Ramakrishna was widely appreciated, and he won his third National Film Award.

- Sarvadaman D. Banerjee as Swami Vivekananda
- Pradeep Kumar as Vishwanath Datta, father of Vivekananda
- Tanuja as Bhuvaneswari Devi, mother of Vivekananda
- Mithun Chakraborty as Ramakrishna
- Debashree Roy as Sarada Devi
- Meenakshi Sheshadri as the young woman who desires to marry Narendranath Datta and later becomes Sannyasini
- Vijay Raghavendra as Shivarama
- Shobhana as Dancer

Guest appearances

- Mammootty as Maharaja
- Shammi Kapoor as Mangal Singh (King of Alwar)
- Shashi Kapoor as Rajasthani Husband
- Anupam Kher as Station Master
- Hema Malini as Goddess Bhavatarini/Dakhineshwari
- Jaya Prada as Court Dancer
- Raakhee as Rajasthani Tribal Woman
- Anant Mahadevan

== Production ==
=== Background ===
Since 1969 G. V. Iyer made several films on Hinduism and Hindu religious figures such as Adi Shankaracharya (1983), Madhavacharya (1986), Ramanujacharya (1989), and Bhagavad Gita (1993). The biopic on Swami Vivekananda was a film in this series, which Iyer and Subbarami Reddy (producer of the film) called their "celluloid tribute to the soul of India". This punch line was enough to elicit the attention of the public to watch the movie.

Unlike Iyer's previous films, Swami Vivekananda was a big-budget and big-banner film. Iyer started his studies and research work in 1986, and it took him 11 years to finish his research work and write the screenplay of the film. He commented— "The study of philosophy is the work of a lifetime and I would never want my films to be lacking."

=== Casting ===
Sarvadaman D. Banerjee played the role of Vivekananda in this film. Banerjee was a regular actor in Iyer's films and portrayed the role of Adi Shankara in his film Adi Shankaracharya (1983) too. Bengali film actor Mithun Chakraborty portrayed Ramakrishna's character. This was his first film with Iyer. After receiving "Lifetime achievement award" in 2012 Chakraborty told, he tried to follow the teachings of Swami Vivekananda throughout his acting career. Chakraborty cast in the role of Ramakrishna Paramahamsa, lends credence to the film by his sterling acting histrionics which earned him the accolade as an "intuitive and mysticalin a tour de force rendering". Debashree Roy was choiced to play Sarada Devi, the consort of Ramakrishna. Roy told in an interview that the acting in the film as Sarada Devi was a special blessing for her and she felt "strange emotions" during the shooting. Apart from the lead roles the film has a galaxy of famous stars in different small roles resulting in its production budget touching Rs 30 million. Hema Malini has acted in the role of overdressed Bhavatarini, Raakhee is cast as Rajasthani tribal woman, Jaya Prada is in a dancing girl role. Many famous male actors like Mammooty, Shammi Kapoor, Shashi Kapoor and Anupam Kher also have small roles.

== Soundtrack ==
Swami Vivekananda

Soundtrack album by Salil Chowdhury
- Genre: Film soundtrack
- Length: 40:25
- Label: His Master's Voice

The soundtracks of the film were composed by Salil Chowdhury, who died soon after the composing was completed. Most of the songs in the film were written by Gulzar. Songs written by Surdas, Kabir, Jayadeva were also used in this film. There was one Bengali song in the film— Nahi Surjo Nahi Jyoti— the song was written by Swami Vivekananda himself in 1897 when he was staying in Chennai (then known as Madras).

Swami Vivekananda movie Track listing
No.	Title	Lyrics	Singer(s)	Length
1.	"Chalo Man Jaye Ghar Apne" (Hindi; raga Ahir Bhairav)	Bengali lyrics: Swami Vivekananda; Translation to Hindi: Gulzar	K. J. Yesudas	4:44
2.	"Jaana Hai Jaana Hai Us Paar Maanjhi Re" (Hindi)	Gulzar	Antara Chowdhury	6:01
3.	"Nahi Surjo, Nahi Jyoti" (Bengali)	Swami Vivekananda	K. J. Yesudas	5:31
4.	"Sanyaasi Talaasi Jiski Hai" (Hindi)	Gulzar	Asha Bhonsle, K. J. Yesudas	4:47
5.	"Binaa Prem Dheeraj Nahi" (Hindi)	Srinivasa Rao	K. J. Yesudas	4:23
6.	"Prabhuji More Abgun Chit Na Dharo" (Hindi)	Surdas	Kavita Krishnamurthy	4:34
7.	"Re Man Krishna Naam Kahi Liije" (Hindi)	Surdas	Anup Jalota	6:01
8.	"Tava Birahe Vanamaali Sakhi" (Hindi)	Jaidev	Kavita Krishnamurthy	4:27
Total length:				40:25

== Controversies ==
The film's theme with complex overtones of religious and political implications generated controversy, even before the film was launched. T. Subbarami Reddy, the producer of the film, wanted to sign Naseeruddin Shah for the role of Ramakrishna, but they had to drop the idea when some Hindu nationalists of Maharashtra threatened them and warned that they would not allow the film if a Muslim actor portrays a Hindu Brahmin in the film. Then the film-makers approached Mithun Chakraborty, a Bengali Hindu Brahmin, who agreed to play the character.

Before the release of the film in 1998, Ramakrishna Math and Ramakrishna Mission monks alleged that Iyer had distorted the images of Vivekananda and his master Ramakrishna in this film and suggested that Iyer make a number of changes to the film. They alleged that certain scenes did not present an authentic portrayal, and had little or no similarity with actual events in the Swami's life. In addition, Swami Harshananda, then President of Ramakrihsna Math, Bangalore, asked the production house to delete their name from the title card since they were not associated with the film. Iyer accepted the suggestions of Ramakrishna Math and Mission authorities and made the requested changes in the film before the release. The Ramakrishna Mission's monks also objected to one song sequence as inappropriate, as it "showed Swamiji in poor light". As a result, the objectionable song sequence was deleted from the film.

According to a news report published in the Indian Express on 15 August 1998, Iyer made more or less 20 changes in the film. Later, Iyer said, he "surrendered" to the suggestions of the Ramakrishna Math and Mission authority. Subsequently, later in the month, it was cleared for public screening by the Delhi High Court.

Significantly, the character of Sister Nivedita, who played a crucial role in Vivekananda's life, was omitted in this film.

== Release ==
The film was released on 12 June 1998. The film was premiered on India's public service broadcaster Doordarshan on 15 August 1998 as a part of Doordarshan's celebration of 50th year of India's Independence.

== Reception ==
Though not in the same genre of films as those produced by Satyajit Ray or Shyam Benegal, the film is a typical Indian mythological. It has been appreciated for blending the role of "eccentric middle-aged mystic, nominally a Brahmin priest, claiming nothing short of godhood role" of Paramahmsa very well with that of the "young non-Brahmin agnostic modernist role" of Vivekananda.

The film received mixed and mainly negative reviews. S. Kalidas of India Today felt that the film had many "warts and weaknesses". He gave positive remarks for Mithun Chakraborty's acting and wrote— "(the film) is well worth watching for the sheer power of Mithun Chakraborty's performance as Vivekananda's mentor, Ramakrishna Paramhansa, if not for the moving message of its narrative." The reviewer said that Sarvadaman D. Banerjee played the role of Vivekananda with "quite competence."

Choodie Shivaram of Hinduism Today wrote in his review— "the film runs though like a school textbook without the trademark insightful Iyer interpretations." He found none of the actors' and actresses' acting impressive other than Mithun Chakraborty's. He widely appreciated Mithun Chakraborty's portrayal of Ramakrishna and commented— "The first half of the four-hour film was gripping, especially with Mithun's superlative portrayal of Ramakrisha. The one-time heart throb, disco dancer and martial arts fighter in the role of Ramakrishna held the audience spell bound."

== Awards ==
Mithun Chakraborty won his third National Film Award, this time for Best Supporting Actor category.
