= 1986–87 Karnataka State Film Awards =

Annual Indian film awards ceremony

The Karnataka State Film Awards 1986–87, presented by Government of Karnataka, to felicitate the best of Kannada Cinema released in the year 1986.

== Lifetime achievement award ==
From this year a new award namely Puttanna Kanagal Award is introduced to honor Kannada film directors.

Name of Award	Awardee(s)	Awarded As
• Puttanna Kanagal Award	• Hunsur Krishnamurthy	• Director

== Film awards ==
Name of Award	Film	Producer	Director
First Best Film	Tabarana Kathe	Girish Kasaravalli	Girish Kasaravalli
Second Best Film	Surya	Nataraj Bellary	Baraguru Ramachandrappa
Third Best Film	Madhvacharya	Ananthalakshmi Films	G. V. Iyer

== Other awards ==
Name of Award	Film	Awardee(s)
Best Direction	Tabarana Kathe	Girish Kasaravalli
Best Actor	Tabarana Kathe	Charuhasan
Best Actress	Aruna Raaga	Geetha
Best Supporting Actor	Aaganthuka	Devaraj
Best Supporting Actress	Anand	Jayanthi
Best Child Actor	Tabarana Kathe	Santhosh
Best Child Actor	Madhvacharya	Srivathsa
Best Cinematography	Surya	S. R. Bhat
Best Editing	Tabarana Kathe	M. N. Swamy
Best Sound Recording	Malaya Marutha	C. D. Vishwanath
Best Story Writer	Tabarana Kathe	K. P. Poornachandra Tejaswi
Best Screenplay	Anand	• Singeetam Srinivasa Rao • Chi. Udaya Shankar
Best Dialogue Writer	Tabarana Kathe	K. P. Poornachandra Tejaswi
Jury's Special Award		N. S. Rao (As Best Comedy Actor)
