= 40th National Film Awards =

National Film Awards (India)

- Awarded for: Best of Indian cinema in 1992
- Awarded by: Directorate of Film Festivals
- Presented by: Shankar Dayal Sharma (President of India)
- Announced on: 23 April 1993
- Presented on: 4 May 1993
- Official website: dff.nic.in

Highlights
- Best Feature Film: Bhagavad Gita
- Best Non-Feature Film: In Search of Indian Theatre
- Best Book: Awara
- Best Film Critic: Sudhir Bose
- Dadasaheb Phalke Award: Bhupen Hazarika
- Most awards: Thevar Magan (5)

The 40th National Film Awards, presented by Directorate of Film Festivals, the organisation set up by Ministry of Information and Broadcasting, India to felicitate the best of Indian Cinema released in the year 1992. Ceremony took place in 1993.

== Awards ==
Awards were divided into feature films, non-feature films and books written on Indian cinema.

=== Lifetime Achievement Award ===
Name of Award	Image	Awardee(s)	Awarded As	Awards
Dadasaheb Phalke Award		Bhupen Hazarika	Music director	Swarna Kamal, ₹ 100,000 and a Shawl

=== Feature films ===
Feature films were awarded at All India as well as regional level. For 40th National Film Awards, a Sanskrit film, Bhagavad Gita won the National Film Award for Best Feature Film and a Tamil film, Thevar Magan won the maximum number of awards (5). Following were the awards given in each category:

==== Juries ====
A committee headed by Balu Mahendra was appointed to evaluate the feature films awards. Following were the jury members:

- Jury Members
  - Balu Mahendra (Chairperson) • Sai Paranjpye • Swapan Kumar Ghosh • K. D. Shorey • Hema Mehta • T. S. Mohana • Bijaya Jena • V. K. Pavithran • Basu Chatterjee • Surinder Singh • Anil Saari • Sabyasachi Mohapatra • T. S. Nagabharana • Surjya Hazarika

==== All India Award ====
Following were the awards given:

===== Golden Lotus Award =====
Official Name: Swarna Kamal

All the awardees are awarded with 'Golden Lotus Award (Swarna Kamal)', a certificate and cash prize.

Name of Award	Name of Film	Language	Awardee(s)	Cash prize
Best Feature Film	Bhagavad Gita	Sanskrit	Producer: T. Subbarami Reddy	₹ 50,000/-
Best Feature Film	Bhagavad Gita	Sanskrit	director: G. V. Iyer	₹ 25,000/-
Best Feature Film	Citation: For successfully translating immortal philosophy of the Bhagavad Gita into a cinematic idiom.			
Best Direction	Padma Nadir Majhi	Bengali	Gautam Ghose	₹ 50,000/-
Best Direction	Citation: For his stunningly convincing realisation of Manik Bandopadhyay's novel into a breathtaking cinematic experience.			
Best Debut Film of a Director	Miss Beatty's Children	English	Producer: NFDC, Doordarshan and Rooks AV; Director: Pamela Rooks	₹ 25,000/- Each
Best Debut Film of a Director	Citation: For an elegantly simple and sensitive depiction of a British missionary woman who fights the devdasi system in pre-independent India.			
Best Popular Film Providing Wholesome Entertainment	Sargam	Malayalam	Producer: Bhavani	₹ 40,000/-
Best Popular Film Providing Wholesome Entertainment	Sargam	Malayalam	Director: Hariharan	₹ 20,000/-
Best Popular Film Providing Wholesome Entertainment	Citation: For its delightful rendering of a family saga into a heartwarming musical film.			
Best Children's Film	Mujhse Dosti Karoge	Hindi	Producer: National Center of Films for Children and Young People	₹ 30,000/-
Best Children's Film	Mujhse Dosti Karoge	Hindi	Director: Gopi Desai	₹ 15,000/-
Best Children's Film	Citation: For its gentle handling of a child who has exciting adventures in his own social dream world.			

===== Silver Lotus Award =====
Official Name: Rajat Kamal

All the awardees are awarded with 'Silver Lotus Award (Rajat Kamal)', a certificate and cash prize.

Name of Award	Awardee(s)	Name of Film	Language	Cash prize
Second Best Feature Film	Producer: Government of West Bengal	Padma Nadir Majhi	Bengali	₹ 30,000/-
Second Best Feature Film	Director: Gautam Ghose	Padma Nadir Majhi	Bengali	₹ 15,000/-
Second Best Feature Film	Citation: For depicting the plight of boat people of the river Padma in an unforgettable experience.			
Best Screenplay	M. T. Vasudevan Nair	Sadayam	Malayalam	₹ 10,000/-
Best Screenplay	Citation: For an extremely well structured script.			
Best Cinematography	Cameraman: Venu; Laboratory Processing: Prasad Film Laboratories	Miss Beatty's Children	English	₹ 15,000/-
Best Cinematography	Citation: For his masterly, unobtrusive and technically excellent camera work.			
Best Audiography	N. Pandurangan	Thevar Magan	Tamil	₹ 10,000/-
Best Audiography	Citation: For his extremely creative recording and mixing of the sound track, giving the film an added dimension.			
Best Editing	M. S. Mani	Sargam	Malayalam	₹ 10,000/-
Best Editing	Citation: For imparting a natural rhythm to Sargam completely in time with its musical format.			
Best Art Direction	Samir Chanda	Rudaali	Hindi	₹ 10,000/-
Best Art Direction	Citation: For its realistic recreation of the desert scape, with its requisite architectural structures, both opulent and humble.			
Best Music Direction	A. R. Rahman	Roja	Tamil	₹ 10,000/-
Best Music Direction	Citation: For the harmonious blend of western and Karnatak classical music in Roja, the separate music systems complementing each other without losing their own identities.			
Best Costume Design	• Mala Dey • Simple Kapadia	Rudaali	Hindi	₹ 10,000/-
Best Costume Design	Citation: For the authentic designs they created to blend with the desert backdrop of Rajasthan.			
Best Actor	Mithun Chakraborty	Tahader Katha	Bengali	₹ 10,000/-
Best Actor	Citation: For his innovative performance which effectively captures the agony of a freedom fighter immediately after Independence.			
Best Actress	Dimple Kapadia	Rudaali	Hindi	₹ 10,000/-
Best Actress	Citation: For compelling interpretation of the tribulations of a lonely woman ravaged by a cruel society.			
Best Supporting Actor	Sunny Deol	Damini	Hindi	₹ 10,000/-
Best Supporting Actor	Citation: For his outstanding portrayal of hardened and cynical lawyer who takes on new challenges in his quest for justice.			
Best Supporting Actress	Revathi	Thevar Magan	Tamil	₹ 10,000/-
Best Supporting Actress	Citation: For compelling and convincing performance of an innocent village girl, giving it an effortlessly charming naturalness.			
Best Child Artist	Amit Phalke	Mujhse Dosti Karoge	Hindi	₹ 5,000/-
Best Child Artist	Citation: For the sheer joy and versatility he brings to the portrayal of a lovable lad lost in his own dream world.			
Best Male Playback Singer	Rajkumar	Jeevana Chaitra ("Naadamaya Ee Lokavella")	Kannada	₹ 10,000/-
Best Male Playback Singer	Citation: For his extraordinary rendering of a raga celebrating the all pervasive power of music.			
Best Female Playback Singer	S. Janaki	Thevar Magan ("Inji Idupazhagi")	Tamil	₹ 10,000/-
Best Female Playback Singer	Citation: For melodious rendering of an innocent love song.			
Best Lyrics	Vairamuthu	Roja ("Chinna Chinna Aasai")	Tamil	₹ 10,000/-
Best Lyrics	Citation: For his charming, simple poem which has been become a new nursery rhyme on the lips of every child in Tamil Nadu.			
Best Special Effects	Shashilal K. Nair	Angaar	Hindi	₹ 10,000/-
Best Special Effects	Citation: For his absolutely convincing miniature work.			
Best Choreography	Laxmibai Kolhapurkar	Ek Hota Vidushak	Marathi	₹ 10,000/-
Best Choreography	Citation: For successfully adapting a popular folk theatre form to the screen.			
Best Feature Film on National Integration	Producer: Kavithalayaa Productions	Roja	Tamil	₹ 30,000/-
Best Feature Film on National Integration	Director: Mani Ratnam	Roja	Tamil	₹ 15,000/-
Best Feature Film on National Integration	Citation: For presenting a thrilling drama of the abduction of an Indian scientist by a self-proclaimed liberation army which later realises the futility of its anti-social activities.			
Best Film on Family Welfare	Producer: Shankar Gope	Shwet Paatharer Thala	Bengali	₹ 30,000/-
Best Film on Family Welfare	Director: Prabhat Roy	Shwet Paatharer Thala	Bengali	₹ 15,000/-
Best Film on Family Welfare	Citation: For its bold depiction of a widow who defies tradition.			
Best Film on Other Social Issues	Producer: G. V. Films Pvt. Ltd	Neenga Nalla Irukkanum	Tamil	₹ 30,000/-
Best Film on Other Social Issues	Director: Visu	Neenga Nalla Irukkanum	Tamil	₹ 15,000/-
Best Film on Other Social Issues	Citation: For its effective and purposeful plea for prohibition.			
Best Film on Environment / Conservation / Preservation	Producer: Sadir Media Pvt. Ltd	Cheluvi	Hindi	₹ 30,000/-
Best Film on Environment / Conservation / Preservation	Director: Girish Karnad	Cheluvi	Hindi	₹ 15,000/-
Best Film on Environment / Conservation / Preservation	Citation: For its direct and effective communication of a threatening problem – deforestation.			
Special Jury Award	Sivaji Ganeshan (Actor)	Thevar Magan	Tamil	₹ 5,000/- Each
Special Jury Award	Ketan Mehta (Director)	Maya Memsaab	Hindi	₹ 5,000/- Each
Special Mention	Sibaprasad Sen (Director)	Pasanda Pandit	Bengali	Certificate Only
Special Mention	Citation: For his refreshing directorial debut.			

==== Regional Awards ====
The award is given to best film in the regional languages in India.

Name of Award	Name of Film	Awardee(s)	Cash prize
Best Feature Film in Assamese	Railor Alir Dubori Ban	Producer: Pulak Gogoi	₹ 20,000/-
Best Feature Film in Assamese	Railor Alir Dubori Ban	Director: Pulak Gogoi	₹ 10,000/-
Best Feature Film in Assamese	Citation: For its innovative style in putting across the tragedy of the exploited poor and portraying their agony and helplessness in a poignant manner.		
Best Feature Film in Bengali	Tahader Katha	Producer: NFDC	₹ 20,000/-
Best Feature Film in Bengali	Tahader Katha	Director: Buddhadeb Dasgupta	₹ 10,000/-
Best Feature Film in Bengali	Citation: For its most unusual and daring treatment of a very real socio-political issue in a metaphoric manner – the alienation of a freedom fighter from his country, now changed beyond recognition.		
Best Feature Film in Hindi	Suraj Ka Satvan Ghoda	Producer: NFDC	₹ 20,000/-
Best Feature Film in Hindi	Suraj Ka Satvan Ghoda	Director: Shyam Benegal	₹ 10,000/-
Best Feature Film in Hindi	Citation: For its poetically charming enquiry into the nature and meaning of love.		
Best Feature Film in Kannada	Harakeya Kuri	Producer: B. V. Radha	₹ 20,000/-
Best Feature Film in Kannada	Harakeya Kuri	Director: Lalitha Ravee (K. S. L. Swame)	₹ 10,000/-
Best Feature Film in Kannada	Citation: For its political satire depicting the present-day social situation wherein the innocent citizens are made pawns in the hands of politicians with vested interests.		
Best Feature Film in Malayalam	Swaroopam	Producer: P. T. K. Mohammed	₹ 20,000/-
Best Feature Film in Malayalam	Swaroopam	Director: K. R. Mohanan	₹ 10,000/-
Best Feature Film in Malayalam	Citation: For its original concept and in-depth exploration of the psyche of a man who escapes into the mystic past to flee from the harsh reality of everyday life.		
Best Feature Film in Marathi	Ek Hota Vidushak	Producer: NFDC	₹ 20,000/-
Best Feature Film in Marathi	Ek Hota Vidushak	Director: Jabbar Patel	₹ 10,000/-
Best Feature Film in Marathi	Citation: For its humane portrait of simple tamash clown sucked in by the glittering world of show business and exploited by politicians.		
Best Feature Film in Oriya	Vinya Samaya	Producer: Shankar Gope	₹ 20,000/-
Best Feature Film in Oriya	Vinya Samaya	Director: Manmohan Mahapatra	₹ 10,000/-
Best Feature Film in Oriya	Citation: For its competent treatment of the corruption of modern youth in search of illusive wealth.		
Best Feature Film in Tamil	Thevar Magan	Producer: Kamal Haasan	₹ 20,000/-
Best Feature Film in Tamil	Thevar Magan	Director: Bharathan	₹ 10,000/-
Best Feature Film in Tamil	Citation: For its dynamic depiction of an educated youth who returns to his roots to fight injustice and in the process is forced to unleash the animal within him.		
Best Feature Film in Telugu	Ankuram	Producer: K. V. Suresh Kumar	₹ 20,000/-
Best Feature Film in Telugu	Ankuram	Director: C. Umamaheswara Rao	₹ 10,000/-
Best Feature Film in Telugu	Citation: For the struggle of a simple housewife who fights an oppressive system single-handed and succeeds in making a dent.		

Best Feature Film in Each of the Language Other Than Those Specified in the Schedule VIII of the Constitution

Name of Award	Name of Film	Awardee(s)	Cash prize
Best Feature Film in English	Electric Moon	Producer: S. S. Bedi	₹ 20,000/-
Best Feature Film in English	Electric Moon	Director: Pradip Krishen	₹ 10,000/-
Best Feature Film in English	Citation: For its tongue-in-cheek parody of royalty gone to seed. A humorous depiction of a decaying way of life, not without its tragic undertones.		

=== Non-Feature Films ===
Short Films made in any Indian language and certified by the Central Board of Film Certification as a documentary/newsreel/fiction are eligible for non-feature film section.

==== Juries ====
A committee headed by Ghanashyam Mohapatra was appointed to evaluate the non-feature films awards. Following were the jury members:

- Jury Members
  - Ghanashyam Mohapatra (Chairperson) • Serbjeet Singh • P. B. Pendharkar • Lenin Rajendran

==== Golden Lotus Award ====
Official Name: Swarna Kamal

All the awardees are awarded with 'Golden Lotus Award (Swarna Kamal)', a certificate and cash prize.

Name of Award	Name of Film	Language	Awardee(s)	Cash prize
Best Non-Feature Film	In Search of Indian Theatre	English	Producer: Arundhati Chatterjee; Director: Abhijit Chattopadhyay	₹ 15,000/- Each
Best Non-Feature Film	Citation: For a deep and sensitive insight into contemporary Indian theatre.			

==== Silver Lotus Award ====
Official Name: Rajat Kamal

All the awardees are awarded with 'Silver Lotus Award (Rajat Kamal)' and cash prize.

Name of Award	Name of Film	Language	Awardee(s)	Cash prize
Best First Non-Feature Film	Knock-Out	Tamil	Producer: B. Lenin; Director: B. Lenin	₹ 10,000/- Each
Best First Non-Feature Film	Citation: The director has given us a powerful insight into the labyrinth of the human mind faced with a disaster situation.			
Best Anthropological / Ethnographic Film	Wangala – A Garo Festival	English	Producer: Bappa Ray; Director: Bappa Ray	₹ 10,000/- Each
Best Anthropological / Ethnographic Film	Citation: For competently presenting the life of lifestyle of Garo community of Meghalaya.			
Best Biographical Film	Pandit Bhimsen Joshi	Hindi	Producer: Gulzar for Films Division; Director: Gulzar	₹ 10,000/- Each
Best Biographical Film	Citation: For a moving rendering of the life of great master of ragas.			
Best Arts / Cultural Film	The Recluse	Hindi	Producer: Arvind Sinha; Director: Arvind Sinha	₹ 10,000/- Each
Best Arts / Cultural Film	Citation: For a fine and moving tribute to one of the great living master of Dhrupad – Ustad Amiruddin Dagar.			₹ 10,000/- Each
Best Arts / Cultural Film	Suchitra Mitra	Bengali	Producer: Sailen Seth; Director: Raja Sen	₹ 10,000/- Each
Best Arts / Cultural Film	Citation: For a cinematic tribute to the greatest living exponent of Rabindra Sangeet.			₹ 10,000/- Each
Best Scientific Film	Chunauti	Marathi	Producer: D. G. Information and Public Relations, Government of Maharashtra; Director: Dinkar Chowdhary	₹ 10,000/- Each
Best Scientific Film	Citation: For its daring presentation in a befitting manner of the most dangerous disease of present times – AIDS.			
Best Environment / Conservation / Preservation Film	Ladhakh – The Forbidden Wilderness	English	Producer: Bedi Films; Director: Naresh Bedi	₹ 10,000/- Each
Best Environment / Conservation / Preservation Film	Citation: For an authentic rendition of civilisation and wildlife on the roof of the world.			
Best Promotional Film	Sound of the Dying Colors	English	Producer: Paran Barbarooah, B. B. Productions; Director: Sher Choudhury	₹ 10,000/- Each
Best Promotional Film	Citation: For the film makes out a good case for preserving the arts of dyeing that have existed in many tribal communities for centuries.			
Best Agricultural Film	Ber	English	Producer: Om Prakash Sharma for Films Division; Director: Rajgopal Rao	₹ 10,000/- Each
Best Agricultural Film	Citation: For a skilful rendition of the process in the cultivation of ber in the arid zones of India.			
Best Film on Social Issues	Choodiyan	Hindi	Producer: Sai Paranjpye for Films Division; Director: Sai Paranjpye	₹ 10,000/- Each
Best Film on Social Issues	Citation: For portraying the courage of women in fighting alcoholism among the menfolk of the community.			
Best Educational / Motivational / Instructional Film	Kalarippayat	English	Producer: P. Ashok Kumar; Director: P. Ashok Kumar	₹ 10,000/- Each
Best Educational / Motivational / Instructional Film	Citation: For a unique picturisation of the martial art of Kerala.			₹ 10,000/- Each
Best Educational / Motivational / Instructional Film	Towards Joy and Freedom	English	Producer: Haimanti Banerjee; Director: Haimanti Banerjee	₹ 10,000/- Each
Best Educational / Motivational / Instructional Film	Citation: For insight into the system of education being practised at Rabindranath Tagore's Shantiniketan.			₹ 10,000/- Each
Best Exploration / Adventure Film	Antarctica – A Scientists' Paradise	English	Producer: R. Krishna Mohan for Films Division; Director: A. Udayashankar	₹ 10,000/- Each
Best Exploration / Adventure Film	Citation: For an impressive pictorial record of achievements of our scientists on the frozen continent of Antarctica.			
Best Investigative Film	Ram ke Naam	Hindi	Producer: Anand Patwardhan; Director: Anand Patwardhan	₹ 10,000/- Each
Best Investigative Film	Citation: For a skilfully made film on a major problem of the times – the communal divide.			
Best Animation Film	Gaaye Ki Sachai	Hindi	Producer: Climb Films and N'CYP; Director: Bhimsain; Animator: Bhimsain	₹ 10,000/- Each
Best Animation Film	Citation: For an allegorical story skilfully told about moral values.			₹ 10,000/- Each
Best Animation Film	The Threads	English	Producer: B. R. Shendge for Films Division; Director: Girish Rao; Animator: Girish Rao	₹ 10,000/- Each
Best Animation Film	Citation: For an innovative film on the theme of unity.			₹ 10,000/- Each
Best Short Fiction Film	Agar Aap Chahein	Hindi	Producer: Shahnaz Rahim for Films Division; Director: Mazahir Rahim	₹ 10,000/- Each
Best Short Fiction Film	Citation: For a moving story of a village community which has been saved from migration to a city by timely help from a bank for agricultural development.			
Best Film on Family Welfare	Suno Bahu Rani	Hindi	Producer: Om Prakash Sharma for Films Division; Director: K. K. Kapil	₹ 10,000/- Each
Best Film on Family Welfare	Citation: For a deftly made film with the aid of puppets on the theme of family welfare.			
Best Cinematography	Sucitra Mitra	Bengali	Cameraman: Soumendu Roy; Laboratory Processing: Adlabs	₹ 10,000/- Each
Best Cinematography	Citation: For capturing on celluloid the many moods of the Bengal landscape and picturisation of the famous singer Suchitra Mitra.			
Best Audiography	Wangala – A Garo Festival	English	Sanjoy Chatterjee	₹ 10,000/-
Best Audiography	Citation: For a sustained standard of sound recording on difficult locations which enriches the quality of the film.			
Best Editing	Kalarippayat	English	K. R. Bose	₹ 10,000/-
Best Editing	Citation: For deft cutting of difficult sequence which makes it possible to maintain the rhythm and tempo of the film.			
Special Jury Award	Noottantinte Sakshi	Malayalam	• Salam Karassery (Producer) • Sasibhushan (Director)	₹ 10,000/-
Special Jury Award	Citation: For a moving narrative about the courageous Maulvi patriot and centenarian Moidu Maulvi of Calicut, Kerala.			

=== Best Writing on Cinema ===
The awards aim at encouraging study and appreciation of cinema as an art form and dissemination of information and critical appreciation of this art-form through publication of books, articles, reviews etc.

==== Juries ====
A committee headed by Mrinal Pande was appointed to evaluate the writing on Indian cinema. Following were the jury members:

- Jury Members
  - Mrinal Pande (Chairperson) • Gautaman Bhaskaran • Shirshendu Mukhopadhyay

==== Golden Lotus Award ====
Official Name: Swarna Kamal

All the awardees are awarded with 'Golden Lotus Award (Swarna Kamal)' and cash prize.

Name of Award	Name of Book	Language	Awardee(s)	Cash prize
Best Book on Cinema	Awara	English	Author: Gayatri Chatterjee; Publisher: Wiley Eastern Ltd	₹ 10,000/- Each
Best Book on Cinema	Citation: Her work is a novel experiment, which analyses the film in depth both at a personal and at a social level. What emerges is a clear reflection of the socio-economic fabric of a newly independent India. The book can be rightly termed an extension of Raj Kapoor's artistic sensibilities.			
Best Film Critic		Bengali	Sudhir Bose	₹ 10,000/-
Best Film Critic	Citation: His writings go beyond newspaper or magazine journalism. His courage of conviction helps him to reflect most authentically the regional and ethnic sensitibilies of cinema across globe. Whether it be Indian cinema or Hungarian or even American, Mr. Bose's articles portray a rare kind of perception.			

=== Awards not given ===
Following were the awards not given as no film was found to be suitable for the award:

- Best Feature Film in Manipuri
- Best Feature Film in Punjabi
- Best Historical Reconstruction / Compilation Film
