= 31st National Film Awards (India) =

National Film Awards (India)

- Awarded for: Best of Indian cinema in 1983
- Awarded by: Directorate of Film Festivals
- Presented by: Indira Gandhi (Prime Minister of India)
- Presented on: June 1984
- Official website: dff.nic.in

Highlights
- Best Feature Film: Adi Shankaracharya
- Best Book: Cinemayude Lokam
- Dadasaheb Phalke Award: Durga Khote
- Most awards: Adi Shankaracharya (4)

The 31st National Film Awards, presented by Directorate of Film Festivals, the organisation set up by Ministry of Information and Broadcasting, India to felicitate the best of Indian Cinema released in the year 1983. Ceremony took place in June 1984 and awards were given by then Prime Minister of India, Indira Gandhi.

== Juries ==
Three different committees were formed for feature films, short films and books on cinema, headed by veteran director K. Balachander, S. Krishnaswamy and Justice G. D. Khosla respectively.

- Jury Members: Feature Films
  - K. Balachander (Chairperson) • Sai Paranjpye • M. T. Vasudevan Nair • Gangadhar Naskar • Meera Lakhia • Raghunath Seth • Madhu • Swapan Mullick • Iqbal Masud • Mrinalini Sarabhai • M. K. Binodini Devi • M. Prabhakar Reddy • K. K. Shukla • G. G. Mayekar • Marcus Bartley • Gautam Kaul • Raghava Menon • Jamuna
- Jury Members: Short Films
  - S. Krishnaswamy (Chairperson) • Clement Baptista • Prakash Jha • Vinod Mehra
- Jury Members: Books on Cinema
  - G. D. Khosla (Chairperson) • Vivek Bhattacharya • O. M. Anujan • Sukumar Dutta • V. K. Madhavan Kutty • Arun Khanna

== Awards ==
Awards were divided into feature films, non-feature films and books written on Indian cinema.

=== Lifetime Achievement Award ===
Name of Award	Image	Awardee(s)	Awarded As	Awards
Dadasaheb Phalke Award		Durga Khote	Actor and Film producer	Swarna Kamal, ₹40,000 and a Shawl

=== Feature films ===
Feature films were awarded at All India as well as regional level. For 31st National Film Awards, a Sanskrit film, Adi Shankaracharya won the National Film Award for Best Feature Film also winning the maximum number of awards (four). Following were the awards given in each category:

==== All India Award ====
Following were the awards given:

Name of Award	Name of Film	Language	Awardee(s)	Cash prize
Best Feature Film	Adi Shankaracharya	Sanskrit	Producer: NFDC	Swarna Kamal and ₹50,000/-
Best Feature Film	Adi Shankaracharya	Sanskrit	director: G. V. Iyer	Swarna Kamal and ₹25,000/-
Best Feature Film	Citation: For its dedication, depth and power and the impressive skill with which it captures the Indian philosophical tradition.			
Second Best Feature Film	Maya Miriga	Oriya	Producer: NFDC	Rajat Kamal and ₹30,000/-
Second Best Feature Film	Maya Miriga	Oriya	Director: Nirad N. Mohapatra	Rajat Kamal and ₹15,000/-
Second Best Feature Film	Citation: For the sensitivity and compassion with which it depicts an aspect of middle class reality and its restrained and intelligent observation of people.			
Best Feature Film on National Integration	Sookha	Hindi	Producer: M. S. Sathyu	Rajat Kamal and ₹30,000/-
Best Feature Film on National Integration	Sookha	Hindi	Director: M. S. Sathyu	Rajat Kamal and ₹15,000/-
Best Feature Film on National Integration	Citation: For its sincerity in the portrayal of basic human values that unify mankind.			
Best Children's Film	Bhombal Sardar	Bengali	Producer: Government of West Bengal	Swarna Kamal and ₹20,000/-
Best Children's Film	Bhombal Sardar	Bengali	Director: Nripen Ganguly	Rajat Kamal and ₹20,000/-
Best Children's Film	Citation: For its lively and lyrical description of a world seen through the eyes of a boy.			
Best Debut Film of a Director	Jaane Bhi Do Yaaro	Hindi	Producer: NFDC; Director: Kundan Shah	Rajat Kamal and ₹10,000/-
Best Debut Film of a Director	Citation: For its treatment of contemporary theme with wit and humour.			
Best Direction	Khandhar	Hindi	Mrinal Sen	Rajat Kamal only
Best Direction	Citation: For its subtle blending of nostalgia and contemporary social comment and the powerful visual exploration of the theme.			
Best Screenplay	Adi Shankaracharya	Sanskrit	G. V. Iyer	Rajat Kamal and ₹10,000/-
Best Screenplay	Citation: For its rich texture, lyricism and cinematic elegance in its presentation of Shankaracharya as an embodiment of greatness.			
Best Actor	Ardh Satya	Hindi	Om Puri	Rajat Kamal and ₹10,000/-
Best Actor	Citation: For his authentic portrayal of the inner conflicts of a conscientious police officer.			
Best Actress	Khandhar	Hindi	Shabana Azmi	Rajat Kamal and ₹10,000/-
Best Actress	Citation: For the sensitivity with which she captures the tragic loneliness of the character of Jamini.			
Best Child Artist	Malamukalile Daivam	Malayalam	Master Suresh	Rajat Kamal and ₹5,000/-
Best Child Artist	Citation: For lively depiction of a wide range of emotions of a tribal lad.			
Best Cinematography (Color)	Adi Shankaracharya	Sanskrit	Madhu Ambat	Rajat Kamal and ₹10,000/-
Best Cinematography (Color)	Citation: For succeeding in capturing visually the spirit of the theme.			
Best Cinematography (Black and White)	Neeraba Jhada	Oriya	• B. Bindhani • Raj Shekhar	Rajat Kamal and ₹10,000/-
Best Cinematography (Black and White)	Citation: For recording the stark realities of rural life in austere images.			
Best Audiography	Adi Shankaracharya	Sanskrit	S. P. Ramanathan	Rajat Kamal and ₹10,000/-
Best Audiography	Citation: For the deft handling of the sound track to blend with the film's mood.			
Best Editing	Khandhar	Hindi	Mrinmoy Chakraborty	Rajat Kamal and ₹10,000/-
Best Editing	Citation: For his work which gives the film its structure, rhythm and brooding quality.			
Best Art Direction	Mandi	Hindi	Nitish Roy	Rajat Kamal and ₹10,000/-
Best Art Direction	Citation: For the inventive creation of a backdrop which admirably complemented the varying moods of the film.			
Best Music Direction	Saagara Sangamam	Telugu	Ilaiyaraaja	Rajat Kamal and ₹10,000/-
Best Music Direction	Citation: For his lively, rich and vigorous recreation of traditional music composition and inventive musical ideas adapted to the visual demands of drama.			
Best Male Playback Singer	Saagara Sangamam	Telugu	S. P. Balasubrahmanyam	Rajat Kamal and ₹10,000/-
Best Male Playback Singer	Citation: For his resonant and technically rich rendering of musical forms to enhance dramatic impact.			
Best Female Playback Singer	M. L. A. Yedukondalu ("Yendho Beeda Vaade Gopaludu")	Telugu	P. Susheela	Rajat Kamal and ₹10,000/-
Best Female Playback Singer	Citation: For her fine flight of voice in the endearing of Gopal's magical childhood in the song "Gopaludu" from the film.			
Special Jury Award	Nokkukuthi	Malayalam	Mankada Ravi Varma	Rajat Kamal and ₹5,000/-
Special Jury Award	Citation: For successfully using a unique idiom to recreate a folk legend through dance and poetry.			
Special Mention	Tarang	Hindi	Kumar Shahani	Certificate Only

==== Regional Award ====
The awards were given to the best films made in the regional languages of India. For feature films in English, Gujarati, Kashmiri and Punjabi language, award for Best Feature Film was not given.

Name of Award	Name of Film	Awardee(s)	Awards
Best Feature Film in Assamese	Alokar Ahban	Producer: Do-Re-Me Films	Rajat Kamal and ₹15,000/-
Best Feature Film in Assamese	Alokar Ahban	Director: Kamal Hazarika	Rajat Kamal and ₹7,500/-
Best Feature Film in Assamese	Citation: For a realistic presentation of the theme of rural co-operatives in the handloom industry of Assam.		
Best Feature Film in Bengali	Vasundhra	Producer: Sanjukta Films	Rajat Kamal and ₹15,000/-
Best Feature Film in Bengali	Vasundhra	Director: Sekhar Chatterjee	Rajat Kamal and ₹7,500/-
Best Feature Film in Bengali	Citation: For its sincere attempt to depict the struggle against social injustice.		
Best Feature Film in Hindi	Ardh Satya	Producer: Manmohan Shetty and Pradeep Uppoor	Rajat Kamal and ₹15,000/-
Best Feature Film in Hindi	Ardh Satya	Director: Govind Nihalani	Rajat Kamal and ₹7,500/-
Best Feature Film in Hindi	Citation: For its powerful exploration of a labyrinthine socio-political situation.		
Best Feature Film in Kannada	Banker Margayya	Producer: T. S. Narasimhan and B. S. Somasundar	Rajat Kamal and ₹15,000/-
Best Feature Film in Kannada	Banker Margayya	Director: T. S. Nagabharana	Rajat Kamal and ₹7,500/-
Best Feature Film in Kannada	Citation: For a faithful and effective rendering of a classic Indian novel into the medium of cinema.		
Best Feature Film in Malayalam	Malamukalile Daivam	Producer: Surya Mudra Films	Rajat Kamal and ₹15,000/-
Best Feature Film in Malayalam	Malamukalile Daivam	Director: P. N. Menon	Rajat Kamal and ₹7,500/-
Best Feature Film in Malayalam	Citation: For the courageous effort to present the cause of tribals and their efforts to join the national mainstream.		
Best Feature Film in Manipuri	Sanakeithel	Producer: Th. Doren	Rajat Kamal and ₹15,000/-
Best Feature Film in Manipuri	Sanakeithel	Director: M. A. Singh	Rajat Kamal and ₹7,500/-
Best Feature Film in Manipuri	Citation: For the sympathetic portrayal of a human relationship in the context of a social tragedy.		
Best Feature Film in Marathi	Smruti Chitre	Producer: Vinayak Chaskar	Rajat Kamal and ₹15,000/-
Best Feature Film in Marathi	Smruti Chitre	Director: Vijaya Mehta	Rajat Kamal and ₹7,500/-
Best Feature Film in Marathi	Citation: For its compassionate portrayal of an early woman writer and its compelling study of a tormented soul coming to terms with her social condition.		
Best Feature Film in Oriya	Neeraba Jhada	Producer: Manmohan Mahapatra	Rajat Kamal and ₹15,000/-
Best Feature Film in Oriya	Neeraba Jhada	Director: Manmohan Mahapatra	Rajat Kamal and ₹7,500/-
Best Feature Film in Oriya	Citation: For sensitive narration of the looming tragedy of an uprooted rural community.		
Best Feature Film in Tamil	Oru Indhiya Kanavu	Producer: T. P. Varadarajan and Vijayalakshmi Desikan	Rajat Kamal and ₹15,000/-
Best Feature Film in Tamil	Oru Indhiya Kanavu	Director: Komal Swaminathan	Rajat Kamal and ₹7,500/-
Best Feature Film in Tamil	Citation: For its honesty of purpose to articulate the cause of tribal welfare.		
Best Feature Film in Telugu	Rangula Kala	Producer: K. Venkateswara Rao	Rajat Kamal and ₹15,000/-
Best Feature Film in Telugu	Rangula Kala	Director: B. Narsing Rao	Rajat Kamal and ₹7,500/-
Best Feature Film in Telugu	Citation: For a vivid portrayal of urban life as seen by a sensitive painter in search of his identification with the masses.		

=== Non-Feature films ===
Following were the awards given:

Name of Award	Name of Film	Language	Awardee(s)	Cash prize
Best Information Film	The Procession	English	Producer: Aurora Films Corporation; Director: Anjan Bose	Rajat Kamal and ₹5,000/- Each
Best Information Film	Citation: For portraying the innocence of the Indian villager and making a political comment, with telling images of evocative sensitivity that needs no words.			
Best Educational / Instructional Film	Oval Crop	English	Producer: Radha Narayanan; Director: Mohi-ud-Din Mirza	Rajat Kamal and ₹5,000/- Each
Best Educational / Instructional Film	Citation: For its qualities of technical excellence combined with the precision of content so vital to making an instructional film which sustains the interests of an audience even with its mundane subject matter.			
Best Promotional Film	Ekta Aur Anushasan	Hindi	Producer: K. S. Kulkarni; Director: S. K. Sharma	Rajat Kamal and ₹5,000/- Each
Best Promotional Film	Citation: For its exuberant youthful energy, bringing forth of a sense of pride in the National Cadet Corps, with an enthusiasm for National Integration without falling into cliches.			
Best Experimental Film	The Clown and The Dog	Hindi	Producer: Film and Television Institute of India; Director: Sunny Joseph	Rajat Kamal and ₹5,000/- Each
Best Experimental Film	Citation: For its attempt to unfold the intellectual yearnings of youth for freedom if thought and action, interpreted in a brilliantly photographed stylised form.			
Best Animation Film	Fire Games	English	Producer: Ranabir Ray; Director: Ram Mohan; Animator: Naik Satam and Bapu Parulekar	Rajat Kamal and ₹5,000/- Each
Best Animation Film	Citation: For a highly professional standard of animation conceived and executed with great finesse.			
Best Animation Film	A Race With Death	English	Producer: B. R. Shedge; Director: Yash Choudhary; Animator: V. G. Samant and V. K. Wankhede	Rajat Kamal and ₹5,000/- Each
Best Animation Film	Citation: For using media of animation with much skill for easy communication to any audience group – rural or urban.			
Best Newsreel Cameraman	Tragedy of Gendi (Indian News Review No. 1799)	English	C. Ramani, Uday Shankar and S. L. Prasad	Rajat Kamal and ₹5,000/-
Best Newsreel Cameraman	Citation: For their well planned team work (in Indian News Review No. 1799) covering the scientific, technical, ceremonious and human aspects of a great event of national importance recording sensitive emotions of expectation and fulfilment during the launching of SLV-3.			
Best News Film	Shelter	English	Film and Television Institute of India	Rajat Kamal and ₹5,000/-
Best News Film	Citation: For its brave and sympathetic visual coverage and journalistic report of a controversial issue affecting the lives of the pavement dwellers of Mumbai.			
Special Mention	Jalshakti	Hindi	Producer: National Institute of Design; Director: I. S. Mathur	Certificate only
Special Mention	Thalam	Malayalam	Producer: Kerala State Film Development Corporation; Director: Joy Mathew	Certificate only
Special Mention	Energy-Merry-Go-Round	English	Producer: National Institute of Design	Certificate only
Special Mention	Veer Savarkar (Biographical Film)	Marathi		Certificate only
Special Mention	Handling Fuel Oils Fission Power 306 Rejuvenation (Scientific Film)	English		Certificate only
Special Mention	Against Current Exploration Antartica (Exploration Film)	English		Certificate only
Special Mention	• Cobra – The Snake God • Perumkaliattam • Leather Puppetry of Karnataka • Nishan (Anthropological/Ethnographic Film)	• English • Malayalam • English • Hindi		Certificate only
Special Mention	Two Men and an Ideal (Historical Reconstruction Film)	English		Certificate only
Special Mention	• Tambaccucha Samna • Bidaai (Social Welfare)	• Marathi • Hindi		Certificate only

=== Best Writing on Cinema ===
Following were the awards given:

Name of Award	Name of Book	Language	Awardee(s)	Cash prize
Best Book on Cinema	Cinemayude Lokam	Malayalam	Author: Adoor Gopalakrishnan	Rajat Kamal and ₹5,000/-

=== Awards not given ===
Following were the awards not given as no film was found to be suitable for the award:

- Best Film on Family Welfare
- Best Lyrics
- Best Popular Film Providing Wholesome Entertainment
- Best Film on Social Documentation
- Best Non-Feature Film on Family Welfare
- Best Feature Film in English
- Best Feature Film in Punjabi
