= T. Subbarami Reddy =

Indian politician

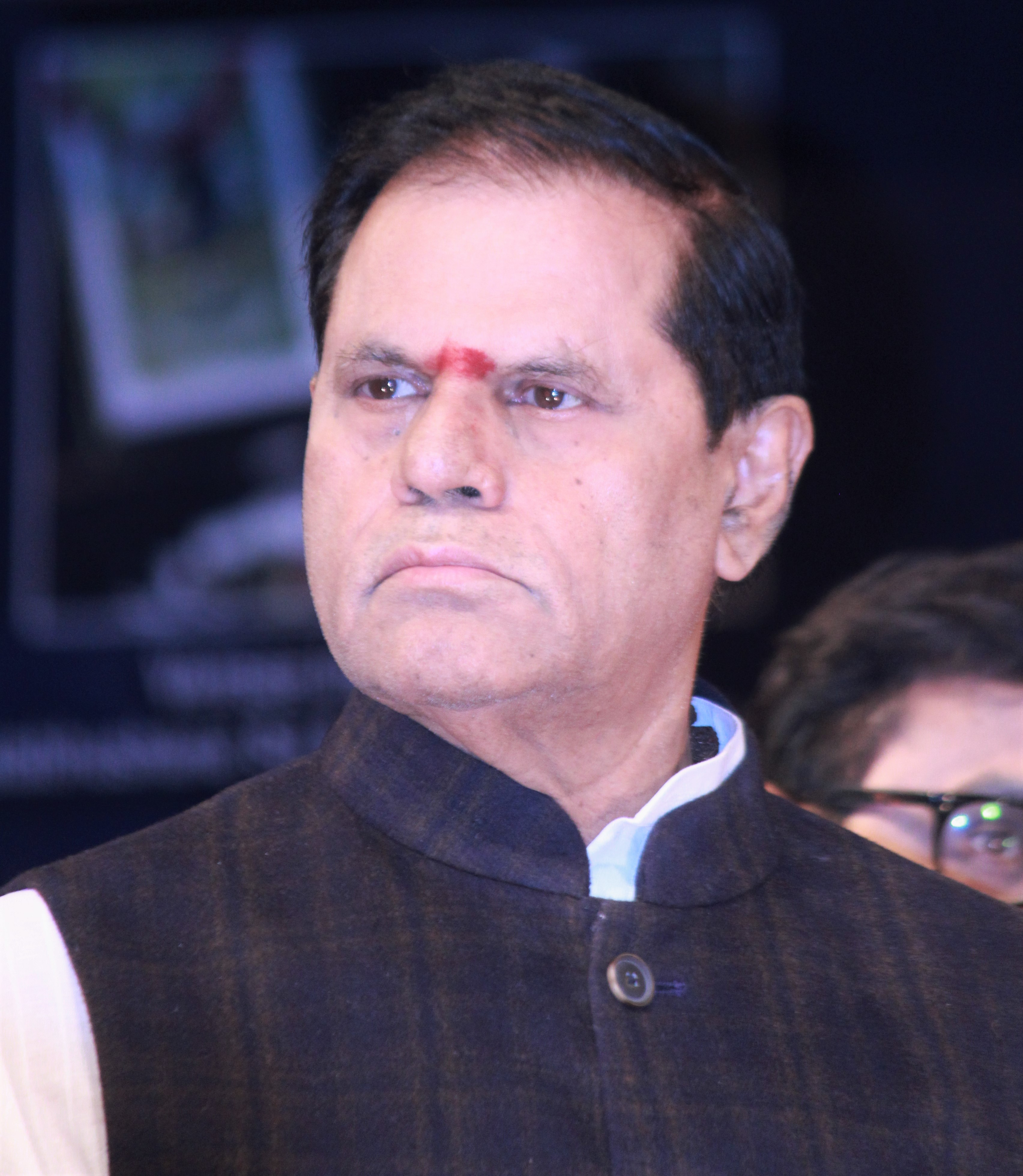

Minister of State for Mines Government of India
- In office 7 February 2006 – 6 April 2008
- Prime Minister: Manmohan Singh
- Minister: Sis Ram Ola

Member of Parliament, Rajya Sabha
- In office 10 April 2002 – 09 April 2020
- Constituency: Andhra Pradesh

Member of Parliament, Lok Sabha
- In office 10 May 1996 – 26 April 1999
- Preceded by: M. V. V. S. Murthi
- Succeeded by: M. V. V. S. Murthi
- Constituency: Visakhapatnam

Personal details
- Born: 17 September 1943 (age 83) Nellore, Madras Presidency, India
- Party: Indian National Congress
- Children: Sandeep Reddy & Pinky Reddy
- Relatives: T. Ramana Reddy; (uncle); T. Pattabhirama Reddy (cousin)
- Occupation: Politician; Industrialist; Producer; Philanthropist

Thikkavarapu Subbarami Reddy (born 17 September 1943) is an Indian industrialist, politician, film producer, and a philanthropist. In 1993 he produced the Sanskrit film Bhagavad Gita, which garnered the National Film Award for Best Feature Film at the 40th National Film Awards.

He is a member of the Indian National Congress. He was Member of the Parliament of India representing Andhra Pradesh in the Rajya Sabha, the upper house of the Indian Parliament and Lok Sabha, the lower house since 1996. He was elected to 11th and 12th Lok Sabha twice in 1996 and 1998 from Visakhapatnam constituency. He was elected as Rajya Sabha member in 2002 and continued in the position for the third term.

He was member of various parliamentary committees. He was also Minister of State in the Ministry of Mines between 2006 and 2008. On 15 June 2012, he lost the election for Nellore constituency to Mekapati Rajamohan Reddy.

== Personal life ==
He was born to T. Babu Reddy and Rukmini Amma at Nellore, Andhra Pradesh. He did B.Sc. in physics from Nizam College, Hyderabad. His uncle is T. Ramana Reddy. He is also related to filmmaker T. Pattabhirama Reddy.

His wife T. Indira Subbarami Reddy is the chairperson of Gayatri Projects Ltd, the company founded by him. He has two children Pinky Reddy and Sandeep Reddy. Pinky Reddy is married to G. V.Sanjay Reddy, the son of Gunapati Venkata Krishna Reddy, founder and chairman of GVK Group. They have a son, Keshav Reddy, and daughter, Mallika Reddy.

== Industrialist ==
He received a gold medal by the then Prime Minister of India, Indira Gandhi, for his contribution in the construction of the then world's biggest dam Nagarjuna Sagar Project in Andhra Pradesh in 1967. Reddy was the mud contractor for this dam.

He was Chairman of Tirumala Tirupati Devasthanam Board (T.T.D.) since 2004, National Panorama Festival Committee in 1992, National Film Award Jury in 1994 and 1997, Andhra Pradesh Cultural Federation in 1994 and Member of Central Film Censor Board, 1983–85.The National Company Law Tribunal approved a rupees 2400 crores one time settlement proposed by Gayathri Projects, founded by T.Subburami Reddy. This was paid in lieu of a total unpaid dues of rupees 8100 crores. The net loss to a consortium of nine banks is rupees 5700 crores.

== Election History ==
=== Rajya Sabha ===
Position	Party	Constituency	From	To	Tenure
Member of Parliament, Rajya Sabha (1st Term)	INC	Andhra Pradesh	10 April 2002	9 April 2008	5 years, 365 days
Member of Parliament, Rajya Sabha (2nd Term)	INC	Andhra Pradesh	10 April 2008	9 April 2014	5 years, 364 days
Member of Parliament, Rajya Sabha (3rd Term)	INC	Andhra Pradesh	10 April 2014	9 April 2020	5 years, 365 days

== Selected filmography ==
He has produced a handful of films in Hindi and Telugu languages.

Sanskrit

- Bhagavad Gita (1993)

Hindi

- Dilwaala (1986)
- Chandni (1989)
- Lamhe (1991)
- Swami Vivekananda (1998)

Telugu

- Jeevana Poratam (1986)
- Trimurtulu (1988)
- State Rowdy (1989)
- Surya IPS (1991)
- Gangmaster (1994)
- Velugu Needalu (1999)
- Vamshoddharakudu (2000)

== Awards ==
National Film Awards

- National Film Award for Best Feature Film (producer) - Bhagavad Gita (1993)

Other honors

- Kala Samrat by Maharashtra Government in 1988
- Kala Ratna by Lt. Governor, Delhi in 1989
- Kala tapaswi by Telugu Academy in 1993
- Honorary doctorate by Mangalore University in recognition of social work
- Life Time Achievement Award by American Telugu Association in 2002

Awards in his honor

- T. Subbarami Reddy Award for contribution to Telugu cinema

== See also ==
- Rajya Sabha members from Andhra Pradesh
