= G. V. Iyer =

Indian filmmaker (1917–2003)

Ganapathi Venkatramana Iyer
- Born: 3 September 1917; Nanjanagud, Mysore State, British India
- Died: 21 December 2003 (aged 86); Mumbai, Maharashtra, India
- Occupations: Actor, film director, screenwriter
- Known for: Sanskrit film direction
- Notable work: Adi Shankaracharya (1983); Bhagavad Gita (1993); Swami Vivekananda (1998); Madhvacharya (1987)

Ganapathi Venkataramana Iyer (3 September 1917 – 21 December 2003) was an Indian film director and actor. He was nicknamed "Kannada Chitra Bheeshma". His film Adi Shankaracharya (1983) won four National Film Award, including Best Film, Best Screenplay, Best Cinematography and Best Audiography. His film Swami Vivekananda (1998) was nominated in the Best Film category at the Bogotá Film Festival, for which Mithun Chakraborty won the national award for Best Supporting Actor.

== Early life ==
He was born in 1917 in a Tamil brahmin family in Nanjangud of Mysore district.

== Career ==
He started his career at the age of eight when he joined the Gubbi Veeranna theatre group. His first role as an actor in cinema was in the film Radha Ramana. Besides this he acted in a number of other movies such as Mahakavi Kalidasa, Sodhari, Hemavati, Hari Bhaktha and Bedara Kannapa. He is credited with providing breaks to two of the greatest Kannada actors, Dr. Rajkumar and Narasimha Raju in the movie Bedara Kannappa. Though Raj Kumar had acted in a single scene in a movie previously, the movie Bedara Kannappa where Mr Iyer cast him as the hero, is where he got his break and is regarded generally as his first movie. Iyer also produced the critically acclaimed movie Vamsha Vriksha. Based on an acclaimed novel by S L Bhairappa, it was jointly directed by B V Karanth and Girish Karnad.

He soon started directing his own movies. The movie Hamsageethe (music by Dr. Balamuralikrishna, B. V. Karanth and T.G. Lingappa) was well received and made him famous. Iyer wrote scripts, lyrics and produced and directed many commercial Kannada movies. Iyer's biggest effort was Ranadheera Kanteerava. He continued to make commercial movies until 1970.

In his younger days, he was committed to Gandhi and his ideals. He stopped wearing footwear from the day Gandhi died and never wore them again. He also wore hand-spun clothes colloquially called "Khadi" as was advocated by Gandhi.

He was proficient in both Kannada and Sanskrit and was soon to make the first movie in Sanskrit, about the famous philosopher Adi Shankaracharya (1983). The movie received the National Film Awards for Best Film, Best Screenplay, Best Cinematography and Audiography. It is believed that the movie made a great impact on Iyer.

He later made a film on Madhvacharya in Kannada and Ramanujacharya in Tamil. He also made a remarkable Sanskrit movie Bhagavad Gita (1993), which won Best Film at the National Film Awards of 1993. The film was also nominated for Best Film at the Bogotá Film Festival.

He produced Natyarani Shanthala, a historical television series on the Hoysala Jain queen Shanthala, who was married to a Vaishnava King. It was re-made in Hindi as well as in Kannada. It was based on several works by Samethanahalli Rama Rao in Kannada.

He later went on to make a movie Swami Vivekananda. It was an attempt to portray Swami Vivekananda, realistically. For this film Mithun Chakraborty won a national award for Best Supporting Actor. Mithun Chakraborty played Shri Ramkrishna Paramhansa. Though it had many famous actors such as Mithun Chakraborty, Hema Malini and Sarvadaman Banerjee, the movie failed commercially.

Iyer's final projects included the Kannada film Sri Krishnaleele (2003) and a 13-episode television series on Krishna in Tamil, Malayalam and Hindi languages, both of which completed filming by August 2001. Sri Krishnaleele was based on Purandara Dasa's kirtans, which included 38 of his poems and 40 songs.

He was planning a film based on the Hindu epic Ramayana, with Sanjay Dutt playing the role of Ravana, before his sudden death on 21 December 2003 at the age of 87. His last rites took place at his Bharadhwaja Ashrama, near Dodda Aladamara, on the outskirts of Bangalore, near Kengeri.

== Filmography ==
=== Director, Writer and producer ===
Year	Film	Credited as			Language	Notes
Year	Film	Director	Writer	Producer	Language	Notes
1954	Bedara Kannapa		✓	✓	Kannada	
1960	Ranadheera Kanteerava		✓	✓	Kannada	
1962	Bhoodana	✓	✓	✓	Kannada	
1962	Thai Karulu	✓			Kannada	
1962	Thayin Karuna	✓			Kannada	
1962	Gaali Gopura		✓		Kannada	Lyrics only
1963	Bangari	✓	✓	✓	Kannada	
1963	Saaku Magalu		✓		Kannada	Dialogues only
1963	Lawyer Magalu	✓	✓	✓	Kannada	
1964	Post Master	✓	✓	✓	Kannada	
1965	Pazhani		✓		Tamil	Original story
1966	Kiladi Ranga	✓	✓	✓	Kannada	
1967	Rajashekara	✓	✓	✓	Kannada	
1967	Gange Gowri		✓		Kannada	Dialogues only
1968	Mysore Tanga	✓	✓		Kannada	
1968	Nane Bhagyavathi	✓			Kannada	
1969	Chowkada Deepa	✓			Kannada	
1969	Vichitra Samsara	✓			Kannada	
1975	Aakhri Geet	✓			Kannada	
1975	Hamsageethe	✓	✓	✓	Kannada	
1977	Nalegalannu Maduvavaru	✓			Kannada	
1977	Kudre Motte	✓			Kannada	
1983	Adi Shankaracharya	✓	✓		Sanskrit	Madhu Ambat won national award for Best Cinematography.
1986	Madhvacharya	✓	✓		Kannada	
1989	Ramanujacharya	✓			Tamil	
1989	Wall Poster	✓			Kannada	
1993	Bhagvad Gita: Song of the Lord	✓	✓		Sanskrit	
1998	Swami Vivekananda	✓	✓		Hindi	Mithun Chakraborty won national award for Best Supporting Actor.
2001	Sri Krishna Leela	✓	✓		Kannada	Unreleased

=== Actor ===
- Radha Ramana (1943)
- Bedara Kannappa (1954)
- Sodari (1955)
- Bhakta Mallikarjuna (1955)
- Sadarame (1956)
- Jagajyothi Basveshwara (1959)
- Ranadheera Kanteerava (1960)
- Kantheredu Nodu (1961)
- Bhoodana (1962)
- Vamsha Vriksha (1971)
- Hemavathi (1977)

== Awards ==
- 1983: National Film Award
  - Best Film: Adi Shankaracharya
  - Best Screenplay: Adi Shankaracharya
- 1993: National Film Award
  - Best Film: Bhagavad Gita
- 1993: Bhagavad Gita – nominated for Best Film at the Bogotá Film Festival in Golden Precolumbian Circle.
  - Filmfare Award for Best Director – Kannada: Hamsa Geethe- 1976
  - Filmfare Award for Best Film – Kannada: Vamsha Vriksha- 1972

== See also ==
- List of Indian film directors
