= National Film Award for Best Screenplay =

Indian film award

- National award for contributions to Indian Cinema
- Awarded for: Best screenplay for a feature film for a year
- Sponsored by: National Film Development Corporation of India
- Rewards: Rajat Kamal (Silver Lotus); ₹2,00,000
- First award: 1967 (Original screenplay); 2009 (Adapted screenplay and Dialogue)
- Most recent winner: Sukumar, Yogesh Deshpande and Venky Atluri (2024)

The National Film Award for Best Screenplay is one of the categories in the National Film Awards presented annually by the National Film Development Corporation of India. It is one of several awards presented for feature films and awarded with Rajat Kamal (Silver Lotus). The award is announced for films produced in a year across the country, in all Indian languages. As of 2024, the award comprises a Rajat Kamal, a certificate, and a cash prize of ₹2,00,000.

The National Film Awards were established in 1954 to "encourage production of the films of a high aesthetic and technical standard and educational and culture value" and also planned to include awards for regional films. The awards were instituted as the "State Awards for Films" but were renamed to "National Film Awards" at the 15th National Film Awards in 1967 and a new category of award for Best Screenplay was introduced, presented with a plaque and a cash prize. At the 57th National Film Awards in 2009, the Screenplay award was reclassified into three different awards: Screenplay Writer (Original), Screenplay Writer (Adapted), and Dialogues. Although the Indian film industry produces films in around twenty languages and dialects, as of 2022 edition, the seventy-three unique writers who have been awarded, have worked in nine major languages: Hindi (twenty awards), Malayalam (twelve awards), Bengali (eleven awards), Tamil and Marathi (nine awards) respectively, Telugu (six awards), Kannada (five awards), English (two awards), Sanskrit and Assamese (one award each).

The inaugural award, in 1967, of this category was presented to S. L. Puram Sadanandan for the Malayalam film Agniputhri. No award was presented at the 23rd National Film Awards (1975). As of 2016, Malayalam author and screenplay writer M. T. Vasudevan Nair holds the record of winning maximum awards in category with four wins for the films: Oru Vadakkan Veeragadha (1989), Kadavu (1991), Sadayam (1992), and Parinayam (1994). Bengali filmmaker Satyajit Ray was presented the award in 1993 posthumously for the film Uttoran; he had earlier received awards for Pratidwandi (1970) and Sonar Kella (1974). At the 59th National Film Awards in 2011, Girish Kulkarni was awarded both the Best Actor and Best Dialogue Awards for the Marathi film Deool. The film was itself was adjudged the Best Feature Film. In 2015 at the 63rd ceremony, the awards for both Original Screenplay and Dialogue were jointly presented to Juhi Chaturvedi and Himanshu Sharma for their films Piku and Tanu Weds Manu: Returns, respectively.

As of 2022, sixty-nine awards have been presented for Original Screenplay writing, eighteen for Adapted Screenplay writing, and fourteen for dialogue.

== Award ==
The first recipient of the award, S. L. Puram Sadanandan, was presented with a plaque and ₹ 5000 cash prize. The award was revised in 1973 at the 21st ceremony to include ₹ 10,000 cash, a silver medal and a certificate. It was shared by Mrinal Sen and Ashish Burman for their Bengali film Padatik. At the 54th awarding ceremony in 2006, the next revision of the award was declared to include cash remuneration of ₹50,000 which was presented to Abhijat Joshi, Rajkumar Hirani and Vidhu Vinod Chopra for their Hindi film Lage Raho Munna Bhai in which Mahatma Gandhi's philosophy of non-violence was depicted. At the 70th National Film Awards (2022), the cash prize was revised to ₹2,00,000.

For fourteen times, multiple writers were awarded for their work in a single film; Mrinal Sen and Ashish Burman for Padatik (1973), Satyadev Dubey, Shyam Benegal, and Girish Karnad for Bhumika (1977), T. S. Ranga and T. S. Nagabharana for Grahana (1978), Ashok Mishra and Saeed Akhtar Mirza for Naseem (1995), Manoj Tyagi and Nina Arora for Page 3 (2004), Prakash Jha, Shridhar Raghavan, and Manoj Tyagi for Apaharan (2005), Abhijat Joshi, Rajkumar Hirani, and Vidhu Vinod Chopra for Lage Raho Munna Bhai (2006), Gopal Krishan Pai and Girish Kasaravalli for Kanasemba Kudureyaneri (2009), P. F. Mathews and Harikrishna for Kutty Srank (2009), Anant Mahadevan and Sanjay Pawar for Mee Sindhutai Sapkal (2010), Vikas Bahl, Nitesh Tiwari, and Vijay Maurya for Chillar Party (2011), Bhavesh Mandalia and Umesh Shukla for OMG – Oh My God! (2012), Sriram Raghavan, Arijit Biswas, Yogesh Chandekar, Hemanth Rao, Pooja Ladha Surti for Andhadhun (2018), Sudha Kongara and Shalini Ushadevi for Soorarai Pottru (2020).

Shyamoli Banerjee Deb, one of the jury members at the 53rd National Film Awards, filed a petition objecting to the selections in five awards categories; the Best Feature Film in Hindi, the Best First Film of a Director, the Best Actress, the Best Screenplay, and the Best Special Effects. Deb challenged the decision to confer the award to Prakash Jha, Shridhar Raghavan, and Manoj Tyagi for the Hindi film Apaharan and claimed that the film was not in the primary selection list. The Delhi High Court put a stay on the announcement and requested a reply from the Directorate of Film Festivals. Fourteen months later, Justice B. D. Ahmed removed the stay and the award was announced for Apaharan.

== Winners ==
Following are the award winners over the years:

Awards legends
Screenplay Writer (Original)
Screenplay Writer (Adapted)
Dialogue

List of award recipients, showing the year (award ceremony), film(s) and language(s)
Year	Recipient(s)	Film(s)	Language(s)	Refs.
1967 (15th)	S. L. Puram Sadanandan	Agniputhri	Malayalam	
1968 (16th)	Pandit Anand Kumar	Anokhi Raat	Hindi	
1969 (17th)	Puttanna Kanagal	Gejje Pooje	Kannada	
1970 (18th)	Satyajit Ray	Pratidwandi	Bengali	
1971 (19th)	Tapan Sinha	Ekhonee	Bengali	
1972 (20th)	Gulzar	Koshish	Hindi	
1973 (21st)	Mrinal Sen	Padatik	Bengali	
1973 (21st)	Ashish Burman	Padatik	Bengali	
1974 (22nd)	Satyajit Ray	Sonar Kella	Bengali	
1975 (23rd)	No Award			
1976 (24th)	Vijay Tendulkar	Manthan	Hindi	
1977 (25th)	Satyadev Dubey	Bhumika	Hindi	
1977 (25th)	Shyam Benegal	Bhumika	Hindi	
1977 (25th)	Girish Karnad	Bhumika	Hindi	
1978 (26th)	T. S. Ranga	Grahana	Kannada	
1978 (26th)	T. S. Nagabharana	Grahana	Kannada	
1979 (27th)	Sai Paranjpye	Sparsh	Hindi	
1980 (28th)	Mrinal Sen	Akaler Sandhane	Bengali	
1981 (29th)	K. Balachander	Thanneer Thanneer	Tamil	
1982 (30th)	Mrinal Sen	Kharij	Bengali	
1983 (31st)	G. V. Iyer	Adi Shankaracharya	Sanskrit	
1984 (32nd)	Adoor Gopalakrishnan	Mukhamukham	Malayalam	
1985 (33rd)	Bhabendra Nath Saikia	Agnisnaan	Assamese	
1986 (34th)	Buddhadeb Dasgupta	Phera	Bengali	
1987 (35th)	Adoor Gopalakrishnan	Anantaram	Malayalam	
1988 (36th)	Arundhati Roy	In Which Annie Gives It Those Ones	English	
1989 (37th)	M. T. Vasudevan Nair	Oru Vadakkan Veeragatha	Malayalam	
1990 (38th)	K. S. Sethumadhavan	Marupakkam	Tamil	
1991 (39th)	M. T. Vasudevan Nair	Kadavu	Malayalam	
1992 (40th)	M. T. Vasudevan Nair	Sadayam	Malayalam	
1993 (41st)	Satyajit Ray (Posthumously)	Uttoran	Bengali	
1994 (42nd)	M. T. Vasudevan Nair	Parinayam	Malayalam	
1995 (43rd)	Ashok Mishra	Naseem	Hindi	
1995 (43rd)	Saeed Akhtar Mirza	Naseem	Hindi	
1996 (44th)	Agathiyan	Kadhal Kottai	Tamil	
1997 (45th)	Rituparno Ghosh	Dahan	Bengali	
1998 (46th)	Ashok Mishra	Samar	Hindi	
1999 (47th)	Madampu Kunjukuttan	Karunam	Malayalam	
2000 (48th)	Bharathiraja	Kadal Pookkal	Tamil	
2001 (49th)	G. Neelakanta Reddy	Show	Telugu	
2002 (50th)	Aparna Sen	Mr. and Mrs. Iyer	English	
2003 (51st)	Gautam Ghose	Abar Aranye	Bengali	
2004 (52nd)	Manoj Tyagi	Page 3	Hindi	
2004 (52nd)	Nina Arora	Page 3	Hindi	
2005 (53rd)	Prakash Jha	Apaharan	Hindi	
2005 (53rd)	Shridhar Raghavan	Apaharan	Hindi	
2005 (53rd)	Manoj Tyagi	Apaharan	Hindi	
2006 (54th)	Abhijat Joshi	Lage Raho Munnabhai	Hindi	
2006 (54th)	Rajkumar Hirani	Lage Raho Munnabhai	Hindi	
2006 (54th)	Vidhu Vinod Chopra	Lage Raho Munnabhai	Hindi	
2007 (55th)	Feroz Abbas Khan	Gandhi, My Father	Hindi	
2008 (56th)	Sachin Kundalkar	Gandha	Marathi	
2009 (57th)	P. F. Mathews	Kutty Srank	Malayalam	
2009 (57th)	Harikrishna	Kutty Srank	Malayalam	
2009 (57th)	Gopalakrishna Pai	Kanasemba Kudureyaneri	Kannada	
2009 (57th)	Girish Kasaravalli	Kanasemba Kudureyaneri	Kannada	
2009 (57th)	Pandiraj	Pasanga	Tamil	
2010 (58th)	Vetrimaaran	Aadukalam	Tamil	
2010 (58th)	Anant Mahadevan	Mee Sindhutai Sapkal	Marathi	
2010 (58th)	Sanjay Pawar	Mee Sindhutai Sapkal	Marathi	
2010 (58th)	Sanjay Pawar	Mee Sindhutai Sapkal	Marathi	
2011 (59th)	Vikas Bahl	Chillar Party	Hindi	
2011 (59th)	Nitesh Tiwari	Chillar Party	Hindi	
2011 (59th)	Vijay Maurya	Chillar Party	Hindi	
2011 (59th)	Avinash Deshpande Nigdi	Shala	Marathi	
2011 (59th)	Girish Kulkarni	Deool	Marathi	
2012 (60th)	Sujoy Ghosh	Kahaani	Hindi	
2012 (60th)	Bhavesh Mandalia	OMG - Oh My God!	Hindi	
2012 (60th)	Umesh Shukla	OMG - Oh My God!	Hindi	
2012 (60th)	Anjali Menon	Ustad Hotel	Malayalam	
2013 (61st)	P. Sheshadri	December-1	Kannada	
2013 (61st)	Panchakshari	Prakruti	Kannada	
2013 (61st)	Sumitra Bhave	Astu	Marathi	
2014 (62nd)	Srijit Mukherji	Chotushkone	Bengali	
2014 (62nd)	Joshy Mangalath	Ottaal	Malayalam	
2014 (62nd)	Vishal Bhardwaj	Haider	Hindi	
2015 (63rd)	Juhi Chaturvedi	Piku	Hindi	
2015 (63rd)	Himanshu Sharma	Tanu Weds Manu Returns	Hindi	
2015 (63rd)	Vishal Bhardwaj	Talvar	Hindi	
2016 (64th)	Syam Pushkaran	Maheshinte Prathikaaram	Malayalam	
2016 (64th)	Sanjay Krishnaji Patil	Dashakriya	Marathi	
2016 (64th)	Tharun Bhascker Dhaassyam	Pelli Choopulu	Telugu	
2017 (65th)	Sajeev Pazhoor	Thondimuthalum Driksakshiyum	Malayalam	
2017 (65th)	Jayaraj	Bhayanakam	Malayalam	
2017 (65th)	Sambit Mohanty (posthumously)	Hello Arsi	Oriya	
2018 (66th)	Rahul Ravindran	Chi La Sow	Telugu	
2018 (66th)	Sriram Raghavan	Andhadhun	Hindi	
2018 (66th)	Arijit Biswas	Andhadhun	Hindi	
2018 (66th)	Yogesh Chedekar	Andhadhun	Hindi	
2018 (66th)	Hemanth Rao	Andhadhun	Hindi	
2018 (66th)	Pooja Ladha Surti	Andhadhun	Hindi	
2018 (66th)	Churni Ganguly	Tarikh	Bengali	
2019 (67th)	Kaushik Ganguly	Jyeshthoputro	Bengali	
2019 (67th)	Srijit Mukherji	Gumnaami	Bengali	
2019 (67th)	Vivek Ranjan Agnihotri	The Tashkent Files	Hindi	
2020 (68th)	Sudha Kongara	Soorarai Pottru	Tamil	
2020 (68th)	Shalini Ushadevi	Soorarai Pottru	Tamil	
2020 (68th)	Madonne Ashwin	Mandela	Tamil	
2021 (69th)	Shahi Kabir	Nayattu	Malayalam	
2021 (69th)	Sanjay Leela Bhansali	Gangubai Kathiawadi	Hindi	
2021 (69th)	Utkarshini Vashishtha	Gangubai Kathiawadi	Hindi	
2021 (69th)	Prakash Kapadia	Gangubai Kathiawadi	Hindi	
2022 (70th)	Anand Ekarshi	Aattam	Malayalam	
2022 (70th)	Arpita Mukherjee	Gulmohar	Hindi	
2022 (70th)	Rahul V. Chittella	Gulmohar	Hindi	
2023 (71st)	Sai Rajesh	Baby	Telugu	
2023 (71st)	Ramkumar Balakrishnan	Parking	Tamil	
2023 (71st)	Deepak Kingrani	Sirf Ek Bandaa Kaafi Hai	Hindi	
2024 (72nd)	Sukumar	Pushpa 2: The Rule	Telugu	
2024 (72nd)	Yogesh Deshpande	Swargandharva Sudhir Phadke	Marathi	
2024 (72nd)	Venky Atluri	Lucky Baskhar	Telugu	
