= Adi Shankaracharya (film) =

- Poster
- Directed by: G. V. Iyer
- Written by: Padmasri Dr. Bannanje Govindacharya
- Screenplay by: G. V. Iyer
- Based on: Life of Adi Shankaracharya
- Produced by: National Film Development Corporation of India
- Starring: Sarvadaman Banerjee; Srinivas Prabhu; Bharat Bhushan; M.V. Narayana Rao
- Cinematography: Madhu Ambat
- Music by: M. Balamurali Krishna
- Release date: 1983
- Running time: 160 minutes
- Country: India
- Language: Sanskrit

Adi Shankaracharya is a 1983 Sanskrit-language Indian film directed by G. V. Iyer. The film depicts the life and times of the Hindu scholar Adi Shankaracharya, who consolidated the doctrine of Advaita Vedanta (nondualism) in Hindu philosophy. The movie is an example of experimental movie era of Kannada film industry. It was the first film in India to be made in Sanskrit. At the 31st National Film Awards, it won four awards, including Best Film, Best Screenplay, Best Cinematography and Best Audiography.

After Adi Shankaracharya, Iyer directed Madhvacharya in 1986 and Ramanujacharya in 1989.

== Cast ==
- Sarvadaman D. Banerjee as Adi Shankaracharya
- Srinivas Prabhu as Prajnaana
- T. S. Nagabharana as Mrithyu
- Bharat Bhushan as Kaippilly Shivaguru Nambudiri, Adi Shankara's father
- Manjunath Bhat as Padmapada
- Gopal as Thotaka
- V.R.K. Prasad as Hasthamalaka
- M.V. Narayana Rao as Sureshwara
- Gopinath Das as Govinda Bhagavathpada
- L.V. Sharada Rao as Kaippilly Aryadevi Antarjanam ("Aryamba"), Adi Shankara's mother
- Leela Narayana Rao as Ubhaya Bharathi
- Sreepathy Ballal as Kumarila Bhatta
- G. V. Iyer as Veda Vyasa
- Gopi as young Shankara
- Radhakrishna as baby Shankara
- Raghu Iyer as young Pranjana
- Vijay Bharan as young Mrithyu
- G.V.Shivanand as Guru
- Gopalakrishna as Nambudiri
- Mallesh as Kapalika
- Murgod as Chandala
- Manohar as Mama
- G.S.Natraj as Vishnu
- Ajay as Sathyakama
- Mahesh Swamy as Boudha Guru
- Purushotham as Boudha Bhikshu
- Balu as Chiushka
- Girish as Vidyananda
- Veena Kamal as Jabali

== Awards ==
- 1983: National Film Award
  - Best Film: G V Iyer
  - Best Screenplay: G V Iyer
  - Best Cinematography (Colour): Madhu Ambatt
  - Best Audiography: S.P. Ramanathan
