= National Film Awards =

State-instituted annual film awards in India

- Current: 72nd National Film Awards
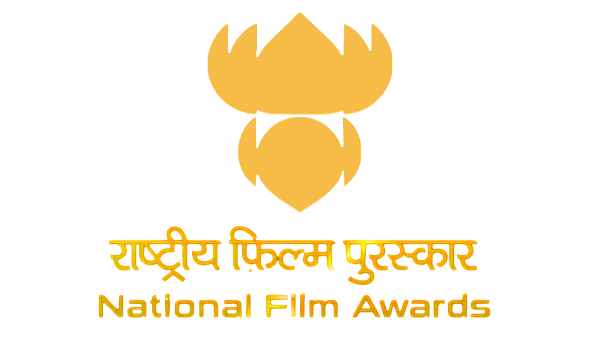
- Awarded for: Excellence in cinematic achievements for Indian cinema
- Country: India
- Presented by: Ministry of Information and Broadcasting (1954–1973); Directorate of Film Festivals (1974–2022); National Film Development Corporation (since 2023)
- First award: 10 October 1954; 72 years ago
- Website: nfaindia.org

The National Film Awards are awards for artistic and technical merit given for excellence within the Indian film industry. Established in 1954, it has been administered, along with the International Film Festival of India and the Indian Panorama, by the Indian government's Directorate of Film Festivals from 1974 (21st edition) until 2022 (68th edition), and by the NFDC since then.

Every year, a national panel appointed by the government selects the winning entry, and the award ceremony is held in New Delhi, where the President of India presents the awards. This is followed by the inauguration of the National Film Festival, where award-winning films are screened for the public. Declared for films produced in the previous year across the country, they hold the distinction of awarding merit to the best of Indian cinema overall, as well as presenting awards for the best films in each region and language of the country.

== History ==
The Awards were first presented in 1954. The Government of India conceived the ceremony to honor films made across India, on a national scale, to encourage the furthering of Indian art and culture. From 1974 until 2022, the Indian Directorate of Film Festivals administers the ceremony along with other major film events in India annually. Since then, National Film Development Corporation of India administers the ceremony.

== Juries and rules ==
The National Film Awards are presented in two main categories: Feature Films and Non-Feature Films. The juries are appointed by the NFDC. Neither the Government nor the organization has influence over which films are selected for consideration and which films ultimately win awards. There are strict criteria as to whether a film is eligible for consideration by the jury panels. Over 100 films made across the country are entered in each category (Feature and Non-Feature) for the awards and are deemed eligible each year.

A list of rules is presented every year in a document of regulations known as the National Film Award Regulations. The criteria for eligibility contain many clauses. Among them, there is a direct requirement for the makers of a film, and particularly the director, to be Indian nationals. Films entering the competition should be produced in India, and in the case of co-production involving a foreign entity, there are as many as six conditions that should be fulfilled in order for the film to qualify. According to the criteria, in order to be eligible for consideration by the jury, a film should be certified by the Central Board of Film Certification between 1 January and 31 December. Whether a film is considered a feature film or a non-feature film shall be decided by the Feature Film jury. The eligibility list includes a section of rules determining which films shall not be eligible for entry in the competition.

== Awards ceremonies ==
The "Year" in the below table corresponds to the year of the film certificate issued by the CBFC. The "Date" indicates when the awards were presented to the winners.

Year	Ceremony	Date	Best Feature Film	Best Non-Feature Film
1953	1st	10 October 1954	Shyamchi Aai	Mahabalipuram
1954	2nd	21 December 1955	Mirza Ghalib	Spirit of the Loom
1955	3rd	September 1956	Pather Panchali	Magic of Mountains
1956	4th	28 April 1957	Kabuliwala	Gotama The Buddha
1957	5th	16 April 1958	Do Aankhen Barah Haath	A Himalayan Tapestry
1958	6th	28 April 1959	Sagar Sangamey	Radha Krishna
1959	7th	1 May 1960	Apur Sansar	Kathakali
1960	8th	31 March 1961	Anuradha	Kangra and Kulu
1961	9th	21 April 1962	Bhagini Nivedita	Rabindranath Tagore
1962	10th	21 April 1963	Dada Thakur	Four Centuries Ago
1963	11th	25 April 1964	Shehar Aur Sapna	Song of the Snow
1964	12th	31 May 1965	Charulata	One Day
1965	13th	1966	Chemmeen	Cloven Horizon
1966	14th	10 October 1967	Teesri Kasam	Glimpses of West Bengal
1967	15th	25 November 1968	Hatey Bazarey	India '67
1968	16th	13 February 1970	Goopy Gyne Bagha Byne	Everest
1969	17th	21 November 1970	Bhuvan Shome	Amrita Sher-Gil
1970	18th	1971	Samskara	—
1971	19th	1 May 1972	Seemabaddha	Bhutan
1972	20th	1973	Swayamvaram	The Inner Eye
1973	21st	October 1974	Nirmalyam	The Flame Burns Bright
1974	22nd	1976	Chorus	Man In Search of Man
1975	23rd	1976	Chomana Dudi	Winged Wonderland
1976	24th	1977	Mrigayaa	—
1977	25th	27 April 1978	Ghatashraddha	Deshratna Rajendra Prasad
1978	26th	April 1979	—	Rumtek - A Monastery Wrethed
1978	26th	April 1979	—	In A Hundred Thousand Rainbows
1979	27th	May 1980	Shodh	—
1980	28th	April 1981	Akaler Shandhaney	Daldal
1981	29th	April 1982	Dakhal	Faces After The Storm
1982	30th	May 1983	Chokh	An Indian Story
1983	31st	June 1984	Adi Shankaracharya	The Procession
1984	32nd	June 1985	Damul	Music of Satyajit Ray
1985	33rd	June 1986	Chidambaram	Bombay: Our City
1986	34th	September 1987	Tabarana Kathe	The Land of Sand Dunes
1987	35th	April 1988	Halodhia Choraye Baodhan Khai	Bhopal: Beyond Genocide
1988	36th	31 May 1989	Piravi	Kanaka Purandara
1989	37th	May 1990	Bagh Bahadur	Aar Koto Din
1990	38th	7 April 1991	Marupakkam	Graven Image
1991	39th	6 May 1992	Agantuk	Sons of Abotani: The Misings
1992	40th	4 May 1993	Bhagavad Gita	In Search of Indian Theatre
1993	41st	30 September 1994	Charachar	Maihar Raag
1994	42nd	17 July 1995	Unishe April	Rasayatra
1995	43rd	6 August 1996	Kathapurushan	Tarana
1996	44th	15 July 1997	Lal Darja	Sham's Vision
1997	45th	10 July 1998	Thaayi Saheba	Jataner Jami
1998	46th	15 February 2000	Samar	In The Forest Hangs a Bridge
1999	47th	18 September 2000	Vanaprastham	Dui Paatan Ke Beech Mein
2000	48th	12 December 2001	Shantham	Rasikpriya
2001	49th	13 February 2003	Dweepa	Sonal
2002	50th	29 December 2003	Mondo Meyer Upakhyan	Narayan Gangaram Surve
2003	51st	2 February 2005	Shwaas	Kaya Poochhe Maya Se
2003	51st	2 February 2005	Shwaas	War and Peace
2004	52nd	21 October 2005	Page 3	Girni
2005	53rd	14 September 2007	Kaalpurush	Riding Solo to the Top of the World
2006	54th	2 September 2008	Pulijanmam	Bishar Blues
2007	55th	21 October 2009	Kanchivaram	Hope Dies Last in War
2008	56th	20 March 2010	Antaheen	AFSPA, 1958
2009	57th	22 October 2010	Kutty Srank	The Postman
2009	57th	22 October 2010	Kutty Srank	Bilal
2010	58th	9 September 2011	Adaminte Makan Abu	Germ
2011	59th	3 May 2012	Byari	And We Play On
2011	59th	3 May 2012	Deool	And We Play On
2012	60th	3 May 2013	Paan Singh Tomar	Shepherds of Paradise
2013	61st	3 May 2014	Ship of Theseus	Rangbhoomi
2014	62nd	3 May 2015	Court	Tender Is the Sight
2015	63rd	3 May 2016	Baahubali: The Beginning	Amdavad Ma Famous
2016	64th	3 May 2017	Kaasav	Fireflies in the Abyss
2017	65th	3 May 2018	Village Rockstars	—
2018	66th	23 December 2019	Hellaro	Son Rise
2018	66th	23 December 2019	Hellaro	The Secret Life of Frogs
2019	67th	25 October 2021	Marakkar: Lion of the Arabian Sea	An Engineered Dream
2020	68th	30 September 2022	Soorarai Pottru	Testimony of Ana
2021	69th	17 October 2023	Rocketry: The Nambi Effect	Ek Tha Gaon
2022	70th	8 October 2024	Aattam	Ayena
2023	71st	23 September 2025	12th Fail	Flowering Man
2024	72nd	22 September 2026	Article 370	Bhangaar

== Current categories ==
The awards are categorized into three sections; Feature film, Non-feature film, and Best Writing on cinema. With each section having its individual aims, Feature Film and Non-Feature Film sections aim at encouraging the production of films of aesthetic and technical excellence and social relevance, contributing to the understanding and appreciation of cultures of different regions of the country in cinematic form, thereby promoting unity and integrity of the nation. The Best Writing on cinema section aims to encourage the study and appreciation of cinema as an art form and dissemination of information and critical appreciation of the art form through the publication of various books, articles, reviews, newspaper coverage, and studies. In addition, a lifetime achievement award, named after the father of Indian cinema Dadasaheb Phalke, is awarded to a film personality for the outstanding contribution to the growth and development of Indian Cinema.

All the award winners are awarded a Medallion, a cash prize, and a certificate of merit. The Dadasaheb Phalke Award, six categories from the Feature Films section, three from the Non-Feature Films and Best Writing on Cinema sections each have been made eligible for Swarna Kamal (Golden Lotus Award), and the rest of the categories for Rajat Kamal (Silver Lotus Award).

=== Lifetime Achievement ===
List of current Lifetime Achievement categories by year introduced
Year introduced	Category
Golden Lotus (Swarna Kamal)
1969	Dadasaheb Phalke Award

=== Feature film ===
List of current Feature film categories by year introduced
Year introduced	Category
Golden Lotus (Swarna Kamal)
1953	Best Feature Film
1953	Best Children's Film
1967	Best Direction
1974	Best Popular Film Providing Wholesome Entertainment
1980	Best Debut Film of a Director
2022	Best Film in AVGC (Best Animation Film)
Silver Lotus (Rajat Kamal)
1954	Best Bengali Feature Film
1954	Best Hindi Feature Film
1954	Best Kannada Feature Film
1954	Best Malayalam Feature Film
1954	Best Marathi Feature Film
1954	Best Tamil Feature Film
1954	Best Telugu Feature Film
1955	Best Assamese Feature Film
1960	Best Gujarati Feature Film
1960	Best Odia Feature Film
1962	Best Punjabi Feature Film
1965	Best Konkani Feature Film
1967	Best Actor in a Leading Role
1967	Best Actress in a Leading Role
1967	Best Music Direction
1967	Best Male Playback Singer
1967	Best Screenplay
1967	Best Cinematography
1968	Best Female Playback Singer
1968	Best Lyrics
1968	Best Child Artist
1972	Best Manipuri Feature Film
1976	Best Sound Design
1976	Best Editing
1978	Special Mention
1979	Best Production Design
1984	Best Actor in a Supporting Role
1984	Best Actress in a Supporting Role
1984	Best Costume Design
1985	Best Bodo Feature Film
1991	Best Choreography (Note: Although the category was introduced in 39th National Film Awards (1991), there was no winner. The first winner was announced during the 40th National Film Awards (1992).)
2006	Best Make-up
2016	Best Stunt Choreography
2022	Best Feature Film Promoting National, Social and Environmental Values
2022	Best Film in AVGC (Best Visual Effects)

=== Non-feature film ===
List of current Non-feature film categories by year introduced
Year introduced	Category
Golden Lotus (Swarna Kamal)
1953	Best Non-Feature Film
1991	Best Debut Film of a Director (Note: The category was remained in the Rajat Kamal (Silver Lotus) section since the introduction, but was moved to Swarna Kamal (Golden Lotus) section during the 70th National Film Awards (2022).)
2000	Best Direction
Silver Lotus (Rajat Kamal)
1967	Best Animation Film
1978	Special Mention
1985	Best Arts / Cultural Film
1987	Best Short Film
1990	Best Cinematography
1990	Best Editing
1990	Best Sound Design
1993	Best Music Direction
2003	Best Narration / Voice Over
2022	Best Non Feature Film Promoting National, Social and Environmental Values
2022	Best Biographical / Historical Reconstruction / Compilation Film
2022	Best Documentary
2022	Best Script

=== Writing on cinema ===
List of current Writing on cinema categories by year introduced
Year introduced	Category
Golden Lotus (Swarna Kamal)
1981	Best Book on Cinema
1984	Best Film Critic

== Records ==
List of films with most awards
Film (Year)	No. of awards won
Lagaan (2001)	8
Bajirao Mastani (2015)	7
Godmother (1998)	6
Kannathil Muthamittal (2002)	6
Aadukalam (2010)	6
RRR (2022)	6
Jogwa (2008)	5
Kutty Srank (2009)	5
Soorarai Pottru (2020)	5
Gangubai Kathiawadi (2022)	5
