= Anand Ekarshi =

Indian filmmaker

- Born: Sebastian K Abraham; Kerala, India
- Occupations: Film director; screenwriter
- Years active: 2023–present
- Parents: K.M. Abraham (father); Soumi Abraham (mother)
- Awards: National Film Award (2024)

Anand Ekarshi (born Sebastian K Abraham) is a Malayalam filmmaker who gained recognition for his directorial debut, Aattam.

== Early life and education ==
Anand Ekarshi was born in Kerala. His interest in theatre and acting began at the young age of 10. He attributes his narrative style to his involvement with Lokadharmi, a theatre group based in Kochi. He holds a degree in Communicative English and a postgraduate degree in Psychology.

== Career ==
Before making his mark with feature films, Anand Ekarshi worked on various short films and music videos in Malayalam. He also had a brief stint under the guidance of filmmaker Imtiaz Ali.

=== Directorial debut: Aattam ===
Ekarshi made his directorial debut with Aattam in 2023, a film that won three [National Film Award for Best Feature Film|] Best screenplay and Best Editing] at the 70th National Film Awards in India.

== Accolades ==
Year	Award	Film	Category	Ref.
2024	70th National Film Awards	Aattam	Best Feature Film	
2024	70th National Film Awards	Aattam	Best Screenplay	
2023	Kerala Film Critics Association Awards	Aattam	Best Film	

== See also ==
- Aattam
