= 27th National Film Awards =

Indian ceremony celebrating cinema of 1979

- Awarded for: Best of Indian cinema in 1979
- Awarded by: Directorate of Film Festivals
- Presented by: Neelam Sanjiva Reddy (President of India)
- Announced on: April 1980
- Presented on: May 1980
- Official website: dff.nic.in

Highlights
- Best Feature Film: Shodh
- Dadasaheb Phalke Award: Sohrab Modi
- Most awards: Sankarabharanam (4)

The 27th National Film Awards, was presented by Directorate of Film Festivals, the organisation set up by Ministry of Information and Broadcasting, India to felicitate the best of Indian Cinema released in 1979. The ceremony took place in April 1980.

== Awards ==
Awards were divided into feature films and non-feature films.

=== Lifetime Achievement Award ===
Name of Award	Image	Awardee(s)	Awarded As	Awards
Dadasaheb Phalke Award		Sohrab Modi	Actor, Director and Producer	Swarna Kamal, ₹ 40,000 and a Shawl

==== All India Award ====
Following were the awards given:

Name of Award	Name of Film	Language	Awardee(s)	Cash prize
Best Feature Film	Shodh	Hindi	Producer: Sitakant Misra	Swarna Kamal and ₹ 50,000/-
Best Feature Film	Shodh	Hindi	Director: Biplab Roy Chowdhury	Swarna Kamal and ₹ 25,000/-
Best Feature Film with Mass Appeal, Wholesome Entertainment and Aesthetic Value	Sankarabharanam	Telugu	Producer: Edida Nageshwara Rao	Swarna Kamal and ₹ 50,000/-
Best Feature Film with Mass Appeal, Wholesome Entertainment and Aesthetic Value	Sankarabharanam	Telugu	Director: K. Viswanath	Swarna Kamal and ₹ 25,000/-
Best Feature Film on National Integration	22 June 1897	Marathi	Producer: Jayu Patwardhan	Rajat Kamal and ₹ 30,000
Best Feature Film on National Integration	22 June 1897	Marathi	Director: Nachiket Patwardhan	Rajat Kamal and ₹ 10,000
Best Children's Film	Dangeyedda Makkalu	Kannada	Producer: T. S. Narasimhan, B. S. Somasundar	Swarna Kamal and ₹ 15,000/-
Best Children's Film	Dangeyedda Makkalu	Kannada	Director: U. S. Vadiraj	Swarna Kamal and ₹ 10,000/-
Best Direction	Ek Din Pratidin	Bengali	Mrinal Sen	Rajat Kamal and ₹ 20,000
Best Screenplay	Sparsh	Hindi	Sai Paranjpye	Rajat Kamal and ₹ 5,000 Each
Best Actor	Sparsh	Hindi	Naseeruddin Shah	Rajat Kamal and ₹ 10,000
Best Actress	Pasi	Tamil	Shoba	Rajat Kamal and ₹ 10,000
Best Child Artist	Aangan Ki Kali	Hindi	Geeta Khanna	Rajat Kamal and ₹ 5,000
Best Cinematography (Color)	Shodh	Hindi	Rajan Kinagi	Rajat Kamal and ₹ 5,000
Best Cinematography (Black and White)	Neem Annapurna	Bengali	Kamal Nayak	Rajat Kamal and ₹ 5,000
Best Editing	Ek Din Pratidin	Bengali	Gangadhar Naskar	Rajat Kamal and ₹ 5,000
Best Music Direction	Sankarabharanam	Telugu	K. V. Mahadevan	Rajat Kamal and ₹ 10,000
Best Male Playback Singer	Sankarabharanam	Telugu	S. P. Balasubrahmanyam	Rajat Kamal and ₹ 10,000
Best Female Playback Singer	Sankarabharanam	Telugu	Vani Jairam	Rajat Kamal and ₹ 10,000
Special Mention	Acharya Kripalani	English	–	Certificate Only

==== Regional Award ====
The awards were given to the best films made in the regional languages of India.

Name of Award	Name of Film	Awardee(s)	Awards
Best Feature Film in Bengali	Ek Din Pratidin	Producer: Amalendu Chakraborty	Rajat Kamal and ₹ 15,000/-
Best Feature Film in Bengali	Ek Din Pratidin	Director: Mrinal Sen	Rajat Kamal and ₹ 7,500/-
Best Feature Film in Hindi	Sparsh	Producer: Basu Bhattacharya	Rajat Kamal and ₹ 15,000/-
Best Feature Film in Hindi	Sparsh	Director: Sai Paranjpye	Rajat Kamal and ₹ 7,500/-
Best Feature Film in Kannada	Arivu	Producer: K. R. Lalitha	Rajat Kamal and ₹ 15,000/-
Best Feature Film in Kannada	Arivu	Director: Katte Ramachandra	Rajat Kamal and ₹ 7,500/-
Best Feature Film in Malayalam	Peruvazhiyambalam	Producer: Prem Prakash	Rajat Kamal and ₹ 15,000/-
Best Feature Film in Malayalam	Peruvazhiyambalam	Director: Padmarajan	Rajat Kamal and ₹ 7,500/-
Best Feature Film in Manipuri	Olangthagee Wangmadasoo	Producer: G. Narayan Sharma	Rajat Kamal and ₹ 15,000/-
Best Feature Film in Manipuri	Olangthagee Wangmadasoo	Director: Aribam Syam Sharma	Rajat Kamal and ₹ 7,500/-
Best Feature Film in Marathi	Sinhasan	Producer: Jabbar Patel	Rajat Kamal and ₹ 15,000/-
Best Feature Film in Marathi	Sinhasan	Director: Jabbar Patel	Rajat Kamal and ₹ 7,500/-
Best Feature Film in Odia	Shri Krishnaka Rasalila	Producer:	Rajat Kamal and ₹ 15,000/-
Best Feature Film in Odia	Shri Krishnaka Rasalila	Director:	Rajat Kamal and ₹ 7,500/-
Best Feature Film in Tamil	Pasi	Producer: Sunitha Cine Arts	Rajat Kamal and ₹ 15,000/-
Best Feature Film in Tamil	Pasi	Director: Durai	Rajat Kamal and ₹ 7,500/-
Best Feature Film in Telugu	Nagna Sathyam	Producer: U. Visweswar Rao	Rajat Kamal and ₹ 15,000/-
Best Feature Film in Telugu	Nagna Sathyam	Director: U. Visweswar Rao	Rajat Kamal and ₹ 7,500/-
