= Sadayam =

- Theatrical release poster
- Directed by: Sibi Malayil
- Written by: M. T. Vasudevan Nair
- Produced by: G. P. Vijayakumar (executive producer)
- Starring: Mohanlal; Thilakan; Maathu; Sreenivasan; Nedumudi Venu
- Cinematography: Anandakuttan
- Edited by: L. Bhoominathan
- Music by: Johnson
- Production company: Seven Arts Films
- Distributed by: Seven Arts Release
- Release date: 1992
- Running time: 147 minutes
- Country: India
- Language: Malayalam

Sadayam (transl. Merciful) is a 1992 Indian Malayalam-language psychological thriller film written by M. T. Vasudevan Nair and directed by Sibi Malayil. It stars Mohanlal, Thilakan, Nedumudi Venu, Murali, Sreenivasan, Maathu, K. P. A. C. Lalitha, and T. G. Ravi. The film was produced and distributed by G. P. Vijayakumar of Seven Arts Films. The film score was composed by Johnson.

The story follows convict Sathyanathan (Mohanlal) who is awaiting capital punishment for the murder of two young girls and two men. Mohanlal's performance in the film is regarded as one of the finest in his career. Despite faring poorly at the box office, the film came to be appreciated years later for their cult following. M. T. Vasudevan Nair won the National Film Awards for Best Screenplay.

== Plot ==
Sathyanathan is condemned to death for brutally murdering four persons – two adults and two young girls – and is awaiting his final call. He shows no remorse and is just as cheerful as a man who knows he has done no wrong. The prison doctor Dr. Nambiar's son Vijayan is one of Sathyan's victims; he wants to sign his death certificate and see the fear in his eyes as he is led up the gallows but the doctor is just as puzzled as to why the crime was committed.

There are appeals in lower courts and petitions for pardons by the cops as a matter of routine but Sathyan has no great interest in living. Eventually, when he wishes to start life again on a fresh slate because he now wants to live, in an O Henry-sque moment, he's denied a pardon and on Sept 29th, 1991, two years after he is originally convicted of the multiple murders, he is hanged to death. In a series of flashbacks, the story unfolds focusing on Sathyan's past and recreates the chilling crime scene, explaining his actions.

Sathyan is a fatherless child who is bullied and abused in his childhood by the people around him until he is rescued by a priest who realizes that the kid is a talented artist. Under the aegis of Father, Sathyan becomes a painter who makes a living by painting sign boards and hoardings. As part of one of his assignments, he takes a rented house in Kozhikode next to a house of ill-virtue where Jaya and her two young sisters live with their stepmom. They have no future to look forward to and it is only a matter of time when the stepmom get them to carry out prostitution.

He helps the kids in their education and gets Jaya a job in the company in which he's working. Sathyan likes Jaya and wishes to marry her and settle down in life but destiny has other ideas; circumstances force her to end up as a prostitute and there are signs that her sisters will sink in the same quagmire later. In a moment of extreme paranoia, Sathyan kills the two girls in a bid to save them from prostitution and eventually both the guys responsible for her state.

All this was narrated in Sathyan's flashbacks and after that, the film cuts back to the present as Sathyan now wants to live on a fresh slate.

We then see the climax in which Sathyan is escorted to the gallows with his hands tied and his head covered in a black cloth and then he's hanged to death on that night at 5 AM. The film ends sad as Jaya weeps over Sathyan's dead body that morning.

== Cast ==
- Mohanlal as Sathyanathan 'Sathyan‘, a serial killer awaiting death sentence; the main protagonist.
- Thilakan as Dr. K. V. G. Nambiar, the prison doctor who is the father of Vijayan.
- Nedumudi Venu as Father Dominic, the priest who took care of Sathyan when he was a boy.
- Maathu as Jaya, Sathyan's love interest
- KPAC Lalitha as Devakiamma, Jaya's wicked stepmom
- Janardhanan as Harishankar, Police superintendent
- Sreenivasan as Kunjali, a fellow inmate and Sathyan's friend
- Murali as Madhavan Jailer (Police Officer)
- Mahesh as Vijayan, one of Sathyan's victims
- Kaveri as Lathika, Jaya's sister
- Augustine as Chandran, the main antagonist and a villainous pimp
- T. G. Ravi as Kanaran, a fellow inmate
- M. G. Sasi as Samuel
- Kozhikode Narayanan Nair as Ramettan

== Awards ==
- National Film Award for Best Screenplay - M. T. Vasudevan Nair
- Filmfare Award for Best Director – Malayalam - Siby Malayil
- Kerala Film Journalists Award for Best Actor - Mohanlal

== Soundtrack ==
Johnson composed the songs, for which the lyrics were written by Kaithapram Damodaran Namboothiri.

No.	Title	Singer(s)	Notes
1	"Vaasantharaavin"	Sujatha Mohan	Raga: Pilu
2	"Arabikkadhayile"	K. G. Markose	
