= Byari (film) =

- Theatrical release poster
- Directed by: K. P. Suveeran
- Screenplay by: Suveeran
- Produced by: T. H. Althaf Hussain
- Starring: Mallika; Althaf Hussain; Mamukkoya
- Cinematography: Muralikrishnan
- Edited by: S. Manaohar
- Music by: Viswajith
- Production company: Thanneer Films
- Release date: 9 June 2011 (Mangalore)
- Running time: 100 minutes
- Country: India
- Language: Byari/Beary
- Budget: ₹7 million (US$83,000)

Byari is a 2011 Indian film in the Beary dialect of Malyalam, written and directed by Suveeran. It is the first feature film to be made in this dialect. The film was screened at various film festivals where it received positive reviews. It released in theatres in Dakshina Kannada region on 9 June 2011.

Byari won the National Film Award for Best Feature Film while Malayalam actress Mallika got a special mention from the National Film Award jury for her performance in the film.

== Plot ==
The film depicts the culture, tradition and dialect of the Byari community. It highlights strict laws and regulations of marriage in the community, pros and cons of divorce in Islam and how it affects the women. The film, which is based on issues connected with Iddat (marriage) and Talaq (divorce) in Islam, tries to bring such problems to the notice of Islamic lawmakers. It was on the same day as she gets her first periods that Nadira's (Mallika) marriage is fixed. On that very disturbing day, it is to her childhood pal that she shares her concerns. Her husband who is thrice her age, despite the customs and traditions, loves her to the core. However, as she continues her content married life with her child, she gets divorced because of a dispute between her husband and her father.

Nadira is made to spend her life at her father's place devoid of any contact with the outside world. In the meantime, her husband takes the child away. Eventually bypassing many hurdles, it turns out that Nadira can spend her life with her husband yet again. However, for that as per the dictates of the law, she must marry and divorce some other man.

== Cast ==
- Mallika as Nadira
- Althaf Hussain
- Mamukkoya
- Ambika Mohan
- Majeed
- K. T. S. Padannayil
- Prajeesh
- Aswathi
- Asha
- Rahim

== Production ==
The film was Directed by Suveeran and produced by T.H. Althaf Hussain under the banner of Thanneer films. The shooting of the film took place in Dakshin Kannada districts like Suratkal, Jokatte, Bajpe, Thokottu and parts of Karnataka.

== Awards ==
- 2011: National Film Award for Best Feature Film
- 2011: National Film Award – Special Mention – Mallika
- 2012: SAARC film Bronze Award – (From Sri Lanka)

== See also ==
- Beary dialect
- Beary
- 59th National Film Awards
- National Film Award for Best Feature Film
