= Ramanujacharya (film) =

- Directed by: G. V. Iyer
- Screenplay by: G. V. Iyer
- Produced by: Jaya Chakravarthi
- Cinematography: Madhu Ambat
- Edited by: Suresh Urs
- Music by: M. Balamuralikrishna
- Release date: 6 October 1989
- Country: India
- Budget: Tamil

Ramanujacharya is a 1989 Tamil-language biographical film on Ramanujacharya, a social reformer. It was written and directed by G. V. Iyer.
