= Aattam =

2024 film by Anand Ekarshi

- Theatrical release poster
- Directed by: Anand Ekarshi
- Written by: Anand Ekarshi
- Produced by: Ajith Joy
- Starring: Zarin Shihab; Vinay Forrt; Kalabhavan Shajohn; Aji Thiruvamkulam; Jolly Antony; Madan Babu K.; Nandhan Unni; Prasanth Madhavan; Sanosh Murali; Santhosh Piravom; Selvaraj Raghavan V. R.; Sijin Sijeesh; Sudheer Babu
- Cinematography: Anurudh Aneesh
- Edited by: Mahesh Bhuvanend
- Music by: Basil C J
- Production company: Joy Movie Productions
- Distributed by: Reliance Entertainment
- Release dates: 13 October 2023 (IFFLA); 5 January 2024
- Running time: 139 minutes
- Country: India
- Language: Malayalam
- Box office: ₹ 1.5 crore

Aattam (transl. The Play) is a 2023 Indian Malayalam-language thriller film written and directed by Anand Ekarshi. The film was produced by Ajith Joy through Joy Movie Productions.

The film won the 2023 Grand Jury Award at the Indian Film Festival of Los Angeles. It was chosen as the opening feature film at the 54th International Film Festival of India held in Goa, and won best film at 70th National Film Award for Best Feature Film.

== Plot ==
Aattam explores the complex dynamics within a theater group, Arangu, composed of thirteen members—twelve men and one woman—and their production of a satirical play that critiques the male gaze in society. The story centers on Anjali, a dedicated actress who has been part of the group since she was sixteen. Despite her passion and talent, Anjali is treated by her male colleagues not as an equal artiste but as a subordinate, relegated to traditional "women's tasks" such as stitching costumes and applying makeup. This systemic gender disparity becomes evident as Anjali shines on stage, especially in her portrayal of the character Padmini, outshining her male counterparts.

Among the group is Hari, a cinematic actor who has recently joined Arangu. His star power brings increased attention and financial benefits to the group, composed of ordinary people with diverse professions, including drivers, plumbers, and chefs. While this success is vital for the group, it also fuels competition and envy, particularly from Vinay, another member who dreams of being the lead but feels overshadowed by Hari's rising fame.

The group celebrates the success of their play at a party hosted by Hari's foreign friends, where tensions rise. Amidst the revelry, some of the members criticise Anjali for her behaviour and attire, accusing her of being too free-spirited and provocatively dressed. Anjali, however, remains confident, feeling that she deserves to enjoy herself after her impressive performance. Unbeknownst to the others, Anjali is secretly having an affair with Vinay, who has yet to divorce his wife.

As the evening progresses, Anjali returns to her shared room with Sajitha and her daughter. The next morning, she mysteriously disappears. Anjali later reveals that she was groped while asleep, with her only clue being the scent of perfume and a key left behind by the perpetrator. She suspects Hari, but without clear evidence, the matter remains clouded in uncertainty. Disturbed and disgusted, Anjali confides in Vinay, trusting him to help her navigate the situation.

Vinay, whose ego is already bruised by Hari's swift rise to prominence, sees this incident as an opportunity to challenge Hari's position within the group. His motivations, however, are complicated by personal feelings, including his desire to secure a male lead role for himself and his discontent with Hari's celebrity status. Rather than bringing the issue to the group immediately, Vinay confides in Malaban, the senior-most member, out of concern that revealing the affair would create suspicions of conspiracy and further complicate matters.

The group is eventually summoned to a meeting, where differing opinions emerge. Some members dismiss Anjali's accusations as baseless, while others call for Hari's expulsion. Some members accuse Anjali of being intoxicated and possibly hallucinating, while others blame her provocative attire. The discussion becomes more about self-preservation than justice, with many members concerned about the impact on their potential European tour, which would offer them a life-changing opportunity.

Anjali is eventually confronted by the group, where her evidence—mainly the key ring and her memories of the incident—are debated. Some members even suggest that Anjali might have experienced tactile hallucinations. The discussion shifts away from the truth, with Malaban suggesting that the accusation might be a mere illusion. Meanwhile, others are more concerned with protecting their reputations and the potential loss of the foreign tour than addressing the gravity of Anjali's trauma.

Feeling betrayed by Vinay's reluctance to support her and the group's lack of empathy, Anjali decides to leave the theater group, realising that her dignity and self-worth are no longer compatible with their toxic environment. The film culminates in a shocking revelation: Hari admits that the promised European tour was a fabrication, orchestrated as a prank in retaliation for a similar trick pulled on him by Malaban in the past. This revelation exposes the self-serving nature of the men in the group, highlighting their indifference to Anjali's suffering.

In the final act, Anjali takes the stage once more, reenacting her role in the play. She declares that she no longer cares to identify the perpetrator because, to her, all the men in the group are potential perpetrators, indifferent to her pain and struggles. The film ends with a powerful statement: justice was not achieved by the men, but rather by art, through the theater, where Anjali reclaims her voice.

== Cast ==
- Zarin Shihab as Anjali
- Vinay Forrt as Vinay
- Kalabhavan Shajohn as Hari
- Aji Thiruvamkulam as Aji
- Jolly Antony as Jolly
- Madan Babu K. as Madan
- Nandhan Unni as Nandhan
- Prasanth Madhavan as Prasanth
- Sanosh Murali as Sanosh
- Santhosh Piravom as Santhosh
- Selvaraj Raghavan V. R. as Selvan
- Sijin Sijeesh as Sijin
- Sudheer Babu as Sudheer

== Release ==
After screenings at IFFLA, IFFI and IFFK, Aattam was released in theaters on 5 January 2024 to acclaim from audiences and critics. On the review aggregator website Rotten Tomatoes, 100% of 7 critics' reviews are positive, with an average rating of 8.5/10.

== Accolades ==
Year	Award	Category	Recipient	Ref.
2024	70th National Film Awards	Best Feature Film	Anand Ekarshi	
2024	70th National Film Awards	Best Editing	Mahesh Bhuvanend	
2024	70th National Film Awards	Best Screenplay	Anand Ekarshi	
2023	Kerala Film Critics Association Awards	Best Film	Anand Ekarshi	
2023	Kerala Film Critics Association Awards	Best Supporting Actor	Kalabhavan Shajohn	
2023	Kerala Film Critics Association Awards	Best Actress	Zarin Shihab	
