= Bhagavad Gita (film) =

- Directed by: G. V. Iyer
- Written by: Bannanje Govindacharya; G. V. Iyer
- Based on: Bhagavad Gita
- Produced by: T. Subbarami Reddy
- Starring: Neena Gupta; Gopi Manohar; G. V. Ragahvendra; Govindh Rao; Surya Mohan Kulshreshtha
- Cinematography: Madhu Ambat
- Edited by: Shri Nanjundaswamy
- Music by: Mangalampalli Balamuralikrishna; B. V. Karanth (background score)
- Distributed by: NFDC India; A. P. Film chamber of Commerce
- Release date: 1993
- Running time: 140 minutes
- Country: India
- Languages: Sanskrit; Telugu; Hindi

Bhagavad Gita (known as Bhagvad Gita: Song of the Lord in the United States) is a 1993 Indian Sanskrit-language drama film with a few dialogues in Hindi and Telugu language. It was produced by T. Subbarami Reddy and directed by G. V. Iyer. The film is based on the Hindu religious book Bhagavad Gita, which is part of the epic Mahabharata.

== Plot ==
G. V. Iyer's film opens with a flowery pooja performed on a shivalinga, followed by an on-stage presentation of the film's cast and crew. The mayhem of the Kurukshetra War is witnessed by Prince Arjuna before he and his charioteer, Krishna, begin the dialogue that is the Bhagavad Gita. Complimentary imagery accompany the verses of the Gita, with many of the scenes set in nature, eventually crescendoing with Arjuna standing atop clouds among the Himalayas, transitioning further up into the cosmos as imagery of the planets accompany verses sung by Krishna.

== Reception ==
The film premiered at the Andhra Pradesh Film Chamber of Commerce in Hyderabad, India, and International Film Festival of India. The film went on to win the National Film Award for Best Feature Film at the 40th National Film Awards in 1993.

== See also ==
- G. V. Iyer
- Adi Shankaracharya (film)
