= National Film Award for Best Feature Film =

Indian film award

- National award for contributions to Indian Cinema
- Awarded for: Best feature film of the year
- Sponsored by: National Film Development Corporation of India
- Formerly called: President's Gold Medal for Best Feature Film
- Rewards: Swarna Kamal (Golden Lotus); ₹3,00,000
- First award: 1953
- Most recent winner: Article 370 (2024)

The National Film Award for Best Feature Film is one of the categories in the National Film Awards presented annually by the National Film Development Corporation of India, the organisation set up by Ministry of Information and Broadcasting in India. It is one of several awards presented for feature films and awarded with the Golden Lotus (Swarna Kamal). The award is announced for films produced in a year across the country, in all Indian languages. As of 2024, the award comprises a Swarna Kamal, a certificate, and a cash prize of ₹3,00,000 and is presented to the producer and the director of the film.

The National Film Awards were established in 1954 to "encourage production of the films of a high aesthetic and technical standard and educational and culture value" and also planned to include awards for regional films. The awards were instituted as "State Awards for Films" but were renamed to "National Film Awards" at the 15th National Film Awards in 1967. The award is one of six Swarna Kamal awards presented for the feature films. The award-winning film is included at the annual International Film Festival of India. Only the films made in any Indian language and silent films which are either shot on 35 mm, in a wider gauge, or digital format but released on a film or Video/Digital format and certified by the Central Board of Film Certification as a feature film or featurette are made eligible for the award.

The inaugural award was named as "President's Gold Medal for the All India Best Feature Film" and was awarded to Marathi film, Shyamchi Aai (Shyam's Mother), produced and directed by Pralhad Keshav Atre and is based on Pandurang Sadashiv Sane's Marathi novel of the same name.

== History ==
Since its inception in 1953, the producer of the film is awarded with the gold medal and a certificate. A cash prize of ₹ 20,000 was introduced at the 5th National Film Awards (1957) and was revised to ₹ 40,000 at the 18th National Film Awards (1970), to ₹ 50,000 at the 28th National Film Awards (1980), to ₹ 2,50,000 at the 54th National Film Awards (2006).

From 1953 till 1956, the director of the film was awarded with the Gold medal which was later changed in 1957 to a cash prize of ₹ 5,000. From 1967 till 1973, a plaque was also awarded to the director and cash prize was revised to ₹ 10,000 in 1970. At the 22nd National Film Awards (1974), the award for the director was changed to Rajat Kamal (Silver Lotus) and a cash prize of ₹ 15,000 which was later revised to ₹ 20,000 at the 25th National Film Awards (1977). Since 28th National Film Awards (1980), the director is awarded with the Swarna Kamal and a cash prize of ₹ 25,000 which was later revised to ₹50,000 at the 28th National Film Awards (1980), ₹2,50,000 at the 54th National Film Awards (2006), and ₹3,00,000 at the 70th National Film Awards (2022).

In 1973 and 1974, the lead actor and actress of the film were also awarded. P. J. Antony and Sumithra received a souvenir for Malayalam film Nirmalyam at the 21st National Film Awards (1973). Antony was also awarded the Best Actor, then known as the "Bharat Award for the Best Actor". Utpal Dutt and Gita Sen were awarded with a medallion for Bengali Film Chorus at 22nd National Film Awards (1974).

== Winners ==
As of the 2024 edition, 72 feature films have been awarded: Bengali (22); Malayalam (13); Hindi (14); (Note: Two films: Ship of Theseus (2013) and Court (2014) were shot simultaneously in multiple languages.) Kannada and Marathi (each 6); (Note: Court (2014) was shot simultaneously in multiple languages.) Tamil (3); Assamese, Gujarati and Sanskrit (each 2); Beary and Telugu (each 1). At the 26th National Film Awards (1978), no feature film was awarded with the Best Feature film award as the jury headed by filmmaker Chetan Anand scrutinised eighty films but did not consider any film to be "worthy of merit" and "measured up to the standard of excellence set forth by the jury". At the 59th National Film Awards, two feature films shared the award; Marathi film Deool (Temple) and Beary film Byari. Most recently, the award is presented to the film Article 370, directed by Aditya Suhas Jambhale.

Satyajit Ray is the most honoured director where six of his films—Pather Panchali (1955), Apur Sansar (1959), Charulata (1964), Goopy Gyne Bagha Byne (1968), Seemabaddha (1971), and Agantuk (1991)—won the award, followed Buddhadeb Dasgupta (five), Girish Kasaravalli and Mrinal Sen (four each), Shaji N. Karun (three), and Adoor Gopalakrishnan, Tapan Sinha, G. V. Iyer and Priyadarshan (two each).

As of 2026, the award was presented to the films of fourteen debutant directors; Satyajit Ray (Pather Panchali, 1955), Adoor Gopalakrishnan (Swayamvaram, 1972), M. T. Vasudevan Nair (Nirmalyam, 1973), Girish Kasaravalli (Ghatashraddha, 1977), Shaji N Karun (Piravi, 1988), Sandeep Sawant (Shwaas, 2003), Salim Ahamed (Adaminte Makan Abu, 2010), Suveeran (Byari, 2011), Anand Gandhi (Ship of Theseus, 2013), Chaitanya Tamhane (Court, 2015), Abhishek Shah (Hellaro, 2018) R. Madhavan (Rocketry: The Nambi Effect, 2021), Anand Ekarshi (Aattam, 2022) and Aditya Suhas Jambhale (Article 370, 2024).

Five films awarded with the Best Feature film award were also the Indian submission for the Academy Award for the Best Foreign Language Film; Apur Sansar (1959), Shwaas (2004), Adaminte Makan Abu (2011), Court (2015) and Village Rockstars (2018) . Adi Shankaracharya (1983), the first film made in Sanskrit language, and Byari (2011), the first film made in Beary language, won the award at the 31st National Film Awards and 59th National Film Awards, respectively.

=== List of winners ===
Films in the following languages have won the Best Feature Film award:

| Indicates a joint award for that year |

List of films, showing the year (award ceremony), language(s), producer(s) and director(s)
| Year | Film(s) | Language(s) | Producer(s) | Director(s) | Refs. |
|---|---|---|---|---|---|
| 1953 (1st) | Shyamchi Aai | Marathi | Pralhad Keshav Atre | Pralhad Keshav Atre | |
| 1954 (2nd) | Mirza Ghalib | Hindi | Sohrab Modi | Sohrab Modi | |
| 1955 (3rd) | Pather Panchali | Bengali | Government of West Bengal | Satyajit Ray | |
| 1956 (4th) | Kabuliwala | Bengali | Charuchitra | Tapan Sinha | |
| 1957 (5th) | Do Aankhen Barah Haath | Hindi | V. Shantaram | V. Shantaram | |
| 1958 (6th) | Sagar Sangamey | Bengali | De Luxe Film Distributors | Debaki Bose | |
| 1959 (7th) | Apur Sansar | Bengali | Satyajit Ray Productions | Satyajit Ray | |
| 1960 (8th) | Anuradha | Hindi | Hrishikesh Mukherjee and L. B. Thakur | Hrishikesh Mukherjee | |
| 1961 (9th) | Bhagini Nivedita | Bengali | Aurora Film Corporation | Bijoy Bose | |
| 1962 (10th) | Dada Thakur | Bengali | Shyamlal Jalan | Sudhir Mukherjee | |
| 1963 (11th) | Shehar Aur Sapna | Hindi | Naya Sansar | Khwaja Ahmad Abbas | |
| 1964 (12th) | Charulata | Bengali | R. D. Bansal | Satyajit Ray | |
| 1965 (13th) | Chemmeen | Malayalam | Babu Ismail Settu | Ramu Kariat | |
| 1966 (14th) | Teesri Kasam | Hindi | Shailendra | Basu Bhattacharya | |
| 1967 (15th) | Hatey Bazarey | Bengali | Asim Dutta | Tapan Sinha | |
| 1968 (16th) | Goopy Gyne Bagha Byne | Bengali | Nepal Dutta and Asim Dutta | Satyajit Ray | |
| 1969 (17th) | Bhuvan Shome | Hindi | Mrinal Sen Productions | Mrinal Sen | |
| 1970 (18th) | Samskara | Kannada | Tikkavarapu Pattabhirama Reddy | Tikkavarapu Pattabhirama Reddy | |
| 1971 (19th) | Seemabaddha | Bengali | Bharat Shumsher Jung Bahadur Rana | Satyajit Ray | |
| 1972 (20th) | Swayamvaram | Malayalam | Adoor Gopalakrishnan | Adoor Gopalakrishnan | |
| 1973 (21st) | Nirmalyam (Note: P. J. Antony (Leading Actor) and Sumithra (Leading Actress) were awarded with Medallion.) | Malayalam | M. T. Vasudevan Nair | M. T. Vasudevan Nair | |
| 1974 (22nd) | Chorus (Note: Utpal Dutt (Leading Actor) and Gita Sen (Leading Actress) were awarded with Medallion.) | Bengali | Mrinal Sen Productions | Mrinal Sen | |
| 1975 (23rd) | Chomana Dudi | Kannada | Praja Films | B. V. Karanth | |
| 1976 (24th) | Mrigayaa | Hindi | Uday Bhaskar International | Mrinal Sen | |
| 1977 (25th) | Ghatashraddha | Kannada | Sadanand Suvarna | Girish Kasaravalli | |
| 1978 (26th) | No Award | | | | |
| 1979 (27th) | Shodh | Hindi | Sitakant Misra | Biplab Roy Chowdhury | |
| 1980 (28th) | Akaler Shandhaney | Bengali | D. K. Films | Mrinal Sen | |
| 1981 (29th) | Dakhal | Bengali | Government of West Bengal | Goutam Ghose | |
| 1982 (30th) | Chokh | Bengali | Department of Information, Cultural Affairs India and the Government of West Bengal | Utpalendu Chakrabarty | |
| 1983 (31st) | Adi Shankaracharya | Sanskrit | NFDC | G. V. Iyer | |
| 1984 (32nd) | Damul | Hindi | Prakash Jha Productions | Prakash Jha | |
| 1985 (33rd) | Chidambaram | Malayalam | G. Aravindan | G. Aravindan | |
| 1986 (34th) | Tabarana Kathe | Kannada | Girish Kasaravalli | Girish Kasaravalli | |
| 1987 (35th) | Halodhia Choraye Baodhan Khai | Assamese | Sailadhar Baruah and Jahnu Barua | Jahnu Barua | |
| 1988 (36th) | Piravi | Malayalam | Film Folks | Shaji N. Karun | |
| 1989 (37th) | Bagh Bahadur | Bengali | Buddhadeb Dasgupta | Buddhadeb Dasgupta | |
| 1990 (38th) | Marupakkam | Tamil | NFDC | K. S. Sethumadhavan | |
| 1991 (39th) | Agantuk | Bengali | NFDC | Satyajit Ray | |
| 1992 (40th) | Bhagavad Gita | Sanskrit | T. Subbarami Reddy | G. V. Iyer | |
| 1993 (41st) | Charachar | Bengali | Gita Gope and Shankar Gope | Buddhadeb Dasgupta | |
| 1994 (42nd) | Unishe April | Bengali | Renu Roy | Rituparno Ghosh | |
| 1995 (43rd) | Kathapurushan | Malayalam | Adoor Gopalakrishnan | Adoor Gopalakrishnan | |
| 1996 (44th) | Lal Darja | Bengali | Chitrani Lahiri and Dulal Roy | Buddhadeb Dasgupta | |
| 1997 (45th) | Thaayi Saheba | Kannada | Jayamala | Girish Kasaravalli | |
| 1998 (46th) | Samar | Hindi | Shyam Benegal, Sahyadri Films, and NFDC | Shyam Benegal | |
| 1999 (47th) | Vanaprastham | Malayalam | Mohanlal | Shaji N. Karun | |
| 2000 (48th) | Shantham | Malayalam | P. V. Gangadharan | Jayaraj | |
| 2001 (49th) | Dweepa | Kannada | Soundarya | Girish Kasaravalli | |
| 2002 (50th) | Mondo Meyer Upakhyan | Bengali | Arya Bhattacharya | Buddhadeb Dasgupta | |
| 2003 (51st) | Shwaas | Marathi | Arun Nalawade | Sandeep Sawant | |
| 2004 (52nd) | Page 3 | Hindi | Bobby Pushkarna | Madhur Bhandarkar | |
| 2005 (53rd) | Kaalpurush | Bengali | Jhamu Sughand | Buddhadeb Dasgupta | |
| 2006 (54th) | Pulijanmam | Malayalam | M. G. Vijay | Priyanandanan | |
| 2007 (55th) | Kanchivaram | Tamil | Percept Picture Company | Priyadarshan | |
| 2008 (56th) | Antaheen | Bengali | Screenplay Films | Aniruddha Roy Chowdhury | |
| 2009 (57th) | Kutty Srank | Malayalam | Reliance Big Pictures | Shaji N. Karun | |
| 2010 (58th) | Adaminte Makan Abu | Malayalam | Salim Ahamed and Ashraf Bedi | Salim Ahamed | |
| 2011 (59th) | Deool | Marathi | Abhijeet Gholap | Umesh Vinayak Kulkarni | |
| 2011 (59th) | Byari | Beary | Altaaf Hussain | K. P. Suveeran | |
| 2012 (60th) | Paan Singh Tomar | Hindi | UTV Software Communications | Tigmanshu Dhulia | |
| 2013 (61st) | Ship of Theseus | English | Recyclewala Films Pvt. Ltd. | Anand Gandhi | |
| 2014 (62nd) | Court | Marathi | Zoo Entertainment Pvt. Ltd. | Chaitanya Tamhane | |
| 2015 (63rd) | Baahubali: The Beginning | Telugu | Shobu Yarlagadda and Arka Media Works | S. S. Rajamouli | |
| 2016 (64th) | Kaasav | Marathi | Sumitra Bhave, Sunil Sukthankar, and Mohan Agashe | Sumitra Bhave and Sunil Sukthankar | |
| 2017 (65th) | Village Rockstars | Assamese | Rima Das | Rima Das | |
| 2018 (66th) | Hellaro | Gujarati | Saarthi Productions LLP | Abhishek Shah | |
| 2019 (67th) | Marakkar: Lion of the Arabian Sea | Malayalam | Antony Perumbavoor | Priyadarshan | |
| 2020 (68th) | Soorarai Pottru | Tamil | 2D Entertainment | Sudha Kongara | |
| 2021 (69th) | Rocketry: The Nambi Effect | Hindi | Rocketry Entertainment LLP | R. Madhavan | |
| 2022 (70th) | Aattam | Malayalam | Joy Movie Productions | Anand Ekarshi | |
| 2023 (71st) | 12th Fail | Hindi | Vinod Chopra Films | Vidhu Vinod Chopra | |
| 2024 (72nd) | Article 370 | Hindi | B62 Studios and Jio Studios | Aditya Suhas Jambhale | |
