= The Hymn of Samadhi =

Song by Swami Vivekananda

The Hymn of Samadhi (Nahi Surjo, Nahi Jyoti)
- by Swami Vivekananda
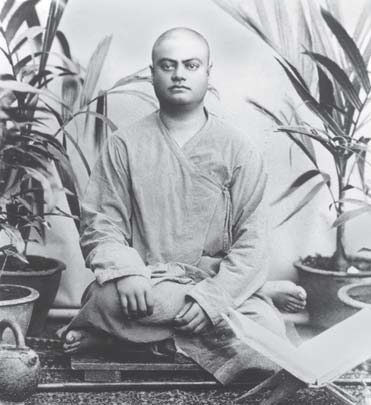
- Vivekananda in Madras in 1887
- Country: India
- Language: Bengali

The Hymn of Samadhi or A Hymn of Samadhi is a song written by Swami Vivekananda. The song was originally written in Bengali as Nahi surjo, nahi jyoti or Pralay. Later the song was translated into English and was added into "The Complete Works of Swami Vivekananda" as The Hymn of Samadhi.

In this song, Vivekananda attempts to narrate the experiences of Nirvikalpa Samadhi and rediscover the real self (Known as Atman in Hindu Advaita Vedantic Philosophy) the "I". The song has been sung by various artistes. The song was used in the 2013 biopic The Light: Swami Vivekananda.

== Song ==
English
The Hymn of Samadhi (excerpt)

Lo! The sun is not, nor the comely moon,
All light extinct; in the great void of space
Floats shadow-like the image-universe.

In the void of mind involute, there floats
The fleeting universe, rises and floats,
Sinks again, ceaseless, in the current "I".

- Read the full song at Wikisource
Bengali

নাহি সূর্য নাহি জ্যোতিঃ নাহি শশাঙ্ক সুন্দর।
ভাসে ব্যোমে ছায়া-সম ছবি বিশ্ব-চরাচর॥
অস্ফুট মন আকাশে, জগত সংসার ভাসে,
ওঠে ভাসে ডুবে পুনঃ অহং-স্রোতে নিরন্তর॥
ধীরে ধীরে ছায়া-দল, মহালয়ে প্রবেশিল,
বহে মাত্র ‘আমি আমি’ — এই ধারা অনুক্ষণ॥
সে ধারাও বদ্ধ হল, শূন্যে শূন্য মিলাইল,
‘অবাঙমনসোগোচরম্’, বোঝে — প্রাণ বোঝে যার॥

== Theme ==
In the song Vivekananda tries to narrate the experiences of Nirvikalpa Samadhi. To explain Nirvikalpa Samadhi, he says, (during Nirvikalpa Samadhi), he experiences an environment where he sees neither the Sun, nor the moon, nor any kind of light. He observes the whole universe as floating in the sky like a shadow. He sees the universe— rising, floating and sinking— and this goes on ceaselessly. Very slowly, the shadow-multitude enters the primal-womb, and only the current remains, which keeps on buzzing— "I am", "I am". Slowly, that current ceases too, "void merges into void" and he experiences a stage of samadhi which, he feels, is Abngmanasagocharam (beyond mind and speech).

Vivekananda talked on Nirvikalpa Samadhi on another occasion—

If the creation is false, then you can also regard the Nirvikalpa Samadhi of Jiva and his return therefrom as seeming appearances. Jiva is Brahman by his nature. How can he have any experience of bondage? Your desire to realise the truth that you are Brahman is also a hallucination in that case -- for the scripture says, "You are already that." Therefore, "(Sanskrit)— this is verily your bondage that you are practising the attainment of Samadhi."

== Composition ==
The Bengali song is sung in Bageshri raga and Aara Theka Tala.

=== Adaptations ===
The song has been performed by several artistes like Dr.K.J. Yesudas, Anup Ghoshal, Ajoy Chakrabarty, Srikanto Acharya, Anup Jalota etc. The song was included in the Ramakrishna Mission audio CD Veer Vani.

The song was adapted in the 2013 film The Light: Swami Vivekananda. In this film, the song was sung by Nachiketa Chakraborty.
