= Madhvacharya (film) =

- VCD cover
- Directed by: G. V. Iyer
- Screenplay by: G. V. Iyer; Sri Bannanje Govindacharya
- Produced by: Ananthalakshmi Films
- Cinematography: Madhu Ambat
- Edited by: V. R. K. Prasad
- Music by: M. Balamuralikrishna
- Distributed by: Ananthalakshmi Films
- Release date: 1986
- Country: India
- Language: Kannada

Madhvacharya is a 1986 Indian Kannada-language film directed by G. V. Iyer. The film is based on the life and teachings of the founder of the Tattvavada philosophy, Madhvacharya. It was produced by Ananthalakshmi Films. The film won the National Award for M. Balamuralikrishna as the Best Music Director. This film screened at the 11th IFFI panorama.

== Plot ==
The film is based on the life of Madhvacharya, a Vaishnavite scholar.

== Cast and crew ==
=== Cast ===
- Purna Prasad as adult Madhvacharya
- Avinash as teen Madhvacharya
- Shrivathsa as Vasudeva/Bala Madhva
- Vijaya Shri as Baby Vasudeva
- G. M. Krishnamurthy as Achyuta Prajna
- Hayagrivachar as Pandit Trivikrama
- G. V. Shivanand as Vedavyasa
- Aanda Teertha as Ravindra

=== Crew ===
- Director : G. V. Iyer
- Screenplay : G. V. Iyer, Sri Bannanje Govindacharya
- Cinematographer : Madhu Ambat
- Editing : V. R. K. Prasad
- Music direction : M. Balamuralikrishna
- Art Direction : P. Krishnamurthy
- Sound : Kitty Govindaswamy

== Soundtrack ==
All lyrics are written by Madhwacharya; all music is composed by M. Balamuralikrishna.

No.	Title	Singer(s)	Length
1.	"Vande vandyam"	M. Balamuralikrishna	5:30
