= Tabarana Kathe =

- Directed by: Girish Kasaravalli
- Written by: Poornachandra Tejaswi
- Screenplay by: Girish Kasaravalli
- Produced by: Girish Kasaravalli
- Starring: Charuhasan; Nalini Murthy; R. Nagesh
- Cinematography: Madhu Ambat
- Edited by: M. N. Swamy
- Music by: L. Vaidyanathan
- Distributed by: Apoorva Chithra
- Release date: 1987
- Running time: 110 minutes
- Country: India
- Language: Kannada

Tabarana Kathe (Tabara's Tale) is a 1987 Indian Kannada-language film released directed by Girish Kasaravalli. It was based on a short story of the same name by Poornachandra Tejaswi. Film historian S. Theodore Baskaran picked Tabarana Kathe in Rediff.com's ten best Indian films of all time.

== Plot ==
Tabarana Kathe is the story of Tabara Shetty, a watchman in the employ of the government. He serves the government till his retirement. He is a dedicated worker and respects the system that sustained him for so long. But problems emerge after his retirement.

Tabara never gets his pension money. In his failing old age, Tabara approaches the officials he had served. Except for a few sympathisers, nobody helps Tabara get his pension. Matters worsen when his wife and only companion falls sick with diabetes. She has a sore foot which becomes gangrenous. Tabara tries all means to get his pension to treat his wife. After a few months, his wife dies. The pension money arrives after that. Tabara curses his higher officials and the system which ruined his life.

== Cast ==
- Charuhasan as Tabara Shetty
- Nalina Murty
- Santosh Nandavanam
- Hasakru

== Production ==
The film was shot in Mudigere in Chickmagalur district of Karnataka.

== Awards and screenings ==
Tabarana Kathe was screened at film festivals including Tashkent, Nantes, Tokyo and the Film Festival of Russia.

34th National Film Awards

- Best Feature Film - Tabarana Kathe
- Best Actor — Charuhasan

Karnataka State Film Awards 1986-87

- First Best Film
- Best Director — Girish Kasaravalli
- Best Story — Poornachandra Tejaswi
- Best Dialogue — Poornachandra Tejaswi
- Best Actor — Charuhasan
- Best Editing — M. N. Swamy
- Best Child Actor — Santosh Nandavanam
