= Shodh =

- Directed by: Biplab Roy Chowdhury
- Produced by: Sitakant Misra
- Starring: Om Puri
- Music by: Santanu Mohapatra
- Release date: 1979
- Country: India
- Language: Hindi

Shodh (transl. Discovery or Finding) is a 1979 Indian Bollywood ghost movie directed by Biplab Roy Chowdhury and produced by Sitakant Misra, based on the Bengali book Gorom Bhat O Nichhok Bhooter Goppo (transl. A story of hot rice and mere ghosts) by Sunil Gangopadhyay.

== Plot ==
Surendra, having been exiled from his village in youth and established himself in the city, comes back to the news of his father's demise, reportedly at the hands of a phantom. He announces a prize for anyone who succeeds in showing him a ghost, which attracts the greed of the poor hungry peasants, resulting in the accusations of innocent people as haunted, and even murders with the hope of producing a ghost.

== Cast ==
- Om Puri – Surendra

== Awards ==
- 1980 – National Film Award for Best Feature Film
- 1980 – National Film Award for Best Cinematography – Rajan Kinagi
