= Madhu Ambat =

Indian cinematographer

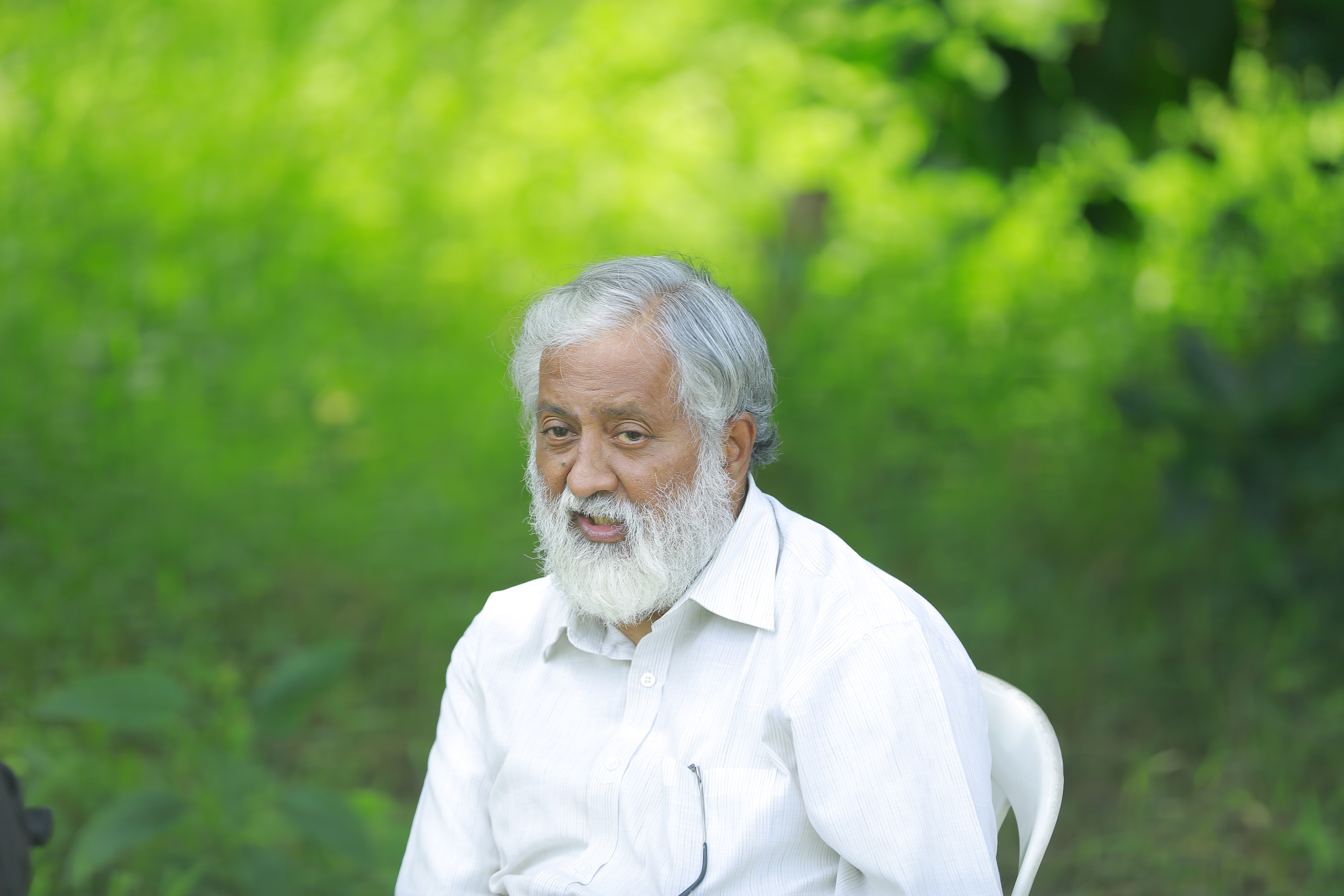
- Born: 6 March 1949 (age 77); Ernakulam, Kerala, India
- Education: Film and Television Institute of India
- Occupations: Cinematographer, documentary producer, film director
- Parent(s): K. Bhagyanath; Sulochana
- Website: www.madhuambat.com

Madhu Ambat ISC (born 6 March 1949) is an Indian cinematographer who predominantly works in Malayalam and Tamil-language films apart from a few English, Hindi, Telugu, Kannada, Bengali and Sanskrit films. With a career spanning over 40 years, he is one of the most prolific cinematographers in Indian cinema. He is best known for his work in films such as Amaram, Anjali, and Makaramanju. He currently resides in Chennai, Tamil Nadu. He has won the National Film Award for Best Cinematography thrice. He is a member of the Indian Society of Cinematographers (ISC).

Madhu's father, K. Bhagyanath, resigned as a Professor of English to be a full-time magician. Bhagyanath was also an amateur photographer. Bhagyanath and his wife Sulochana believed that one should take the profession one liked best. Madhu got admission to IIT and at the same time, he was selected in Pune Film Institute. Despite all hindrances from their relatives, Madhu's parents allowed him to join the Film institute, and he sustained the faith of his parents in him by achieving a gold medal at the institute. All these helped Madhu take cinematography as his profession. Madhu, who started his career with a documentary for famous director Ramu Kariat, has been a cinematographer for over 250 films. His younger sister is the actress and dancer Vidhubala.

In 2003, he completed 1:1.6 An Ode to Lost Love, his debut film as a director.

== Filmography ==
- 1975 - Love Letter
- 1977 - Njaaval Pazhangal as Madhu-Shaji
- 1978 - Manushyan as Madhu-Shaji
- 1978 - Kudhira Motte
- 1978 - Nalegannu Maduvavaru
- 1978 - Prema Kama
- 1978 - Ithihasa
- 1978 - Saritha
- 1978 - Ashwathama
- 1978 - Yaro Oral
- 1979 - Hridhayathil Nee Mathram
- 1979 - Pichipoo
- 1980 - Oppol
- 1980 - Saraswathi Yaamam
- 1980 - Sooryante Maranum
- 1980 - Seetha
- 1982 - Lahari as Madhu-Shaji
- 1983 - Adi Shankaracharya
- 1983 - Phaniyamma (Kannada)
- 1984 - Sandhya Mayangum Neram
- 1984 - Swantham Sarika
- 1986 - Tabarana Kathe (Kannada)
- 1986 - Uppu
- 1987 - Swathi Thirunal
- 1988 - Vaishali
- 1989 - Vachanam
- 1990 - Anjali (Tamil)
- 1990 - Disha (Hindi)
- 1990 - Sutradhaarulu (Telugu)
- 1991 - Amaram
- 1992 - Daivathinte Vikrithikal, Rajashilpi
- 1992 - Praying with Anger (English)
- 1992 - Swaroopam
- 1993 - Bhagvad Gita (Sanskrit)
- 1993 - Magrib
- 1993 - Padheyam
- 1994 - Nammavar (Tamil)
- 1994 - Swami Vivekananda (English)
- 1994 - Amodini (Bengali)
- 1997 - Churam
- 1997 - Kulam
- 1997 - Bapa
- 1999 - Khoobsurat (Hindi)
- 1999 - Thammudu (Telugu)
- 2000 - Badri (Telugu)
- 2001 - Lajja (Hindi)
- 2003 - Anyar
- 2003 - Chupke Se (Hindi)
- 2003 - Avuna (Telugu)
- 2004 - Chanakya
- 2004 - 1:1.6 An Ode to Lost Love - screenplay, direction, & cinematography
- 2004 - Pravahi (Documentary short)
- 2005 - June R (Tamil)
- 2006 - Aadum Koothu (Tamil)
- 2006 - Provoked: A True Story (English)
- 2007 - Shoot on Sight (English)
- 2007 - Sringaram (Tamil)
- 2008 - Maan Gaye Mughal-e-Azam
- 2009 - Kerala Cafe (segment "Makal")
- 2010 - Graamam
- 2010 - Hisss
- 2010 - Makaramanju
- 2011 - Adaminte Makan Abu
- 2012 - Kalikaalam
- 2013 - Kunjananthante Kada
- 2013 - Thee Kulikkum Pachai Maram (Tamil)
- 2014 - Namma Gramam (Tamil)
- 2014 - Sivappu (Tamil)
- 2015 - Pathemari
- 2018 - Pani - Fever
- 2018 - And the Oscar Goes To...
- 2020 - Itlu Amma
- 2023 - Appatha (Tamil)
- 2025 - Jora Kaiya Thattunga (Tamil)
- 2025 - Paranu Paranu Paranu Chellan
- 2025 - Mindiyum Paranjum

== Awards ==
National Film Awards

- 1984: Best Cinematography - Adi Sankaracharya (Sanskrit)
- 2006: Best Cinematography - Sringaram (Tamil)
- 2010: Best Cinematography - Adaminte Makan Abu (Malayalam)

Kerala State Film Awards

- 1978: Aswathama, Sooryante Maranam and Yaro Oral
- 1987: Purushartham, Swathi Thirunal
- 1990: Amaram
- 2018: Pani, And the Oscar Goes To

Nandi Awards

- 1990: Nandi Award for Best Cinematographer - Hrudayanjali

South Indian International Movie Awards

- 2012: SIIMA Award for Best Cinematographer - Makaramanju

Asianet Film Awards

- 2012: Best Cinematographer - Adaminte Makan Abu
- 2013 - Asiavision Awards - Best Cinematographer
