= 63rd National Film Awards =

Indian ceremony recognizing films of 2015

- Awarded for: Best of Indian cinema in 2015
- Awarded by: Directorate of Film Festivals
- Presented by: Pranab Mukherjee (President of India)
- Announced on: 28 March 2016
- Presented on: 3 May 2016
- Official website: dff.nic.in

Highlights
- Best Feature Film: Baahubali: The Beginning
- Best Non-Feature Film: Amdavad Ma Famous
- Best Book: Dr. Rajkumar Samagra Charithre
- Best Film Critic: Meghachandra Kongbam
- Dadasaheb Phalke Award: Manoj Kumar
- Most awards: Bajirao Mastani (7)

The 63rd National Film Awards was an award ceremony during which the Directorate of Film Festivals of India presented its annual National Film Awards to honour the best films of 2015 in Indian cinema. The awards were announced on 28 March 2016 and the ceremony was held on 3 May 2016.

== Selection process ==
The Directorate of Film Festivals invited nominations for the awards in January 2016. The acceptable last date for entries was until 13 January 2016. Feature and Non-Feature Films certified by the Central Board of Film Certification between 1 January 2015 and 31 December 2015 were eligible for the film award categories. Books, critical studies, reviews or articles on cinema published in Indian newspapers, magazines, and journals published between 1 January 2015 and 31 December 2015 were eligible for the best writing on cinema section. Entries of dubbed, revised or copied versions of a film or translation, abridgements, edited or annotated works and reprints were ineligible for the awards.

For the Feature and Non-Feature Films sections, films in any Indian language, shot on 16 mm, 35 mm, a wider film gauge or a digital format, and released in cinemas, on video or digital formats for home viewing were eligible. Films were required to be certified as a feature film, a featurette or a Documentary/Newsreel/Non-Fiction by the Central Board of Film Certification.

== Best Film Friendly State ==
The awards aim at encouraging study and appreciation of cinema as an art form and dissemination of information and critical appreciation of this art-form through a State Government Policy.

Award	Name of State	Citation
Best Film Friendly State	State of Gujarat	Film Policy for Promotion of Gujarati Cinema.

== Dadasaheb Phalke Award ==
Introduced in 1969, the Dadasaheb Phalke Award is the highest award given to recognise the contributions of film personalities towards the development of Indian cinema and for distinguished contributions to the medium, its growth and promotion.

A committee consisting five eminent personalities from Indian film industry was appointed to evaluate the lifetime achievement award, Dadasaheb Phalke Award. Following were the jury members.

- Jury Members

• Lata Mangeshkar
• Asha Bhosle
• Nitin Mukesh
• Salim Khan
• Anup Jalota

Name of Award	Image	Awardee(s)	Awarded As	Awards
Dadasaheb Phalke Award		Manoj Kumar	Actor, filmmaker	Swarna Kamal, ₹1 million (US$10,000) and a Shawl

== Feature films ==
Feature films will be awarded at All India as well as regional level. Following will be the awards given in each category:

=== Juries ===
A committee headed by Ramesh Sippy was appointed to evaluate the feature films awards. Following were the jury members:

- Jury Members
  - Ramesh Sippy (Chairperson) • Gangai Amaran • Sandip Datta • John Matthew Matthan • Dharam Gulati • Gyan Sahay • S. R. Leela • K. Vasu • Satish Kaushik • Shyamaprasad • Munin Barua

=== All India Award ===
Following will be the awards given:

==== Golden Lotus Award ====
Official Name: Swarna Kamal

All the awardees are awarded with 'Golden Lotus Award (Swarna Kamal)', a certificate and cash prize.

Name of Award	Name of Film	Language	Awardee(s)	Cash prize
Best Feature Film	Baahubali: The Beginning	Telugu (Note: The language was not mentioned on the National Award entry, and the film was also made in Tamil.)	Producer: Shobu Yarlagadda & Arka Media Works (P) LTD. director: S. S. Rajamouli	₹ 250,000/- Each
Best Debut Film of a Director	Masaan	Hindi	Producer: Phantom Films; Director: Neeraj Ghaywan	₹ 1,25,000/- Each
Best Popular Film Providing Wholesome Entertainment	Bajrangi Bhaijaan	Hindi	Producer: Salman Khan & Rockline Venkatesh; Director: Kabir Khan	₹ 200,000/- Each
Best Children's Film	Duronto	Hindi	Producer: Code Red Films; Director: Soumendra Padhi	₹ 150,000/- Each
Best Direction	Bajirao Mastani	Hindi	Sanjay Leela Bhansali	₹ 250,000/-

==== Silver Lotus Award ====
Official Name: Rajat Kamal

All the awardees are awarded with 'Silver Lotus Award (Rajat Kamal)', a certificate and cash prize.

Name of Award	Name of Film	Language	Awardee(s)	Cash prize
Best Feature Film on National Integration	Nanak Shah Fakir	Punjabi	Producer: Gurbani Media; Director: –	₹ 150,000/- Each for
Best Film on Other Social Issues	Nirnayakam	Malayalam	Producer: Jayraj Films; Director: V. K. Prakash	₹ 150,000/- Each
Best Film on Environment/Conservation/Preservation	Valiya Chirakulla Pakshikal	Malayalam	Producer: Dr. A. K. Pillai; Director: Dr. Biju	₹ 150,000/- Each
Best Actor	Piku	Hindi	Amitabh Bachchan	₹ 50,000/-
Best Actress	Tanu Weds Manu Returns	Hindi	Kangana Ranaut	₹ 50,000/-
Best Supporting Actor	Visaranai	Tamil	Samuthirakani	₹ 50,000/-
Best Supporting Actress	Bajirao Mastani	Hindi	Tanvi Azmi	₹ 50,000/-
Best Child Artist	Ben	Malayalam	Gourav Menon	₹ 50,000/-
Best Male Playback Singer	Katyar Kaljat Ghusali (For the song "Aruni Kirani")	Marathi	Mahesh Kale	₹ 50,000/-
Best Female Playback Singer	Dum Laga Ke Haisha (For the song "Moh Moh Ke Dhaage")	Hindi	Monali Thakur	₹ 50,000/-
Best Cinematography	Bajirao Mastani	Hindi	Sudeep Chatterjee	₹ 50,000/-
Best Screenplay • Screenplay Writer (Original)	Piku	Hindi	Juhi Chaturvedi	₹ 50,000/-
Best Screenplay • Screenplay Writer (Original)	Tanu Weds Manu Returns	Hindi	Himanshu Sharma	₹ 50,000/-
Best Screenplay • Screenplay Writer (Adapted)	Talvar	Hindi	Vishal Bhardwaj	₹ 50,000/-
Best Screenplay • Dialogues	Piku	Hindi	Juhi Chaturvedi	₹ 50,000/-
Best Screenplay • Dialogues	Tanu Weds Manu Returns	Hindi	Himanshu Sharma	₹ 50,000/-
Best Audiography • Location Sound Recordist	Talvar	Hindi	Sanjay Kurian	₹ 50,000/-
Best Audiography • Sound designer	Bajirao Mastani	Hindi	Biswadeep Chatterjee	₹ 50,000/-
Best Audiography • Re-recordist of the Final Mixed Track	Bajirao Mastani	Hindi	Justin Jose	₹ 50,000/-
Best Editing	Visaranai	Tamil	Kishore Te	₹ 50,000/-
Best Art Direction	Bajirao Mastani	Hindi	• Shriram Iyengar • Saloni Dhatrak • Sujeet Sawant	₹ 50,000/-
Best Costume Design	Nanak Shah Fakir	Punjabi	Payal Saluja	₹ 50,000/-
Best Make-up Artist	Nanak Shah Fakir	Punjabi	• Preetisheel Singh • Clover Wootton	₹ 50,000/-
Best Music Direction • Songs	Ennu Ninte Moideen (For the song "Kathirunnu")	Malayalam	M. Jayachandran	₹ 50,000/-
Best Music Direction • Background Score	Tharai Thappattai	Tamil	Ilaiyaraaja	₹ 50,000/-
Best Lyrics	Dum Laga Ke Haisha (For the song "Moh Moh Ke Dhaage")	Hindi	Varun Grover	₹ 50,000/-
Best Special Effects	Baahubali: The Beginning	Telugu	V. Srinivas Mohan	₹ 50,000/-
Best Choreography	Bajirao Mastani (For the song "Deewani Mastani")	Hindi	Remo D'Souza	₹ 50,000/-
Special Jury Award	Margarita with a Straw	Hindi	Kalki Koechlin (Actress)	₹ 200,000/-
Special Mention	Sairat	Marathi	Rinku Rajguru (Actress)	Certificate only
Special Mention	• Su Su Sudhi Vathmeekam • Lukka Chuppi	Malayalam	Jayasurya (Actor)	Certificate only
Special Mention	Irudhi Suttru	Tamil	Ritika Singh (Actress)	Certificate only

=== Regional Awards ===
The award is given to best film in the regional languages of India.

Name of Award	Name of Film	Awardee(s)		Cash prize
Name of Award	Name of Film	Producer(s)	Director	Cash prize
Best Feature Film in Assamese	Kothanodi	Anurupa Hazarika	Bhaskar Hazarika	₹ 100,000/- Each
Best Feature Film in Bengali	Shankhachil	Nideas Creations & Productions Pvt Ltd	Goutam Ghose	₹ 100,000/- Each
Best Feature Film in Bodo	Dau Huduni Methai	Shankarlal Goenka	Manju Borah	₹ 100,000/- Each
Best Feature Film in Hindi	Dum Laga Ke Haisha	• Maneesh Sharma • Yash Raj Films	Sharat Katariya	₹ 100,000/- Each
Best Feature Film in Kannada	Thithi	Prspctvs Productions Pvt Ltd.	Raam Reddy	₹ 100,000/- Each
Best Feature Film in Konkani	Enemy	A. Durga Prasad	Dinesh P. Bhonsle	₹ 100,000/- Each
Best Feature Film in Maithili	Mithila Makhaan	• Neetu Chandra • Samir Kumar	Nitin Chandra	₹ 100,000/- Each
Best Feature Film in Malayalam	Pathemari	Allens Media	Salim Ahamed	₹ 100,000/- Each
Best Feature Film in Manipuri	Eibusu Yaohanbiyu	Yunman Hitalar (Neta) Singh	Maipaksana Haorongbam	₹ 100,000/- Each
Best Feature Film in Marathi	Ringan	My Role Motion Pictures	Makarand Mane	₹ 100,000/- Each
Best Feature Film in Oriya	Pahada ra luha	Mohapatra Movie Magic Pvt. Ltd.	Sabyasachi Mohapatra	₹ 100,000/- Each
Best Feature Film in Punjabi	Chauthi Koot	• NFDC • Kartikeya Singh	Gurvinder Singh	₹ 100,000/- Each
Best Feature Film in Sanskrit	Priyamanasam	Baby Mathew Somatheeram	Vinod Mankara	₹ 100,000/- Each
Best Feature Film in Tamil	Visaranai	Wunderbar Films	Vetri Maaran	₹ 100,000/- Each
Best Feature Film in Telugu	Kanche	Y. Rajeev Reddy	Radha Krishna Jagarlamudi (Krish)	₹ 100,000/- Each

Best Feature Film in Each of the Language Other Than Those Specified in the Schedule VIII of the Constitution

Name of Award	Name of Film	Awardee(s)		Cash prize
Name of Award	Name of Film	Producer(s)	Director	Cash prize
Best Feature Film in Haryanvi	Satrangi	Punam Deswal Sharma	Sundeep Sharma	₹ 100,000/- Each
Best Feature Film in Khasi	Onaatah	• Pomu Das • Marjina Kurbah	Pradip Kurbah	₹ 100,000/- Each
Best Feature Film in Mizo	Kima's Lode Beyond the Class	Children's Film Society	Zualaa Chhangte	₹ 100,000/- Each
Best Feature Film in Wancho	The Head Hunter	Splash Films Private Limited	Nilanjan Datta	₹ 100,000/- Each

== Non-Feature Films ==
Short Films made in any Indian language and certified by the Central Board of Film Certification as a documentary/newsreel/fiction are eligible for non-feature film section.

=== Golden Lotus Award ===
Official Name: Swarna Kamal

All the awardees were awarded with the 'Golden Lotus Award (Swarna Kamal)', a certificate and cash prize.

Name of Award	Name of Film	Language	Awardee(s)	Cash prize
Best Non-Feature Film	Amdavad Ma Famous	Gujrati	Producer: Akanksha Tewari & Arya A. Menon; Director: Hardik Mehta	₹ 100,000/- Each
Best Non-Feature Film Direction	Kamuki	Malayalam	Producer: Satyajit Ray Film and Television Institute; Director: Christo Tomy	₹ 50,000/- Each

=== Silver Lotus Award ===
Official Name: Rajat Kamal

All the Awardees were awarded with the 'Silver Lotus Award (Rajat Kamal)' and cash prize.

Name of Award	Name of Film	Language	Awardee(s)	Cash prize
Best First Non-Feature Film	Daaravtha	Marathi	Producer: Nishantroy Bombarde; Director: Nishantroy Bombarde	₹ 50,000/- Each
Best Anthropological / Ethnographic Film	Aoleang	English	Producer: Maulana Abul Kalam Azad Institute of Asian Studies; Director: Ranajit Ray Assistant Director: Goutam Sharma	₹ 50,000/- Each
Best Biographical Film / Best Historical Reconstruction / Compilation Film	Life in Metaphors: A Portrait of Girish Kasaravalli	English And Kannada	Producer: Reelism Film; Director: O.P. Shrivastava	₹ 50,000/- Each
Best Arts / Cultural Film	• A Far Afternoon – A Painted Saga • Yazhpanam Thedchanamoorthy – Music Beyond Boundaries	Hindi, English Tamil	Producer: Piramal Art Foundation; Director: Sruti Harihara Subramanian; Producer: Siddhartha Productions; Director: Amshan Kumar	₹ 50,000/- Each (Cash Component to be shared)
Best Environment Film including Best Agricultural Film	• The Man who Dwarfed the Mountains • God on the Edge	Hindi, English English, Bengali	Producer: Rajiv Mehrotra, PSBT; Director: Ruchi Shrivastava & Sumit Sunderlal Khanna; Producer: Elements Picture Studio; Director: Ashok Patel	₹ 50,000/- Each (Cash Component to be shared)
Best Promotional Film	Weaves of Maheshwar	Hindi, English	Producer: Storyloom Films; Director: Keya Vaswani & Nidhi Kamath	₹ 50,000/- Each
Best Film on Social Issues	Auto Driver	Manipuri	Producer: Oinam Doren, Longjam Meena Devi; Director: Longjam Meena Devi	₹ 50,000/- Each
Best Educational / Motivational / Instructional Film	Paywat	Marathi	Producer: Mithunchandra Chaudhari; Director: Nayana Dolas & Mithunchandra Chaudhari	₹ 50,000/- Each
Best Exploration / Adventure Film	Dribbling with their Future	Kannada	Producer: N. Dinesh Raj Kumar & Mathew Verghese; Director: Jacob Verghese	₹ 50,000/- Each
Best Investigative Film	Tezpur 1962	English	Producer: Films Division of India; Director: Samujjal Kashyap	₹ 50,000/- Each
Best Animation Film	Fisherwoman and TukTuk	No Dialogues	Producer: Nilima Eriyat; Director: Suresh Eriyat; Animator: Studio Eeksaurus Productions Private Limited	₹ 50,000/- Each
Best Short Fiction Film	Aushadh	Marathi	Producer: Amol Deshmukh; Director: Amol Deshmukh	₹ 50,000/- Each
Best Film on Family Welfare	Best Friends Forever	English	Producer: Syed Sultan Ahmed (Edumedia India Pvt. Ltd.); Director: Sandeep Modi	₹ 50,000/- Each
Best Cinematography	Benaras- The Unexplored Attachments	Bengali	Cameraman: Amartya Bhattacharyya; Laboratory Processing:	₹ 50,000/- Each
Best Audiography	Edpa Kana	Kudukh	Moumita Roy	₹ 50,000/-
Best Editing	Breaking Free	English	Parvin Angre and Sridhar Rangayan	₹ 50,000/-
Best Music Direction	A Far Afternoon- A Painted Saga	Hindi, English	Aravind – Shankar	₹ 50,000/-
Special Jury Award	In Search Of Fading Canvas	Hindi	Producer: Films Division; Director: Manohar Singh Bisht	₹ 50,000/- Each
Special Mention	The Chameleone	English	Arun Shankar	Certificate only
Special Mention	Amma	Malayalam	Neelan	Certificate only
Special Mention	Syaahi	Marathi	Varun Tandon	Certificate only

== Best Writing on Cinema ==
The awards aim at encouraging study and appreciation of cinema as an art form and dissemination of information and critical appreciation of this art-form through publication of books, articles, reviews etc.

=== Golden Lotus Award ===
Official Name: Swarna Kamal

All the awardees are awarded with the 'Golden Lotus Award (Swarna Kamal)' and cash prize.

Name of Award	Name of Book	Language	Awardee(s)	Cash prize
Best Book on Cinema	Dr. Rajkumar Samagra Charithre	Kannada	Author: Doddahulluru Rukkoji Publisher: Preeti Pustaka Prakashana	₹ 75,000/- Each
Best Film Critic	NA	Manipuri	Meghachandra Kongbam	₹ 75,000/-
Special Mention (Book on Cinema)	Forgotten Masters of Hindi Cinema		Author: Satish Chopra	Certificate Only
