= Mahamastakabhisheka =

Duodecennial Jain festival involving large-scale anointment of Jain images

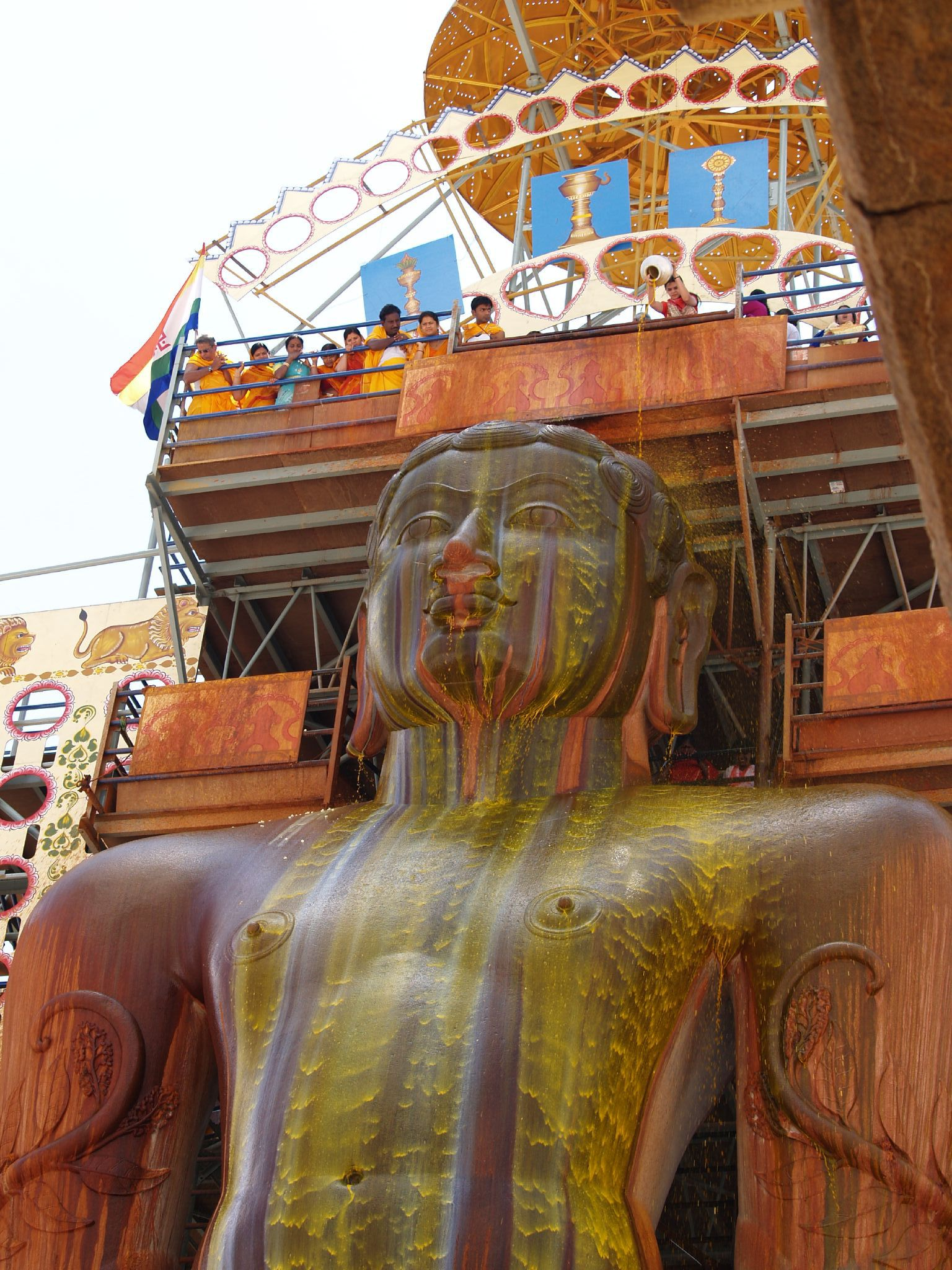
- Anointing of the Gommateshwara statue in 2006
- Also called: Translation: Head Anointing of Gommateshwara
- Observed by: Jains
- Type: Religious
- Significance: Completion of the statue of Gommateshwara statue
- Celebrations: Anointing the statue of Gommateshwara with milk, saffron, sugarcane juice, sandal paste, rice flour, flowers etc.
- Observances: Prayers, Jain rituals
- Date: Decided by the luni-solar Jain calendar
- Frequency: every 12 years

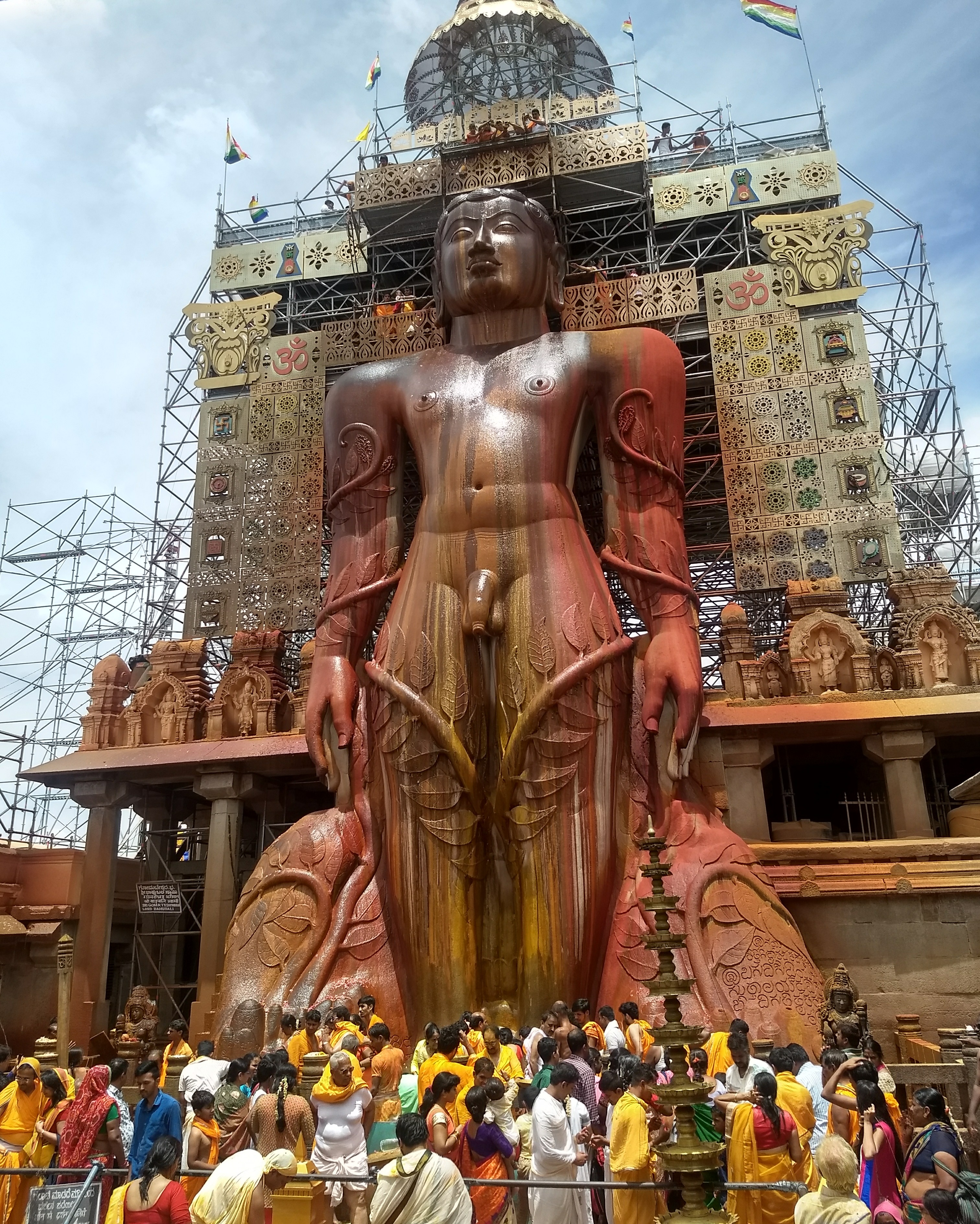
Gommateshwara statue during the Grand Consecration in August 2018

The Māhāmastakābhiṣeka ("Grand Consecration") refers to the abhiṣeka (anointment) of the Jain idols when held on a large scale. The most famous of such consecrations is the anointment of the Bahubali Gommateshwara statue located at Shravanabelagola in Karnataka, India. It is an important Jain festival held once every 12 years. It is an integral part of the ancient and composite Jain tradition.

The festival is held in veneration of a 17.4-metre (57 ft) high monolithic statue of the Siddha Bahubali. The anointing last took place in February 2018, and the next ceremony will take place in 2030. The ceremony in 2018 is said to be the 88th in the series that commenced in the year 981 AD and was the second Mahamastakabhisheka of the 21st century. The ceremony is expected to be graced by numerous Jain ascetics. The February 2018 event was held under the leadership of Charukeerthi Bhattaraka Swamiji of Shravanabelagola from 17 to 25 February 2018. Next will be at 2030 by Abhinava Charukeerthy Bhattaraka Mahaswamiji

== Anointment of the Gommateshwara Bahubali image ==
Bahubali, the son of Rishabhanatha, the first of the twenty-four Jain Tirthankaras, is worshipped for living with exceptional qualities that he displayed during all stages of his life from conception, birth, renunciation, enlightenment and salvation. This 58.8 feet tall statue is the most magnificent among all Jain works of art. It was built in circa 983. The Bahubali statue is described as one of the mightiest achievements of ancient Karnataka in the realm of sculptural art. The statue stands upright in the posture of meditation known as kayotsarga, reaching a height of nearly 57 feet atop the Vindhyagiri - accessible through a flight of 700 steps.

=== Procedure ===
Purified water and sandalwood paste is poured over the statue from a scaffolding. This event continues for weeks. As the Mahamastakabhisheka begins, consecrated water is sprinkled onto the participants by devotees carrying 1,008 specially prepared vessels (kalashas). The statue is then bathed and anointed with libations such as milk, sugarcane juice, and saffron paste, and sprinkled with powders of sandalwood, turmeric, and vermilion. Offerings are made of petals, gold and silver coins, and precious stones. Most recently, the ceremony's finale has included an enormous shower of flowers from a waiting helicopter.

== Other Mahamastakabhishekas ==
Apart from the anointment of the Gommateshwara statue at Shravana Belgola, anointment of the Jaina images take place at Jain temples throughout India. Anointment of the other Gommateshwara statues in Karnataka are also honoured with a Mahamastakabhisheka festival every 12 years.

- Dharmasthala Mahamastakabhisheka was last held from 9 to 18 February 2019. The previous Mahamastakabhishekas were held in 1982, 1995 and 2007.
- Karkala Mahamastakabhisheka - The last Mahamastakabhisheka was held from 21 to 31 January 2015.
- Venur Mahamastakabhisheka - The last one was from 28 January 2012 to 5 February 2012. The next one will be in 2024.
- Kumbhoj Mahamastakabhisheka - The last Mahamastakabhisheka was held in 2015, and the next will be in 2027.

== See also ==
- Jain rituals and festivals
- Panch Kalyanaka
- Jainism in Karnataka
