= Chambal (film) =

2019 Indian Kannada thriller film

- Directed by: Jacob Verghese
- Written by: Jacob Verghese
- Based on: D. K. Ravi
- Produced by: N. Dinesh Rajkumar; Mathew Verghese
- Starring: Sathish Ninasam; Sonu Gowda; Roger Narayan
- Cinematography: D.Sasi Kumar
- Edited by: Bavan Sreekumar
- Music by: Poornachandra Tejaswi; Judah Sandhy
- Production companies: Jacob Films; Jadyan Motion Pictures
- Release date: 22 February 2019
- Country: India
- Language: Kannada

Chambal (lit. 'Chambal' (Note: Region of India infamous for dacoity.)) is a 2019 Indian Kannada thriller film written and directed by Jacob Verghese. It features Satish Ninasam and Sonu Gowda along with Roger Narayan. The supporting cast includes Pawan Kumar, Achyuth Kumar, Kishore Kumar and Elvis Joseph. The score and soundtrack for the film is by Poornachandra Tejaswi and Judah Sandhy and the cinematography is by D. Sasi Kumar and editing is done by Bavan Sreekumar

The film is loosely based on the life of D. K. Ravi.

== Plot ==
The film opens with a mother narrating the legend of Bali Chakravarti, where the King Bali better known for his donations and religious sacrifices, once took over the kingdom of Gods, which had enraged Indra. Indra goes to Lord Vishnu and pleads for help. Then, Vishnu takes over the Vamana Avatar. The god Vishnu came to earth as Vamana, his fifth avatar, to defeat him. Vamana appeared as a dwarflike Brahmin. When the pious Bali tells the lord to keep the third foot on his head, Lord Vishnu does so, and pushes him beneath to the Patala. The son questions his mother, if Bali is dead. The scene cuts ahead.

Subhash is a strict police officer, whose strictness sends shivers across the system. It is shown that the mother shown earlier in the film, is Subhash's mother. He once arrests a corrupt politician, but the Tehsildar who comes to seize the place where the lorries were being taken from, is beaten up by the MLA, and it is revealed that Subhash is the DC.

== Cast ==
- Sathish Ninasam as Subhash
- Sonu Gowda as Lakshmi
- Roger Narayan
- Pawan Kumar
- Achyuth Kumar
- Kishore
- Elvis Joseph
- Girija Lokesh
- Ramesh Bhat
- Puneeth Rajkumar as Narrator

== Soundtrack ==
Chambal

Soundtrack album by Poornachandra Tejaswi, Judah Sandhy
- Genre: Feature film soundtrack
- Language: Kannada
- Label: Zee Music South Company
- Producer: Jacob Verghese

The film's background score and the soundtracks were composed by Poornachandra Tejaswi and Judah Sandhy. The music rights were acquired by Zee Music Company.

All lyrics are written by Jayanth Kaikini, G. P. Rajarathnam, Suni.

Tracklist
| No. | Title | Lyrics | Singer(s) | Length |
|---|---|---|---|---|
| 1. | "Sanchari Hrudaya" | Jayanth Kaykini, G. P. Rajarathnam, Simple Suni | Abhinandan Mahishale, Shreya Iyer | 3:54 |
| 2. | "Kalede Hode Nanu" | Jayanth Kaykini | Udit Haritas | 5:14 |
| 3. | "Rudrathandava" | Keerthi, Louis King | Louis King, Ranjitha | 2:34 |
| 4. | "Shakuni" | G. P. Rajarathnam | Rakshit M. Nagrale | 3:13 |

== Critical reception ==
Vivek M V from the Deccan Herald gave the film 3.5 stars out of 5, saying it "isn't entirely moving but it's a satisfying thriller that keeps you engaged throughout." A Sharadhaa from The New Indian Express also gave the film 3.5 stars out of 5: "This sincere film is a good watch, and director Jacob Verghese's brilliance lies in the way he slowly builds the character of the protagonist, based on late IAS officer DK Ravi."
