= Odegal basadi =

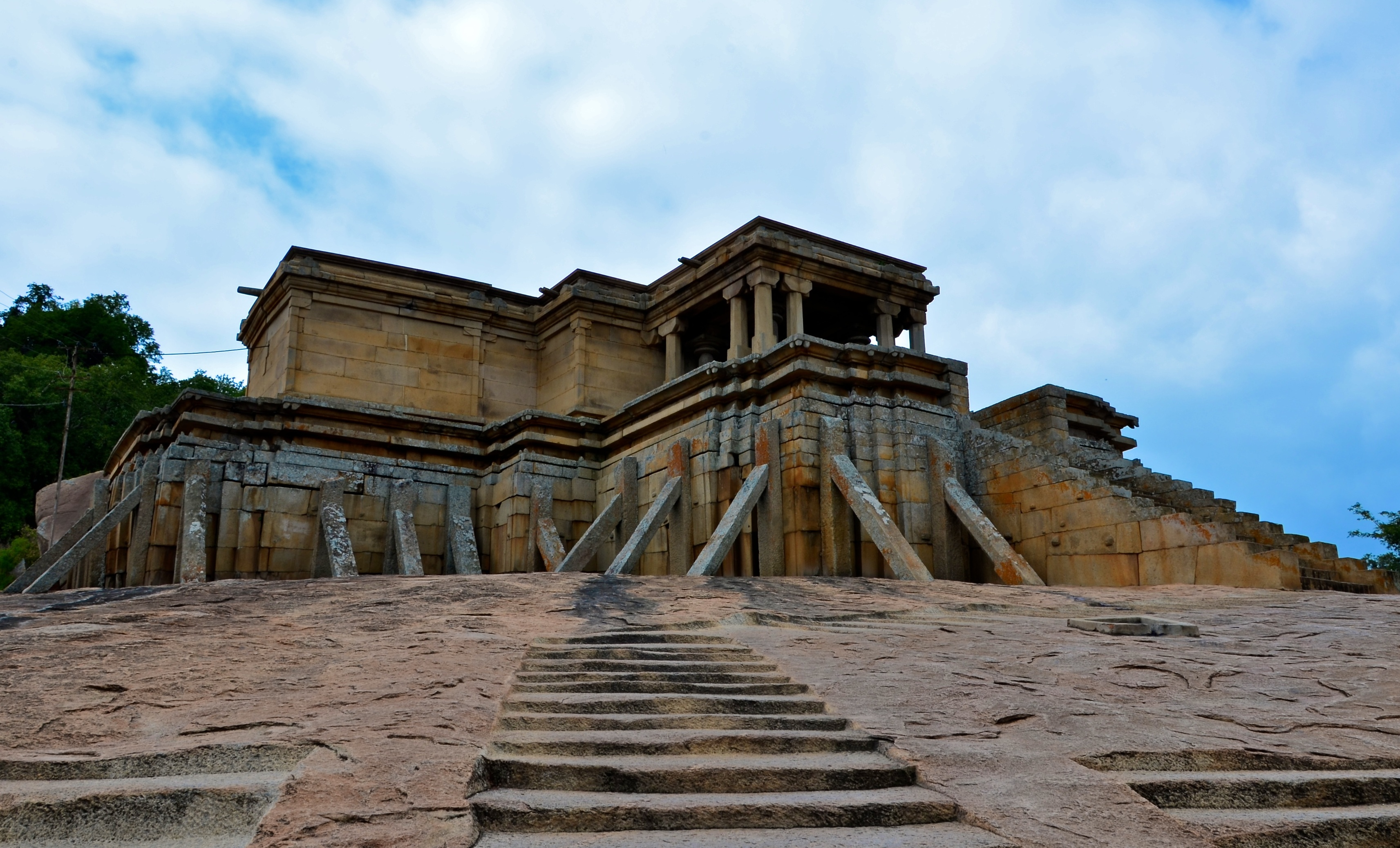
- Odegal Basadi

Religion
- Affiliation: Jainism
- Deity: Rishabhanatha, Neminatha, Shantinatha
- Festival: Mahavir Jayanti

Location
- Location: Shravana Belgola, Hassan, Karnataka
- Interactive map of Odegal basadi
- Coordinates: 12°51′18″N 76°29′06″E

Architecture
- Style: Dravidian architecture
- Established: 14th century

Odegal basadi or Vadegal basadi is the largest basadi located on the Vindhyagiri Hill in Shravanabelagola in the Indian state of Karnataka.

== About temple ==
Odegal basadi is a granite temple built in 14th century and is the largest temple on the Vindhyagiri Hill. The temple derives its name from 'Odega', i.e., soapstone used for strengthening the walls of the temple. The name refers more specifically to the stone supports or props placed against the basement walls of the structure. These supports are a distinctive feature of the exterior of the temple. The temple has three cells facing different directions, giving the name Trirukta Basadi or trikuta Basadi. 'The three sanctuaries are arranged around a common hall, making Odegal Basadi the principal trikuta, or triple-shrine, Jain temple on Vindhyagiri. The temple has splended structure with non-ornate exterior. The temple houses image of Rishabhanatha, Neminatha and Shantinatha made out of dark coloured schist.

The three Jina images correspond to the three sanctuaries of the trikuta plan. Rishabhanatha, also known as Adinatha, occupies the principal shrine, while the other sanctuaries contain images of Neminatha and Shantinatha. Unlike many of the more elaborately decorated Jain monuments at Shravanabelagola, the exterior of Odegal Basadi is comparatively plain, with the architectural emphasis placed on the massive granite construction and triple-shrine arrangement.

The Gommateshwara statue, Siddhara basti, Chennanna basti, and Chauvisa Tirthankara basti are the important temple near Odegal basadi.

== Architecture ==
Odegal Basadi is constructed principally of large granite blocks. Its plan consists of three sanctuaries facing different directions and connected through a common hall. The triple-sanctuary arrangement accounts for the alternative name Trikuta Basadi. The temple is distinguished externally by the stone props placed against the basement walls. These structural supports gave rise to the name Odegal or Vadegal Basadi. The relatively austere exterior contrasts with the dark schist images of the three Tirthankaras housed within the temple.

== Inscriptions ==
A group of inscriptions survives on the exposed rock outside the first entrance of Odegal Basadi. The Mysore Gazetteer records ten inscriptions at this location and describes their characters as older than those of the earliest inscription previously known from Vindhyagiri Hill. These records form part of the much larger corpus of inscriptions at Shravanabelagola, which provides evidence fo the long history of Jain religious activity and patronage at the site. The inscriptions around Odegal Basadi should be distinguished chronologically from the present temple structure: the inscriptions on the surrounding rock include material predating the 14th-century temple.

== Protection ==
The Archaeological Survey of India has listed Odegal Basadi as part of the group of monuments at Shravanabelagola included under the Adarsh Smarak scheme.

== Gallery ==
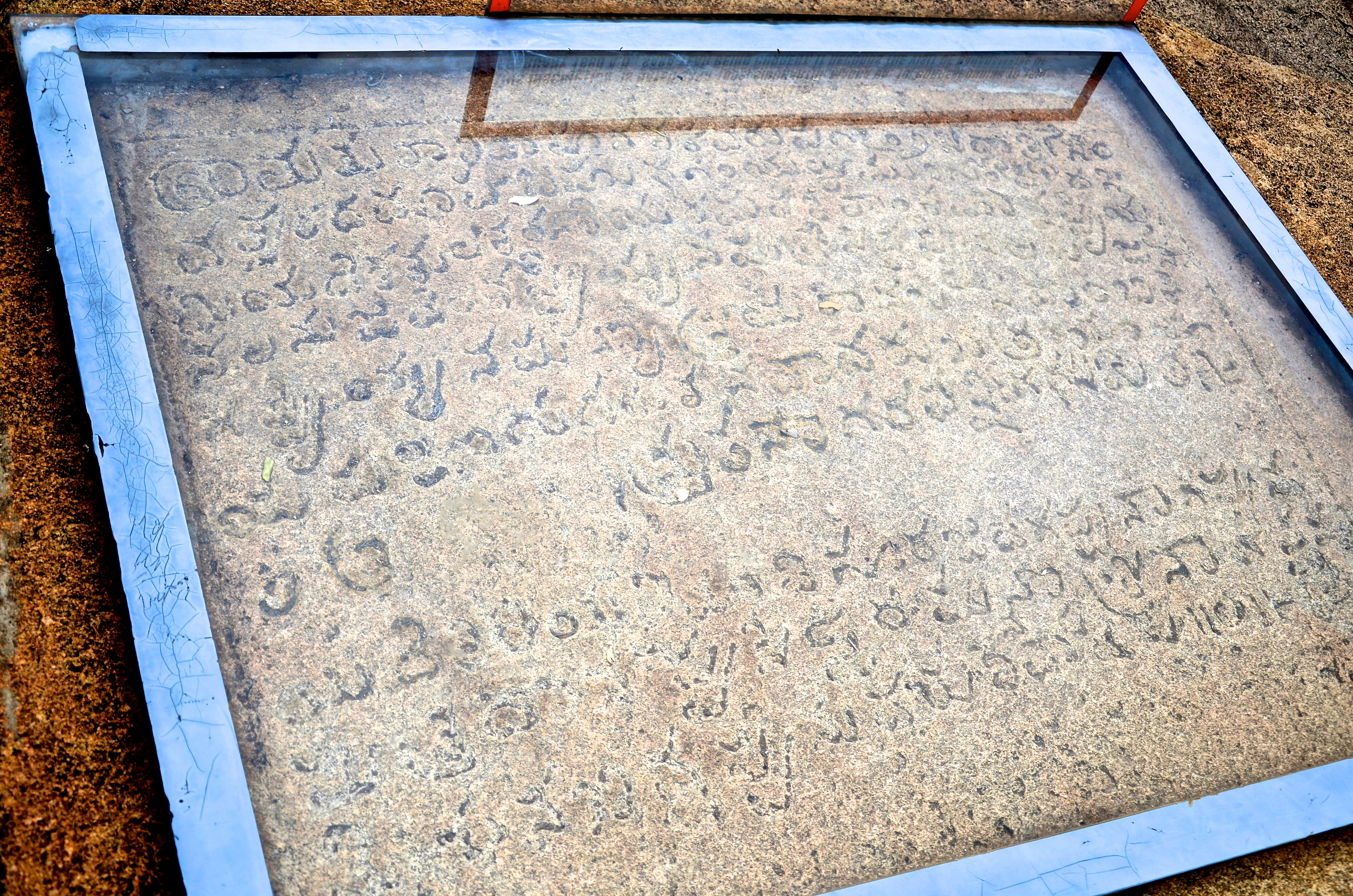
Kannada inscription

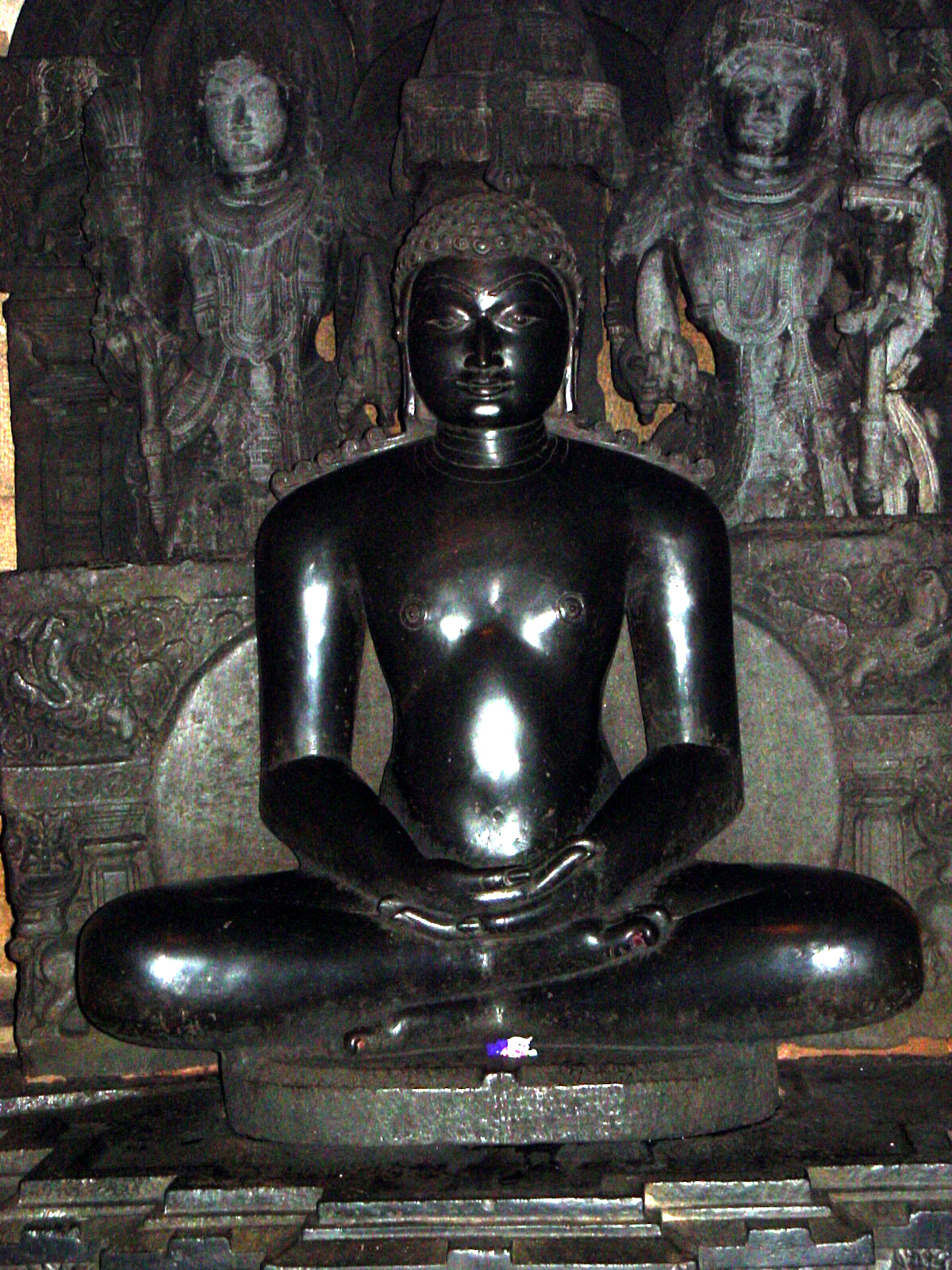
Adinatha statue

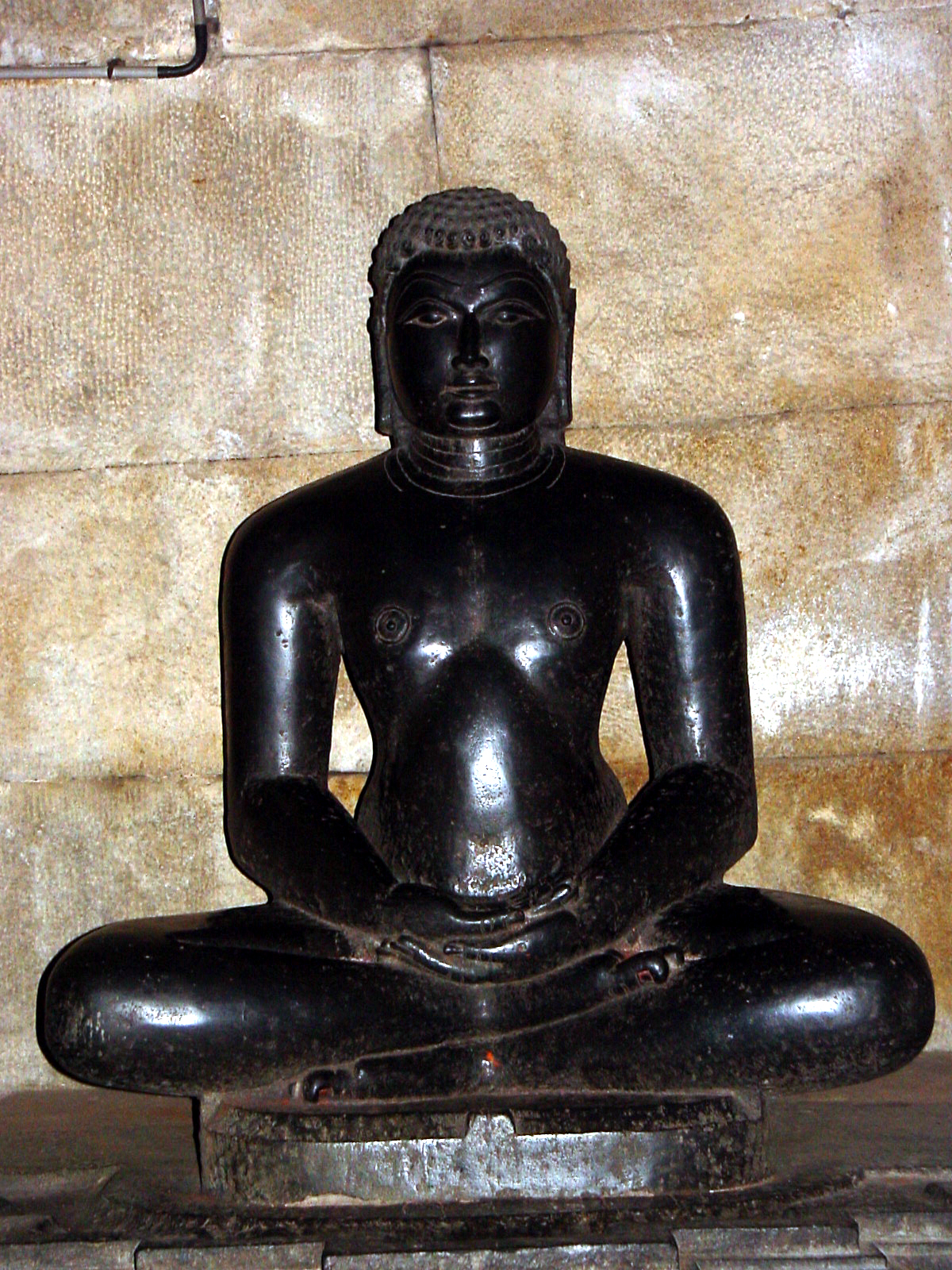
Shantinatha statue

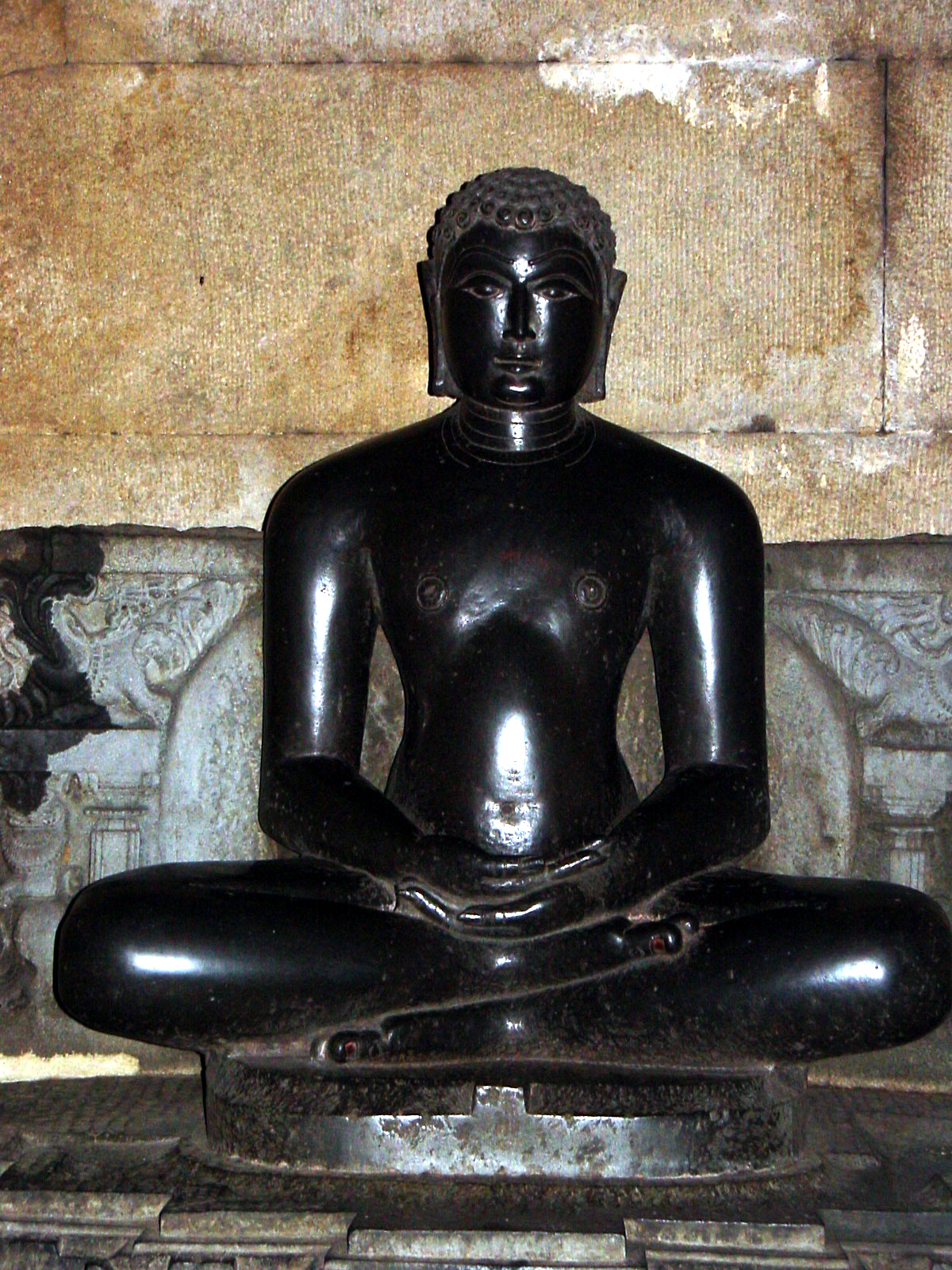
Neminatha statue

== See also ==
- Bhandara Basadi
- Chandragiri hill
- Chandragupta Basadi
- Chavundaraya Basadi
