= Amdavad Ma Famous =

- Official poster
- Directed by: Hardik Mehta
- Produced by: Akanksha Tewari, Arya A. Menon
- Starring: Zaid
- Cinematography: Piyush Puty and Harshbir Singh
- Music by: Alokananda Dasgupta
- Release date: 24 September 2015 (Budapest International Documentary Festival)
- Country: India
- Language: Gujarati

Amdavad Ma Famous (Gujarati: અમદાવાદમાં ફેમસ, English: Famous in Ahmedabad) is a documentary film about kite flying festival in Ahmedabad, India. The film is directed by Hardik Mehta and produced by Akanksha Tewari and Arya A. Menon. It was filmed with help of cinematographer Piyush Puty and Harshbir Singh. The film received the National Film Award for Best Non-Feature Film at 63rd National Film Awards for 2015.

== Plot ==
Set during the kaleidoscopic backdrop of Uttarayana, the kite-flying festival in Ahmedabad city of India, 'Amdavad Ma Famous', witnesses the transformation of an 11-year-old Zaid from a boy next door to an aggressive and a passionate kite-runner, till he comes across a challenge that threatens to keep him away from the one thing he loves.

== Release ==
Amdavad Ma Famous is released on Netflix.

== Awards ==
The film received the National Film Award for Best Non-Feature Film at 63rd National Film Awards for 2015. The film has also won the best short documentary award at the 2015 Budapest International Documentary Festival. It was nominated for the prestigious Golden Award and won the Jury Prize for Best Short Documentary at the Al Jazeera International Documentary Festival, Doha, Qatar in 2015.

The film also won the Golden Conch for Best Documentary (Up to 60 minutes) and Best Editor (Hardik Mehta) in the National competition at the 14th Mumbai International Film Festival in 2016. At 63rd Belgrade Film Festival, it won the Golden Plaque in International Competition for Best Documentary Short. The film was an official selection and in competition at 2016 Hot Docs Canadian International Documentary Festival, 2016 Palm Springs International Festival of Shorts, 2016 MAMI Mumbai International Film Festival, 2016 Indian Panorama at International Film Festival of India (IFFI) Goa. The film won Best Foreign Documentary at 2016 River Film Festival in Italy and 2016 All Sports Film Festival, LA, US. It also won Special Mention Jury award at 2016 International Documentary and Short Film Festival of Kerala (IDSFFK) and 2016 Smile International Film Festival for Children and Youth, New Delhi (SIFFCY).
