= Enemy (2015 film) =

2015 film by Dinesh P. Bhonsle

Enemy?
- Theatrical release poster
- Directed by: Dinesh P. Bhonsle
- Produced by: A.D. Prasad
- Starring: Meenacshi Martins; Salil Naik; Antonio Crasto; Samiksha Desai; Rajiv Hede; Shishir Krishna Sharma; Vishwajit Phadte; Nitin Kolvekar; Anuj Prabhu
- Cinematography: Vikram Amladi
- Edited by: Virendra Gharse
- Music by: Schubert Cotta
- Production company: Prasad creations
- Release date: 2015
- Country: India
- Language: Konkani

Enemy? is a 2015 Indian mystery film produced by A. Durga Prasad and directed by Dinesh P. Bhonsle who has previously directed Hindi-movie Calapor. The music was composed by Schubert Cotta. The film won the Best Konkani film Award in 63rd National Film Awards, Vigyan Bhawan New Delhi. It was officially selected to be screen at the 21st Kolkata International Film Festival 2015, Goa Marathi Film Festival 2016 and London Indian Film Festival 2016. Enemy was selected for the Indiwood Panorama Competition section at the 2nd edition of Indiwood Carnival 2016 in Hyderabad.

== Plot ==
In the midst of the festive season, a Goan Catholic family discovers that they have lost their property to the Government and their family honour is at stake. Sanjit, the soldier son has to fight a different battle. As the tension and drama builds up, Sanjit finds himself pushed to the edge.

== Cast ==
- Meenacshi Martins
- Salil Naik
- Antonio Crasto
- Samiksha Desai
- Rajiv Hede
- Shishir Krishna Sharma
- Vishwajit Phadte
- Nitin Kolvekar
- Rupa Chari
- Arvind Singh
- Ramakant Anvekar
- Gauri Kamat
- Mithun Mahambrey
- Tanvi Bambolkar
- Anuj Prabhu
- Libereta Fernandes

== Music ==
Music director Schubert Cotta has composed the tracks for the film, sung by Myron Mascarenhas with Mecxy Cotta and Jesus Gomes. The lyrics are by Ubald Fernandes, Vasco Rego SJ, Schubert Cotta and Roque Lazarus. The album was officially released on 7 September 2015. Five tracks were released by Prasad Creations.

- Theme song: Sung by Mecxy Cotta
- Sopnachea Molbar: Sung by Myron Mascarenhas, Jesus Gomes and Mecxy Cotta
- Hason Nachon: sung by Mecxy Cotta
- Devan Monxak: Sung by Mecxy Cotta
- Boddvo Sorghincho: Sung by Mecxy Cotta
