= D. K. Ravi =

Indian civil servant (1979–2015)

D. K. Ravi IAS

Additional Commissioner of Commercial Taxes, Government of Karnataka

Member of the U.S. House of Representatives from 's Kolar district
- In office 29 October 2014 – 16 March 2015

Deputy commissioner of Kolar
- In office 10 August 2013 – 29 October 2014
- Succeeded by: Dr. K. V. Trilok Chandra

Personal details
- Born: Doddakoppalu Kariyappa Ravi; 10 June 1979 Doddakoppalu, (Kunigal taluk, Karnataka, India)
- Died: 16 March 2015 (aged 35) Bangalore, India
- Cause of death: Suicide
- Spouse: Kusuma Hanumantharayappa
- Education: IARI, New Delhi; University of Agricultural Sciences, Bangalore
- Occupation: Indian Civil servant (Indian administrative service officer)

Doddakoppalu Kariyappa Ravi (10 June 1979 – 16 March 2015) was an Indian Administrative Service officer of Karnataka cadre, from the 2008 batch. He first came into limelight as a deputy commissioner of the Kolar district, after launching an official crackdown against the encroachment of government lands and rampant illegal sand mining in the district. Following fourteen months of service, he was transferred to Bangalore by the government of Karnataka as Additional Commissioner of Commercial Taxes (Enforcement) in October 2014. After his five months' tenure as additional commissioner which involved tax raids on major tax-evading real estate firms, he was found dead at his residence in Bangalore on 16 March 2015, under suspicious circumstances.

== Early life and education ==
Ravi was born on 10 June 1979 in the Kunigal taluk, Tumkur district of the Indian state of Karnataka, into an agricultural family of Kariyappa and Gowramma. He had two siblings: brother Ramesh and sister Bharathi. He graduated from University of Agricultural Sciences, Bangalore with an undergraduate degree in agriculture and went to pursue his post-graduation course in nematology from Indian Agricultural Research Institute, New Delhi. Prior to his entry into civil service, he worked as Sub Inspector of Excise with the Karnataka state Excise Department for over a year and a half. He cleared the 2008 UPSC Civil Services Examination with an all-India rank of 34. Opting for Indian Administrative Service, he was trained at Lal Bahadur Shastri National Academy of Administration, Mussoorie, for a probation period of two years between August 2009 to August 2011 and was allotted his home state cadre of Karnataka.

== Career ==
=== As assistant commissioner in Gulbarga ===
Ravi's first posting as a civil servant was as the assistant commissioner in Gulbarga from August 2011 to December 2012, following which he served as the deputy commissioner of Kolar district, Karnataka from August 2013 to October 2014. During this tenure, he was known for his work in ridding encroachments and exposing sand mafia in the district.

=== As deputy commissioner of Kolar district ===
During his stint as a Deputy commissioner of the Kolar district from August, 2013 to October, 2014, Ravi became almost a public figure due to his functioning as a pro people administrator, and launching of innovative reforms like conducting of Revenue and Podi adalat s, which went on to being getting recognised and implemented in other districts by the state government. He also had taken many bold steps to protect encroachment on government lands, including tanks, the main water source in the region and had ensured the checks on quality of building materials of public property like roads, during his tenure at Kolar. Subsequently, he was transferred out of this position in October, 2014, allegedly due to pressure from vested interests involved in land grabbing and illegal sand mining. His popularity among people of Kolar was evidenced when large number of people staged protests, following his transfer orders as deputy commissioner.

=== As Additional Commissioner of Commercial Taxes (Enforcement) ===
Ravi was posted as the Additional Commissioner of Commercial Taxes (Enforcement) by the government on 29 October 2014 in Bangalore. Following this, he prepared a list of top-50 tax defaulters and set a target of ₹1,000 crore (US$100 million) tax collection from the tax evading defaulters. He began raids in Bangalore and expanded to places across Karnataka raiding well-known business groups such as Embassy which include shares of state home minister, Rajesh Exports, Shubh Jewellers, RMZ Institution, Nitesh Builders, Prestige Group, Raheja Developers and Mantri Developers, and had reportedly collected over ₹138 crore (US$14 million) in the first two weeks. Following this, he allegedly received threat calls from the defaulters.

== Death ==
On 16 March 2015, Ravi was found hanging at his residence in Koramangala, Bangalore. He had gone to office from Nagarbhavi, Bangalore (the house of his in-laws), on Monday morning. He returned to his apartment at St John's Woods near Koramangala by 11.30 a.m. (IST). His family found him hanging by the ceiling fan in his bedroom of their apartment at 6:30 p.m. (IST), when they rushed home after he didn't answer the phone calls and no return phone calls made during the day. Following the news reaching the Bangalore police, police commissioner M. N. Reddi said that forensic and medical evidence hinted the death was prima facie a case of suicide. An autopsy on his body was conducted on the morning of 17 March at Victoria Hospital in Bangalore, following which it was shifted to his in-laws' house in Nagarbhavi. His last rites were performed on 18 March in Bangalore. The eleventh-day ritual, in accordance to customs of Hinduism, was held in his hometown Doddakoppalu, with his nephew performing the rituals.

=== Aftermath ===
Ravi's death infuriated people and the civil society alike who took to the streets on March 17 across parts of Karnataka such as Kolar and Gulbarga, where he served as an Assistant Commissioner. Towns in Kolar district observed total bandh with shops, commercial establishments, schools and colleges staying closed during the day, with state-run and private buses, auto rickshaws and other vehicles not operating. The protest was joined by lawyers, students and workers of various political parties and organizations. Crowds in Bangalore gathered in protest demanding an independent probe into the case and outside his residence to pay tributes to him. This was also followed by outpouring of anger and grief by people in various social media platforms like Facebook, Quora and Twitter.

On March 17, opposition parties in Karnataka Legislative Assembly demanded from the government an investigation by the Central Bureau of Investigation (CBI), but were refused. They went on to protest the government by launching in assembly, the overnight sit in. The government, however, announced a Crime Investigation Department (CID) investigation the same day. But some critics and members of the public opposed to the investigation by the CID, a police agency under the control of state government, which might risk the investigation's impartiality, efficiency and thoroughness. During initial investigations, the police made references to 44 phone calls made by Ravi to a female Indian Administrative Services batchmate, within an hour, on 16 March, the day he died. However, subsequent CBI Investigation denied this, while revealing that he had called her only once, not 44 times. The Karnataka High Court restrained the government from publishing any interim report of the CID. Yielding to pressure from protests carried out by people across Karnataka and parts of India, and by the opposition parties in the assembly, the state government agreed to hand over the case to the CBI on 23 March 2015.

In April 2015, the union government ordered a CBI probe after the Karnataka government sent a fresh notification without any time limit for the probe. In its report submitted to the Assistant Commissioner, Bengaluru South Sub-Division and Sub-Divisional Magistrate in November 2016, the CBI concluded that Ravi committed "suicide due to personal reasons". On 26 November, it was communicated to the government by the Magistrate to close the case under section 176 of Code of Criminal Procedure, 1973.

== In popular culture ==
The 2019 film Chambal was Closely based on the life of D. K. Ravi. 2021 Telugu movie Republic was inspired by him.

== See also ==
- Land grabbing
- Sand mining in India
