= Savaari 2 =

2014 Kannada-language romantic drama film

- Poster
- Directed by: Jacob Verghese
- Written by: Jacob Verghese
- Produced by: Jacob Verghese
- Starring: Srinagar Kitty; Abbas; Shruti Hariharan; Karan Rao; Madhurima
- Cinematography: D. Shashikumar
- Edited by: Bhavan Sreekumar
- Music by: Manikanth Kadri
- Production company: Jacob Films
- Distributed by: Jayanna Films
- Release date: 30 May 2014
- Running time: 135 minutes
- Country: India
- Language: Kannada

Savaari 2 is a 2014 Indian Kannada language romantic drama film written, produced, and directed by Jacob Verghese. It is a sequel to 2009 film Savari.

== Plot ==
Savaari 2 follows the journey of Srinivas, affectionately known as Seenu, a small-time thief with big aspirations. Seenu is engaged to Shruthi, the daughter of the state's home minister. Despite his connections, Seenu's life revolves around petty thefts and schemes to make quick money.

The story takes a turn when Seenu learns about a hidden treasure in the forest, allegedly concealed by the notorious forest brigand Veerappan. Determined to claim the fortune, Seenu teams up with Vishwanath, a seasoned journalist, and Arjun, a taxi driver with a mysterious past. The trio embarks on a road trip into the forest, facing various challenges and uncovering secrets along the way.

Their journey is further complicated when Seenu is kidnapped by a forest brigand named Channappa, leading to a series of unexpected events that test their resolve and friendship. As the adventure unfolds, the characters confront moral dilemmas, personal ambitions, and the true meaning of wealth and success.

== Cast ==
- Srinagar Kitty as Srinivas "Seenu"
- Sruthi Hariharan
- Karan Rao
- Abbas
- Girish Karnad
- Chikkanna
- Sadhu Kokila
- Nyra Banerjee
- Vaijanath Biradar
- Chikkanna
- Sihi Kahi Chandru
- Neenasam Ashwath
- Doddanna
- B. Jayamma
- Michael Madhu
- Om Prakash Rao
- Kaddipudi Chandru
- Avinash
- K. S. Ravindranath
- Sathish Kumar
- Jeeva
- H. G. Dattatreya
- Sharath Lohitashwa
- Mukhyamantri Chandru

== Soundtrack ==
No.	Title	Lyrics	Singer(s)	Length
1.	"Ninna Danigaagi (I)"	Jayanth Kaikini	Karthik, Yazin Nizar, Hamsika Iyer
2.	"Ninna Danigaagi (II)"		Santhosh Venky, Supriya Lohith
3.	"Simple Aagidde"		Raman Mahadevan, Shalmali Kholgade
4.	"Yaava Mohana Murali"		Ravi Muroor
5.	"Ello Mareyaagi"	Jayanth Kaikini	Ash King
6.	"Pipi Song"		Puneeth Rajkumar	3:04
7.	"Savari Theme Song"		Manikanth Kadri

== Reception ==
A critic from Bangalore Mirror wrote that "Savaari 2 tries to pay homage to Savaari, the 2009 film, and in the bargain warps whatever originality it had managed to come up with".
