= Savari (2009 film) =

- Directed by: Jacob Verghese
- Screenplay by: Jacob Verghese
- Story by: Radhakrishna Jagarlamudi
- Based on: Gamyam (2008)
- Produced by: Ramoji Rao
- Starring: Srinagar Kitty; Raghu Mukherjee; Kamalini Mukherjee; Suman Ranganathan
- Cinematography: R. Velraj
- Edited by: A. Sreekar Prasad
- Music by: Manikanth Kadri; E. S. Murthy
- Production companies: Ushakiran Movies; Arka Media Works
- Release date: 10 April 2009
- Running time: 140 minutes
- Country: India
- Language: Kannada

Savari (transl. The Ride) is a 2009 Indian Kannada language romantic drama film directed by Jacob Verghese and produced by Ramoji Rao of Ushakiran Movies in association with Arka Media Works. The film stars Raghu Mukherjee, Kamalini Mukherjee and Srinagar Kitty in main roles. It is a remake of Telugu film Gamyam (2008) directed by Radhakrishna Jagarlamudi.

The film released on 10 April 2009 across Karnataka and upon release, the film generally met with positive reviews from the critics and audience. It was one of the hit films of the year 2009 completing a successful 50 days run in many cinema halls. The film earned 5 Filmfare awards nominations at the 57th Filmfare Awards South in various categories including the Best Film. Kitty was selected for the Filmfare Special Jury Award for his performance in the film.

In 2014, a sequel to this film titled Savaari 2 was released which retained the actor Srinagar Kitty while replacing the other two main roles.

== Plot ==
Abhiram (Raghu) is a rich spoilt brat who believes only in class and hates the company of poor people with low profiles. He is in deep love with Dr. Janaki, an orphan who aims to serve poor people as a doctor and give them proper medication. Though he is in love with her, Abhiram does not like the path traversed by Janaki in helping poor and needy. This breaks their relationship apart and Janaki walks away to remote place on her job. Not able to withstand the agony of separation, Abhiram sets on a journey in finding Janaki again to carry on the relationship. Meanwhile, he meets Gaali Seenu (Kitty), a petty thief who is an expert in robbing the two wheeler vehicles. He strikes a deal with Seenu and further embarks his journey in search of Janaki. En route his search, Abhiram begins to slowly realize the real world and the noble intentions Janaki had in her service. Finally, the lovers meet up and what happens next forms the rest of the story.

== Cast ==
- Srinagar Kitty as Gaali Seena
- Raghu Mukherjee as Abhiram
- Kamalini Mukherjee as Dr. Janaki
- Milind Gunaji
- Suman Ranganathan
- C. R. Simha
- H. G. Dattatreya
- Pavitra Lokesh
- Lokanath
- M. N. Lakshmi Devi
- Dinesh Mangalore
- Saurav Lokesh as Salman
- Prakash Urs as 'Gun Master', the reformed Naxal.

== Production ==
Jacob Verghese announced his desire to remake the successful Telugu film Gamyam as his maiden Kannada venture. He teamed up with Ramoji Rao from the famous Ushakiran Movies production and first signed in actress Kamalini Mukherjee to reprise her original role in this remake version too. He told the reporters that he has only retained the original concept while the narrative pattern is dealt with freshly. He later roped in Mr. India contest winner Raghu Mukherjee and Srinagar Kitty to play the roles of Sharwanand and Allari Naresh respectively. The film was shot at the temple town of Kukke Subramanya, Sakleshpur, Kuduremukha and Yadiyur, all in Karnataka state.

== Soundtrack ==
Savaari

Soundtrack album by Manikanth Kadri E S Murthy
- Released: 14 March 2009
- Genre: Film soundtrack
- Label: Anand Audio
- Producer: Mano Murthy

The soundtrack totally consists of 6 songs out of which 4 are composed by Manikanth Kadri and remaining two are by E. S. Murthy. The audio launch was held on 14 March 2009 at a hotel in Bangalore.

Upon release, the soundtrack was popular and was on top of the charts for many weeks. "Marali Mareyagi" and "Ale Aleyo" songs were very well received.

Track listing
No.	Title	Lyrics	Music	Singer(s)	Length
1.	"Ale Ale"	Kaviraj	Manikanth Kadri	Karthik, Reeta	04:49
2.	"Marali Mareyagi"	Sudheer Attavar	Manikanth Kadri	Sadhana Sargam	04:48
3.	"Poli Putta"	V. Nagendra Prasad	Manikanth Kadri	Anuradha Bhat, Manikanth Kadri	04:24
4.	"Marali Mareyagi"	Sudheer Attavar	Manikanth Kadri	Anuradha Bhat	04:46
5.	"Bisilu Thaagi"	Sudheer Attavar	E S Murthy	Rahul Nambiar	04:31
6.	"Rhythm Ide"	Sudheer Attavar	E S Murthy	Ranjith	04:16

== Reception ==
R. G. Vijayasarathy of Rediff.com scored the film at 3 out of 5 stars and says "The musical work in the film has just complemented the narration, but certainly not top class. Compared to the level of technical supremacy seen in Kannada films recently, neither Welraj's photography nor Srikar's editing can be called exceptional. Savaari could have been a better film yet it is a good entertainer for those who have not seen the original". A critic from The New Indian Express wrote "Meanwhile, Abhi goes in search of Janaki. He happens to meet Seena alias Gaali Seenu (Kitty) on the way, a habitual thief. Seenu becomes friendly with Abhi with an intention to steal his motorcycle, but circumstances make Seenu help Abhi. But unfortunately, Seenu falls to Naxalites’ bullets and Abhi reunites with his sweetheart. A well made film, it is sure to appeal to the classes as well as the masses". A critic from Bangalore Mirror wrote "However, the story mostly revolves around the three characters (with Janaki's character for the most part appearing in flashes of recall) who have put up good performances. An interesting film that you would not like to miss". Deccan Herald wrote, "Savari is a man’s journey of self discovery. Described delightfully in Gamyam, the same tale pales somewhat in comparison. Yet, Savari is not without its attractions, [beginning] with Raghu Mukherjee". A critic from IANS wrote that "Savaari succeeds because of the twists and turns in the second half and refined performances from the major and minor artists".
