= G. P. Rajarathnam =

Indian writer (1909–1979)

- Born: 5 December 1909; Gundlupet, Chamrajnagar, Karnataka, India
- Died: 1979 (aged 70)
- Education: Master of Arts
- Occupations: Story writer, lyricist, author, poet, translator, editor
- Spouse(s): Lalithamma, Seethamma
- Relatives: Sridhar (son), Shaila Sridhar Rajarathnam (daughter-in-law), Srimathi Sampathkumar (daughter) and Srilata Vijayakumar (daughter)
- Writing career
- Pen name: Bhramara
- Language: Kannada, Pali, Prakrit, English
- Genres: Children's literature, biography, criticism, interpretation, fiction, prayers and devotions, poetry
- Notable works: Rathnana Padagalu, Nagana Padagalu

G. P. Rajarathnam (1909–1979), known by his pen name as Bhramara (Bee), was a Kannada author, lyricist and poet in Karnataka, India. Rajarathnam was well known for composing poems for children. Nissar Ahmed once said "he understood the minds of children, and their need. Some of his works have remained a challenge for translators even today".

Rajarathnam wrote on Buddhism, Jainism and Islam. A road has been named after him in Bengaluru, of the state.

== Personal life ==
Rajarathnam was born in 1909, in Gundlupet, Chamrajnagar, Karnataka. His ancestors belonged to Tirukkanapur agrahara of Tamil Nadu's Naga city. They migrated to Mysore, Karnataka in 1906. Rajarathnam's wives were Lalithamma and Seethamma.

== Career ==
Rajarathnam wrote 230 works in 338 publications including books such as Rathnana Padagalu (Ratna's songs) and Nagana Padagalu (Naga's songs), and children's poems such as Nayi Mari Nayi Mari (Puppy dog, puppy dog), Bannadha Thagadina Thuthoori (Colorful metalfoil trumpet) and Ondhu-Yeardu (One-Two). His works were known to be a confluence of all religions.

He was the teacher of Kannada poet G. S. Shivarudrappa.

== Bibliography ==
"Put me in hell, slit my tongue, stitch up my mouth, I’ll still sing kannada songs through my nose,"

— G.P. Rajaratnam, on his love of singing in mother tongue, as quoted in The Hindu

Book	Year	Publisher	Ref
Sūryamitra modalāda Jainara kategaḷu (Suryamitra and other jainites' tales)	1975	Sapna book house, Bengaluru	
Hattu varuṣa (Ten years)	1939	Manōhara Grantha Prakāśana Samiti; Dhāravāḍa	
Namma Oḍeyara kathegaḷu (Our kings' stories)	1974	Sṭyāṇḍarḍ Book Ḍipō; Bengaluru	
Cakravarti vajra (Cakravarthi's Vajra)	1974	Śrī Rājaratnaṃ Baḷaga, Bengaluru	
Nāgana padagaḷu	1952	Karnāṭaka Saṅgha, Bengaluru	
Ratnana padagaḷu	1945	Satyaśōdhana Prakāṭana Mandira, Bengaluru	
Śānti (Female saint)	1934	Rāma Mōhana Kampeni, Bengaluru	
Śrīmān Ḍi. Vi. Ji. avaru citrisiruva Śrī Rāmacandra Prabhu (Sri Ramachandra Prabhu as pictured by D. V. Gundappa (DVG))	1977	Videha, Bengaluru	
Hanigaḷu (Drops)	1933	Karṇāṭaka Saṅgha, Śivamogga	
Kailāsaṃ nenapu mattu Kailāsa kathana (Kailasam memories and kailasa stories)	1948	Ji. Pi. Rājaratnaṃ, Bengaluru	
Mahākavi puruṣa Sarasvati (Great poet Sarasvathi)	1940	Satyaśōdhana Prakaṭaṇa Mandira ivaru idannu māruvaru, Bengaluru	
Svatantrabhāratada Aśōkacakra dhvaja (Independent India's Ashoka Chakra flag)	1948	Hind Kitābs, Bombāyi	
Śrī Harṣa	1936	Satyaśōdhana Prakaṭana Mandira, Bengaluru	
Nanna Jainamatadharmasāhityasēve (My literature work on Jain religion)	1994	Śākya Sāhitya Maṇṭapa, Bengaluru	
Gautama Buddha	1936	Satyaśōdhana Prakaṭana Mandira, Bengaluru	
Yēsu Krista (Jesus Christ)	1941	Bi. Bi. Ḍi. Pavar Pres, Bengaluru	
Gaṇḍugoḍali mattu Sambhavāmi yugē yugē	1968	-NA-	
Narakada nyāya modalāda nālku nāṭakagaḷu (Justice of hell and four other dramas)	2008	Sapna book house, Bengaluru	
Vīramārtaṇḍa Cāvuṇḍarāya	1974	Śākya Sāhitya Maṇṭapa, Bengaluru	
Pampabhārata sāra emba Pampana Vikramārjuna vijaya saṅgrahada Hosagannaḍa gadyānuvāda (Pampa's Vikramarjuna vijaya collection's prose translation called Pampabharatha's essence)	1948	Hind Kitābs, Bombāyi	
Ratnana dōsti ratna, atava, Bēvārsiya barāvu (Ratna's friend ratna (gem) or orphan's sweat)	1934	Rāma Mōhana Kampeni, Bengaluru	
Dharma, sāhitya, dr̥ṣṭi (Religion, literature, view)	1937	Śākya Sāhitya Maṇṭapa, Bengaluru	
Sarvadēvanamaskāra (Salutations to all gods)	1970	-NA-	
Saṃsa kaviya Vigaḍa Vikrama carita (Samsa's sarcastic courage epic)	1948	Mārāṭagāraru Satyaśōdhana; Pustaka Bhaṇḍāra in Beṇgaḷūru	
Vicārataraṅga (Creepy shape wave)	1967	-NA-	
Rannana rasaghaṭṭa emba Rannana Gadāyuddha kāvya saṅgrahada hosagannada gadyānuvāda (Ranna’s Gadhayuddha poetry collection (in new-kannada) prose translation called, Ranna's juicy time)	1948	Hind Kitābs, Bombāyi	
Dharmadāni Buddha (Religion donator Buddha)	1933	Rāma Mōhana Kampeni, Beṇgaḷūru	
Cuṭaka	1940	Prōgres Buk Sṭāl, Maisūru	.
Vicāra raśmi (Creepy shaped rays)	1985	Śākya Sāhitya Maṇṭapa, Beṅgaḷūru	
Śrī Sāyicintana (Sathya Sai Baba thoughts)	1969	Vidēha, Beṅgaḷūru	
Svārasya (Interesting)	1993	Śākya Sāhitya Maṇṭapa, Beṅgaḷūru	
Kailāsa kathana, athavā, Guṇḍū bhaṇḍāra mathana (Kailasa story or Gundu repository thinking)	1945	Bi. Bi. Ḍi. Pavar Pres, Beṅgaḷūru	
Śr̥ṅgāravallari (Decorated Vallari)	1973	-NA-	
Namma nagegāraru (Our comedians)	-NA-	Satyaśōdhana Prakaṭana Mandira, Bengaluru	
Mātina malli (Lady speech expert)	1951	Ānand Bradars, Bengaluru	
Śri Kailāsam avara Ēkalavya (Kailasam's novel Ekalavya)	1969	-NA-	
Kariya kambaḷi mattu itara kategaḷu (Black blanket and other stories)	1951	Ānand Bradars, Bengaluru	
Apakathā vallari	1939	Satyaśōdhana Prakaṭana Mandira, Bengaluru	
Kavi Gōvinda Pai (Poet Govinda Pai)	1949	Jīvana Kāryālaya, Bengaluru	
Boppaṇa Paṇḍita racisiruva Gommaṭajinastuti (Boppaṇa Paṇḍita structured Gommaṭa Jain praise)	1974	s.n., Bengaluru	
Tuttūri (Trumpet)	1940	Prōgres Buk Sṭāl; Maisūru	
Nanna Śrīvaiṣṇava kaiṅkarya (My Vaishnava infrastructure)	1971	-NA-	
Kandana kāvyamāle (Baby's poem garland)	2008	Sapna book house, Bengaluru	
Kannaḍada sētuve (Kannada's bridge)	1971	Videha, Bengaluru	
Nanna nenapina bīru (My memories cupboard)	1998	Kannaḍa Saṅgha, Bengaluru	
Cīnādēśada Bauddha yātrikaru (China country's Buddhist travellers)	1932	Kannaḍa Saṅgha, Bengaluru	
Nītiratnakaraṇḍa	1971	-NA-	
Nūru puṭāṇi (100 child)	1940	Bi. Bi. Ḍi. Pavar Pres, Bengaluru	
Snēhada dīpa (Friendship's lamp)	1972	-NA-	
Śrī Bāhubali vijayaṃ (Baahubali's triumph)	1953	Gōkhale Sārvajanika; Vicārasaṃstheya Vyāsaṅga; Gōnsṭhi, Beṅgaḷūru	
Citrāṅgadā citrakūṭa	1949	-NA-	
Kallina kāmaṇṇa (Stone's kamanna )	1952	Ānand Bradars, Bengaluru	
Kallusakkare (Sugarstones)	1935	Satyaśōdhana Prakaṭana Mandira, Bengaluru	
Buddhana kālada tīrthakarū tīrthakararū (Buddha era's monks)	1937	Śākya Sāhitya Maṇṭapa, Bengaluru	
Nūru varṣaṣagaḷa accumeccu (100 years’ favourite)	1971	-NA-	
Śrī Gōmaṭēśvara (Gommateshwara)	1938	Śākya Sāhitya Maṇṭapa, Bengaluru	
Nakkaḷā tāyi (Smiled that mother)	1944	Manōhara Grantha Prakāśana Samiti; Dhāravāḍa	
Śakārana śārōṭu mattu itara dr̥śyagaḷu (Sankara's carriage and other views)	1943	Kannaḍa Saṅgha, Bengaluru	
Japānina Himagiri mattu itara kavanagaḷu (Japan’s mist mountains and other poems)	1971	-NA-	

== Filmography ==
- Olave Mandara (lyricist) (2011)
- Kallara Santhe (lyricist) (2009)
- Suntaragaali (lyricist) (2006)
- Gokarna (lyricist) (2003)
- A (lyricist) (1998)
- Chitrakoota (lyricist) (1980)
- Mother (lyricist) (1980)
- Havina Hede (lyricist) (1981)
- Devadasi (lyricist) (1978)
- Anireekshitha (lyricist) (1970)

=== Popular songs ===
- "Helkolokondoru"
