= Jacob Verghese =

Indian film director

- Other name: Jacob Varghese
- Occupations: Director, producer, cinematographer
- Years active: 2009–present
- Notable work: Savari (2009); Prithvi (2010)

Jacob Verghese is an Indian film director, producer, and cinematogapher, who works in Kannada and Malayalam films.

== Personal life ==
His native is Puthuppally, Kottayam and he settled in Bengaluru. His brother Mathew Verghese co-produced Dribbling with their Future (2016) and Ayushman (2021) alongside journalist Dinesh Rajkumar N, who produced Andhyam..

== Career ==
After making his debut through Andhiyum, he directed the Savari film series (2009-2014) and Prithvi (2010). He directed the sports documentaries Dribbling with their Future (2016; based on football) and Ayushman (Running Positive) (2019; based on running). Chambal (2019) was based on the life D. K. Ravi.

== Filmography ==
Year	Title	Language	Notes	Ref.
2006	Andhyam	Malayalam	Short film; National Film Award for Best Debut Film of a Director (non-feature film)	
	Putti	Kannada	Short film	
2009	Savari	Kannada		
2010	Prithvi	Kannada		
2014	Savaari 2	Kannada	Also producer	
2016	Dribbling with their Future	Kannada	National Film Award for Best Exploration/Adventure Film	
2019	Chambal	Kannada		
2021	Ayushman (Running Positive)	Kannada	Also cinematographer National Film Award for Best Exploration/Adventure Film	
