= Ayushman =

Indian Kannada-language documentary film

- Poster
- Directed by: Jacob Verghese
- Produced by: Mathew Verghese; Dinesh Rajkumar N Naveen Francis
- Starring: Babu; Manik
- Cinematography: Jacob Verghese; N Dinesh Raj Kumar
- Edited by: Kalveer Biradar; Ashwin Prakash R
- Music by: Ricky Kej
- Production company: Jacob Films
- Release date: 2021
- Country: India
- Languages: Kannada; English

Ayushman, also titled Running Positive internationally, is a 2021 Indian Kannada-language documentary film directed by Jacob Verghese. The film won the National Film Award for Best Exploration/Adventure Film.

== Plot ==
The film follows two 14 year old boys, Babu and Manik, from Hoskote (near Bengaluru) and Bidar, respectively, who were both born HIV positive. They grew up at NAMS Snehasadan and Sarjapur after their parents passing. The film follows their journey as they run 10 km and half marathon races in 12 different countries across 5 continents, including the UN Headquarters in Geneva, Switzerland; the Children Olympics in Netherlands; and Rome.

== Cast ==
- Babu as himself
- Manik as himself

== Controversy ==
The Bengaluru School Sports Foundation alleged that Jacob Verghese failed to provide copyright rights for the film to the organisation although they were paid for it. Verghese falsely claimed ownership of the film while applying for the Sahitya Akademi Awards. The Bangalore School Sports Foundation reported losses due to this.
