= National Film Award for Best Exploration/Adventure Film =

Indian film award

- National award for contributions to short film
- Sponsored by: Directorate of Film Festivals
- Rewards: Rajat Kamal (Silver Lotus); ₹50,000
- First award: 1984
- Final award: 2021
- Most recent winner: Ayushman

Highlights
- Total awarded: 21
- First winner: Everest 84

The National Film Award for Best Exploration/Adventure Film (including sports) was one of the National Film Awards presented annually by the Directorate of Film Festivals, the organisation set up by Ministry of Information and Broadcasting, India. It was one of several awards presented for non-feature films and awarded with Rajat Kamal (Silver Lotus).

The award was instituted in 1984, at 32nd National Film Awards and awarded annually for films produced in the year across the country, in all Indian languages. At the 70th National Film Awards, the award is discontinued and clubbed with National Film Award for Best Promotional Film, National Film Award for Best Scientific Film, National Film Award for Best Educational/Motivational/Instructional Film, National Film Award for Best Investigative Film, National Film Award for Best Anthropological/Ethnographic Film, National Film Award for Best Agriculture Film, National Film Award for Best Film on Social Issues and National Film Award for Best Non-Feature Environment/Conservation/Preservation Film, and two new categories were created; Best Documentary and Best Non Feature Film Promoting Social and Environmental Values.

== Winners ==
Award includes 'Rajat Kamal' (Silver Lotus) and cash prize. Following are the award winners over the years:

List of films, showing the year, language(s), producer(s) and director(s)
Year	Film(s)	Language(s)	Producer(s)	Director(s)	Refs.
1984 (32nd)	Everest 84	English	Cinema Vision India	Siddharth Kak	
1985 (33rd)	High Adventure on White Waters	English	Yash Choudhary	C. L. Kaul	
1986 (34th)	No Award				
1987 (35th)	Antarctica: A Continuing Mystery (News Magazine No: 101)	English	Vijay B. Chandra for Films Division	Mahesh Kamble (Cameraman)	
1988 (36th)	No Award				
1989 (37th)	No Award				
1990 (38th)	The Indigenous of Manipur	English	Aribam Syam Sharma	Aribam Syam Sharma	
1991 (39th)	No Award				
1992 (40th)	Antarctica: A Scientists' Paradise	English	R. Krishna Mohan for Films Division	A. Udayashankar	
1993 (41st)	The Splendour of Garhwal and Roopkund	English	The Garhwal Mandal Vikas Nigam	Victor Banerjee	
1994 (42nd)	No Award				
1995 (43rd)	No Award				
1996 (44th)	No Award				
1997 (45th)	In Search of Excellence	Hindi	Kuldeep Sinha for Films Division	Raghu Krishna	
1998 (46th)	Malana: In Search Of	English	Neo Films	Vivek Mohan	
1999 (47th)	No Award				
2000 (48th)	No Award				
2001 (49th)	No Award				
2002 (50th)	No Award				
2003 (51st)	Madness in the Desert	English	Aamir Khan	Satyajit Bhatkal	
2004 (52nd)	Shores of Silence: Whale Sharks in India	English	Gautam Pandey	Ranjana Pandey	
2005 (53rd)	No Award				
2006 (54th)	No Award				
2007 (55th)	No Award				
2008 (56th)	Shingnaba	Manipuri	Bachaspa Timayum Sunzu	Bachaspa Timayum Sunzu	
2009 (57th)	No Award				
2010 (58th)	Boxing Ladies	Hindi	Satyajit Ray Film and Television Institute	Anusha Nandakumar	
2011 (59th)	The Finish Line	English	Syed Sultan Ahmed and Tabassum Modi	Akshay Roy	
2012 (60th)	Manipuri Pony	• English • Manipuri	Films Division of India	Aribam Syam Sharma	
2013 (61st)	No Award				
2014 (62nd)	Life Force – India's Western Ghats	English	Grey Films India Pvt. Ltd.	Nallamuthu Subbiah	
2015 (63rd)	Dribbling with their Future	Kannada	• N. Dinesh Raj Kumar • Mathew Verghese	Jacob Verghese	
2016 (64th)	Matitle Kusti	• English • Telugu	Madhavi Reddy	Prantik Vivek Deshmukh	
2017 (65th)	Ladakh Chale Richawala		Films Division of India	Indrani Chakrabarti	
2018 (66th)	No Award				
2019 (67th)	Wild Karnataka	English	Amoghavarsha JS	• Amoghavarsha J. S. • Kalyan Varma • Sarath Champati • Vijaya Mohan Raj	
2020 (68th)	Wheeling the Ball	• English • Hindi	Films Division of India	Mukesh Sharma	
2021 (69th)	Ayushman	• English • Kannada	• Mathew Varghese • Dinesh Rajkumar N. • Naveen Francis	Jacob Verghese	
