= Prithvi (2010 film) =

2010 Indian Kannada-language action thriller film

- Film Poster
- Directed by: Jacob Verghese
- Written by: Jacob Verghese
- Dialogues by: B A Madhu; Manju Mandavya
- Produced by: N. S. Rajkumar; Soorappa Babu
- Starring: Puneeth Rajkumar; Parvathy; Avinash
- Cinematography: Sathya. P
- Edited by: Kishore Te.
- Music by: Manikanth Kadri
- Release date: 23 April 2010
- Running time: 134 minutes
- Country: India
- Language: Kannada

Prithvi is a 2010 Indian Kannada-language action thriller film directed by Jacob Verghese and co-produced by N. S. Rajkumar. The film stars Puneeth Rajkumar and Parvathy Thiruvothu in lead roles. Manikanth Kadri composed the music of the film.

== Plot ==
Prithvi Kumar is an aspiring IAS trainee, who passes his CSE examination and receives posting as DC in Bellary district. He is married to his love interest Priya and leaves for Bellary and they receive a warm welcome there. Prithvi joins the office and learns about the illegal mining and water pollution arising in the district. At the office, Prithvi is visited by an old man named Shankarappa from Sandur-Taluk, who reveals that his son Kantharaju is missing for many days, Prithvi promises to look into the matter.

Meanwhile, Prithvi looks into the Eshwari mines files and is visited by the mining federation, who bribe him with an expensive watch in the form of a felicitation, Prithvi denies the offer. Later, Prithvi learns from Sandur-Taluk Inspector Suryaprakash that Kantharaju is actually a government surveyor and goes to the Sandur-Taluk hospital, only to find that the patients have diseases caused by the illegal mining. Naagendra Nayak, who is the main owner of the Eshwari Mines tells Prithvi to blindly sign the file with the support of his minister brother Narasimha Nayak and the Home Minister. Prithvi refuses and rejects the file and sends it to Central Government, which provokes Naagendra, who destroys Prithvi's bike with a bomb,

When Prithvi and Priya were at an NGO school function. Prithvi seizes the illegal mines owned by Naagendra, due to which Naagendra forms a strike with the help of people and a riot ensues where the media projects Prithvi as a leader. Narasimha forces the Home Minister to order Prithvi to reopen the factory, but to no avail. With the help of a reporter Basavaraj, He finds about the border dispute between Karnataka and Andhra Pradesh and the survey file is with Kantharaju. One night, Prithvi receives a call from Basavaraj, who reveals that he found Kantharaju in Ananth Nagar, Andhra Pradesh and is ready to meet him. Prithvi, along with Surya Prakash and Basavaraj meets Kantharaju, who gives the border-survey file to Prithvi and leaves. Naagendra's henchman finds out and informs it to Naagendra, who kidnaps Kantharaju.

Basavaraj leaves for Bangalore, but gets kidnapped by Naagendra, who kills him and throws his severed head at Prithvi's house. Naagendra provokes Prithvi and they engage in hand-to-hand combat at the office where the Home Minister grants a leave to Prithvi, based on trauma. Priya, who is horrified by the events ask Prithvi that they leave the district, but Prithvi objects and tells Priya that she can leave. A dejected Priya leaves to her parents' house. Prithvi confronts Naagendra's henchman, and a battle ensues where Prithvi is knocked in the process but survives. Prithvi calls Surya Prakash and formulates a plan to destroy Naagendra. Under Prithvi's orders, Surya Prakash tells Naagendra to arrive with Kantharaju alone and will hand over the survey file.

Naagendra arrives with Kantharaju and meets Prithvi where they engage in close-combat. Prithvi defeats Naagendra where he frees Kantharaju and buries Naagendra, along with his car in his own mining. Kantharaju, along with his wife and children reunite with Shankarappa. Priya reunites with Prithvi. Narasimha gets arrested due to the illegal mining and the mines are seized by the Government and Naagendra's name is added in the Bellary missing person case. The film ends with Prithvi continuing his duties as the DC in Bellary.

== Cast ==
- Puneeth Rajkumar as Prithvi Kumar
- Parvathy Thiruvothu as Priya
- Srinivasa Murthy as Prithvi's father
- Sathyapriya as Gowri, Prithvi's mother
- Ramesh Bhat as Priya's father
- Padmaja Rao as Priya's mother
- C. R. Simha as Home Minister of Karnataka
- Avinash Yelandur as Narasimha Nayak
- John Kokken as Nagendra Nayak
- Sadhu Kokila as Tirupathi
- John Vijay as Inspector Suryaprakash
- Achyuth Kumar as Sharanappa
- Shivaji Jadhav as Narayanappa
- Padma Vasanthi as Basavaraj's wife
- Spoorthi as Aarti, Prithvi's sister
- Mico Shivu
- Prakash Urs as the Journalist
- Anil

== Soundtrack ==
Prithvi

Soundtrack album by Manikanth Kadri
- Released: 11 April 2010
- Recorded: 2009–10
- Genre: Feature film soundtrack
- Length: 27:05
- Label: Anand Audio
External audio
- Official Audio Jukebox on YouTube

Manikanth Kadri scored the film's background music and composed its soundtrack, lyrics for which was penned by Jayant Kaikini, K. Kalyan and Kaviraj. The soundtrack album consists of six tracks. Actress and singer Shruti Haasan made her debut as a playback singer for a Kannada track with "Nenapidu Nenapidu". Saxophonist Kadri Gopalnath, also the father of the composer Manikanth Kadri, lent bits to the track "Kukkoo Kogileyinda". The album was released in Bangalore on 11 April 2010. Anand Audio distributed the album into the market.

Track listing
No.	Title	Lyrics	Singer(s)	Length
1.	"Hejjegondu Hejje"	Kaviraj	Clinton Cerejo, Benny Dayal, Shweta Mohan	4:39
2.	"Nenapidu Nenapidu"	K. Kalyan	Karthik, Shruti Haasan	4:26
3.	"Kukkoo Kogileyinda"	K. Kalyan	Rajesh Krishnan, Sunidhi Chauhan	4:46
4.	"Ninagende Visheshavaada"	Jayanth Kaikini	Kunal Ganjawala, Hamsika Iyer	4:26
5.	"Haagella Nee Nodabeda"	Jayanth Kaikini	Haricharan, Anitha Karthikeyan	4:42
6.	"Jagave Ninadu"	K. Kalyan	Manikanth Kadri, Benny Dayal	4:06
Total length:				27:05

== Release ==
Prithvi ran for 70 days in the Sagar and Menaka. The film became a commercial success in the A centers and multiplexes, but it flopped in B and C Centres. However, the film received cult status. The movie did a pre-release business of ₹8 crores.

The film was also dubbed in Malayalam and Telugu as Prithvi IAS.

== Reception ==
=== Critical response ===
The Times of India gave 3.5/5 stars and wrote "A good show by director Jacob Varghese, who has chosen the intriguing Bellary politics with `gani-dhanis' (mining lords) in focus". Shruti Indira Lakshminarayana of Rediff gave 3.5/5 stars and wrote "Jacob Verghese adds commercial touch to this serious subject by including some heavy duty action sequences. Prithvi is definitely a treat for Puneet fans". B S Srivani of Deccan Herald praised the script, cast performances, action scenes and technical aspects. Bangalore Mirror wrote "Prithvi is still worth a watch. Fans can look forward to multiple viewing". Renu Joseph of News18 termed the film as "A fast-paced action thriller" despite its predictability.
