= Vindhyagiri Hill =

Hill in Karnataka, India

Coordinates: 12°51′15″N 76°29′07″E

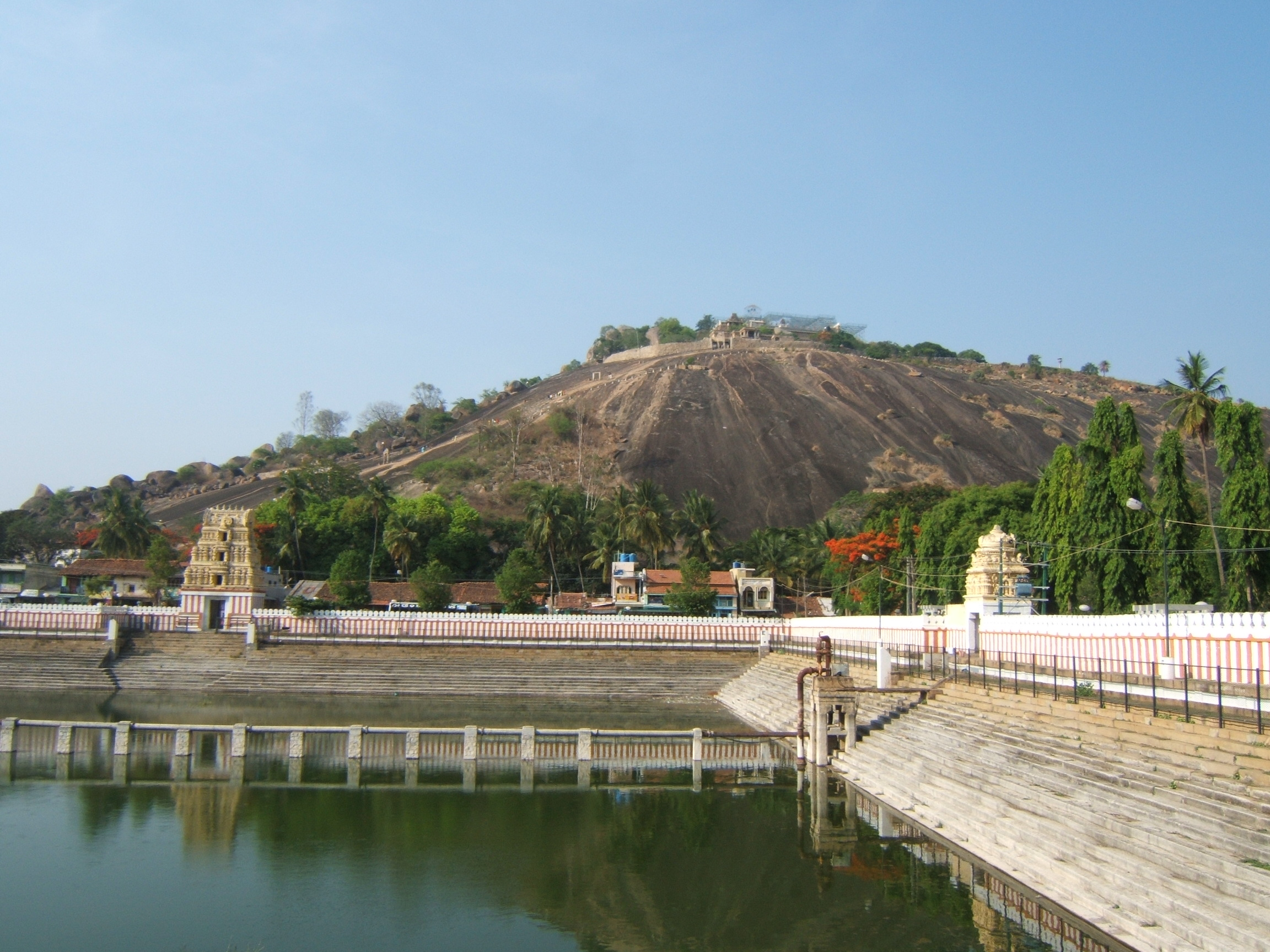
- Vindhyagiri hill from the ground

Geography

Vindhyagiri, also known as Indragiri, Dodda betta is one of the two hills in Shravanabelagola in the Indian state of Karnataka. The other one being Chandragiri.

== History ==
Vindhyagiri is first referred to as "Per kavappu" (Large - Kalbappu) in 8th Century, but its history begins with that of Gommateshwara in the Late 10th century. A century and half later the town is named Gommatapura, after the colossus, but the hill itself is not identified with a distinctive name. The present name "Vindhyagiri" is said to be derived from vim, 'spirit', and dhya, 'meditation', as being the spot consecrated by rishis observed in the meditation on the supreme spirit.

== Geography ==
The hill is located about 3,288 Feet from Mean sea Level and 438 Feet above the ground.

== Importance ==
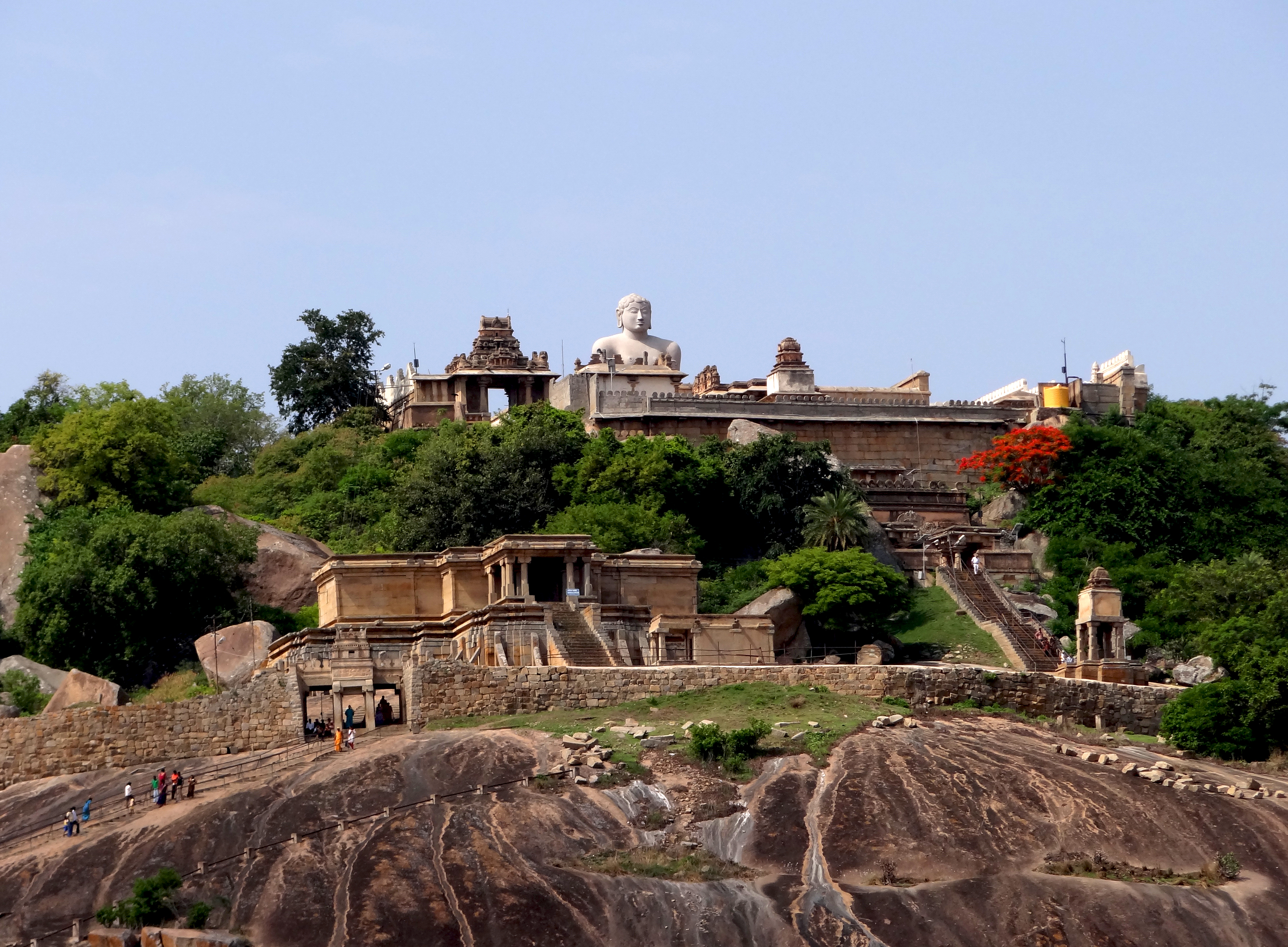
Vindyagiri summit area with Gommateshwara statue in the background, Odegal basadi in foreground.

The colossus of Bahubali at the summit dominates the valley. Jain mythology informs us that the first colossus of Bahubali was installed by Bharata at Paudanapura, it is described to be about 525 spans (Maru - about a meter) high. The 58' 8" high Bahubali image on the Large Hill with 438' high granite mass forming its pedestal.

In 981 A.D., Chavundaraya, a Ganga minister converted a tor standing at the summit into a colossus. Choosing a strategic opening between boulders, he also constructed a gateway (the present Akhanda Bagilu) with a large Gajalakshmi panel adorning its upper portion.

Odegal basadi is the largest basadi on Vindhyagiri hill. The temple derives the name from 'Odega', i.e., soapstone used for strengthening the walls of the temple. The temple houses image of Rishabhanatha, Neminatha and Shantinatha.

== See also ==
- Shravanbelgola
- Jainism in Karnataka
- Jainism in North Karnataka
- Jain Bunt
