= Hardik Mehta =

Indian writer and director

Hardik Mehta is a writer-director who works in both fiction as well as non fiction formats.

He won the National Award, in addition to several other awards and honors across international film festivals, for his documentary short Amdavad Ma Famous set against the backdrop of the kite-flying festival in Gujarat.

== Career ==
Mehta graduated from AJK Mass Communication Research Centre, Jamia Milia Islamia, with a degree of M.A in Mass Communication. He spent the next few years working with some of the most renowned figures from the Indian film industry such as Dev Benegal, Vikramaditya Motwane and Vikas Bahl – as an Assistant director and script-continuity supervisor.

In 2015, he went on to direct his own documentary, Amdavad Ma Famous (2015), set against the backdrop of the kite-flying festival in Gujarat that won him the Swarna Kamal, National Award for Best Non-Feature Film in 2016.

In 2017, Hardik wrote and directed a short film, The Affair which was presented by Drishyam Films. Prolonging his association with the Lootera director, Vikramaditya Motwane, Mehta also co-wrote the script for the 2017 survival-thriller, Trapped.

His debut feature film Kaamyaab premiered at the 2018 Busan International Film Festival and later it was picked by superstar Shah Rukh Khan, who co-produced the film under his production house Red Chillies Entertainment along with Drishyam Films. Kaamyaab released theatrically on March 6, 2020 to rave reviews and is now available on Netflix worldwide.

Mehta has also co-written the critically acclaimed Amazon Prime Video series, Paatal Lok.

His next directorial film Roohi, starring Rajkummar Rao, Varun Sharma and Janhvi Kapoor released in March 2021 and in the same year Hardik was the director and showrunner for Netflix series Decoupled starring R.Madhavan and Surveen Chawla.

In 2024, Hardik directed the first film 'An unSuitable Girl' for the anthology Love Storiyaan produced by Karan Johar's Dharmatic entertainment and Amazon Prime Video. The docu-drama series is inspired from the Instagram page India Love Project and was created by Dharmatic producer Somen Mishra. The series has done exceptionally well -critically and in terms of numbers on Prime Video.

== Personal life ==
Hardik is married to writer-producer Akanksha Tewari.

== Filmography ==
Year	Film	Credits
2021	Decoupled	Director; Web series
2021	Roohi	Director
2020	Paatal Lok	Writer
2020	Kaamyaab	Writer-Director
2017	The Affair (Short)	Writer-Director
2017	Trapped	Writer
2015	Amdavad Ma Famous	Director, producer
2013	Skin Deep (Short)	Director
2010	Chal Meri Luna (Short)	Writer, director

== Awards ==
Apart from the National Film Award for Best Non-Feature Films, Amdavad Ma Famous has received a string of prestigious awards across the international film festival circuit . These include the Best Short Documentary Award at the 2015 Budapest International Documentary Festival, the Jury Prize for Best Short Documentary at the 2015 Al Jazeera International Documentary Festival, in Qatar July 2017, and the Golden Conch for Best Documentary (Up to 60 minutes) and Best Editor in the National Competition at the 14th Mumbai International Film Festival in 2016.

At the 63rd Belgrade Film Festival, it won the Golden Plaque in International Competition for Best Documentary Short. It also won Best Foreign Documentary at the 2016 River Film Festival in Italy, as well as the 2016 All Sports Film Festival in LA. It also won the Special Mention Jury Award at the 2016 International Documentary and Shorts Film Festival of Kerala (IDSFFK) and the 2016 Smile International Film Festival for Children and Youth, New Delhi (SIFFCY).

The film was an official selection and in competition at the 2016 Hot Docs Canadian International Documentary Festival, the 2016 Palm Springs International Festival of Shorts, the 2016 Mumbai International Film Festival (MAMI), and the 2016 Indian Panorama at the International Film Festival of India (IFFI) Goa.

Amdavad Ma Famous was also selected by Académie des César (The French Academy of Cinema) for the PANORAMA DES NUITS EN OR where Mehta got an opportunity to represent India along with 30 other best films representing their countries. As a part of the tour, the film was screened in 9 European Capital Cities.

The film is also available on YouTube
