= Dribbling with Their Future =

Indian Kannada-language documentary film

- Directed by: Jacob Verghese
- Produced by: N. Dinesh Raj Kumar; Mathew Verghese
- Release date: 2016
- Languages: Kannada; English; Hindi

Dribbling with their Future is a 2016 Indian Kannada-language documentary film directed by Jacob Verghese. The film had a low-key release and won the National Film Award for Best Exploration/Adventure Film. The film additionally featured English voiceovers and Hindi.

== Plot ==
Based on a true story, the film follows 14 slum kids from Austin Town, Bengaluru, who are all aged 15 and under and play football as opposed to the more popular cricket. They participate as a team at the Great Wall Cup in Beijing, which has 30 countries participating, and end up finishing as the runner up.
