= Raheja Developers =

Indian real estate development company

Raheja Developers Limited
- Formerly: Raheja Developers Private Limited
- Type: Public currently under insolvency proceedings.
- Industry: Real estate
- Founded: 1990; 36 years ago in Delhi, India
- Founder: Navin Raheja
- Headquarters: Saket, New Delhi, India
- Area served: National Capital Region
- Website: www.raheja.com

Raheja Developers Limited, (RDL), formerly Raheja Developers Private Limited, is an insolvent Indian real estate development company with its headquarters in Delhi, India.

RDL was incorporated in 1990 by Navin Raheja, who currently serves as chairman.

Currently, the company is under insolvency proceedings as the Principal Bench of the National Company Law Tribunal (NCLT) has stated the initiation of insolvency proceedings against the realty firm over default on non-delivery of its Gurugram-based Shilas project. This order came on 19 November 2024. NCLT had also appointed an Interim Resolution Professional (IRP), suspending the board of the realty firm and putting it under the protection of moratorium against lenders, as per the provisions of the Insolvency & Bankruptcy Code.

== History ==
Raheja Developers Limited was incorporated by Navin Raheja in 1990. The group has worked with contractors such as Aedas, Shapoorji-Pallonji and two of its joint-development projects were in collaboration with Tata Group. It had also collaborated with Dubai-based Arabtec Construction.

In 2008, Raheja Developers planned to build a Special Enterprise Zone (SEZ) in Gurgaon at an estimated cost of $660M US. The development was to be on a 255-acre (103 ha) site, but the project did not advance. The Government of India announced denotification of the SEZ project on 29 January 2014.

In 2020, Raheja Revanta, the tallest residential towers by Raheja Developers, was awarded the Luxury Project of the Year by CNN News 18 Real Estate Business Excellence Awards. The project is being built by Arabtec, the makers of Burj Khalifa, Dubai, but a dispute developed between Raheja Developers and Arabtec and the matter of contract-termination reached the Delhi High Court.

Raheja Vanya, located in Gurugram, bagged the Green Project of the Year Award 2020.

=== Controversies ===
In 2010, a raid by Indian Income Tax authorities led to a recovery of tax evasion amounting to ₹80 crore (US$8.3 million). In 2014 investigative portal Cobrapost conducted a sting operation against several real estate developers. It alleged that Raheja was one among the several developers willing to accept black money. Based on this, the Central Board of Direct Taxes ordered a probe into Raheja and 34 other developers.

In 2014, the Prime Minister of India's Office ordered a probe relating to alleged irregularities in a Gurgaon housing project named Raheja Atharva. Subsequently, the State Level Expert Appraisal Committee investigated, and 0.8 acres of the Atharva project was sealed as it was illegally constructed without any Environmental Clearances.

In October 2019, one of Raheja's projects were imposed with a heavy fine, for flouting pollution norms.

In July 2019, Raheja Developers faced insolvency proceedings under the Section 7 of Insolvency and Bankruptcy Code, 2016, on a complaint filed by home buyers on alleged delay in delivery of flats. On enquiry, the NCLAT bench observed that the home buyers had filed the application with intent of refund of money.

The NCLAT reserved its order in the case in September 2019, further removing the Interim Resolution Professional (IRP) in January 2020, thus allowing the board of directors to take back control of the company.
