= The Moth Eaten Howdah of the Tusker =

1986 novel by Indira Goswami

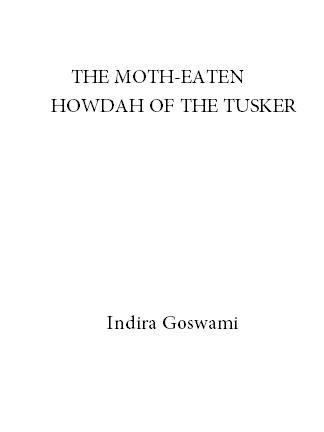
- Author: Indira Goswami
- Original title: দঁতাল হাতীৰ উঁয়ে খোৱা হাওদা (Dontal Hateer Unye Khowda Howda)
- Translator: Indira Goswami
- Language: Assamese
- Subject: Social
- Genre: Fiction, Short Stories
- Publisher: Rupa & Co. (English)
- Publication date: 1986
- Publication place: India
- English publication date: 2004
- Media type: Print (Hardcover)
- Pages: 372
- ISBN: 81-291-0336-2

The Moth Eaten Howdah of the Tusker is a novel written by Indira Goswami in Assamese dialect. Book deals with different social issues of mid twentieth century Kamrup. Published as Dontal Hatir Une Khowa Howdah in 1986, it was translated into English by the author in 2004.

== Plot ==
Set in Palashbari in Kamrup, it revolves around lead protagonist Giribaala and the society around her. As a widow from an Assamese Brahmin family, she narrates her experiences between two worlds: traditionalism and liberalism. The novel explores a powerful picture of change and transition.

== Awards ==
In the year 2000, the Bharatiya Jnanpith conferred Jnanpith Award for this piece of work, among others.

== Adaptations ==
Work is adapted in numerous television serials like Ruma Ghosh's Kamrup Ki Kahani and in 1996 Assamese language film Adajya directed by Santwana Bardoloi .

== See also ==
- Pages Stained With Blood
- The Man from Chinnamasta
