= 44th National Film Awards =

Film awards in India

- Awarded for: Best of Indian cinema in 1996
- Awarded by: Directorate of Film Festivals
- Presented by: Shankar Dayal Sharma (President of India)
- Announced on: 6 May 1997
- Presented on: 15 July 1997
- Official website: dff.nic.in

Highlights
- Best Feature Film: Lal Darja
- Best Non-Feature Film: Sham's Vision
- Best Book: The Eye of the Serpent
- Best Film Critic: M. K. Raghavendra
- Dadasaheb Phalke Award: Sivaji Ganesan
- Most awards: Minsara Kanavu (4)

The 44th National Film Awards, presented by Directorate of Film Festivals, the organisation set up by Ministry of Information and Broadcasting, India to felicitate the best of Indian Cinema released in the year 1996. The awards were announced on 6 May 1997, and presented in July.

== Awards ==
Awards were divided into feature films, non-feature films and books written on Indian cinema.

=== Lifetime Achievement Award ===
Introduced in 1969, the Dadasaheb Phalke Award is the highest award given to recognise the contributions of film personalities towards the development of Indian cinema and for distinguished contributions to the medium, its growth and promotion.

| Name of Award | Image | Awardee(s) | Awarded As | Awards |
|---|---|---|---|---|
| Dadasaheb Phalke Award | | Sivaji Ganesan | Actor | Swarna Kamal, ₹ 100,000 and a Shawl |

=== Feature films ===
Feature films were awarded at All India as well as regional level. For 44th National Film Awards, a Bengali film, Lal Darja won the National Film Award for Best Feature Film, whereas a Tamil film, Minsara Kanavu won the maximum number of awards (4). Following were the awards given in each category:

==== Juries ====
A committee headed by T. Subbarami Reddy was appointed to evaluate the feature films awards. Following were the jury members:

- Jury Members
  - T. Subbarami Reddy (Chairperson) • Basu Chatterjee • Charuhasan • Madhu • Mike Pandey • Nirad N. Mohapatra • Vijaya Mulay
  - Raghav Menon • Sushma Shiromani • Jwngdao Bodosa • M. S. Sathyu • G. Venkateswaran • D. Ramanaidu • Swaraj Lamba • Swapan Kumar Ghosh

==== All India Award ====
Following were the awards given:

===== Golden Lotus Award =====
Official Name: Swarna Kamal

All the awardees are awarded with 'Golden Lotus Award (Swarna Kamal)', a certificate and cash prize.

| Name of Award | Name of Film | Language | Awardee(s) | Cash prize |
|---|---|---|---|---|
| Best Feature Film | Lal Darja | Bengali | Producer: Chitrani Lahiri director: Buddhadeb Dasgupta | ₹ 50,000/- Each |
| Best Feature Film | Citation: For its poetic presentation and exploration of complexities of human relationship in a contemporary urban milieu. | | | |
| Best Debut Film of a Director | Rag Birag | Assamese | Producer: Bhabhen Baruah and Khanin Baruah; Director: Bidyut Chakraborty | ₹ 25,000/- Each |
| Best Debut Film of a Director | Citation: For director's sensitivity in portraying complex human psyche of individual character's in the film. | | | |
| Best Popular Film Providing Wholesome Entertainment | Maachis | Hindi | Producer: R. V. Pandit; Director: Gulzar | ₹ 40,000/- Each |
| Best Popular Film Providing Wholesome Entertainment | Citation: For powerful depiction of Punjab situation, exploring the trauma, conflict and tragedy of the youth in Punjab. | | | |
| Best Children's Film | Damu | Bengali | Producer: Art Films; Director: Raja Sen | ₹ 30,000/- Each |
| Best Children's Film | Citation: For charming story of a simpleton who keeps his word given to a child. | | | |
| Best Direction | Kadhal Kottai | Tamil | Agathiyan | ₹ 50,000/- |
| Best Direction | Citation: For a brilliantly knit plot, maintaining the tempo and rhythms of an unusual love story till end. | | | |

===== Silver Lotus Award =====
Official Name: Rajat Kamal

All the awardees are awarded with 'Silver Lotus Award (Rajat Kamal)', a certificate and cash prize.

| Name of Award | Name of Film | Language | Awardee(s) | Cash prize |
|---|---|---|---|---|
| Best Feature Film on National Integration | Kanakkinavu | Malayalam | Producer: P. V. Gangadharan; Director: Sibi Malayil | ₹ 30,000/- Each |
| Best Feature Film on National Integration | Citation: For its brilliant and bold approach to National Integration and the futility of division in the name of religion. | | | |
| Best Film on Family Welfare | Latthi | Bengali | Producer: Robin Agarwal; Director: Prabhat Roy | ₹ 30,000/- Each |
| Best Film on Family Welfare | Citation: For focusing on the plight of the seniors in the society and how a determined group of pensioners transform the power relations in a family, in a wholesome manner. | | | |
| Best Film on Other Social Issues | Tamanna | Hindi | Producer: Pooja Bhatt; Director: Mahesh Bhatt | ₹ 30,000/- Each |
| Best Film on Other Social Issues | Citation: For depicting the selfless dedication and love of eunuchs for an abandoned child. | | | |
| Best Actor | Indian | Tamil | Kamal Haasan | ₹ 10,000/- |
| Best Actor | Citation: For his double role in the film. His remarkable range in the entire diverse roles shows his excellent calibre as an actor. | | | |
| Best Actress | Maachis | Hindi | Tabu | ₹ 10,000/- |
| Best Actress | Citation: For sensitive portrayal of a woman trapped in the vortex of conflicts. | | | |
| Best Supporting Actor | Agni Sakshi | Hindi | Nana Patekar | ₹ 10,000/- |
| Best Supporting Actor | Citation: For his brilliant performance as an obsessed husband. | | | |
| Best Supporting Actress | Sardari Begum | Urdu | Rajeshwari Sachdev | ₹ 10,000/- |
| Best Supporting Actress | Citation: For her role in the film, in which she depicts the aspirations and agony of a lonely teenage girl. | | | |
| Best Child Artist | Little Soldiers | Telugu | Kavya | ₹ 5,000/- Each |
| Best Child Artist | Citation: For her excellent performance. | | | ₹ 5,000/- Each |
| Best Child Artist | Desadanam | Malayalam | Kumar | ₹ 5,000/- Each |
| Best Child Artist | Citation: For his excellent performance. | | | ₹ 5,000/- Each |
| Best Male Playback Singer | Minsara Kanavu (For the song "Thanga Thamarai") | Tamil | S. P. Balasubrahmanyam | ₹ 10,000/- |
| Best Male Playback Singer | Citation: For his brilliant rendering of the song. | | | |
| Best Female Playback Singer | Minsara Kanavu ( For the song "Maana Madurai - Uh! la la la") | Tamil | K. S. Chithra | ₹ 10,000/- |
| Best Female Playback Singer | Citation: For her soulful rendering of the song. | | | |
| Best Cinematography | • Adajya • Rag Birag | Assamese | Cameraman: Mrinal Kanti Das; Laboratory Processing: Prasad Film Laboratories | ₹ 10,000/- Each |
| Best Cinematography | Citation: For his versatile, imaginative and superb combinations and mood lighting. | | | |
| Best Screenplay | Kadhal Kottai | Tamil | Agathiyan | ₹ 10,000/- |
| Best Screenplay | Citation: For tightly knit and smooth flowing plot with excellent dialogues and razor-sharp tuning. | | | |
| Best Audiography | Desadanam | Malayalam | Krishnan Unni | ₹ 10,000/- |
| Best Audiography | Citation: For excellent use and blending of ambient sound with superb effects, appropriate to the spirit depicted in the film. | | | |
| Best Editing | Rag Birag | Assamese | A. Sreekar Prasad | ₹ 10,000/- |
| Best Editing | Citation: For slickly editing with imagination, setting the pace and flow of the story. | | | |
| Best Art Direction | Indian | Tamil | Thotta Tharani | ₹ 10,000/- |
| Best Art Direction | Citation: For erection of sets and selection of locations perfectly retaining the period depicted in the story and enhancing the huge canvas of the film. | | | |
| Best Costume Design | Kulam | Malayalam | M. Dandapani | ₹ 10,000/- |
| Best Costume Design | Citation: For creating beautiful costumes that are authentic to the period depicted in the film. | | | |
| Best Music Direction | Minsara Kanavu | Tamil | A. R. Rahman | ₹ 10,000/- |
| Best Music Direction | Citation: For innovative compositions breaking all traditions, entering into new era. | | | |
| Best Lyrics | Saaz | Hindi | Javed Akhtar | ₹ 10,000/- |
| Best Lyrics | Citation: For its poetic and traditional expression. | | | |
| Best Special Effects | Indian | Tamil | S. T. Venki | ₹ 10,000/- |
| Best Special Effects | Citation: For recreation of the period images and also for combining new footage with stock footage. | | | |
| Best Choreography | Minsara Kanavu ("Vennilavae Vennilavae" and "Strawberry Kannae") | Tamil | Prabhu Deva | ₹ 10,000/- |
| Best Choreography | Citation: For sensual body language is par excellence and appropriate to unique choreographic patterns. | | | |
| Special Jury Award | Daayraa | Hindi | Amol Palekar (Director) | ₹ 12,500/- Each |
| Special Jury Award | Citation: For the sensitive handling of a challenging theme laying bare the agony and courage of a neglected and marginalised section of our society. | | | ₹ 12,500/- Each |
| Special Jury Award | Sardari Begum | Urdu | Kirron Kher (Actor) | ₹ 12,500/- Each |
| Special Jury Award | Citation: For superb depiction of a dynamic person who breaks shackles of society and achieves excellence in her chosen profession. | | | ₹ 12,500/- Each |
| Special Mention | Sanghat | Bengali | Dolon Roy (Actress) | Certificate Only |
| Special Mention | Citation: For her performance in the film. | | | Certificate Only |
| Special Mention | Adajya | Assamese | Bhagirathee (Actress) | Certificate Only |
| Special Mention | Citation: For her performance in Durga's role in the film. | | | Certificate Only |

==== Regional Awards ====
The award is given to best film in the regional languages in India.

| Name of Award | Name of Film | Awardee(s) | Cash prize |
|---|---|---|---|
| Best Feature Film in Assamese | Adajya | Producer: Nayan Prasad; Director: Santwana Bardoloi | ₹ 20,000/- Each |
| Best Feature Film in Assamese | Citation: For a subtle and sensitive exploration of loneliness trauma and coverage of 3 widows caught in the complex web of ritualistic beliefs. | | |
| Best Feature Film in Bengali | Sanghat | Producer: Pinaki Chaudhuri; Director: Pinaki Chaudhuri | ₹ 20,000/- Each |
| Best Feature Film in Bengali | Citation: For effectively bringing out the trials and tribulations faced by working women in contemporary society. | | |
| Best Feature Film in Hindi | Gudia | Producer: Amit Khanna and Mahesh Bhatt; Director: Gautam Ghose | ₹ 20,000/- Each |
| Best Feature Film in Hindi | Citation: For an unusual exploration into the lives of traditional entertainers and the entwined relationships between the animate and inanimate players that develop into an obsession. | | |
| Best Feature Film in Kannada | America! America!! | Producer: G. Nandakumar; Director: Nagathihalli Chandrashekhar | ₹ 20,000/- Each |
| Best Feature Film in Kannada | Citation: For mature handling of a deftly written script set in USA and India holding up love for one's own country and cultural values. | | |
| Best Feature Film in Malayalam | Desadanam | Producer: Jayaraj; Director: Jayaraj | ₹ 20,000/- Each |
| Best Feature Film in Malayalam | Citation: For depicting in an excellent manner the conflicts between love, traditional bonds and duties, arising out of religious beliefs. | | |
| Best Feature Film in Marathi | Rao Saheb | Producer: K. B. Joshi and Ravindra Surve; Director: Sanjay Surkar | ₹ 20,000/- Each |
| Best Feature Film in Marathi | Citation: For depicting the struggle for power of ambitious politicians in a most effective manner. | | |
| Best Feature Film in Oriya | Shunya Swaroopa | Producer: Alaya Kumar Mohanty; Director: Himanshu Sekhar Khatua | ₹ 20,000/- Each |
| Best Feature Film in Oriya | Citation: For a beautifully photographed film depicting the conflicts of a layman floundering in the world of sanyasias. | | |
| Best Feature Film in Tamil | Kadhal Kottai | Producer: D. Pandian; Director: Agaththian | ₹ 20,000/- Each |
| Best Feature Film in Tamil | Citation: For a charming love story with unusual twists and turns of fate told in an interesting manner with good production values. | | |
| Best Feature Film in Telugu | Ninne Pelladutha | Producer: Nagarjuna; Director: Krishna Vamsi | ₹ 20,000/- Each |
| Best Feature Film in Telugu | Citation: For the innovative way in which a family drama with the contemporary theme is handled. | | |
| Best Feature Film in Urdu | Sardari Begum | Producer: Amit Khanna and Mahesh Bhatt; Director: Shyam Benegal | ₹ 20,000/- Each |
| Best Feature Film in Urdu | Citation: For excellent recreation of an era and showing dedication of an artist to music that defies all orthodox and conservative values. | | |

=== Non-Feature Films ===
Short Films made in any Indian language and certified by the Central Board of Film Certification as a documentary/newsreel/fiction are eligible for non-feature film section.

==== Juries ====
A committee headed by N. S. Thapa was appointed to evaluate the non-feature films awards. Following were the jury members:

- Jury Members
  - N. S. Thapa (Chairperson) • Swapna Sundari • Meera Dewan • Sukumaran • Punathil Kunjabdulla

==== Golden Lotus Award ====
Official Name: Swarna Kamal

All the awardees are awarded with 'Golden Lotus Award (Swarna Kamal)', a certificate and cash prize.

| Name of Award | Name of Film | Language | Awardee(s) | Cash prize |
|---|---|---|---|---|
| Best Non-Feature Film | Sham's Vision | English | Producer: Manu Grover; Director: Shaji N. Karun | ₹ 20,000/- Each |
| Best Non-Feature Film | Citation: For its moving portrayal of an artist's rich inner vision which lights his outer world of darkness. | | | |

==== Silver Lotus Award ====
Official Name: Rajat Kamal

All the awardees are awarded with 'Silver Lotus Award (Rajat Kamal)' and cash prize.

| Name of Award | Name of Film | Language | Awardee(s) | Cash prize |
|---|---|---|---|---|
| Best First Non-Feature Film | Yeh Woh Sahar To Nahin | Hindi | Producer: Film and Television Institute of India; Director: Sudhakar Rao | ₹ 10,000/- Each |
| Best First Non-Feature Film | Citation: For its imaginative use of sound and visuals to capture the undercurrents of human response to outer tensions. | | | |
| Best Biographical Film | Hastir Kanya | Assamese | Producer: Digbijay Medhi; Director: Prabin Hazarika | ₹ 10,000/- Each |
| Best Biographical Film | Citation: For exploring the world of Goalpariya folk music through the life of singer Pratima Borooah Pandey of Gauripur, Assam. | | | |
| Best Arts / Cultural Film | Nauka Charitramu | English | Producer: Saroj Satyanarayan; Director: Saroj Satyanarayan | ₹ 10,000/- Each |
| Best Arts / Cultural Film | Citation: For its innovative cinematic portrayal of three women musicians of Carnatic tradition. | | | |
| Best Film on Social Issues | Silent Screams: A Village Chronicle | English | Producer: Jose Sebastián; Director: O. K. Johnny | ₹ 10,000/- Each |
| Best Film on Social Issues | Citation: For highlighting with sensitivity and sincerity, the agony of the tribal woman of Thrinelli, Kerala. | | | |
| Best Educational / Motivational / Instructional Film | Rabia Chalikkunnu | Malayalam | Producer: Abraham Benhur; Director: Ali Akbar | ₹ 10,000/- Each |
| Best Educational / Motivational / Instructional Film | Citation: For its credible and inspiring portrayal of a young girl who overcomes her physical and social disabilities and becomes a role model for society. | | | |
| Best Investigative Film | N. M. No. 309 Bhiwandi Tragedy | English | Producer: Yash Chowdhary; Director: V. Packiri Swamy | ₹ 10,000/- Each |
| Best Investigative Film | Citation: For the exploration of the issue of health hazards faced by migrant industrial workers. | | | |
| Best Animation Film | The Lost Horizon | Only music | Producer: Arun Gongade; Director: Arun Gongade; Animator: Arun Gongade | ₹ 10,000/- Each |
| Best Animation Film | Citation: For its creative synthesis of animation with Warli folk art in conveying a vital environmental message. | | | |
| Best Short Fiction Film | Vidiyalai Nokki | Tamil | Producer: F and T, V. T. I. N. Chennai; Director: P. Venkatesh | ₹ 10,000/- Each |
| Best Short Fiction Film | Citation: For making an eloquent statement on the gift of sight. | | | ₹ 10,000/- Each |
| Best Short Fiction Film | Athmeeyam | Malayalam | Producer: Film and Television Institute of India; Director: Nandakumar Kavil | ₹ 10,000/- Each |
| Best Short Fiction Film | Citation: For presenting a traditional artist's inner rebellion against the denial of his creative identity. | | | ₹ 10,000/- Each |
| Best Film on Family Welfare | Bhit | Bengali | Producer: Films Division and K. R. G. Films; Director: Glbahar Singh | ₹ 10,000/- Each |
| Best Film on Family Welfare | Citation: For its credible depiction of a rural health worker's efforts in transforming her community. | | | |
| Best Cinematography | Sham's Vision | English | Cameraman: Hari Nair; Laboratory Processing: Prasad Film Lab | ₹ 10,000/- Each |
| Best Cinematography | Citation: For his brilliant use of light and shade, to bring to life even inanimate objects in the film. | | | |
| Best Audiography | Tat Tvam Asi | Hindi and English | Nihar R. Samal | ₹ 10,000/- |
| Best Audiography | Citation: For his restrained, balanced and multi-layered soundtrack. | | | |
| Best Editing | Nauka Charitramu | English | A. Sreekar Prasad | ₹ 10,000/- |
| Best Editing | Citation: For knitting together harmoniously into an unbroken visual flow in the film. | | | |
| Special Jury Award | Dhatu Jhar '96 | Bengali | Nilotpal Majumdar (Producer, Director and Cinematographer) | ₹ 10,000/- |
| Special Jury Award | Citation: For his bold and experimental exploration of the dilemma between discovery and destruction. | | | |

=== Best Writing on Cinema ===
The awards aim at encouraging study and appreciation of cinema as an art form and dissemination of information and critical appreciation of this art-form through publication of books, articles, reviews etc.

==== Juries ====
A committee headed by Khalid Mohamed was appointed to evaluate the writing on Indian cinema. Following were the jury members:

- Jury Members
  - Khalid Mohamed (Chairperson) • Pritiman Sarkar • V. K. Madhavan Kutty

==== Golden Lotus Award ====
Official Name: Swarna Kamal

All the awardees are awarded with 'Golden Lotus Award (Swarna Kamal)' and cash prize.

| Name of Award | Name of Book | Language | Awardee(s) | Cash prize |
|---|---|---|---|---|
| Best Book on Cinema | The Eye of the Serpent | English | Author: S. Theodore Baskaran; Publisher: East West Books Pvt. Ltd. | ₹ 15,000/- Each |
| Best Book on Cinema | Citation: For the methodically researched books on Tamil films which informs and enlightens the reader about one of the most prolific cinemas of our country which has kept re-defining itself over the decades. | | | |
| Best Film Critic | | | M. K. Raghavendra | ₹ 15,000/- |
| Best Film Critic | Citation: For his provocative and iconoclastic writing, which inspires debate and discussion, so rare in film criticism today. | | | |

=== Awards not given ===
Following were the awards not given as no film was found to be suitable for the award:

- Best Film on Environment / Conservation / Preservation
- Best Feature Film in Manipuri
- Best Feature Film in Punjabi
- Best Feature Film in English
- Best Non-Feature Film Direction
- Best Anthropological / Ethnographic Film
- Best Promotional Film
- Best Scientific Film
- Best Environment / Conservation / Preservation Film
- Best Agricultural Film
- Best Historical Reconstruction / Compilation Film
- Best Exploration / Adventure Film
- Best Music Direction
