= Chandralekha (soundtrack) =

Soundtrack album by S. Rajeswara Rao and M. D. Parthasarathy
- Released: 1948
- Genre: Film soundtrack
- Languages: Tamil; Hindi
- Label: EMI

Chandralekha is the soundtrack album for the 1948 film of the same name. It was composed by S. Rajeswara Rao, with lyrics by Papanasam Sivan and Kothamangalam Subbu. The background score was composed by M. D. Parthasarathy, who was assisted by R. Vaidyanathan and B. Das Gupta. The soundtrack album features 11 tracks in the original Tamil version, whereas the Hindi version has 13 tracks.

== Development ==
Rajeswara Rao recalled in a 1993 interview for The Hindu that it took him over a year to compose the film's music, with much of his time devoted to the drum-dance scene: "As the dancers performed, we used to rehearse and compose the music. It was done with incredibly few instruments. We used a piano, ten double-bass violins, and drums from Africa, Egypt, and Persia which we have acquired from an African War troupe." Rao was paid ₹1,500 as a salary, during the film's production.

For the Hindi soundtrack, S. S. Vasan offered most of the song to Uma Devi, who later became popularly known as Tun Tun. She initially hesitated, feeling that "[they] were beyond her capabilities", but was supported by Rajeswara Rao (who "worked hard on her"). The film was a breakthrough for Uma Devi, despite breaching her contract with producer Abdur Rashid Kardar, who terminated her contract in retaliation. This and the "dwindling fortunes" of the film industry after India's independence from the British Raj eventually ended her career in playback singing.

== Composition ==
The music was influenced by Carnatic and Hindustani music, Latin American and Portuguese folk music and Strauss waltzes. According to M. K. Raghavendra, Chandralekha has "snatches from [Richard] Wagner and [Nikolai] Rimsky-Korsakov (Scherezade) being used at dramatic moments." "Naattiya Kuthirai", not originally part of the film, was added during final production. Sundari Bai spent over a month rehearsing the song. M. D. Parthasarathy was the sole singer of "Aathoram Kodikkalam" and co-singer of "Naattiya Kuthirai". J. Cooling Rajaiah played accordion and piano in the film's gypsy song. The circus chorus was adapted from "The Donkey Serenade" in Robert Z. Leonard's 1937 film, The Firefly. "Sanjh Ki Bela", from the Hindi soundtrack, is loosely based on "Sanjh Ki Bela Panchhi Akela" from Jwar Bhata (1944).

== Reception ==
Chandralekha's music helped make it one of the most-successful Indian musical films of the 1940s, and it "created an atmosphere for a number of music directors influenced by Western music" in Tamil cinema. In his 1997 book, Starlight, Starbright: The Early Tamil Cinema, Randor Guy said that Parthasarathy and Rajeswara Rao "created a fine blend of lilting music of many schools." Writing for Screen in April 1998, film historian M. Bhaktavatsala described Chandralekha's songs as "distinct and standing on [their] own, with barely any background score attempting to interlink anything, just periods of silence." Historian V. Sriram stated in 2018 that, although the film had no memorable songs, "Aayilo Pakiriyama", sung by Krishnan, Madhuram and Sundari Bai, was his favourite one.

== Track listing ==
Tamil
No.	Title	Singer(s)	Length
1.	"Indrae Enathu Kuthukalam"	T. R. Rajakumari	1:09
2.	"Aathoram Kodikkalam"	M. D. Parthasarathy, S. S. Mani Bhagavathar	2:23
3.	"Padathey Padathey Nee"	M. S. Sundari Bai	3:29
4.	"Naattiya Kuthirai"	M. D. Parthasarathy, M. S. Sundari Bai	4:09
5.	"Namasthey Sutho"	Chorus	4:10
6.	"Group Dance" (Instrumental)	—	1:25
7.	"Aayilo Pakiriyama"	N. S. Krishnan, T. A. Mathuram, M. S. Sundari Bai	3:10
8.	"Manamohana Saaranae"	T. R. Rajakumari	2:30
9.	"Murasu Aatam (Drum Dance)" (Instrumental)	—	5:59
10.	"Aaduven Mayilaayi Naan"	T. R. Rajakumari, Mayavaram Venu	2:31
11.	"Vaanamengume Nirainthu"	T. R. Rajakumari, Mayavaram Venu	2:20

Hindi
No.	Title	Singer(s)	Length
1.	"Sajna Re Aaja Re"	Uma Devi	3:04
2.	"Manbhavan Sawan Aaya"	Uma Devi	3:09
3.	"O Chand Mere"	Uma Devi	3:21
4.	"Maai Re Main To Madhuban Mein"	Uma Devi	2:33
5.	"Saanjh Ki Bela Jiya Akela"	Uma Devi, T. A. Mothi	3:07
6.	"Mera Husn Lootne Aaya Albela"	Zohrabai Ambalewali, T. A. Mothi	2:41
7.	"Tu Nazar Milaye"	Chorus	1:09
8.	"Nadiya Kinare Ram Bagiya"	Bharat Vyas	2:15
9.	"Mat Gaa Re Mat Gaa"	Chorus	3:31
10.	"Bichhde Dil Aaj Mile"	Uma Devi, T. A. Mothi	1:22
11.	"O Saajna Kya Kiya"	Uma Devi	3:28
12.	"Naache Ghoda Naache"	Geeta Dutt, T. A. Mothi	4:03
13.	"Namasthey Sutho" (Group Dance)	Chorus	4:37

== Bibliography ==
- Garga, B. D. (2005). Art Of Cinema. Penguin Books. ISBN 978-0-670-05853-2.
- Baskaran, S. Theodore (1996). The eye of the serpent: an introduction to Tamil cinema. East West Books. OCLC 1129458207.
- Raghavendra, M. K. (2009). 50 Indian Film Classics. HarperCollins. ISBN 978-81-7223-866-7.
- Rajadhyaksha, Ashish; Willemen, Paul (1998) [1994]. Encyclopaedia of Indian Cinema (PDF). Oxford University Press. ISBN 0-19-563579-5.
- Guy, Randor (1997). Starlight, Starbright: The Early Tamil Cinema. Amra Publishers.
- Vijayakar, Rajiv (2009). The History of Indian Film Music: A Showcase of the Very Best in Hindi Cinema. Bennett, Coleman & Company. ISBN 9788189906818.
