= Kamrup Ki Kahani =

- Genre: Drama
- Written by: The Moth Eaten Howdah of the Tusker by Indira Goswami
- Directed by: Ruma Ghosh
- Starring: see below
- Country of origin: India
- Original language: Hindi

Production
- Camera setup: Multi-camera
- Running time: approximately 25 minutes

Original release
- Network: DD National

Kamrup Ki Kahani is an Indian soap opera that aired in the 1990s, directed by Ruma Ghosh.

== Plot ==
Set in Palashbari, Kamrup, Kamrup Ki Kahani divulges the story of a young Brahmin widow and society around her. It narrates her struggle between two worlds, traditionalism and liberalism.

== Crew ==
Director: Ruma Ghosh

== Cast ==
Character	Actor
Giribaala	Nandita Das
Gosain	Nipon Goswami
	Chetana Das
	Nathan Scott

== See also ==
- Ramayan, 1987 TV series
- Mahabharat, 1988 TV series
- Shaktimaan
