= 19th National Film Awards =

Indian ceremony celebrating cinema of 1971

- Awarded for: Best of Indian cinema in 1971
- Awarded by: Ministry of Information and Broadcasting
- Presented by: Indira Gandhi (Prime Minister of India)
- Announced on: 1 May 1972
- Official website: dff.nic.in

Highlights
- Best Feature Film: Seemabaddha
- Dadasaheb Phalke Award: Prithviraj Kapoor
- Most awards: Reshma Aur Shera (3)

The 19th National Film Awards, presented by Ministry of Information and Broadcasting, India to felicitate the best of Indian Cinema released in the year 1971.

== Juries ==
Four different committees were formed based on the film making sectors in India, mainly based in Bombay, Calcutta and Madras along with the central committee for all India level. For 19th National Film Awards.

- Jury Members: Central
- Jury Regional: Bombay
- Jury Regional: Calcutta
- Jury Regional: Madras

== Awards ==
Awards were divided into feature films and non-feature films.

President's Gold Medal for the All India Best Feature Film is now better known as National Film Award for Best Feature Film, whereas President's Gold Medal for the Best Documentary Film is analogous to today's National Film Award for Best Non-Feature Film. For children's films, Prime Minister's Gold Medal is now given as National Film Award for Best Children's Film. At the regional level, President's Silver Medal for Best Feature Film is now given as National Film Award for Best Feature Film in a particular language. Certificate of Merit in all the categories is discontinued over the years.

=== Lifetime Achievement Award ===
Name of Award	Image	Awardee(s)	Awarded As	Awards
Dadasaheb Phalke Award		Prithviraj Kapoor (Posthumously)	Actor	₹11,000, a shawl and a plaque

=== Feature films ===
Feature films were awarded at All India as well as regional level. For 19th National Film Awards, a Bengali film Seemabadha won the President's Gold Medal for the All India Best Feature Film.

==== All India Award ====
Following were the awards given:

Name of Award	Name of Film	Language	Awardee(s)	Awards
Best Feature Film	Seemabaddha	Bengali	Producer and director:Satyajit Ray	Gold Medal and ₹40,000
Second Best Feature Film	Anubhav	Hindi	Producer:	₹15,000 and a medal
Second Best Feature Film	Anubhav	Hindi	Director: Basu Bhattacharya	₹5,000 and a plaque
Best Children's Film	Wings of Fire	English	Producer:	₹30,000 and a medal
Best Children's Film	Wings of Fire	English	Director:	₹5,000 and a plaque
Best Feature Film on National Integration	Do Boond Pani	Hindi	Producer: K. A. Abbas	₹30,000 and a medal
Best Feature Film on National Integration	Do Boond Pani	Hindi	Director: K. A. Abbas	₹10,000 and a plaque
Best Actor (Bharat Award)	Rikshakaran	Tamil	M. G. Ramachandran	A figurine
Best Actress (Urvashi Award)	Reshma Aur Shera	Hindi	Waheeda Rahman	A figurine
Best Child Artist	Ajab Tujhe Sarkar	Marathi	Master Sachin	A plaque
Best Direction	Vamsha Vriksha	Kannada	• B. V. Karanth • Girish Karnad	₹ 5,000 and a plaque
Best Music Direction	Reshma Aur Shera	Hindi	Jaidev	₹ 5,000 and a plaque
Best Male Playback Singer	Nimantran	Bengali	Hemanta Mukherjee	A plaque
Best Female Playback Singer	Savale Samali	Tamil	P. Susheela	A plaque
Best Screenplay	Ekoni	Bengali	Tapan Sinha	₹5,000 and a plaque
Best Cinematography (Black and White)	Anubhav	Bengali	Nandu Battacharya	₹5,000 and a plaque
Best Cinematography (Color)	Reshma Aur Shera	Hindi	Ramachandra	₹5,000 and a plaque
Best Lyrics	Nanak Dhukhia Sab Sansar	Punjabi	Prem Dhavan	₹10,000 and a certificate

==== Regional Award ====
The awards were given to the best films made in the regional languages of India. For feature films in English, Gujarati, Kashmiri, Oriya and Punjabi language, President's Silver Medal for Best Feature Film was not given.

Name of Award	Name of Film	Awardee(s)	Awards
Best Feature Film in Assamese	Aranya	Producer:	₹5,000
Best Feature Film in Assamese	Aranya	Director:	Silver Medal
Best Feature Film in Bengali	Nimantran	Producer:	₹5,000
Best Feature Film in Bengali	Nimantran	Director: Tarun Majumdar	Silver Medal
Best Feature Film in Hindi	Phir Bhi	Producer:	₹5,000
Best Feature Film in Hindi	Phir Bhi	Director: Shivendra Sinha	Silver Medal
Best Feature Film in Kannada	Vamsha Vriksha	Producer: G. V. Iyer	₹5,000
Best Feature Film in Kannada	Vamsha Vriksha	Director: B. V. Karanth and Girish Karnad	Silver Medal
Best Feature Film in Malayalam	Karakana Kadhal	Producer:	₹5,000
Best Feature Film in Malayalam	Karakana Kadhal	Director:	Silver Medal
Best Feature Film in Marathi	Shantata! Court Chalu Aahe	Producer:	₹5,000
Best Feature Film in Marathi	Shantata! Court Chalu Aahe	Director: Arvind Deshpande	Silver Medal
Best Feature Film in Tamil	Veguli Pen	Producer: Abdul Kabar	₹5,000
Best Feature Film in Tamil	Veguli Pen	Director: S. S. Devadass	Silver Medal
Best Feature Film in Telugu	Mattilo Manikyam	Producer: Chalam	₹5,000
Best Feature Film in Telugu	Mattilo Manikyam	Director: B. V. Prasad	Silver Medal

=== Non-Feature films ===
Following were the awards given:

==== Short films ====
Name of Award	Name of Film	Language	Awardee(s)	Awards
Best Film on Social Documentation	A Village Smiles	English	Producer:	₹5,000 and a medal
Best Film on Social Documentation	A Village Smiles	English	Director:	₹2,000 and a plaque

=== Awards not given ===
Following were the awards not given as no film was found to be suitable for the award

- Best Story Writer
- Best Film on Family Welfare
- Best Experimental Film
- Best Animation Film
- President's Silver Medal for Best Feature Film in English
- President's Silver Medal for Best Feature Film in Oriya
- President's Silver Medal for Best Feature Film in Punjabi
