= Klanta Aparahna =

- Directed by: Manmohan Mahapatra
- Written by: Manmohan Mahapatra
- Produced by: Dynamic Studio
- Starring: Sachidananda Rath; Kanak Panigrahi; Kishori Devi
- Cinematography: Ranajit Ray
- Music by: Shantanu Mahapatra
- Release date: 1985
- Running time: 93 minutes
- Country: India
- Language: Odia

Klanta Aparahna(1985) (English Tired Afternoon) is a contemporary Oriya film directed by Manmohan Mahapatra, story of everyday life in a small village in Orissa.

== Cast ==
- Kanak Panigrahi – Neeru
- Sachidananda Rath
- Kishori Devi – Neeru's Grand mother
- Madhukar Goshthi
- Master Sushil

== Participation ==
- Feminist film festival in Mumbai.
