= Anjuli Shukla =

Indian cinematographer and film director

- Born: Lucknow, Uttar Pradesh, India
- Education: University of Lucknow, FTII
- Occupations: Cinematographer, Film Director
- Awards: National Film Awards

Anjuli Shukla is an Indian cinematographer and film director. She is the first and till date the only Indian woman who has won the National Film Award for Best Cinematography. Kutty Srank, her debut film, won her the National Film Award for Best Cinematography in 2010. Her recent direction, ‘Happy Mothers Day’ a feature film by Children's Film Society, India (CFSI) was the opening film for the 19th Edition of the International Children's Film Festival India (ICFFI). An alumnus of the Film and Television Institute of India, Shukla started her career as an assistant to cinematographer and director Santosh Sivan before making her feature film debut.

== Biography ==
Shukla was born in Lucknow into a family that was not related to film industry. She was interested in films right from her childhood and completed her graduation from the University of Lucknow, Lucknow. Upon graduation, she decided to join the Film and Television Institute of India (FTII) to do a course in cinematography, which she felt was an ideal platform to express her "creativity". Her family was supportive of her decision. Shukla's diploma film at the FTII was premiered at the competition section of the Camerimage film festival. Upon completing her course at the FTII, she joined Santosh Sivan as an apprentice and went on to assist him in various films including two Hollywood productions – The Mistress of Spices and Before the Rains. She was the second unit camerawoman for Mani Ratnam's Tamil–Hindi bilingual films Raavan and Raavanan (2010). She got a break as an independent cinematographer through Kutty Srank, a Malayalam film directed by Shaji N. Karun. The film had the distinction of being the first in Malayalam to be shot by a woman cinematographer. Shukla's work fetched her the Best Cinematography at the 57th National Film Awards in 2010. She was the first female to be awarded in the category. After Kutty Srank, she joined with Santosh Sivan for Urumi, a period drama.

== Filmography ==
=== Director ===
- Happy Mother's Day, a feature film by Children's Film Society India (CFSI) (2015)
  - Selected for 12th International Zurich Film Festival (ZFF)
  - Opening film for the 19th International Children's Film Festival India (ICFFI)

=== Cinematographer ===
- Kutty Srank (2010)

=== Camera and Electrical Department or Second Unit Department ===
- Anandabhadram (2005) - Malayalam
- The Mistress of Spices (film) (2005) - Hindi/English
- Before the Rains (2007) - English /Malayalam
- Prarambha (2007)-Kannada
- Tahaan (2008)-Hindi
- Raavan (2010)-Hindi/Tamil
- Urumi (film) (2010)-Malayalam
- Pehla Sitara (delayed)

== Awards ==
=== National ===
National Film Award for Best Cinematography

- 2010 - Kutty Srank (Malayalam) – Best Cinematography

=== International ===
Nominated:

Golden Tadpole for Best Cinematography, Camerimage

- 2004 – Pre-Mortem – Golden Tadpole for Best Cinematography, Camerimage
