= Neeraba Jhada =

- Directed by: Manmohan Mahapatra
- Produced by: Manmohan Mahapatra
- Starring: Hemanta Das; Robin Das; Jaya Swami; Manimala
- Cinematography: B. Bindhani; Rajsekhar
- Edited by: Satyendra Mohanty
- Music by: Shantanu Mahapatra
- Distributed by: National Film Development Corporation of India
- Release date: 1984
- Running time: 120 minutes
- Country: India
- Language: Odia

Neeraba Jhada (The Silent Storm) is a 1984 award-winning Indian Oriya film directed by Manmohan Mahapatra, which depicts the realities of village life, where dehumanized peasants dream of a more fulfilling life.

== Plot ==
In a remote village in Orissa, the villagers condition remains poor, as poverty and illiteracy have fostered their dependence on superstition. Most of the villagers have mortgaged their land to the landlord Janrdhan. Fear of traditional authority and sense of abject helplessness keep the villagers from protesting against their condition. perhaps it is such as muted rebellion that sent Malia mad. Janardhan's greed and the inability of the villagers to protest in the face of injustice, creates a situation where many of the villagers are forced to become contract labourers and the leave the village to earn a livelihood. Haria. who has no other means of raising money to give a dowry at his daughter's marriage, has to join this band. Heleaves his family with a heavy heart. His young son exclaims,‘Father, you will go to the city' You will see the wide roads, the big buildings, the coloured lights!. Hiding his grief, Haria promises to bring back gifts for them from the city.

in the meanwhile Bhamar (played by Hemant Das) antagonizes Janardhan, when to pay back his loan he goes to work in the stone quarry instead of working for free on Janardhan's land. Janardan sees to it that he loses his Job. His real intention is to take over the last piece of land that is not mortgaged to him. Bhamar's land. While Bhamar fights for his survival in the village, his daughter Phoola finds herself drawn towards a young man in the employ of Janardhan. One day when they meet in secret, they me spied upon and Phoola is recognized. There is in scandal in the village as a result, Janardhan takes this opportunity to get Bhamar ostracized in the village, especially since he has tried to defend his daughter in public against Janardhan's allegations.

When Bhamar discovers that the allegations are true, that it really was his daughter who was meeting a man in the village in secret, he is shattered. He goes back to Janardhan to mollify him. But Janardhan is not prepared to listen. He makes it clear that unless Bhamar clears his loan, he will not he allowed to enter his own fields. He will also have to pay the penalty for his arrogance in the next village meeting. Left with no other alternative, Bhamar decides to leave the village and take up the job of a contract labourer. But before Bhamar can leave the village Haria, a contract labourer comes back suddenly one night. He has been ill, but they forced him to work all the same. Haria escaped to come home and rest for a few days, though he knows that he cannot escape the clutches of his new employers for long. The children huddle around him in the hope of gifts, but their father has come empty-handed. Looking at his son in despair he says. 'Yes. son. I have seen the wide roads and the coloured lights. But they took us fur away from them to a place where one has to work till the time, from dawn to dusk.

Bhamar and Phoola wait at the little station near the village. Phoola will go to her uncle's home and Bhamar to hard, back-breaking toil. As they wait for the train, Phoola weeps. 'Don't cry, my daughter' says her father. 'Look! Look, there lies our village. My grandfather was born there, so was my father. I was born there too. I have to come back there one day to take possession of my land!'

== Cast and crew ==
- Production: Chayyadhwani Productions
- Story: Nandalal Mohapatra
- Direction and Screenplay: Manmohan Mahapatra
- Camera: Rai Shekhar and B. Bindhani
- Music: Shantanu Mahapatra
- Sound: Gopinath Das and Bani Mohanry
- Art Direction: Ashinn Basu and Sampad Nlahapatra
- Editing: Satyendra Mohanty
- Lead Actors: Hemanta Das, Niranjan Patnaik, Robin Das, Jaya Swami, Manimala

== Review ==
In Neeraba Jhada, Manmohan Mahapatra shifts his interests to an entirely rural environment, depicting a universe of deprivation within the closed atmosphere of a single small village in Orissa. Bhamar and Haria are the archetypal peasants of India trapped by their ignorance and poverty into a cycle of exploitation which continues to push them towards a dehumanized existence. Yet they have the audacity to dream of a more fulfilling further. Their latent instinct for survival will not be crushed under the soul-destroying drudgery of their lives. Haria's little son dreams of the wide roads and coloured lights of the city. Phoola desires a home of her own with the man she loves. Bhamar knows he must come back to till his own land. Generations of submission t the obsolete feudal laws of the land has still not managed to annihilate the human spirit. Bhamar and Haria will not give up their struggle. Within their own confined worlds, they will continue t battle against the forces that daily attempt to snatch away their last possession, their human dignity. But one day the many individuals worlds will unite. The silent storm will break. its resonance will sweep away the dusts of a decaying system and make place for a new generation whose dreams will be their reality.

Manmohan Mahapatra's "Neeraba Jhada" ("The Silent Storm"), a beautiful, grueling film about a peasant's brave stand against a greedy landlord's determination to grab the peasant's holdings, the last bit of property in the region not in his possession. This is as uncompromising a film imaginable about a people mired in virtual slavery, upheld by ignorance, superstition and tradition, yet it also is a tribute to humanity's strength to endure and even to hope.

== Awards & participation ==
- National Film Award for Best Feature Film in Oriya(1984) - Silver Lotus for best Odia film
- National Film Award for Best Cinematography (1984) (black & white category)

== See also ==
National Film Award for Best Feature Film in Oriya
