= National Film Award for Best Cinematography =

Indian film award

- National award for contributions to Indian Cinema
- Sponsored by: National Film Development Corporation of India
- Formerly called: Award for excellence in Cinematography (1967–1976)
- Rewards: Rajat Kamal (Silver Lotus); ₹2,00,000
- First award: 1967
- Most recent winner: Shehnad Jalal, Bramayugam (2024)

The National Film Award for Best Cinematography is one of the National Film Awards presented annually by the National Film Development Corporation of India. It is one of several awards presented for feature films and awarded with Rajat Kamal (Silver Lotus).

The award was instituted in 1967, at 15th National Film Awards and awarded annually for films produced in the year across the country, in all Indian languages. Till 34th National Film Awards, awards were given for Black-and-white as well as Color motion picture film. Since 37th National Film Awards, Laboratory Processing are also awarded under the same category. From 70th National Film Awards, the primary/main cinematographer is alone awarded, while eliminating the existing two sub-categories.

== Multiple winners ==
4 wins: K. K. Mahajan, Avik Mukhopadhyay, Santosh Sivan

3 wins: Soumendu Roy, Apurba Kishore Bir, Madhu Ambat, Venu

2 wins: Ramachandra, Balu Mahendra, Ashok Mehta, Sudeep Chatterjee

== Recipients ==
Award includes 'Rajat Kamal' (Silver Lotus) and cash prize. The only female who has won this award is Anjuli Shukla, who won the award for her debut film, Kutty Srank (2010). Prasad Film Lab has been awarded eight times for the laboratory processing. Following are the award winners over the years:

| * | Indicates Black-and-white feature film |

=== 1967–2021 ===
List of award recipients, showing the year (award ceremony), film(s) and language(s)
| Year | Cameraman(s) | Laboratory Processing | Film(s) | Language(s) | Refs. |
|---|---|---|---|---|---|
| 1967 (15th) | Ramachandra | – | Bambai Raat Ki Bahon Mein | Hindi | |
| 1967 (15th) | M. N. Malhotra | – | Hamraaz | Hindi | |
| 1968 (16th) | Nariman Irani | – | Saraswatichandra | Hindi | |
| 1968 (16th) | K. S. Prasad | – | Thillana Mohanambal | Tamil | |
| 1969 (17th) | K. K. Mahajan | – | Sara Akash | Hindi | |
| 1969 (17th) | Marcus Bartley | – | Shanti Nilayam | Tamil | |
| 1970 (18th) | K. K. Mahajan | – | Uski Roti | Hindi | |
| 1970 (18th) | Radhu Karmakar | – | Mera Naam Joker | Hindi | |
| 1971 (19th) | Nando Bhattacharya | – | Anubhav | Hindi | |
| 1971 (19th) | Ramachandra | – | Reshma Aur Shera | Hindi | |
| 1972 (20th) | Mankada Ravi Varma | – | Swayamvaram | Malayalam | |
| 1972 (20th) | K. K. Mahajan | – | Maya Darpan | Hindi | |
| 1973 (21st) | Apurba Kishore Bir | – | 27 Down | Hindi | |
| 1973 (21st) | Soumendu Roy | – | Ashani Sanket | Bengali | |
| 1974 (22nd) | K. K. Mahajan | – | Chorus | Bengali | |
| 1974 (22nd) | Soumendu Roy | – | Sonar Kella | Bengali | |
| 1975 (23rd) | B. S. Lokanath | – | Apoorva Raagangal | Tamil | |
| 1975 (23rd) | Ishan Arya | – | Muthyala Muggu | Telugu | |
| 1976 (24th) | P. S. Nivas | – | Mohiniyaattam | Malayalam | |
| 1976 (24th) | S. Ramachandra | – | Rishya Shringa | Kannada | |
| 1977 (25th) | Balu Mahendra | – | Kokila | Kannada | |
| 1977 (25th) | Soumendu Roy | – | Shatranj Ke Khilari | Hindi | |
| 1978 (26th) | Shaji N. Karun | – | Thampu | Malayalam | |
| 1978 (26th) | Govind Nihalani | – | Junoon | Hindi | |
| 1979 (27th) | Kamal Nayak | – | Neem Annapurna | Bengali | |
| 1979 (27th) | Rajan Kinagi | – | Shodh | Hindi | |
| 1980 (28th) | Sivan | – | Yagam | Malayalam | |
| 1980 (28th) | Ashok Kumar | – | Nenjathai Killathe | Tamil | |
| 1981 (29th) | Shripati R. Bhat | – | Mooru Darigalu | Kannada | |
| 1981 (29th) | Ashok Mehta | – | 36 Chowringhee Lane | English | |
| 1982 (30th) | Balu Mahendra | – | Moondram Pirai | Tamil | |
| 1983 (31st) | B. Bindhani | – | Neeraba Jhada | Oriya | |
| 1983 (31st) | Raj Shekhar | – | Neeraba Jhada | Oriya | |
| 1983 (31st) | Madhu Ambat | – | Adi Shankaracharya | Sanskrit | |
| 1984 (32nd) | Jehangir Choudhary | – | Holi | Hindi | |
| 1985 (33rd) | Subrata Mitra | – | New Delhi Times | Hindi | |
| 1986 (34th) | Venu | – | Namukku Parkkan Munthiri Thoppukal | Malayalam | |
| 1986 (34th) | Venu | – | Amma Ariyan | Malayalam | |
| 1987 (35th) | P. C. Sreeram | – | Nayakan | Tamil | |
| 1988 (36th) | Apurba Kishore Bir | – | Daasi | Telugu | |
| 1989 (37th) | Virendra Saini | Adlabs | Salim Langde Pe Mat Ro | Hindi | |
| 1990 (38th) | Santosh Sivan | Vijay Colour Lab | Perumthachan | Malayalam | |
| 1991 (39th) | Apurba Kishore Bir | Prasad Film Lab | Aadi Mimansa | Oriya | |
| 1992 (40th) | Venu | Prasad Film Lab | Miss Beatty's Children | English | |
| 1993 (41st) | Venu | Prasad Film Lab | Ponthan Mada | Malayalam | |
| 1994 (42nd) | K. V. Anand | Gemini Color Lab | Thenmavin Kombath | Malayalam | |
| 1995 (43rd) | Santosh Sivan | Gemini Color Lab | Kaalapani | Malayalam | |
| 1996 (44th) | Mrinal Kanti Das | Prasad Film Lab | • Adajya • Rag Birag | Assamese | |
| 1997 (45th) | Santosh Sivan | Prasad Film Lab | Iruvar | Tamil | |
| 1998 (46th) | Santosh Sivan | Gemini Color Lab | Dil Se.. | Hindi | |
| 1999 (47th) | Anil Mehta | Adlabs | Hum Dil De Chuke Sanam | Hindi | |
| 2000 (48th) | Ashok Mehta | Prasad Film Lab | Moksha | Hindi | |
| 2001 (49th) | Ramachandra Halkare | Prasad Film Lab | Dweepa | Kannada | |
| 2002 (50th) | Abhik Mukhopadhyay | Rainbow Color Lab | Patalghar | Bengali | |
| 2003 (51st) | Avik Mukhopadhyay | Rainbow Colour Lab | Bhalo Theko | Bengali | |
| 2004 (52nd) | Mahesh Aney | Adlabs | Swades | Hindi | |
| 2005 (53rd) | Madhu Ambat | Prasad Film Lab | Sringaram | Tamil | |
| 2006 (54th) | Gautam Ghose | Rainbow Colour Lab | Yatra | Hindi | |
| 2007 (55th) | Shanker Raman | Deluxe Laboratories Inc. | Frozen | Hindi | |
| 2008 (56th) | Abhik Mukhopadhyay | Filmlab | Antaheen | Bengali | |
| 2009 (57th) | Anjuli Shukla | Adlabs | Kutty Srank | Malayalam | |
| 2010 (58th) | Madhu Ambat | – | Adaminte Makan Abu | Malayalam | |
| 2011 (59th) | Satya Rai Nagpaul | Reliance MediaWorks | Anhe Ghore Da Daan | Punjabi | |
| 2012 (60th) | Sudheer Palsane | Prasad Studios | Ko:Yad | Mishing | |
| 2013 (61st) | Rajeev Ravi | – | Liar's Dice | Hindi | |
| 2014 (62nd) | Sudeep Chatterjee | – | Chotushkone | Bengali | |
| 2015 (63rd) | Sudeep Chatterjee | – | Bajirao Mastani | Hindi | |
| 2016 (64th) | Tirru | – | 24 | Tamil | |
| 2017 (65th) | Nikhil S. Praveen | – | Bhayanakam | Malayalam | |
| 2018 (66th) | M. J. Radhakrishnan | – | Olu | Malayalam | |
| 2019 (67th) | Girish Gangadharan | – | Jallikattu | Malayalam | |
| 2020 (68th) | Supratim Bhol | – | Avijatrik | Bengali | |
| 2021 (69th) | Avik Mukhopadhyay | – | Sardar Udham | Hindi | |

=== 2022–present ===
Since the 70th National Film Awards, cinematographer alone is awarded.

List of award recipients, showing the year (award ceremony), film(s) and language(s)
| Year | Recipient(s) | Film(s) | Language(s) | Refs. |
|---|---|---|---|---|
| 2022 (70th) | Ravi Varman | Ponniyin Selvan: I | Tamil | |
| 2023 (71st) | Prasantanu Mohapatra | The Kerala Story | Hindi | |
| 2024 (72nd) | Shehnad Jalal | Bramayugam | Malayalam | |
