= Tarini Choudhury Govt. Girls H.S. & M.P. School =

Tarini Choudhary Government Girls Higher Secondary and Multipurpose School
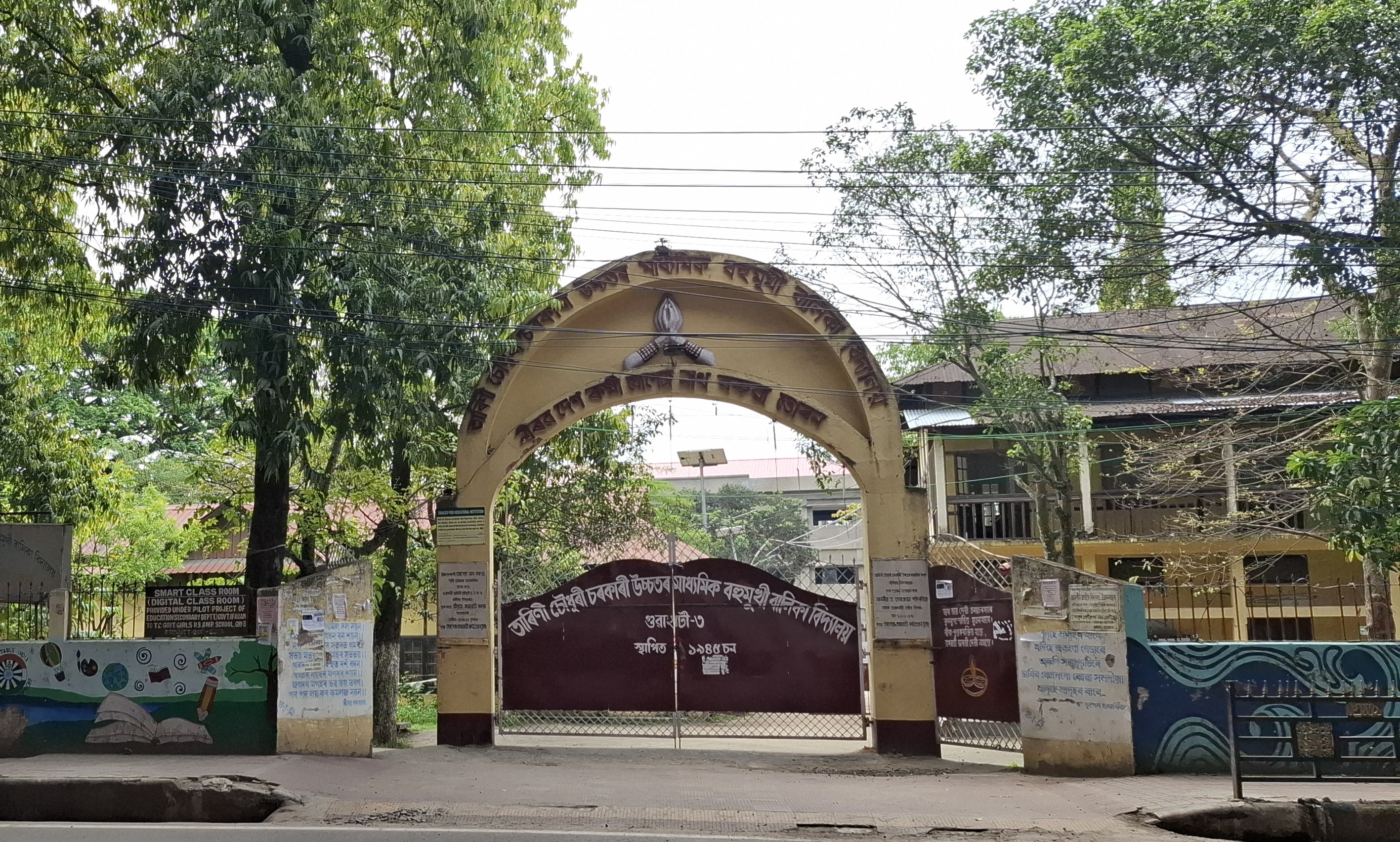
- Guwahati, Assam; India

Information
- Type: Public School
- Established: 1945; 81 years ago
- Area: Guwahati Club
- Nickname: T.C. Girls
- Affiliations: Secondary Education Board of Assam
- Website: www.tcschoolghy.in

Tarini Choudhury Govt. Girls H.S. & M.P. School, also known as Tarini Charan Girls' Higher Secondary School, is a public school located in Guwahati, Assam, India. It is named after educationist Tarini Charan Choudhury.

The school organized its Platinum Jubilee celebration in 2019.

== History ==
The Tarini Charan Girls school was founded in the 1950s and was initially located in the Uzanbazar area of Guwahati. It subsequently shifted to the present site located at the Guwahati club. In December 1963, the Government decided to take over the school, which had previously been government-aided.

The previous principal of the school was Haramohan Dev Goswami. As of 2018, the school has had no principal or vice-principal in post for five years, and twenty-five staff vacancies in total, which has "crippled" the school and pupils' results and the number who are able to take science subjects.

== Notable alumni ==
- Nirupama Borgohain, journalist
- Mamoni Raisom Goswami, activist and writer
