= Adajya =

- Screenshot
- Directed by: Santwana Bardoloi
- Written by: Santwana Bardoloi; Indira Goswami (novel)
- Produced by: Santwana Bardoloi
- Starring: Tom Alter; Trisha Saikia
- Cinematography: Mrinalkanti Das
- Edited by: A. Sreekar Prasad
- Release date: 1996
- Running time: 93 minutes
- Country: India
- Language: Assamese

Adajya (transl. The flight) is a 1996 Indian Assamese language drama film directed by Santwana Bardoloi based on Indira Goswami's 1986 novel Dontal Haatir Uiye Khowa Haoda . The film was screened at several international film festivals.

== Plot ==
The film is set in 1940s Assam. Three widows struggle to lead dignified lives amid the extreme restrictions mandated by law and custom. The arrival of a young American scholar, a poisonous snakebite, and the theft of ancestral jewelry combine to bring the situation of the young and beautiful widow Giribala to a painful crisis.

== Cast ==
- Tom Alter as Mark Sahib
- Trisha Saikia as Giribala
- Bishnu Kharghoria
- Triveni Bora
- Bhagirothi
- Nilu Chakrabarty
- Chetana Das
- Indira Das
- Mintu Barua

== Awards ==
44th National Film Awards

- Best Feature Film in Assamese
- Best Cinematography – Mrinalkanti Das (also for Rag Birag)
- National Film Award – Special Mention – Bhagirothi (also for Dolon Roy for Sanghat)

International Film Festival of India

- Special Jury Award
