= Manmohan Mahapatra =

Indian film director (1951–2020)

- Born: 10 November 1951; Khordha, Odisha, India
- Died: 13 January 2020 (aged 68); Bhubaneswar, Odisha, India
- Occupations: Director, writer, producer
- Awards: 8 National Film Awards Padma Shri

Manmohan Mahapatra (10 November 1951 – 13 January 2020) was an Odia filmmaker, director, producer, and writer. He won eight consecutive national film awards for his films Nishita Swapna, Majhi Pahacha, Klanta Aparanha, Neeraba Jhada, Seeta Raati, and Bhinna Samaya, among others.

His first film Seeta Raati made in 1976 was the first Odia film to be screened at international film festival in 1982.

On 13 January 2020, Mahapatra died in a private hospital in Bhubaneswar at age 68 after battling prolonged kidney and heart ailments .

Manmohan Mahapatra is the recipient of India's highly prestigious award Padma Shri 2020 for his work in the field of art.

== Filmography ==
Mahapatra studied film making at the FTII, Pune, and made a first short film Anti-Memoirs (Anti-Memories) in 1975. He made his first full-fledged Odia film Seeta Raati as a director in 1976. It won him the National Film Award for Best Feature Film in Odia and was screened at international film festival in 1982 — making it the first Odia film to be screened at foreign film festival.

He made couple of short films and then directed Neerab Jhada that won him another National Film Award for Best Feature Film in Odia out of eight consecutive national awards for best feature film in Odia.

He also directed a few Hindi films, notably — Bits and Pieces starring Nandita Das, Rahul Bose, and Dia Mirza.

=== As director ===
- Anti-Memoirs and Anti-Memories (documentary)
- Seeta Raati
- Voices of Silence (documentary)
- Konrak: The Sun Temple (documentary)
- Neeraba Jhada (feature film)
- Klanta Aparahna (feature film)
- Trisandhya(feature film)
- Majhi Pahacha (feature film)
- Nisiddha Swapna (feature film)
- Kichi Smruti Kichu Anubhuti (feature film)
- Andha Diganta (feature film)
- Vinya Samaya (feature film)
- Agni Veena (feature film)
- Muhurta (feature film)

=== As writer ===
- Seeta Raati – Bibhuti Pattnaik
- Neerab Jhada – screenplay
- Klanta Aparahna (Odia) – story
- Tired Afternoon – story
- Majhi Pahacaha
- Forbidden Dream
- Bhinna Samaya
- Muhurta – dialogue – screenplay – story – Barendra Dhal

=== As producer ===
- Forbidden Dream
- Neerab Jhada

== See also ==
- National Film Award for Best Feature Film in Odia
- 29th National Film Awards
- 31st National Film Awards
- 32nd National Film Awards
- 34th National Film Awards
- 35th National Film Awards
- 36th National Film Awards
- 37th National Film Awards
- 40th National Film Awards

== External ==
- My next film explores generation clash: Manmohan Mahaptra
- Klanta Aparanha – Story, Screenplay & Direction: Manmohan Mahapatra – National Film Awards – Best Regional Film – Odia (Silver Lotus)
- Orissa: Manmohan Mahapatra the Father of Oriya New wave Cinema
- MANMOHAN POHAPATRA – Director`s Profile
- Bits 'N' Pieces: Mahapatra's introspective film
