= Kutty Srank =

- Directed by: Shaji N.Karun
- Screenplay by: Harikrishnan; P. F. Mathews
- Story by: Shaji N.Karun
- Produced by: Mahesh Ramanathan, Reliance BIG Entertainment
- Starring: Mammootty; Kamalinee Mukherjee; Padmapriya; Meenakumari; Wahiida; Sai Kumar; Siddique; Suresh Krishna; P. D. Sathish Chandra
- Cinematography: Anjuli Shukla
- Edited by: A. Sreekar Prasad
- Music by: Isaac Thomas Kottukapally
- Distributed by: Reliance BIG Pictures
- Release date: 23 July 2010
- Country: India
- Language: Malayalam

Kutty Srank (English: The Sailor of Hearts) is a 2010 Indian Malayalam arthouse film directed by Shaji N. Karun. Mammootty played the title role for the film and P. D. Sathish Chandra plays the antagonist. The film was produced by Reliance Entertainment under the banner of Big Motion Pictures, their first production in Malayalam. The film was released at the theatres of Kerala on 23 July 2010. The film won the national award for best feature film along with three other awards.

== Plot ==
Kutty Srank (translated as junior boat captain in Malayalam) is a film about a mariner who operates a cargo vessel near the sea port of Kodungalloor, once a roaring port town in Kerala.

One day, the local police station discovers an unidentified body that has washed ashore. A Buddhist nun, Revamma, comes forward to claim that she can identify the rotten body, and she recognises it as that of one kutti Srank. Police enquire her relationship with kutti Srank. Meanwhile, another Latin Christian woman, Pemenna, too claims to recognize the dead man. Both women assure the investigators that the body is that of kutti Srank. Finally a mute woman, Kali, joins them and seeks permission to see the corpse. She, however, rejects the claim made by the other women and argues that the body is not that of kutti Srank. Pemmanna identifies Kali and tells Revamma that Kali is kutti Srank's wife. Eventually each woman share her different acquaintance and relation with kutti Srank.

=== Story ===
Revamma is the first person to come forward and identify a corpse, which has been found on the beach. She explains her connection with Kutty Srank in a flash back sequence. Her father Moopan is the local don in their area near Malabar and is a man literally steeped in blood. Revamma's memories of her early life are related to blood in some way and blood features heavily throughout the first scenes. Adding to all this symbolism, Kutty Srank has an intermittent nose bleed and his nostrils are permanently filled with the smell of blood. Revamma has returned from studying overseas and overthrows Moorpan's great plans for her by announcing that she is going to become a Buddhist. Her father's reaction is fairly predictable but his plans backfire when he uses Kutty Srank to dispose of a Buddhist monk who was with Revamma. Kutty Srank's loyalty to Moopan is unwavering and unquestioning until this betrayal and Revamma takes immediate advantage of Kutty Sranks despair and confusion, using this vulnerability as a way to engineer her escape. Despite the overly heavy blood symbolism this part of the story is fairly logical and the characters react in understandable if rather extreme ways. Mamooty plays the swaggering thug Kutty Srank to perfection, making him violent but with enough shadows and depth to hint at much more to the man. Moopan's rather grandiose living conditions are a nice contrast to the rest of the film and his affectations make him easier to despise. Revamma seems to have been driven insane by her early experiences and her behaviour is very irrational and disturbed. The only normal people here are Revamma's aunt and uncle who seem to be genuinely trying to help her and deal with her father as best as possible. The escape takes Revamma and Kutty Srank close to Cochin where he meets Pemmana, the second woman who turns up to identify the body. It appears that Kutty Srank has worked as a ferryboat captain in Pemmana's village previously, but skipped out under dubious circumstances as is his usual habit. He is great friends with Pemmana's brother, Loni who picks Kutty Srank to play the lead role in their annual Chavittu Nadakam about the Holy Roman Emperor Charlemagne. This traditional drama provides an excuse for some fantastic costumes, singing, dancing and stomping around the stage by the various members of the village. It also allows Mammootty to showcase the more human and fun side to Kutty Srank's character. Although the menace is still there, the interactions between Kutty Srank and Loni give him an opportunity to laugh, joke and drunkenly sing as they roam around the village. The local priest is not happy to hear of the irreligious Kutty Srank taking part in the play and also taking over the affections of Pemmana. Father Yonas has been enlisted by the feckless Joppan to push his match with her and as Joppan seethes with jealousy, Father Yonas whips up fear and mistrust of Kutty Srank. Tensions escalate in the village and there is plenty of scope for betrayal and murder – it rapidly becomes merely a question of who and when. Moopan's henchmen also turn up on the river again in a very groovy speedboat. This, along with the death of his best friend, means that Kutty Srank is ready to skip town again. Avoiding the attentions of Pemmana and escaping a murder hunt are purely side benefits. The third woman who turns up to identify the body is a mute, Kali. She has been living with an older woman who has amazing interpretative skills and understands exactly what Kali is trying to say. She is introduced as Kutty Srank's pregnant wife and sensationally states that the body is not her husband. The final flashback tells her story which starts after Kutty Srank has moved on to Travancore trying once again to elude Moopan's men.

Kutty Srank has taken up with Unnithan who presides over an unhappy family where tragedy has been the normal order for the past 10 years. Unnithan blames this on Kali, a local mute who lives in the forest, and has tried a number of ways to be rid of her. As his trusted man, Kutty Srank heads off in a drunken rage to kill Kali but when he finds her and sees her pitiful existence he is unable to go through with the execution. He ends up being cared for by Kali following a snake bite and eventually becomes her husband. We see a more tender and caring side of Kutty Srank through the eyes of Unnithan's daughter in law Nalini who romanticises the couple in an escape from the misery of her own daily existence. In the end, Kali and Kutty Srank have to make a run for it as Moopan's men have again put in an appearance. The last scene takes place back in the village where the play must go on, and this leads to the final chapter in Kutty Srank's life.

== Narrative structure ==
The film is structurally divided into four different settings, three of which are set in north, mid and south Kerala, respectively. The fourth is a hyper-link set in a police station. The script featured various visual and thematic elements to delineate the three primary sub-plots in both spatial and temporal dimensions, connected through the protagonist. The major devices used for achieving this separation were moods and emotions expressed by the character, (psychological) nature of female protagonists, time-period, geographical locations, religious & social landscapes and seasons. The below table summarizes the different themes associated with each of the women. (Unreported or unverified entries of the table are kept blank.)

Actress	Kamalinee Mukherjee	Padmapriya	Meenakumari
Character name	Pemmena	Revamma	Kali
Geographical location of the story	Kochi	Malabar	Travancore
Season	monsoon	summer	winter
Time period/Era	unspecified	1950	Mid 1950s

== Cast ==
- Mammootty as Kutty Srank
- Kamalinee Mukherjee as Pemenna
- Padmapriya as Revamma
- Meenakumari as Kali
- Wahiida as Nalini
- Suresh Krishna as Loni (Chavittu Nadakam Ashan)
- Sai Kumar as Unnithan
- Siddique as Jonas Achan (Latin Christian priest)
- P. Sreekumar as Paskal
- P. D. Sathish Chandra as Mooppen
- Amit A as Joppan
- Maya Viswanath as Madhavi
- M. B. Padmakumar as Neelan
- Kundara Johny
- Gaurav Moudgill as Prasanna
- M. A. Balachandran as Karan
- Gopalakrishnan as Appunni
- Valsala Menon as Paru
- Nandu as Vishnu

== Crew opinion ==
- Mammootty, who plays the title role of Kutty Srank in the film, said "I am really excited because I will be playing three different characters but not three different roles. It is going to be a challenge for me because the basic nature of all the three characters is the same but there are different behavioural patterns and mannerisms based on what the three women say."
- Kamalinee Mukherjee on her character Pemmena, stated "All my characters have a certain kind of reserve where sexuality is concerned. The character I am playing hails from a village and she's very raw. Since it's a period film, it gave me a chance to look at this other side which I have never really tried to explore before. She's got a strong sexual nature."
- Anjuli Shukla, the director of photography, opined "I am told he (Shaji) chose me because he wanted a woman behind the camera to add that feminine perspective to the theme that revolves around the perspectives of three women. The story is woven around three women and their relationships with the protagonist, Kutti Srank, played by Mammmotty. The instances are set in three different moods and seasons.So each one needs an individualistic treatment; at the same time, it should not stand out from the total cohesive structure of the film."

== Filming ==
The film premiered internationally at Montreal International Film Festival 2009 and nationally at IFFI, Goa 2009. As the film involves change in seasons, environmental and climatic changes, the film was shot in three schedules. The first schedule (depicting the monsoon) was held between 15 June 2008 and 10 July 2008 in the backwaters of Alappuzha. The second schedule of shooting (depicting summer) took place at Chavara and Sasthankotta near Kollam during September 2008. The third and final schedule (depicting winter) took place at Kundapura near Mookambika during December 2008.

== Awards ==
In the 57th National Film Awards, Kutty Srank emerged the biggest winner with five awards, including the one for Best Film. The awards received by the film are

- National Film Award for Best Feature Film: Mahesh Ramanathan, Reliance Big Pictures (producer), Shaji N. Karun (director)
- National Film Award for Best Screenplay (Original): P. F. Mathews & Harikrishna
- National Film Award for Best Cinematography: Anjuli Shukla (camera), Adlabs Films Ltd. (processing laboratory)
- National Film Award for Best Costume Design: Jayakumar
- Special Jury Award (Feature Film): Sreekar Prasad (editing)

Asianet Film Awards

- Best Actor- Mammootty

== Festivals screened ==
- Montreal World Film Festival, 2009
- Busan International Film Festival, 2009
- Mumbai International Film Festival, 2009
- International Film Festival of India, 2009
- Dubai International Film Festival, 2009

== Release ==
The film was released on 23 July 2010 in thirty eight theatres.

== Music ==
Kutty Srank

Soundtrack album by Isaac Thomas Kottukapally
- Released: 1 July 2010
- Genre: Film soundtrack
- Length: 23:31
- Label: Manorama Music
- Producer: Issac Thomas Kottukapally

Isaac Thomas Kottukapally chronology
Veettilekkulla Vazhi (2010)	Kutty Srank (2010)	Koormavatara (2011)

The background score and songs were composed by Isaac Thomas Kottukapally. The soundtrack features 8 songs, including one sung by Mammootty. The lyrics were penned by S. Ramesan Nair.

Kutty Srank (Original Motion Picture Soundtrack)
No.	Title	Lyrics	Singer(s)	Length
1.	"Maga Chandira"	Traditional	Rajalakshmy, Ramesh	3:19
2.	"Aarandum Koorikootti"	Traditional	Mammootty, Basheer	2:03
3.	"Neshamana"	Traditional	Ramesh, Basheer	4:28
4.	"Oru minnaminni"	S. Ramesan Nair	Jassie Gift, Devanand, Pradeep Palluruthy	3:48
5.	"Thankameyoli"	Traditional	Rajalakshmi, Ramesh	3:00
6.	"Ivalarivalar"	Traditional	Ramesh	2:04
7.	"Kattiyakkaran"	Traditional	Basheer	1:28
8.	"Rajadampathimar"	Traditional	Ramesh	3:18
Total length:				23:31
