= Mrinal Kanti Das (cinematographer) =

Cinematographer from Assam

- Born: 31 October 1965
- Died: 3 September 2004 (aged 39)
- Education: FTII

Mrinal Kanti Das was an Indian cinematographer who predominantly worked in Assamese-language films. For his work on the Assamese films Adajya and Rag Birag, he was awarded the National Film Award for Best Cinematography in 1996. He was the first cinematographer from Assam to receive the national award for cinematography.

Notably, Adajya and Rag Birag were among the first Assamese-language films to win the National Film Award for Best Cinematography. Mrinal served as cinematographer on at least 13 movies, apart from television productions. Six of the movies photographed by him (Adajya, Rag Birag, Hastir Kanya, Koihatir Dhuliya, Baibhob, and Panoi Jonky) have received eight national awards and two international awards. Hiya Diya Niya, another movie, is considered a highly popular and financially successful film in Assamese history.

Mrinal was on the film jury that evaluated feature films for awards at the 50th National Film Awards in 2002.

== Early life ==
After completing his schooling in Guwahati in the early 1980s, Mrinal was selected for civil engineering at the government-run Jorhat Engineering College, Assam. However, he quit midway to join the State Forest Service at a young age. He had a passion for photography, shuttlecock, rock climbing, trekking, and mountaineering. In 1986, Mrinal became the first Indian to reach the summit of Menthosa, a peak in the Western Himalayas standing at an elevation of about 6,443 meters.

The death of promising filmmaker and film activist Manjyoti Baruah, his friend since school, in a tram accident in 1986 was a turning point in Mrinal's life. To fulfill his friend's filmmaking dream, he enrolled at the Film and Television Institute of India (FTII), Pune, in 1988, initially on leave from the Forest Service.

== Career ==
After graduating from FTII, Mrinal assisted cinematographer Binod Pradhan. Mrinal became widely known as an independent cinematographer after his work on Mimangsha in 1994, one or two years after graduating from the institute. In 1996–1997, he got his major break. During these years, he worked on three films – Adajya, Rag Birag, and Hastir Kanya – which together received five national awards. He directed and videographed Rudaali (1994), a 13-episode teleserial, in addition to documentaries for Doordarshan. His debut as a feature film director, Aranyanat Borukhun, was about 10% complete as of September 2004.

== Death ==
Mrinal Kanti Das died from injuries sustained in a road accident on a highway in Jorhat, Assam, in September 2004. He is survived by his wife, Rubee Das. The Mrinal Das Foundation, an organization established by her in collaboration with friends and well-wishers, organizes film appreciation courses and other activities to promote meaningful cinema.

== Filmography ==
As cinematographer

- FTII experimental film directed by Harmuz – won a national award in the short film section
- Unmekhon (1992) – unreleased
- Deuta (TV show)
- Xoisor Pothar Manuh (6-episode TV series)
- Mimangsha (1994)
- Adajya (1996)
- Rag Birag (1996)
- Hastir Kanya (1997)
- Hothat Brishti (1998)
- Baibhob (1999)
- Koihatir Dhuliya (1999)
- Hiya Diya Niya (2000)
- Asene Konoba Hiyat (2000)
- Anyo Ek Jatra (2001)
- Daag (2001)
- Nayak (2001)
- Mon (2002)
- Panoi Jonky (Panei Jonki) - in Mising language (2002)
- Gun Gun Gane Gane
- Anurag (2004)
- Sneha Bandhan (2006)
- Sapon
- Nishiddha Nodi
- Noi Poriya Collage

As director

- Rudaali (1994) - 13-episode TV series
- Spandan (documentary on Assam's Jaipore Rain Forest)
- Aranyanat Borukhun (2004) - 10% complete
