= Bambai Raat Ki Bahon Mein =

- Directed by: Khwaja Ahmad Abbas
- Story by: Khwaja Ahmad Abbas
- Produced by: Khwaja Ahmad Abbas
- Starring: Vimal Ahuja; Surekha; Madhavi; Persis Khambatta; David Abraham; Jalal Agha
- Cinematography: Ramachandra
- Edited by: Mohan Rathod
- Music by: J. P. Kaushik; Hasan Kamal (lyricist)
- Production company: Naya Sansar
- Release date: 1967
- Running time: 136 minutes
- Country: India
- Language: Hindi

Bambai Raat Ki Bahon Mein (transl. In the Arms of the Bombay Night) is a 1967 suspense crime-thriller Hindi film written, produced and directed by Khwaja Ahmad Abbas. The film starred Vimal Ahuja, Surekha, David, Irshad Panjatan, A. K. Hangal, Madhukar, Kuljit Pal and debutantes Jalal Agha and Persis Khambatta in major roles.

At the 1967 National Film Awards it won the National Film Award for Best Cinematography for Ramachandra.

== Cast ==
- Vimal Ahuja as Amar Kumar
- Surekha as Asha
- Madhavi as Rosy
- David Abraham as Barrister Rameshchand
- Persis Khambatta as Lily / Leela
- Prakash as Tikam / Toto
- Yunus Parvez as Chaiwala
- Akhtar Siraj
- Jalal Agha as Johnny / Joseph
- A.K. Hangal as Sonadas Doleria
- Prithviraj Kapoor as Himself
- Irshad Panjatan as Sevakram

== Soundtrack ==
The film has music by J.P. Kaushik and lyrics by Hasan Kamal.

- "Bambai Raat Ki Bahon Mein" - Asha Bhosle
- "Jalti Hui Jawanian Yeh Unkahi Kahaniyan" - Mahendra Kapoor
- "Usne Jo Kaha Mujse Ek Geet Suna Do Na" - Sulakshana Pandit
