= Ram Chandra (cinematographer) =

Indian cinematographer

- Occupation: Cinematographer

Ram Chandra (Ramchandra) was an Indian cinematographer who worked primarily in Hindi cinema. He won the National Film Award for Best Cinematography on two occasions: for Bambai Raat Ki Bahon Mein (1967) and Reshma Aur Shera (1971). He was a member of the Western India Cinematographers Association (WICA).

Besides winning the National Film Award for Best Cinematography, Reshma Aur Shera won two other National Awards and was nominated for the Golden Bear at the Berlin International Film Festival. It was also selected as the Indian entry for the Best Foreign Language Film at the 44th Academy Awards but was not accepted as a nominee.

Ram Chandra worked with Khwaja Ahmad Abbas, considered a pioneer of Indian neo-realistic cinema, as well as with Sunil Dutt, known for his significant contributions to Indian cinema, especially as an actor.
