= Reshma Aur Shera =

- Original poster
- Directed by: Sunil Dutt
- Written by: S. Ali Raza
- Produced by: Sunil Dutt
- Starring: Waheeda Rehman; Sunil Dutt; Amitabh Bachchan; Raakhee; Vinod Khanna
- Cinematography: Ramachandra
- Edited by: Pran Mehra
- Music by: Jaidev
- Production company: Ajanta Arts
- Release date: 23 July 1971
- Running time: 158 minutes
- Country: India
- Language: Hindi

Reshma Aur Shera (lit. Reshma and Shera) is a 1971 Hindi crime drama film produced and directed by Sunil Dutt and starring Waheeda Rehman as Reshma and Sunil Dutt as Shera. It also stars Vinod Khanna, Amitabh Bachchan, Raakhee, Ranjeet, K.N. Singh, Jayant and Amrish Puri in supporting roles. Sunil Dutt's son Sanjay Dutt, who was 12 years at the time, appears briefly as a Qawwali singer in his first film appearance.

Reshma Aur Shera received high critical acclaim from domestic and international critics and Sunil Dutt was nominated for the Golden Bear at the Berlin International Film Festival. It was selected as the Indian entry for the Best Foreign Language Film at the 44th Academy Awards, but was not accepted as a nominee.

Reshma Aur Shera won 3 awards at the 19th National Film Awards. Waheeda Rehman won the National Film Award for Best Actress for her highly-acclaimed performance in the film. The film also won the National Film Award for Best Music Direction for Jaidev and the National Film Award for Best Cinematography for Ramachandra.

== Synopsis ==
Set against the backdrop of Rajasthan, Reshma (Rehman) and Shera (Dutt) love each other in the midst of a violent feud between their clans. When their families find out about their relationship, Chotu (Bachchan), Shera's mute sharpshooting brother carries out his father Sagat Singh's (Jayant) orders to kill Reshma's father (K. N. Singh) and her recently married brother Gopal (Ranjeet). Unable to bear the grief of Gopal's widowed bride (Raakhee), Shera kills his own father believing he actually pulled the trigger. After this tragedy, Reshma and Shera's family's feud will end in more tragedy as misunderstandings lead to more bloodshed between the clans.

Shera swears to kill Chotu and protect Reshma's family. Shera searches for Chotu, who hides in Reshma's house and seeks protection from her. The movie's climax is when Shera waits outside Reshma's house to kill Chotu. At the moment, Chotu and Reshma emerge from the house as a married couple. Shera notices sindoor on Reshma's forehead and realizes that he cannot kill Chotu since he is now her husband, thus ending the bloodshed. In his grief, Shera ends his own life using his rifle, just as Reshma to collapses after begging the skies to take her life away, with her corpse falling on that of Shera’s. As the two lovers lay dead in the desert, a windstorm takes place, and buries their bodies within the sand.

== Cast ==
- Waheeda Rehman as Reshma
- Sunil Dutt as Shera
- Amitabh Bachchan as Chhotu
- Vinod Khanna as Vijay
- Raakhee as Reshma's Sister-in-law
- Ranjeet as Gopal
- Jayant as Sagat Singh
- K. N. Singh as Chaudhary
- Amrish Puri as Rehmat Khan
- Sanjay Dutt as Qawwali Singer
- Naval Kumar as Jagat Singh

== Production ==
The film was originally directed by S. Sukhdev, a well-known documentary filmmaker who had previously made the feature film My Love (1970). But, Sunil Dutt decided to reshoot the entire film with himself as the director.

A widely circulated claim related to the film is that Sunil Dutt had initially dismissed casting Amitabh Bachchan because he hated his baritone voice. Subhash K. Jha later clarified that Dutt was seeking a second lead to play a mute character and told Bachchan that the role was not suitable for him because of his impressive voice. However, Bachchan was keen to take on the role, and Dutt remarked, "What a performance he gave without speaking a word!". He also explained that such claims had created a misunderstanding between Dutt and Bachchan in the media.

== Music ==
| Song | Singer | Order (Screenplay) | Raga |
|---|---|---|---|
| "Tu Chanda Main Chandni" | Lata Mangeshkar | 3 | Mand (singing style) |
| "Tauba Tauba Meri Tauba" | Asha Bhosle | 5 | |
| "Jab Se Lagan Lagaayi Re" | Asha Bhosle | 4 | |
| "Zaalim Meri Sharaab" | Manna Dey | 1 | |
| "Nafrat Ki Ek Hi Thokar" | Manna Dey | 6 | |
| "Ek Meethi Si Chubhan" | Lata Mangeshkar | 2 | |

== Awards ==
Won

- Best Actress - Waheeda Rehman
- Best Music Direction - Jaidev
- Best Cinematography - Ramachandra

Nomination

- Golden Bear - Sunil Dutt (as director)

== Reception ==
Despite receiving positive reviews from critics, the film was a big commercial failure at the box office which lead to a financial loss for Sunil Dutt. He had to sell seven of his cars and started travelling by bus. However, over the years, the film has been praised for its exquisite story of love in war time and considered as a lesser gems in Indian cinema. Triya Gulati of ThePrint described the film as an "Indian Romeo and Juliet" and praised its poetic pacing, emotional subtlety and visual boldness, which she felt made it "timeless".

== See also ==
- List of submissions to the 44th Academy Awards for Best Foreign Language Film
- List of Indian submissions for the Academy Award for Best Foreign Language Film
