= Kulada Kumar Bhattacharya =

Indian radio artist (1933–2024)

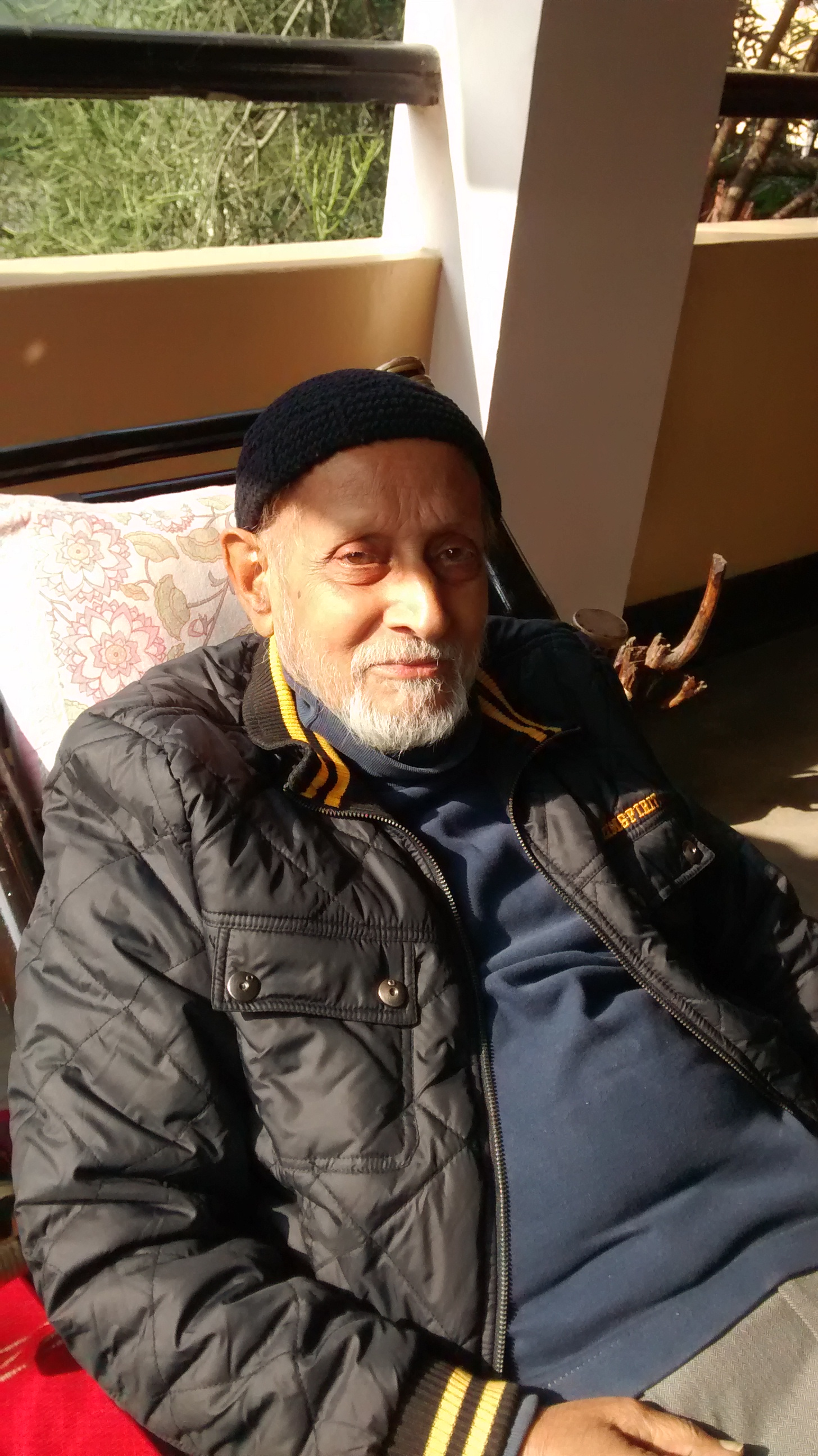
- Bhattacharya in 2015
- Born: 18 August 1933; Panbazar, Guwahati, Assam Province, British India
- Died: 1 November 2024 (aged 91); Ganeshguri, Guwahati, Assam, India
- Occupation: Artist
- Notable work: Shakuntala, Lotighati, Chikmik Bijuli, Village Rockstars and so on
- Parent(s): Kaliprasad Bhattacharya, Kamala Devi
- Awards: Prag Cine Award, Apsara Award, Nirod Chowdhury Lifetime Achievement Award, etc.

Kulada Kumar Bhattacharjee (18 August 1933 – 1 November 2024) was an Indian radio artist, actor and director from Assam. He became famous for his role in the radio play 'Parashuram' which was broadcast from Guwahati Radio. He was one of the most professionally trained artists who underwent training in London in the areas of stage performance, film and television. He founded the Assam National Theater in the mid-1960s. He was a veteran actor in the theatres of Assam. He was fluent in Assamese, Bengali and Hindi. Because of his stays in London, he could speak fluent British English too. He was also a noted reciter. Bhattacharya was the founding Director of Dr. Bhupen Hazarika Regional Government Film and Television Institute (Jyoti Chitraban). He was twice selected as a jury member for the National Film Competition and Indian Panorama. In 2018, he was awarded the 'North East Lifetime Achievement' Award by the Prag Cine Awards. Kulada Kumar Bhattacharya was also a prose writer. He has written articles on cinema and sports in newspapers, magazines and has translated several books into Assamese.

== Early life and education ==
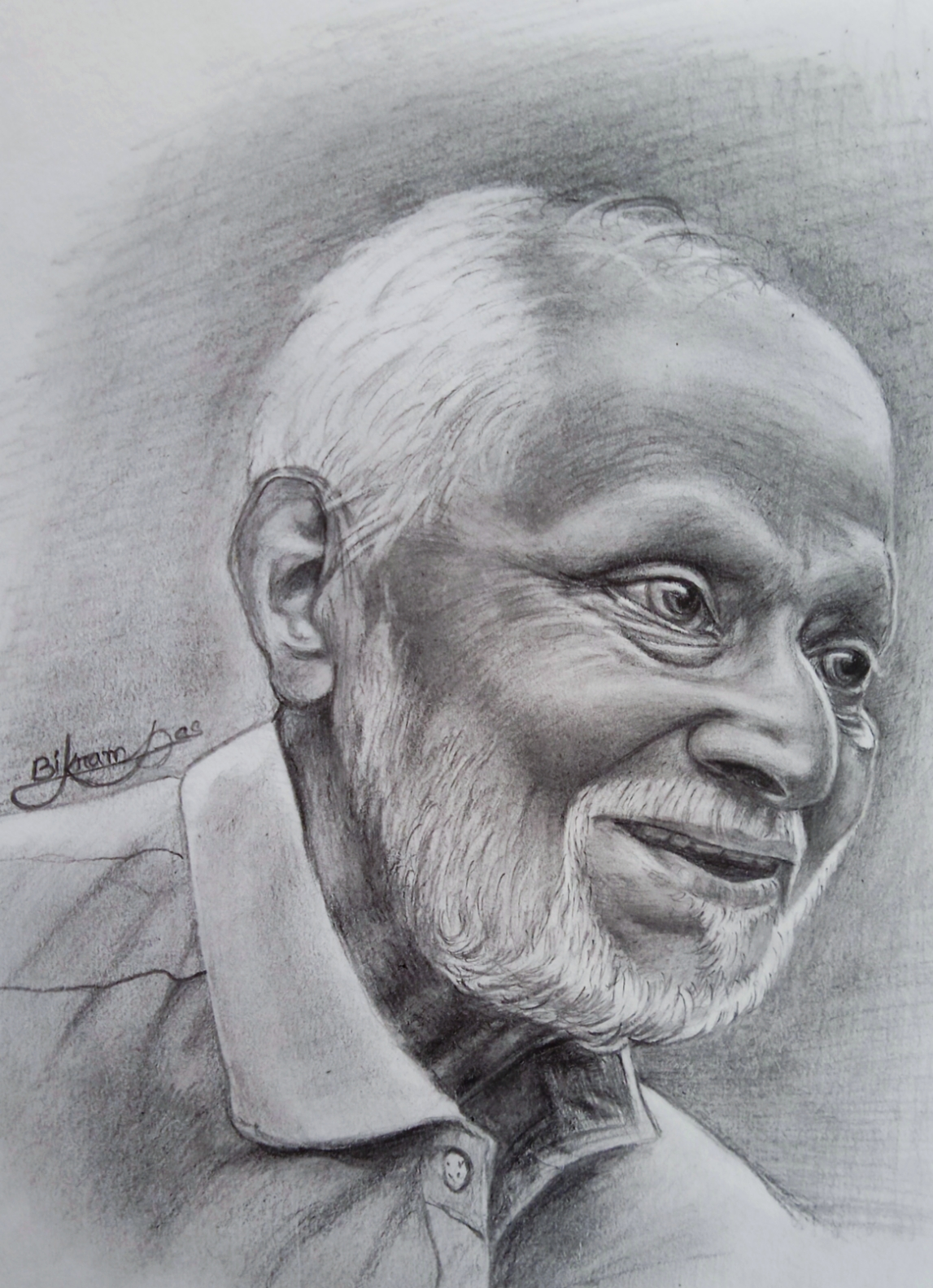
A portrait of Kulada Kumar Bhattacharya by Artist Bikram Das

Kulda Kumar Bhattacharya was born on 18 August 1933 to Kaliprasanna Bhattacharya, an advocate from Jaswant Road, Panbazar. His mother was Kamala Devi. His parents were both born in Srihatta district. Sylhet was then part of Assam. Bhattacharya was the third child of his parents. He had two brothers and two sisters by birth.

He passed his matriculation examination in 1946 and his BA from Cotton College. He received his master's degree in history from the University of Guwahati. He studied theatre, acting and television in London and Germany.

== Career ==
Bhattacharya entered the stage at the age of six due to his passion for drama and recitation. While in college, he became involved with the Gananatya Sangha of India under the leadership of Hemang Biswas. While studying at the University of Guwahati, Bhattacharya was also busy doing plays for ITPA and All India Radio. Kulada Kumar Bhattacharya decided to pursue a professional education in theater on the advice of his father. In 1960, he graduated from the New Era Academy of Drama and Music in London with a six-year diploma in acting and stage art and completed three weeks of training in production design from the British Drama League. During that period, he worked as a salesman in a book shop. Then he got the opportunity to work in the Bengali branch of the BBC. While working at the BBC, he applied for an announcer position on Indian television but failed. Unable to return to work, he decided to take a course in television and went to Hamburg, Germany in 1960, where he studied television direction and vision mixing at the Nordlund Westdeutsche Rundfunk and Fernsehen. He returned to India and worked with an English theater group in Delhi. During this time, he worked with Habib Tanvir and Sushma Seth. A friend in London introduced Bhattacharya to the Assistant Station Director of Aakashbani, where he got a job of recording Bengali programs broadcast from the United States.

Kulada Kumar Bhattacharya returned to Assam in 1962 and took over as Executive Producer (Drama) of All India Radio. As Executive Producer of Aakashbani, he initiated the radio broadcast of several famous plays including Shakespeare's Hamlet.

Kulada Kumar Bhattacharya’s autobiography, titled Dhou Phali Dinga Aguyay, was published by Bandhav, Assam in November 2024

== Death ==
Bhattacharya died from pneumonia and heart problems on 1 November 2024, at the age of 91. He had been undergoing treatment at Dispur Hospital in Ganeshguri, Guwahati since 24 October 2024. He died at the hospital on 1 November at 8-20 pm due to old age. Before his death, he donated his body to the Ellora Vigyan Mancha.

== Filmography ==
Year	Films	Directors	Recognition
1961	Shakuntala	Bhupen Hazarika	9th National Film Awards
1966	Latighati	Bhupen Hazarika	12th National Film Awards
1969	Chikmik Bijulee	Bhupen Hazarika	
1992	Prabhati Pakhir Gaan		
2011	Ramdhenu	Munin Baruah	
2013	Surjasta	Prodyut Kumar Deka	Nominated for Filmfare
2016	Dikchow Banat Palaax	Sanjeev Savapandit	Nargis Dutta Award in 64th National Film Award
2016	Cacus	Arup Manna	
2017	Majrati Keteki	Santwana Bordoloi	Special Mention-National Film Award(Adil Hussain)
2017	Village Rockstars	Reema Das	Nominated for Oscar
2021	Khonoswor	Saurav Baishya	
2022	Hati Bandhu (Doc)	Kripal Kalit	69th National Film Award for Best Voice Over

=== Television ===
Bhattacharya also acted in several television serials. He directed the series Tejal Ghora starring Ishan Baroua, Santwana Bardoloi, Mintu Baroua and Nikumani Baroua. The 1994 film '"Tejal Ghora" is one of the best Assamese serials to date. In addition to "Tejal Ghora", he also starred in and directed the teleserials.

- Deuta
- Jeevanar Batat
- Papu Niku Sangbad
- Ei Sohorote
- Trikal (1995)
- Damini
- Gateway (made in Hindi language)

=== Documentary ===
Bhattacharya made more than 35 documentaries and short films. Some of them are:

- ‘Delightful Nature’ (1972),
- ‘Pride of Nature’ (1972),
- ‘Mopin’ (1973)
- ‘Elephant Befriended’ (1974)
- ‘Men Behind Metal’ (1975)
- ‘Danger Ahead’ (1976)

=== Drama ===
Kulada Kumar Bhattacharya founded 'Axom Jatiya Natyaxala' in 1960, an workshop-styled platform for the betterment of local theatre art and artistry. He also started a revolution in radio and theatrical plays along with famous playwrights like Dr. Bhabendra Nath Saikia, Arun Sharma, Mahendra Barthakur etc. He became known as Amal in his childhood playing the character of Amal in Kabiguru's play 'Dakghar'. While in Delhi, he gained popularity by acting in several plays at the encouragement of Shailendra Shankar, Assistant Station Director for External Affairs.

==== With Gananatya Sangha of India ====
- Notun Ihudi (New Jew) (by Salil Sen)
- Moshal (Torch) (by Dwigendra Chandra Bandyopadhyay)
- Raktakarbi (by Rabindranath Tagore)

==== For theatre ====
- Maatir Gari (Clay carts) (Shudrakar, 1983)
- Soraguri Chapari
- Parashuram, Baghjali[6] (Arun Sharma, 1988)
- Othello (Shakespeare, 2005)

=== Books ===
- Dhou Phali Dinga Aguyay(Autobiography)

== Awards and accolades ==
- Tarun Duwara Memorial Oil India Award
- Nirod Chowdhury Lifetime Achievement Award
- Recognition from Jeevan Ram Mungi Devi Goenka Charitable Trust
- Apsara Award
- 2016 'Life in a Theater Award' at Gplus Theater Festival.
- In 2018, he was awarded the North East Lifetime Achievement Award at the Prag Cine Awards.
- In 2023, he won the 69th National Film Award for his voiceover in English Language in the film Hatibandhu. (Documentary: Hatibandhu, Director: Kripal Kalita, English Screenplay: Kulda Kumar Bhattacharya, Assamese Screenplay: Nayan Prasad)
