= Santwana Bordoloi =

Indian director, actress, radio host and paediatrician

- Born: 1949 or 1950 (age 76–77); Guwahati, Assam, India
- Organization: iBeats Private Limited.

Santwana Bordoloi is an Indian director, actress, radio host and pediatrician from Assam. Her directorial ventures, Adajya (The Flight, 1996) and Maj Rati Keteki (2017), both won the National Film Award for Best Assamese Feature Film, despite being released two decades apart. She also won the IFFI Special Jury Award and Special Mention for Adajya. Bordoloi started her career as an actress, featuring in the popular TV series Tejaal Ghora, directed by Kulada Kumar Bhattacharyya.

== Career ==
Santwana Bordoloi is a pediatrician who works at Dispur Hospital. In 1996, she made her directorial debut with Adajya. The film is based on Indira Goswami’s novel, Dontal Haatir Uiye Khowa Haoda (The Moth Eaten Howdah of a Tusker), and it won the National Award for Best Feature Film in Assamese, and also was showcased at various international film festivals. She completed the film in about a month while managing her medical practice.

The two-decade gap in her films gave her critics the space to call her a "one-film wonder". However, she came out with Maj Rati Keteki in 2017, which also won the award for Best Assamese Feature Film at the 2017 National Awards. Film star Adil Hussain won Nargis Dutta Award – Special Mention (feature film) at 64th National Film Awards for acting in this film.

== Awards and honors ==
- FIPRESCI Award (2005)
- FIPRESCI Award (1996)
- Kodak Vision Award
- Padma Shri Award (2003)
- Kamal Kumari National Award (on Culture, 2004)
- Bhupen Hazarika Award (2012)
- Padma Bhushan (2015)
