= The Man from Chinnamasta =

2005 novel by Indira Goswami

The Man From Chinnamasta
- First English edition cover, painting by Tyeb Mehta
- Author: Indira Goswami
- Original title: 'Chinnamastar Manuhtu'
- Translator: Prashanta Goswami
- Language: English
- Genre: Assamese Literature
- Publisher: Katha Books
- Publication place: India
- Media type: Print (Paperback
- Pages: 200
- ISBN: 81-89020-38-2
- LC Class: MLCS 2006/01346 (P) PK1569.G578

The Man from Chinnamasta is a novel published in 2005 and written by Indira Goswami, who was awarded the Sahitya Akademi Award in 1983, the Jnanpith Award in 2001 and the Prince Claus Awards in 2008. Set in pre-independence British Assam, it was written with a specific political vision : to exhort her readers to protest against the practice of animal sacrifice in the ancient Kamakhya Temple in Assam. Once published, it took Assam by storm because of its subversive nature. The Brahmins especially took offence for her frank demand to remove an ancient practice in the most important Shakti temple of the world.

== Plot ==
The novel follows the relationship of Dorothy Brown, a British woman in Assam, and her relationship with a tantric of the Kamakhya Temple in Assam. Ratnadhar and Bidhibala's -the child widow's- story runs parallel to this narrative. Ratnadhar organizes a signature campaign against the practice and faces many troubles in the process.

== Significance ==
The novel is also a scholarly account of Indira Goswami's quest and hard work. The Man from Chinnamasta, the tantric who is the protagonist, constantly discusses the ancient Sanskrit scriptures and substantiates his demand to stop animal sacrifice. He demonstrates the various alternatives that Debi Bhagavat, Yogini Tantra and Kalika Purana furnish to animal sacrifice.

== See also ==
- Assamese literature
- Pages Stained With Blood
