= Pages Stained with Blood =

1984 novel by Indira Goswami

Pages Stained With Blood
- First edition cover
- Author: Indira Goswami
- Translator: Pradip Acharya
- Cover artist: Geeta Dharmarajan
- Language: English
- Genre: Assamese Literature
- Publisher: Katha Books
- Publication place: India
- Media type: Print (Hardcover),
- Pages: 337
- ISBN: 81-87649-11-9
- LC Class: MLCS 2003/00915 PK1569.G578

Pages Stained With Blood (2001) originally published as Tej Aru Dhulire Dhushorito Prishtha is an Assamese novel by Indira Goswami that depicts the gory Sikh pogrom in Delhi as an aftermath of the assassination of the Indian Prime Minister Indira Gandhi in June 1984. First published in Assamese in Goriyoshi literary journal in episodic form, it generated controversy in conservative Assam due to the love story between a professor and a riksha puller.

It is pieced together from first person accounts of victims, newspaper reports and the unnamed female protagonist's relationship with the various men in her life during the early eighties of Delhi, India.

== Plot summary ==
The story follows a young Assamese woman who teaches at the University of Delhi and is an author. She is busy writing a book on Delhi and regularly jots down anything that crosses her mind. The Operation Blue Star at the Golden Temple in Amritsar brings sudden twist to the novel and the protagonist plunges headlong into the crisis for most of the people she is close to are Sikhs. At last, her book is drenched in Santokh Singh's blood and she loses all her recorded material.

== Major symbolisms ==
Thin Line Between Fact and Fiction It is a novel with the character of a memoirs, and often the protagonist is identified as Indira Goswami. In several interviews she stresses that there is no difference between fact and fiction in that book.

Sexuality For the conservative Assamese society, it created a stir due to the frank confession of sexual attraction the first-person narrator feels to Santokh Singh, the rickshaw puller, with whom she visits the riot-affected areas such as Jahangirpuri, Shakti Nagar.

Delhi The City of Delhi is the most important character in the novel. Though the backdrop is of immense political and social crisis, the author attempts to complete her book by visiting various places such as Mirza Ghalib's house, the prostitutes of GB Road – the famous red light area of Delhi. Her preoccupation is often the remnants of Mughal Delhi and the Delhi of the dispossessed.

Blood Blood is the most importance metaphor and presence in the novel. The hair-raising accounts of the riot-affected areas and that the writer's notes are at last drenched one night as a result of which she is unable to complete her book on Delhi brings the horror of the riot very close, almost to the interiors.

== Legacy ==
It is used as a textbook in several universities in India. The current critical discourse surrounding the novel is often laudatory. The new generation of writers and intellectuals celebrate this novel as a classic in Assamese literature.

== See also ==
- Assamese literature
- The Man from Chinnamasta
- Delhi
- 1984 anti-Sikh riots
- Indira Gandhi assassination
- Operation Blue Star
