= M. K. Raghavendra =

Indian film critic (b. 1954)

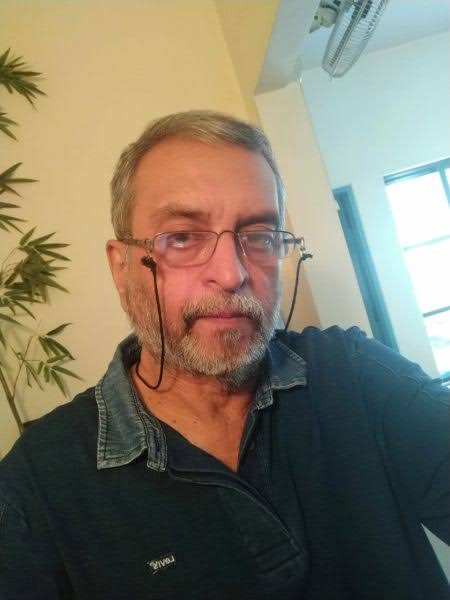
- Born: 24 December 1954 (age 71); Bangalore
- Occupation: Film critic

M. K. Raghavendra (born 24 December 1954) is an Indian film and literary scholar, critic, and writer. He has written eleven books on cinema, literature, and politics and contributed to major publications like The Hindu and The Indian Express. He received the National Award for Best Film Critic in 1997 and the Homi Bhabha Fellowship in 2000. His book Seduced by the Familiar (2008) is highly regarded in the field. Raghavendra has lectured at top Indian universities and served on international film juries. He is also the Founder-Editor of Phalanx, an online journal for debates in the humanities and social sciences.

== Early writing ==
Raghavendra, who has a master's degree in science and worked for over two decades in the financial sector, first attracted attention as a film critic when he became co-founder of the film journal Deep Focus, the other co-founders being AL Georgekutty, MU Jayadev and Babu Subramanian, who all wrote their first critical pieces on cinema for the journal around 1987–88. With AL Georgekutty as editor, Deep Focus was launched in December 1987 and made an immediate impact for the seriousness of its approach. The journal began as a quarterly but became irregular thereafter, sometimes coming out with only a single issue in an entire year. But Raghavendra was especially prolific in Deep Focus with his essays and reviews. Some of his major essays for Deep Focus were: ‘Urbanisation and Rootlessness: Adoor’s Drifters in Perspective’, ‘The Lost World of Andrei Tarkovsky’ ,‘RW Fassbinder: Notes on the Cinema of an Actor-Director’ ,‘Time and the Popular Film’ ,‘Generic Elements and the Conglomerate Narrative’ ,‘The Sins of a Pioneer: Satyajit Ray Re-examined’ , ‘The River as History: Ritwik Ghatak's Titash Ekti Nadir Naam' , and ‘The Dilemmas of Third World Cinema’. Part of this writing played a role in fetching him the National Award in 1997.

With Deep Focus becoming irregular, Raghavendra contributed a series of book reviews to the (now defunct) Indian Review of Books, published from Madras (now Chennai). Apart from reviewing books on film and media, he also took to reviewing fiction. Some of the writers he reviewed or wrote essays about were: Raja Rao, Salman Rushdie, Gabriel García Márquez, Shobha De, Kiran Nagarkar, Vikram Seth, K V Puttappa, U R Ananthamurthy, SL Bhyrappa, Shivarama Karanth and Donald Richie (on Akira Kurosawa). Other subjects on which he wrote in the Indian Review of Books in the 1990s included American noir and science fiction. Since then he has also contributed book reviews to The Book Review, Caravan, The Hindu, Biblio: A Review of Books, Indian Economic & Social History Review and Economic and Political Weekly.

== Theorizing on popular cinema ==
Based on the work he had already done as a writer/ critic, Raghavendra was selected for a Homi Bhabha Fellowship in 1999, with the two-year scholarship to commence from January 2000. The subject chosen for his research was ‘Globalization and its effect on Indian popular film narrative.’ He completed his research in 2001 as scheduled but it took him several years to complete his first book on cinema. Seduced by the Familiar: Narration and Meaning in Indian Popular Cinema was published by Oxford University Press in 2008 and partly developed on two essays written in Deep Focus. Seduced by the Familiar represents Raghavendra's first extended effort to understand popular cinema in a new way – i.e. neither as the output of authorial presences in the shape of directors nor as symptoms of psychological/social processes (psychoanalysis/ cultural studies) but rather as bodies of texts co-authored by a public to deal with socio-political concerns of their own. In film academics it departed from the work of scholars like M Madhava Prasad by putting the theory-down approach aside and concentrating empirically on the formal/ narrative strategies used by the mainstream Hindi film to sustain the nation as an ‘imagined community’ (in Benedict Anderson's terms). Seduced by the Familiar, which eschews the usual jargon associated with academic writing on cinema and tries to be lucid, and is also important for two other things – an elaborate introduction charting the trajectory of scholarship on the mainstream Hindi film and a first chapter dealing with ‘narrative convention and form’. \

== Popular criticism ==
The work hitherto described is academic criticism but Raghavendra has also written articles/criticism for the lay reader in newspapers and periodicals like Deccan Herald, The Hindu, Caravan, Frontline, The Indian Express, Pioneer, Times of India and online publications like The Wire, Firstpost and Dearcinema. His first book of popular criticism was published by Collins in 2009–50 Indian Film Classics, which had individual essays dealing with a whole range of films from Franz Osten's Light of Asia a.k.a. Prem Sanyas (1925) to Rakeysh Omprakash Mehra's Rang De Basanti (2006). The collection of essays includes fiction features in a multitude of languages and genres, with examples as different as Salaam Bombay (Mira Nair, 1988), Samskara (Pattabhirama Reddy, 1970), Imagi Ningthem (Aribam Syam Sharma, 1981) and Amar Akbar Anthony (Manmohan Desai, 1977). Instead of adopting a uniform method, the essays examine each film from its most interesting side – e.g.: Kamal Amrohi's Pakeezah for its baroque aesthetic, Adoor Gopalakrishnan's Mukhamukham for its authorial perspective, and K. Viswanath's Telugu dance-musical Sankarabharanam for its ideological aspects.

Raghavendra followed up 50 Indian Film Classics with a companion piece also from Collins. In Director's Cut: 50 Film-makers of the Modern Era (2013) he examines the work of film directors from across the world, but restricting his attention to those who produced notable work after 1960. The sixties were the years in which the French New Wave came of age and Raghavendra argues that the decade broadly marks the arrival of the ‘modern’ in cinema.

== Distinctions ==
When Raghavendra received the National Award in 1997 the citation read as follows: “For his provocative and iconoclastic writing, which inspires debate and discussion, so rare in film criticism today.”

== Books written or edited ==
- 50 Indian Film Classics
- Seduced by the Familiar: Narration and Meaning in Indian Popular Cinema
- Bipolar Identity: Region, Nation and the Kannada Language Film
- The Politics of Hindi Cinema in the New Millennium: Bollywood and the Anglophone Indian Nation
- Director's Cut: 50 Major Film – Makers of the Modern Era
- Bollywood (Oxford India Short Introductions Series)
- Satyajit Ray (Harper 21)

== Other academic writing (list incomplete) ==
- Convention and Form in Indian Popular Cinema, from K Gopinathan (ed.) Film and philosophy, Calicut: University of Calicut, 2003.
- The entry for ‘Bollywood’ in Vinay Lal, Ashis Nandy (eds.) The Future of Knowledge and Culture: A Dictionary for the 21st Century, Penguin Viking, 2005.
- Structure and Form in Indian Popular Film Narrative from Vinay Lal, Ashis Nandy (eds.) Fingerprinting Popular Culture: The Mythic and the Iconic in Indian Cinema, New Delhi: Oxford University Press, 2007.
- Local Resistance to Global Bangalore: Reading Minority Indian Cinema, from K Moti Gokulsing, Wimal Dissanayake (eds.) Popular Culture in a Globalised India, London: Routledge, 2009.
- Beyond ‘Bollywood’: Interpreting Indian Regional Cinema, from Sowmya Dechamma CC, Elavarthy Sathya Prakash (eds.) Cinemas of South India: Culture, Resistance, Ideology, New Delhi: Oxford University Press, 2010.
- Region, Language and Indian Cinema: Mysore and Kannada Language Cinema of the 1950s, from Anjali Gera Roy and Chua Beng Huat (eds.) Travels of Bollywood Cinema: From Bombay to LA, New Delhi: Oxford University Press, 2012.
- Naxalism in Cinema: The Absent Community, from Pradip Basu (ed.) Red on Silver: Naxalites in Cinema, Kolkata: Setu Prakashani, 2012.
- Mainstream Hindi Cinema and Brand Bollywood: The Transformation of a Cultural Artifact, from Anjali Gera Roy (ed.) The Magic of Bollywood: At Home and Abroad, New Delhi: Sage, 2012.
- The Reinterpretation of Historical Trauma: Three Films about Partition, from Sukalpa Bhattacharjee, C Joshua Thomas (eds.) Society, Representation and Textuality: The Critical Interface, New Delhi: Sage, 2013.
- Kannada Cinema and Princely Mysore, from K Moti Gokulsing, Wimal Dissanayake (eds.) Routledge Handbook of Indian Cinemas, London: Routledge, 2013.

== Membership of Juries ==
- Member of the jury for the Indian Panorama 1998 by Government of India. Jury headed by M.T.Vasudevan Nair, as chairman.
- Member of jury for Indian Panorama 2004 – documentary and non-feature films. Chairman: Mike Pandey.
- Member of FIPRESCI Jury at Thessaloniki International Film Festival, November 2007.
- Member of FIPRESCI Jury at Zanzibar International Film Festival, July 2008.
- Member of National Critic's Jury at Mumbai International Film Festival (MIFF) 2008.
- Member of FIPRESCI Jury Leipzig International Film Festival for Documentaries and Animated Films, October 2009.

== Teaching/Visiting Faculty ==
Raghavendra has been visiting faculty at various institutions including Indian Institute of Management (Bengaluru), Shrishti School of Art and Design, Mauritius Film Development Corporation, Vishwabharati, Santiniketan, Alliance Francaise de Bangalore and the University of Hyderabad.

== FIPRESCI ==
Raghavendra has been a member of FIPRESCI, the International Federation of Film Critics. He was Secretary of the Indian chapter between 2013 and 2016. The President of the Indian chapter of FIPRESCI in this period was HN Narahari Rao.

== Bibliography ==
- MK Raghavendra, Bipolar Identity: Region, Nation and the Kannada Language Film, New Delhi: Oxford University Press, 2011.
- Frederic Jameson, ‘Third World Literature in the Age of Multi-national Capitalism’ from C Kolb and V Lokke (eds.) West Lafayette, Indiana: Purdue University Press, 1987.
- MK Raghavendra, Globalism and Indian Nationalism, Economic and Political Weekly, Vol. 41, No. 16 ( 22–28 Apr. 2006), pp. 1503–1505.
- M K Raghavendra, Social Dystopia or Entrepreneurial Fantasy: The Significance of Kaminey, Economic and Political Weekly, Vol. 45, Issue No. 10, 6 March 2010.
- M K Raghavendra, India, Higher Education and Bollywood, Economic and Political Weekly, Vol. 44, Issue No. 38, 19 September 2009.
- M K Raghavendra, Raajneeti, Politicians and CEOs, Economic and Political Weekly, Vol. 45, Issue No. 28, 10 July 2010.
- M K Raghavendra, Peepli Live and the Gesture of Concern, Economic and Political Weekly, Vol. 45, Issue No. 39, 25 September 2010.
- M K Raghavendra, A Renewal of Faith: Dabangg and Its Public, Economic and Political Weekly, Vol. 46, Issue No. 06, 5 February 2011.
- M K Raghavendra, Zindagi Na Milegi Dobara, Delhi Belly and the Imagined Nation, Economic and Political Weekly, Vol. 46, Issue No. 36, 3 September 2011.
- M K Raghavendra, Paan Singh Tomar, the Nation and the Sportsperson, Economic and Political Weekly, Vol. 47, Issue No. 17, 28 April 2012.
- MK Raghavendra, The Politics of Hindi Cinema in the New Millennium: Bollywood and the Anglophone Indian Nation, New Delhi: Oxford University Press, 2014.
- MK Raghavendra, Director's Cut: 50 Film-makers of the Modern Era, Noida: Collins, 2013.
- http://www.sfp.pl/data/files/b5/76/b5760482b6bb509/Best_Books_on_Film_2010.pdf
- MK Raghavendra, ‘Bollywood’, New Delhi: Oxford India Short Introductions, 2016.
- "www.movingimageshyd.com/talking-films-a-panel-discussion-with-rakeysh-mehra/216/". movingimageshyd.com.
- "Frame work – Delhi – The Hindu". thehindu.com. Archived from the original on 26 October 2016.
- "www.movingimageshyd.com/indian-cinema-bole-tho-a-brief-report-by-uma-magal/625/". movingimageshyd.com.
- "Bangalore Literature Festival to be hosted in Electronic City: News Desk – Citizen Matters, Bangalore News". bangalore.citizenmatters.in.
- ".:: Hyderabad Literary Festival ::". hydlitfest.in.
- "Lekhana: A Literary Weekend, 16, 17 & 18 January, 2015Sangam House | Sangam House". sangamhouse.org.
