= Mamoni Raisom Goswami =

Indian scholar and writer (1942–2011)

Indira Goswami
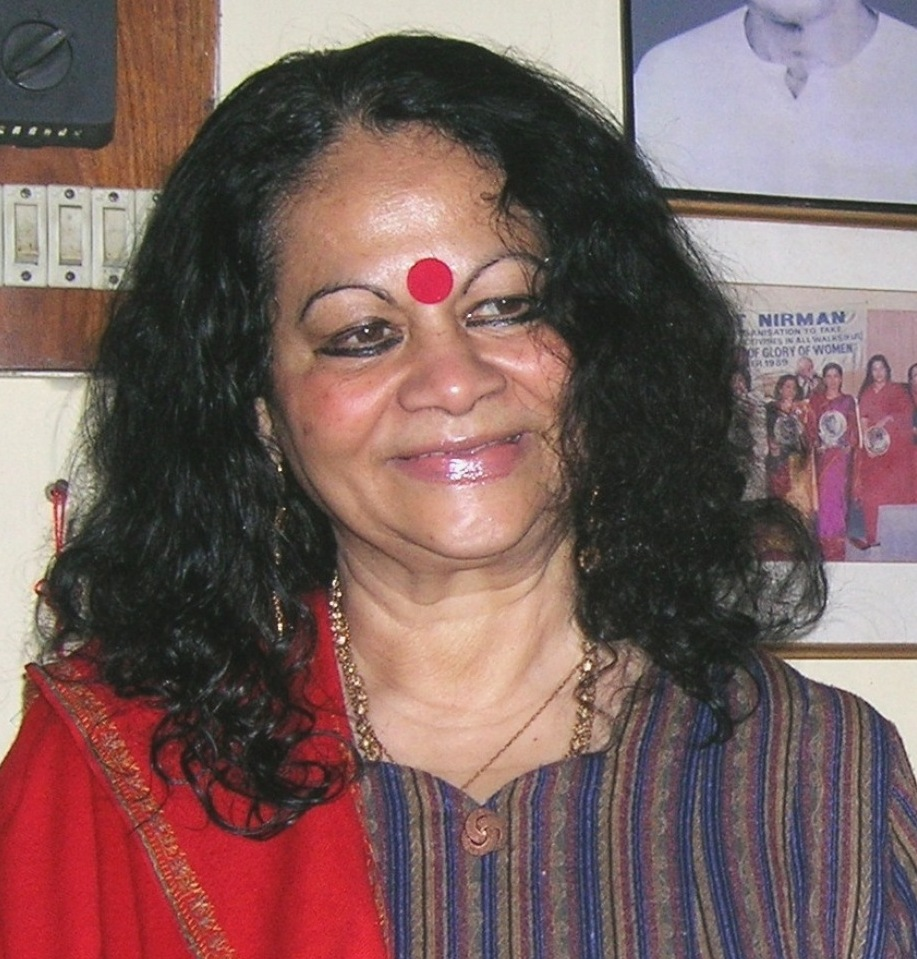
- Born: 14 November 1942; Guwahati, Assam, British India
- Died: 29 November 2011 (aged 69); Guwahati, Assam, India
- Occupations: Activist, editor, poet, professor and writer
- Spouse: Madhaven Raisom Ayengar (died)
- Writing career
- Pen name: Mamoni Raisom Goswami
- Period: 1956–2011
- Genre: Assamese literature
- Subjects: Plight of the dispossessed in India and abroad
- Notable works: -The Moth Eaten Howdah of the Tusker -The Man from Chinnamasta -Pages Stained With Blood
- Notable awards: Prince Claus Fund(2008) Padma Shri(2002) Jnanpith Award(2000)

Indira Goswami (14 November 1942 – 29 November 2011), known by her pen name Mamoni Raisom Goswami and popularly as Mamoni Baideo, was an Indian writer, poet, professor, scholar and editor.

She was the winner of the Sahitya Akademi Award (1983), the Jnanpith Award (2000) and Principal Prince Claus Laureate (2008). A celebrated writer of contemporary Indian literature, many of her works have been translated into English from her native Assamese which include The Moth-Eaten Howdah of the Tusker, Pages Stained With Blood and The Man from Chinnamasta.

She was also well known for her attempts to structure social change, both through her writings and through her role as mediator between the armed militant group United Liberation Front of Asom and the Government of India. Her involvement led to the formation of the People's Consultative Group, a peace committee. She referred to herself as an "observer" of the peace process rather than as a mediator or initiator.

Her work has been performed on stage and in film. The 1996 film Adajya is based on her novel The Moth-Eaten Howdah of the Tusker, and won international awards. Words from the Mist is a film made on her life directed by Jahnu Barua.

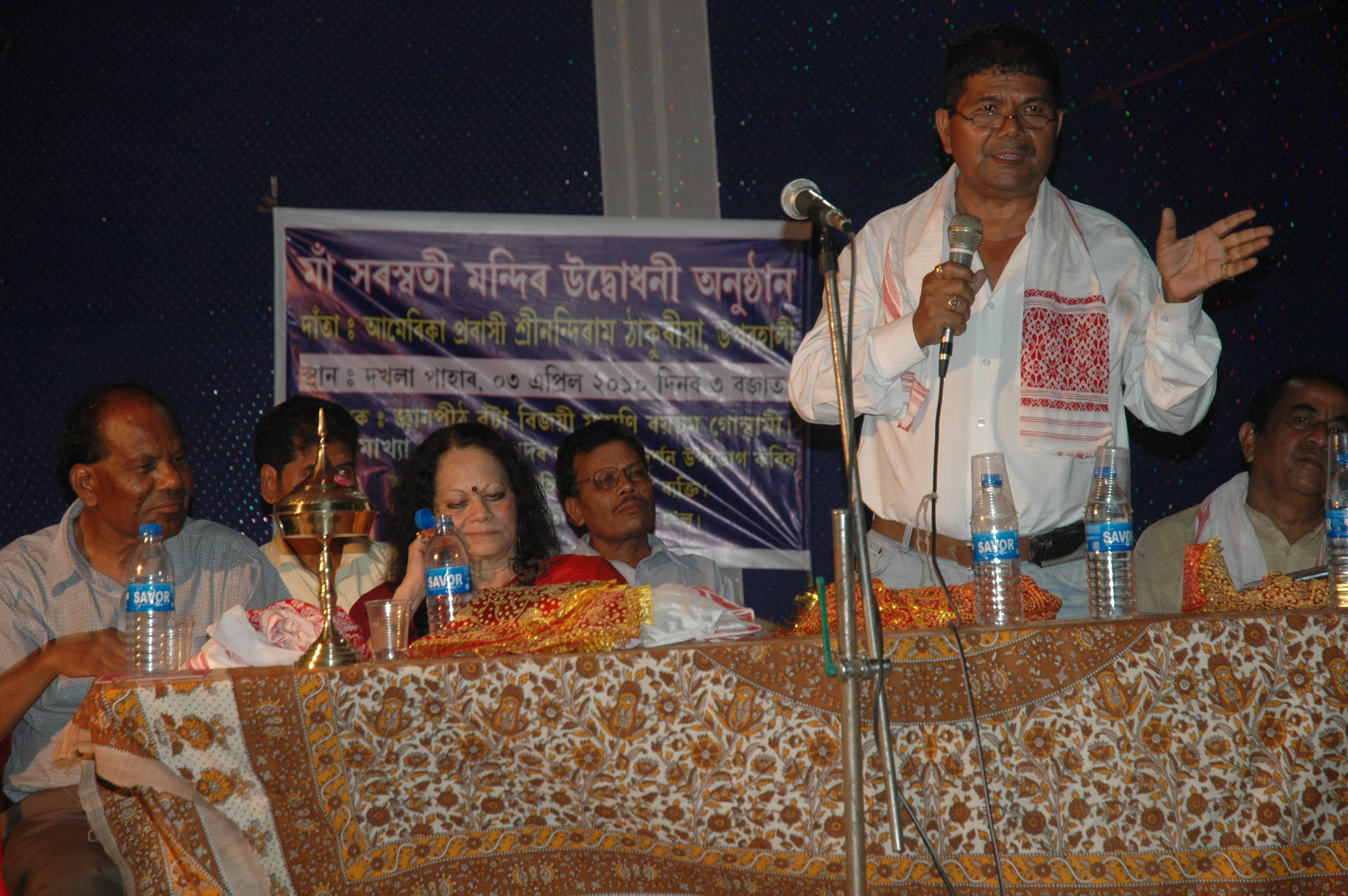
Goswami in inauguration ceremony of a 2nd India Saraswati temple at Bijoy Nagar, Guwahati

== Early life and education ==
Indira Goswami was born in Guwahati, British India to Umakanta Goswami and Ambika Devi, a Vaishnavite Brahmin family that was deeply associated with Sattra life of the Ekasarana Dharma. She studied at Latashil Primary School, Guwahati; Pine Mount School, Shillong; and Tarini Chaudhury Girls' School, Guwahati and completed Intermediate Arts from Handique Girls College, Guwahati. She majored in Assamese literature at Cotton College in Guwahati and secured a master's degree from Gauhati University in the same field of study. Indira goswami impressed by Akka Mahadevi's Kannada vachanas as she said in Bengaluru.

== Career ==
In 1962, she published her first collection of short stories, "Chinaki Morom", when she was a student.

Popularly known as Mamoni Baideo in Assam, she was encouraged by editor Kirti Nath Hazarika who published her first short stories — when she was still in Class VIII (thirteen years old) — in the literary journal he edited.

=== Depression ===
Goswami has suffered from depression since her childhood. In the opening pages of her autobiography, The Unfinished Autobiography, she mentions her inclination to jump into Crinoline Falls located near their house in Shillong. Repeated suicide attempts marred her youth. After the sudden death of her husband, Madhaven Raisom Ayengar of Karnataka, in a car accident in the Kashmir region of India, after only eighteen months of marriage, she became addicted to heavy doses of sleeping tablets. Once brought back to Assam, she joined the Sainik School, Goalpara as a teacher.

At this point she went back to writing. She claims that she wrote just to live and that otherwise it would not have been possible for her to go on living. Her experiences in Kashmir and Madhya Pradesh, Indian states where her husband had worked as an engineer, were used in her novels Ahiron and The Chehnab's Current, respectively.

=== Life in Vrindavan ===
After working at the Sainik School in Goalpara, Assam, she was persuaded by her teacher Upendra Chandra Lekharu to come to Vrindavan, Uttar Pradesh, and pursue research for peace of mind.

Her experiences as a widow as well as a researcher finds expression in her novel The Blue Necked Braja (1976), which is about the plight of the Radhaswamis of Vrindavan who lived in abject poverty and sexual exploitation in everyday life. One of the main issues that the novel touches upon is the plight of young widows for whom companionship beyond the confines of their ashrams and fellow widows become impossible. Their urge to live, as well as the moral dilemma that they face vis-a-vis the order of precepts of religion in this regard, are brought out with astonishing clarity and feeling in the novel. The novel exposed the uglier face of Vrindavan – the city of Krishna, a Hindu deity – inviting criticism of Goswami from conservative sections of the society. It remains a classic in modern Indian literature. It is autobiographical in character as she says the anguish of the main character Saudamini, reflects what she had gone through after her husband had died. It was also the first novel to be written on this subject. The novel was based on Goswami's research on the place as well as real-life experience of living in the place for several years before she joined the University of Delhi as a lecturer.

In Vrindavan she was involved in Ramayana studies. A massive volume of Tulsidas's Ramayana purchased during her stay there for just eleven rupees was a great source of inspiration in her research. This finds expression in her book Ramayana from Ganga to Brahmaputra, an unparalleled comparative study of Tulsidas's Ramayana and the fourteenth-century Assamese Ramayana written by Madhava Kandali.

=== Life at the University of Delhi ===
Goswami relocated to Delhi, India, to become Professor of Assamese in the Modern Indian Languages & Literary Studies (MIL) Department at the University of Delhi under the guidance of her lifelong mentor Prof. Bhabananda Deka, who was subservient in the introduction of Assamese Language in MIL Department of Delhi University (DU). While at the university, she wrote most of her greatest works. Several short stories, including Hridoy, Nangoth Sohor, Borofor Rani, used Delhi as the background.

During later part of her life, after she became Head of the MIL Department in Delhi University, she, in collaboration with award-winning Assamese popular short-story writer and novelist Arnab Jan Deka made efforts and persuaded Delhi University to set up a Chair in the name of Middle Age Assamese saint-philosopher-littérateur-artist Srimanta Sankardev. They also convinced the Chief Minister of Assam to make a contribution of Rupees One Million to Delhi University to create the corpus for the proposed Chair. However, Dr Goswami could not see the fruits of her effort during her lifetime.

Her two classics – Pages Stained With Blood and The Moth Eaten Howdah of a Tusker— were also written during this period. The other books completed while she lived in Delhi were Ahiron, The Rusted Sword, Uday Bhanu, Dasharathi's Steps and The Man from Chinnamasta.

In Pages Stained With Blood she writes about the plight of Sikhs in the 1984 anti-Sikh riots following the assassination of Indira Gandhi, the Prime Minister of India. Goswami had witnessed the riots while staying in the Shakti Nagar area of Delhi. She visited many of the other sites to complete this novel. She even went to G. B. Road, Delihi's red-light district, to depict the lives of the prostitutes who lived there which forms a part of her novel.

In The Moth Eaten Howdah of a Tusker she writes about the plight of Assamese Brahmin widows in Satra, religious institutions of Assam. This novel was anthologised in The Masterpieces of Indian Literature and was made into a film, Adajya, which won several national and international film-festival awards. The novel was also made into two television mini-series; Nandita Das played the role of Giribala in one of the mini-series.

At the peak of her literary career she wrote the controversial novel The Man from Chinnamasta, a critique of the thousand-years-old tradition of animal sacrifice in the famous Hindu Shakti temple to Kamakhya, a mother goddess, in Assam. Goswami reported that there was even threat to her life after writing the novel. In this novel she quotes scriptures to authenticate the argument she puts forward in the novel – to worship the Mother Goddess with flowers rather than blood. She said in an interview, "When the novel was serialized in a popular magazine, I was threatened with dire consequences. Shortly after this, a local newspaper, Sadin, carried an appeal about animal sacrifice, which resulted in quite an uproar—the editor was gheraoed and a tantrik warned me. But when the appeal was published, the response was overwhelmingly in favour of banning animal sacrifice. I also had to contend with rejection from a publisher who was initially keen and had promised me a huge advance, but who later backtracked, offering instead to publish any other book of mine. But the rest, as they say, is history and Chinnamastar Manuhto went on to become a runaway bestseller!"

Another major piece of her fiction during the period was Jatra (The Journey), based on the problem of militancy/secessionism that has affected almost the entire North-East India frontier ever since Indian independence.

Mamoni Raisom Goswami died at the Gauhati Medical College Hospital on 29 November 2011.

== Literary works ==
=== Novels ===
- 1972 Chinavar Srota (The Chenab's Current) ISBN 978-0-19-921712-0
- 1976 Neelkanthi Braja (The Blue-Necked Braja), translated by Gayatri Bhattacharya; Zubaan Books, 2013) ISBN 978-8126340798
- 1980 Ahiron ISBN 978-8126318810
- 1980 Mamore Dhora Tarowal aru Dukhon Uponyas (The Rusted Sword and Two Other Novels) ISBN 978-9324405456
- 1980 Budhosagor Dhukhor Geisha Aru Mohammed Musa
- 1988 Datal Hatir Une Khowa Howda (The Moth Eaten Howdah of a Tusker translated by the author, Rupa Publications) ISBN 9324402072
- 1989 Udaybhanur Choritro
- Nangoth Sohor
- 2001 Tej Aru Dhulire Dhusarita Prishtha (Pages Stained With Blood) ISBN 978-8185905730
- Dashorothir Khuj (Dashorothi's Footsteps)
- 2005 Chinnamastar Manuhto translated as (The Man from Chinnamasta translated by Prasanta Goswami, Katha) ISBN 9788189020385
- 2009 "Thengphakhri Tehsildaror Tamor Taruwal" ("The Bronze Sword of Thengphakhri Tehsildar") translated by Aruni Kashyap, published by Zubaan Books, 2013) ISBN 9789381017081

=== Autobiography ===
- An Unfinished Autobiography (Assamese: আধা লেখা দস্তাবেজ) ISBN 9788120711730
- biography's new pages (Assamese: দস্তাবেজ নতুন পৃষ্ঠা)
- biography's new pages (Assamese: অপ্সৰা গৃহ )
- Adha Lekha Dastabej (Assamese: আধা লিখা দস্তাবেজ) ISBN 978-8124401682

=== Short stories ===
- Beasts
- Dwarka and His Gun
- Parasu's Well
- The Journey
- Sanskar
- To Break a Begging Bowl
- Udang Bakach
- relive

=== Poetry ===
- Pain and Flesh ISBN 978-8176465915
- Pakistan
- Ode To A Whore

=== Non-fiction ===
- Ramayana from Ganga to Brahmaputra, Delhi 1996. (Research work on Saptakanda Ramayana) ISBN 978-8170188582

=== Online works ===
- "The Journey" (short story)

== Awards ==
- 1982 – Sahitya Akademi Award (for Mamore Dhora Tarowal)
- 1989 – Bharat Nirman Award
- 1992 – Sauhardya Award of Uttar Pradesh Hindi Sansthan of Government of India.
- 1993 – Katha National Award for Literature
- 1996 – Kamal Kumari Foundation National Award in 1996
- 2000 – Jnanpith Award
- 2002 – D Litt Degree from Rabindra Bharati University, West Bengal
- 2002 – Mahiyoshi Jaymati Award with a citation in gold by Ahom Court of Assam
- 2002 – Padma Shri (She refused to accept)
- 2007 – D Litt Degree from Rajiv Gandhi University Arunachal Pradesh
- 2008 – D Litt Degree from Indira Gandhi National Open University
- 2008 – Iswar Chandra Vidyasagar Gold Plate from Asiatic Society
- 2008 – Principal Laureate Prince Claus Award
- 2009 – Krishnakanta Handique Award, Asom Sahitya Sabha
- Awarded the Ambassador for Peace from the Inter Religious and International Federation for World Peace
- The International Tulsi Award from Florida International University for her book, Ramayana From Ganga To Brahmaputra
- Asom Ratna – the highest civilian award in the State of Assam, India

== See also ==
- 1984 anti-Sikh riots
- Assamese literature
- Bhabananda Deka
- Jyoti Prasad Agarwala
- Krishna Kanta Handique
- Laxminath Bezbarua
- Literature from North East India
- Mahapurusha Srimanta Sankardeva
- Music of Assam
- People's Consultative Group
- List of Indian writers
- List of Indian poets
