= Kasaravalli =

Kasaravalli is a surname. Notable people with the surname include:

- Ananya Kasaravalli Indian actress
- Apurva Kasaravalli Indian businessman
- Girish Kasaravalli (born 1950) Indian film director
- Vaishali Kasaravalli (1952 – 2010) Indian actress
