= Harish Komme =

Indian film editor (born 1985)

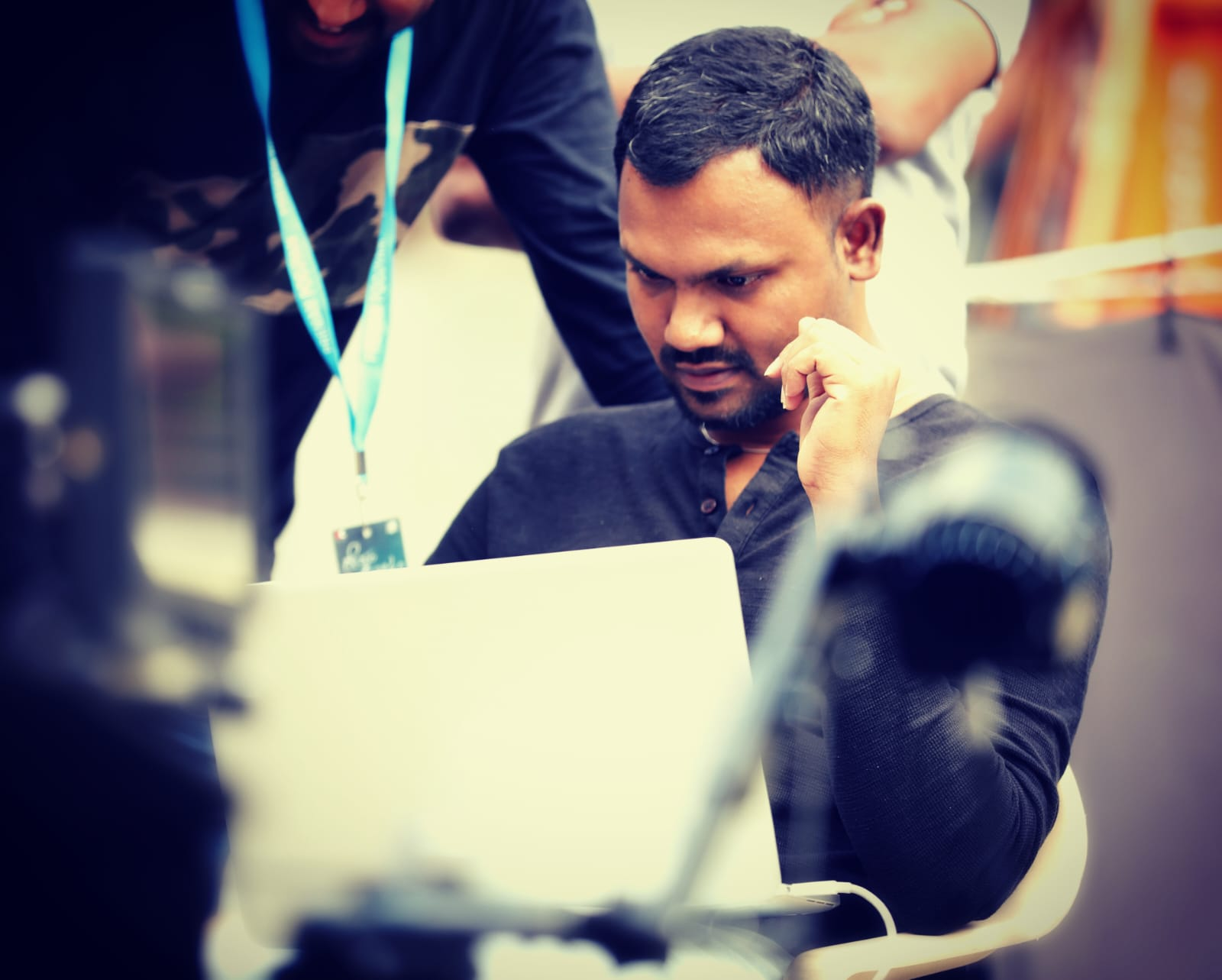
- Komme in 2019
- Born: 10 September 1985 (age 40); Bangalore, India
- Occupation: Film editor
- Years active: 2015–present
- Spouse: Sunanda N. (m. 2017)

Harish Komme, is an Indian film editor known for his works in Kannada cinema. He works predominantly on Kannada films. His Karnataka State Film Award for Best Editor was for his work on the feature film Mufti (2017) directed by Narthan.

== Career ==
He made his debut as a film editor in 2015, with the Kannada movie "Eradondla Mooru". He subsequently worked in the movie Mufti starring Dr.Shiva Rajkumar & Srii Murali, produced under the banner Jayanna Combines. The movie earned him Karnataka State Film Award for Best Editor for the year 2017.

He also worked as promo editor for a couple of films, one of which is a well-known film called Santheyalli Nintha Kabira released in the year 2016 starring Shiva Rajkumar.

He spearheaded the editing of critically acclaimed film Ammachi Yemba Nenapu which is based on Dr.Vaidehi's Short Stories directed by Champa P Shetty. Some of his recently released are Inspector Vikram (2021 film), Madhagaja and Premam Poojyam.

== Awards ==
- 2017 Karnataka State Film Award for Best Editing – Mufti

== Filmography ==
Key
†	Denotes films that have not yet been released

=== As editor ===
Year	Film	Notes
2015	Eradondla Mooru	Debut
2017	Mufti	Karnataka State Film Award for Best Editor
2018	Ammachi Yemba Nenapu	
2021	Inspector Vikram	
2021	Premam Poojyam	
2021	Madhagaja	
2022	Hope	
2022	Monsoon Raaga	
2022	Head Bush	
2022	Once Upon a Time in Jamaligudda	
2023	Daredevil Musthafa	
2023	Pahije Jatiche	Marathi film
2024	Koli Esru	
2024	Love Li	
2025	Gana	
2025	S/O Muthanna	
2025	Devil	

=== As actor ===
Year	Film	Role	Notes	Ref.
2015	Eradondla Mooru	Doctor		
2015	Mufti	Civil engineer		
2018	Ammachi Yemba Nenapu			
2021	Inspector Vikram	TV channel head		
2021	Premam Poojyam	Medical college student		
2021	Madhagaja	Cameo	In song	
2022	Hope	Personal secretary to CM		
2022	Monsoon Raaga	Frustrated family man	In song	
