= Ammachi Yemba Nenapu =

2018 drama film

- Directed by: Champa P Shetty
- Written by: Vaidehi; Champa P Shetty
- Produced by: Prakash P Shetty; Geetha Suratkal; Gouramma; Vandana Inamdar; Kala Kadamba Art Center
- Starring: Raj B. Shetty; Vyjayanti V Adiga; Diya Palakkal; Deepika Aradhya; Radhakrishna Urala
- Cinematography: I. Naveen Kumar
- Edited by: Harish Komme
- Music by: Kashinath Pattar
- Release date: 1 November 2018
- Running time: 132 minutes
- Country: India
- Language: Kannada

Ammachi Yemba Nenapu (Kannada: ಅಮ್ಮಚಿಯೆಂಬ ನೆನಪು) is a 2018 Kannada drama film directed by Champa P Shetty, based on three short stories of writer Vaidehi. The film's music is composed by Kashinath Pattar. Raj B. Shetty, Vyjayanti V Adiga, Diya Palakkal, Deepika Aradhya, Dr. Radhakrishna Urala, Geetha Suratkal, Vishwanatha Urala feature in lead roles. The movie is produced by Prakash P. Shetty, Geetha Suratkal, Vandana Inamdar, Kala Kadamba Art Center, Gouramma under the banner Apron Productions.

== Cast ==
- Raj B. Shetty as Venkapayya
- Vyjayanti V. Adiga as Ammachi
- Diya Palakkal as Younger Sita
- Deepika Aradhya as Akku
- Vaidehi as Older Sita
- Radhakrishna Urala Puttamatte
- Geetha Suratkal as Sheshamma
- Vishwanatha Urala as Vasu
- B G Ramakrishna as Annayya
- Chandrahasa Ullal as Akkus Husband

== Soundtrack ==
The soundtrack of the film is composed by Kashinath Pattar. Dr. Vaidehi has written the lyrics for all the songs.

No.	Title	Singer	Length
1.	"Holeva Holeyachege(Slow)"	Anuradha Bhat
2.	"Sarapali Illade"	Mangala Ravi
3.	"Yelu Suttina Kote"	Anuradha Bhat
4.	"Kela Hoova Hanebaraha"	Sangeetha Katti
5.	"Kitakiyacheya Kala"	Manasa Holla

== Critical reception ==
The film received positive reviews from critics. Deccan Herald wrote "Picturesquely shot in the coastal with the characters speaking Kundapura Kannada, the film is indeed a marvel. The way Champa handles the tale is subtle and sensitive without getting preachy". The News Minute wrote "A Beautiful Kannada Film the celebrates women." International Business Times wrote "It is a touching story on women sans melodrama. It is a brave attempt to tell a story in Kundapura dialect. The characters will remain in your mind even after coming out of theatres. That's the impact the Vaidehi's screenplay and dialogues have on the viewers. It is a much watch if you are a genuine fan of Kannada movies." Film Companion wrote "A Social Drama That Joins The Ranks Of This Year’s Gems In Kannada Cinema." The New Indian Express wrote "Watching the film is like reading the book and this experiment by Champa makes for a worthwhile watch." The Times of India wrote "Ammachi Yemba Nenapu is a film that unfolds at its own pace and has some really intense moments. It is definitely one of the better films to have released this year."
