= Harikatha Prasanga =

- Directed by: Ananya Kasaravalli
- Screenplay by: Girish Kasaravalli; Gopalakrishna Pai; Ananya Kasaravalli
- Based on: Beladi Harishchandra by Gopalakrishna Pai
- Produced by: Basant Kumar Patil; Amrutha B Patil; Abhishek Patil (presenter)
- Starring: Shrunga Vasudevan
- Cinematography: Udit Khurana; Balaji Manohar
- Edited by: Mohan Kamakshi
- Music by: Bindhumalini
- Production company: Basanth Productions
- Release date: 2016
- Country: India
- Language: Kannada

Harikatha Prasanga (released in film festivals as Chronicles of Hari) is a 2016 Indian Kannada-language film directed by Ananya Kasaravalli in her directorial debut. The film features Shrunga Vasudevan in the titular role. The music is composed by Bindhumalini.

The film is based on a short story named Beladi Harishchandra by writer Gopalakrishna Pai. Pai also wrote the screenplay for the film alongside Girish Kasaravalli and Ananya. It competed for the Centenary Award (Best Debut Feature of a Director) at IFFI. It was also the first Kannada cinema to be selected for the Busan International Film Festival. The film was also screened at the Museum of Moving Image - MOMI New York, and the Jio MAMI Film Festival and the IFFK among several others.

== Synopsis ==
Harikatha Prasanga (Chronicles of Hari) is set in a coastal town of southern India. It narrates the story of a Yakshagana artist Hari, who has gained extreme popularity portraying female roles. The story of Hari's life unfolds through different perspectives captured in three episodes across four audio-visual interviews conducted by filmmakers Sharmila and Sundar, primarily interested in investigating and documenting on his whereabouts.

During the course of the interview, it is revealed that Hari's daily routine involved being awake all night impersonating the role of a woman and sleeping during the day when he is himself, a man. Despite the immense fame, Hari shares a troubled relationship with his brother.

Hari faces an emotional turmoil in his personal life too. Plans of his marriage fail due to the very reason of him playing female roles. A prostitute he visits refers to him, affectionately, as "Sister." As a result of these incidents, an inner conflict, the question about his 'real self', starts to haunt him. His requests for male roles are dismissed. Dejected, Hari quits his troupe, changes his gender role in real life and takes to partial cross-dressing, much to the embarrassment of his brother and his family. To make things worse, his cross-dressing becomes the cause for the fall of his brother's marriage. This leads to a fight between the siblings, forcing Hari to leave the house.

Hari moves out of his village, embraces cross-dressing completely and looks forward to a new beginning. He joins a new Yakshagana troupe where he continues to portray female roles hoping to recreate the magical moments of his life with his new identity. However, the impact of staying away from his village, losing his family and the inability to perform on stage under pressure just aggravates the conflict. Will Hari be able to win over his conflicts? Where does this journey lead him? What secrets do Sharmila and Sundar discover?

== Cast ==
- Shrunga Vasudevan as Hari
- K G Krishnamurthy
- Siri
- Ganesh
- Champa Shetty

== Production ==
While working on her documentary film Wasiyat Nama, Beyond Binary, she was introduced to Beladi Harishchandra by Gopalakrishna Pai after discussing with him how performative gender roles are. Shrunga Vasudevan, a theatre actor from Ranga Shankara, plays the lead role.

== Reception ==
Reviewing the film at Jio MAMI Film Festival in Mumbai, Deborah Young of The Hollywood Reporter wrote that the film is "Mysterious and poetic if a bit static and sad, with very little dialogue to support the narrative". Sankha Ray of Asian Movie Pulse wrote, "The movie has many ingredients to stimulate our thoughts and is a must watch for the thoughtful audience".

== Accolades ==
It won the Best Film in the Indian Cinema Competition at the 9th Bengaluru International Film Festival.
