= Inspector Vikram =

Inspector Vikram may refer to:

- Inspector Vikram (1989 film), an Indian Kannada-language comedy thriller film
- Inspector Vikram (2021 film), an Indian Kannada-language action film
