= Koli Esru =

- Theatrical release poster
- Directed by: Champa P Shetty
- Written by: Champa P Shetty
- Story by: K T Chikanna
- Based on: Huchheeri Esarina Prasanga by K T Chikanna
- Starring: Akshatha Pandavpura; Apeksha Nagaraj; Natana Manju; Prakash Shetty; Dakshayani N
- Cinematography: Francis Rajkumar
- Edited by: Harish Komme
- Production company: Apron Productions
- Release date: 26 January 2024
- Running time: 84 minutes
- Country: India
- Language: Kannada

Koli Esru (transl. Chicken Curry) is a 2024 Indian Kannada-language drama film based on the story Huchheeri Esarina Prasanga by K T Chikkanna. Akshatha Pandavpura, Apeksha Nagaraj Chornahalli, Natana Manju, Prakash Shetty, and Dakshayani N feature in lead roles. The movie was jointly produced by Vanaja Vaman Rao, Sujatha Gopinath, M. G. Satya Prasad, Gouramma, Harish Komme, Mahesh Togata, Prathap R Mendon, Dileep Shetty, Vandana Inamdaar, Venu Hennur, Geetha Surathkal, Radhakrishna Ural, and Prakash P Shetty under the banner Apron Productions.

The film was released in theatres across Karnataka on 26 January 2024.

== Plot ==
The film, set in the 1980s, is the story of Huchheeri, a poor woman who makes sacrifices and undergoes great difficulties just to give her beloved ten-year-old daughter a taste of chicken curry.

Deprived of motherly love at a tender age, Huchheeri is married off by her step-mother to a drunkard, separating her from her loving father and idyllic village.

Huchheeri's daughter informs her of chicken curry being prepared at the chieftain's home. Huchheeri cooks some rice in the hope of getting some chicken curry to fulfill her daughter's craving just once. Since she had lost her mother at a very young age, she intends to undergo any hardship to make her daughter happy.

The narration of events that happens in a span of 24 hours in Hucheeri's life represents a larger story of both traditional and modern women's struggles against injustice just to survive in the face of patriarchal and societal pressures.

== Cast ==
- Akshatha Pandavpura as Huchheeri
- Apeksha Nagaraj Chornahalli as Lachhu
- Natana Manju as Gende Kala
- Prakash Shetty as Hucheri's Husband
- Dakshayani N as Chikkirid

== Film festival selections ==
- New York Indian Film Festival
- Indo German Film Week
- Indian Film Festival of Melbourne
- International Film Festival of Irinjalakuda
- International Film Festival of Thrissur
- Ajanta Ellora International Film Festival
- Ottawa Indian Film Festival
- Bengaluru International Film Festival
- Nitte International Film Festival

== Awards ==
Year	Film Festival	Award	Result	Ref
2023	Ajanta Ellora International Film Festival	Best Actress, Best Child Artist	Won	
2023	Bengaluru International Film Festival	Best Film (Chitrabharati Award)	Won	
2023	Ottawa Indian Film Festival	Best Director, Best Actress	Won	
2023	Indian Film Festival of Melbourne	Best Actress	Nominated	
