= Pavitra Lokesh =

Indian film and television actress (born 1966)

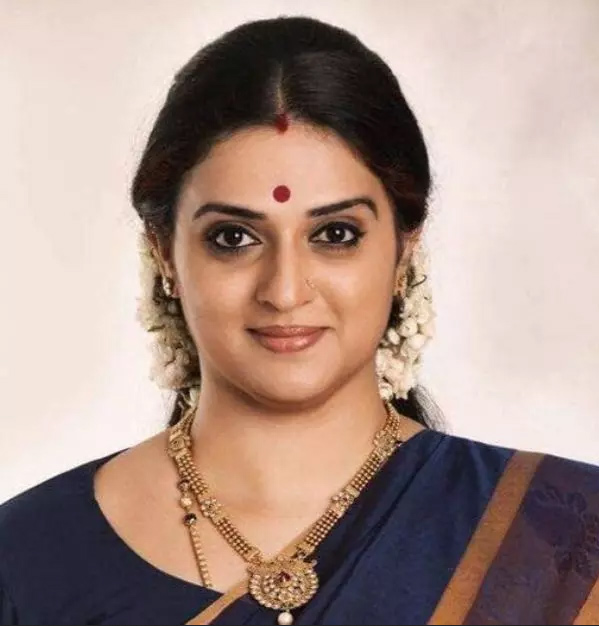
- Born: 17 November 1979 (age 46); Mysore, Karnataka, India
- Occupation: Actress
- Years active: 1994–present
- Spouse: Naresh (m. 2023)
- Partner: Suchendra Prasad (2007–2018)
- Father: Mysore Lokesh
- Relatives: Adi Lokesh (brother)

Pavitra Lokesh is an Indian film and television actress. She appears primarily in Kannada, Telugu and Tamil films playing supporting roles. The daughter of stage and film actor Mysore Lokesh, she made her film debut at the age of 16 and has since appeared in over 150 Kannada films. At 5 feet 10 inches she was the tallest actress at that time, but managing to do several noteworthy roles even acting alongside shorter leading men. For her performance in the Kannada film Naayi Neralu (2006), she was awarded the Karnataka State Film Award for Best Actress. Her husband Naresh is also an actor.

== Early life ==
Pavitra was born in Mysore. Her father, Mysore Lokesh, was an actor and her mother, a teacher. She has a younger brother, Adi Lokesh. Her father died when Pavitra was in Class nine. Upon securing 80 per cent in her matriculation examination, she aspired to become a civil servant. However, following her father's death, she decided to help her mother who she said was "overburdened with family responsibilities". Initially reluctant to follow her father's footsteps towards a career in acting, she completed her bachelor's degree in commerce from SBRR Mahajana First Grade College, Mysore, and appeared for the Civil Services Examination. After failing to clear the examination in her first attempt, she took to acting before moving to Bangalore.

== Personal life ==
Pavitra got divorced from her first husband who was a software engineer. Since 2007, she was in a live-in-relationship with actor Suchendra Prasad before they separated in 2018.

Later, it was reported that she had started dating Telugu actor Naresh. They both worked in the film Malli Pelli, released in 2023. The two married in 2023. It is her second marriage and Naresh's fourth marriage.

== Career ==
=== Films ===
Pavitra took to acting in 1994 on the advice of actor Ambareesh. She made her debut in Mister Abhishek (1995) that saw the latter play the lead role. In the same year, she appeared in Bangarada Kalasha. Having not gained recognition from these films, Pavitra completed her graduation and began working for a human resource consulting company. During the time, T. S. Nagabharana offered her a role in his film Janumada Jodi that released in 1996. Speaking about this phase in a 2006 interview with The Hindu, she said, "I never felt comfortable. I felt lonely. But when Nagabharana insisted, I had to take a decision. I resolved to make films my career - no preparation. The only reason to take a plunge was my circumstances. It has been tough to keep it going without a godfather or a guide. So I just accepted every film that came my way." Not being offered lead roles due to her height, she continued playing supporting roles. In the comedy Ulta Palta (1997), she played a vamp.

Pavitra received critical acclaim for her performance in Girish Kasaravalli's period drama Naayi Neralu (2006), a film based on S. L. Bhyrappa's novel of the same name. Impressed by her performance in the television soap Guptagamini, Kasaravalli cast her as a widowed Venkatalakshmi, daughter-in-law and mother of two other characters; the film revolving around these three characters living under one roof, and projecting their own perspectives exposing generation gap in a conflict-ridden society. Her portrayal of a woman caught between tradition and desire won her the Karnataka State Film Award for Best Actress.

=== Television ===
In Nagabharana's television soap Jeevanmukhi, she was cast as a middle-aged widow, a role that was received well. She received recognition for her role in the soap Guptagamini that was aired in the early 2000s. "She played a wife, a mother and a sister caught in the web of human emotions". During the time, she also appeared in other soaps such as Gelathi, Neethi Chakra, Dharitri, Punarjanma and Eshwari.

== Partial filmography ==
=== Kannada ===
- Mister Abhishek (1995)...Gayatri
- Bangarada Kalasha (1995)
- Janumada Jodi (1996)
- Ulta Palta (1997)
- Tavarina Theru (1997)
- Mavana Magalu (1997)
- Kurubana Rani (1998)
- Jagath Kiladi (1998)
- Yajamana (2000)
- Amma (2001)
- Huchcha (2001)
- Mussanje (2001)
- Namma Samsara Ananda Sagara (2001)
- Shivappa Nayaka (2001)
- Naanu Naane (2002)
- Makeup (2002)
- Border (2003)
- Raja Narasimha (2003)
- Ondagona Baa (2003)
- Bala Shiva (2003)
- Ree Swalpa Bartheera (2003)
- Namma Preethiya Ramu (2003)
- Excuse Me (2003)
- Vijayasimha (2003)
- Swathi Muthu (2003)
- Malla (2004)
- Monda (2004)
- Nija (2004)
- Love (2004)
- Rakshasa (2005)
- Aakash (2005)
- Gowramma (2005)
- Shubham (2006)
- Pandavaru (2006)
- Student (2006)
- Naayi Neralu (2006)...Venkatalakshmi
- Ee Rajeev Gandhi Alla (2007)
- Ee Preethi Onthara (2007)
- Masti (2007)
- Manasugula Mathu Madhura (2008)
- Satya in Love (2008)
- Mr. Garagasa (2008)
- Moggina Jade (2008)
- Mandakini (2008)
- Savaari (2009)
- Hatrick Hodi Maga (2009)...Durgi
- Anishchitha (2010)
- Hoo (2010)...Doctor Pavithra
- Holi (2010)
- Kanasemba Kudureyaneri (2010)
- Kalgejje (2011)
- Hori (2011)
- Dudde Doddappa (2011)
- Aata (2011)
- Bete (2011)
- Prarthane (2012)...Shanti
- Gandhi Smiles (2012)
- Barfi (2013)
- Sneha Yathre (2013)
- Gharshane (2014)
- Rose (2014)
- Bahaddur (2014)
- Neenade Naa (2014)
- Chirayu (2014)
- Endendigu (2015)
- Lodde (2015)
- Dove (2015)
- Ganga (2015)...Ganga's sister
- Naanu Mattu Varalakshmi (2016)
- Kurukshetra (2019)...Subhadra
- Apoorva (2016)
- Dia (2020)...Dr. Lakshmi, Adi's mother
- Pogaru (2021)...Shiva's mother
- Mr. Bachelor (2023)
- Siren (2023)
- Sapta Saagaradaache Ello – Side A (2023)...Priya's mother

=== Telugu ===
- Dongodu (2003)
- Aalayam (2008)
- Fitting Master (2009) Meghana's mother
- Prasthanam (2010) as Mitra's mother
- Baava (2010) as Veerababu's mother
- Orange (2010) as Jaanu's mother
- Shakti (2011) as Aishwarya's mother
- Solo (2011) as Vaishnavi's mother
- Gouravam (2013)
- Race Gurram (2014) as Ram and Lucky's mother
- Rough (2014) as Chandu's Mother
- Current Theega (2014) as Parvati
- Lakshmi Raave Maa Intiki (2014)
- Pataas (2015) as Kalyan's mother
- Malli Malli Idi Rani Roju (2015) as Parvati
- Temper (2015) as Lakshmi's mother
- Tungabhadra (2015) as Gowri's mother
- Yevade Subramanyam (2015) as Rishi's mother
- S/O Satyamurthy (2015) as Sharadha Satyamurthy
- Bengal Tiger (2015)
- Pandaga Chesko (2015) as Karthik's mother
- Bruce Lee - The Fighter (2015) as Karthik's mother
- Loafer (2015) as Mouni's mother
- Krishnashtami (2016)
- Dictator (2016) as Rajashekar's wife
- Speedunnodu (2016) as Lakshmi
- Katamarayudu (2017) as Pavitra
- Duvvada Jagannadham (2017) as DJ's mother
- Jai Lava Kusa (2017) as Jai, Lava, Kusa's mother
- Raja The Great (2017) as Gayatri
- MCA (Middle Class Abbayi) (2017) as Warangal Siva's mother
- Agnyaathavaasi (2018) as Kumari
- Jai Simha (2018) as Vasantha
- Sammohanam (2018) as Vijay's mother
- Pantham (2018) as Durgadevi Surana
- Sammohanam (2018) as Anasuya(Vijay's mother)
- Tej I Love You (2018) as Tej's aunt
- Saakshyam (2018) as Viswa's adopted mother
- Happy Wedding (2018) as Anand's mother
- Mr. Majnu (2019) as Vicky's aunt
- Chitralahari (2019) as Swetcha's mother
- Evaru (2019) as Adarsh Varma's mother
- Sye Raa Narasimha Reddy (2019) as Neelamma
- Choosi Choodangaane (2020) as Siddu's mother
- Entha Manchivaadavuraa (2020) as Gayatri
- Ashwathama (2020) as Gana and Priya's mother
- Red (2021) as Con artist Pavithra
- Ardha Shathabdham (2021) as Lakshmi
- Dear Megha (2021) as Aadi's mother
- Sarkaru Vaari Paata (2022) as Mahi's mother
- Ante Sundaraniki (2022) as Doctor
- Ramarao on Duty (2022) as Mahalakshmi
- Dhamaka (2022) as Devaki Chakravarthy
- Kalyanam Kamaneeyam (2023) as Shruti's mother
- Malli Pelli (2023) as Parvathy
- The Great Indian Suicide (2023)
- Fear (2024)

=== Tamil ===
Year	Film	Role
2013	Gouravam	Pasupathy's wife
2019	Ayogya	Sandhya and Bhavani's mother
2022	Koogle Kuttappa	Pavithra
2022	Veetla Vishesham	Sowmya's mother

== Television ==
- Jeevanmukhi
- Guptagamini
- Eshwari (2004)
- Swabhimaana
- Pasupu Kumkuma
- Olave Namma Baduku (2007)
- Devi
- Punnaga (2017)
- Aramane Gili (2019)
- 11th Hour (2021) as Gayatri Reddy; Aha web series
- Lakshmi Nivasa

== Awards and nominations ==
Film	Year	Award	Category	Result	Ref.
Naayi Neralu	2005–06	Karnataka State Film Awards	Best Actress	Won	
Malli Malli Idi Rani Roju	2015	Filmfare Awards South	Best Supporting Actress – Telugu	Nominated	
Malli Malli Idi Rani Roju	2015	South Indian International Movie Awards	Best Supporting Actress - Telugu	Nominated	
