= Champa Shetty =

Indian filmmaker and theater personality

Champa P Shetty
- Born: Champakamalini T L Bengaluru
- Other name: Champa Shetty
- Occupations: Actor, film director, screenwriter, voice-over artist
- Spouse: Prakash P Shetty
- Children: 2

Champa Shetty is an Indian actor, filmmaker, screenwriter and voice-over artist who works primarily in Kannada film industry and Kannada theatre. Shetty is known for her women centric films.

== Career ==
Shetty started her career in the film industry as a successful voice over/dubbing artist. She has also been awarded Karnataka State Film Award for Best Dubbing Artist (Female) for the year 2007-08 for her performance in the movie Kurunadu. Before entering cinema, in early 2000s she worked as a prime time news reader for Udaya News. She has also worked in the Kannada television series Kaveri directed by Nagathihalli Chandrashekhar, Nakutanthi directed by B. Suresha, Parama Pada directed by Yogaraj Bhat and Mukta Mukta directed by T. N. Seetharam.

She made her film debut as an actor playing the mother of the protagonist in the film Belakinedege and later acted in a similar role in Harikatha Prasanga a film directed by Ananya Kasaravalli.

Shetty debuted as a film director through her 2018 critically acclaimed women centric film Ammachi Yemba Nenapu.

Her second directional film Koli Esru won the Best film in the Indian Cinema Competition section at Bengaluru International Film Festival-2023.

In addition to her work in films and TV, Shetty is actively involved in Kannada theatre and has directed the theatre productions Gandhi Banda and Akku.

== Filmography ==
=== As actor ===
==== Films ====
| Year | Film | Role | Notes |
|---|---|---|---|
| 2013 | Belakinedege | | |
| 2018 | Harikatha Prasanga | | |

==== Telefilms and teleserials ====
| Name | Role | Director |
|---|---|---|
| Kaveri | Saraswati | Nagathihalli Chandrashekhar |
| Nakutanthi | Advocate Champa | B. Suresha |
| Parama Pada | MLA's wife | Yogaraj Bhat |
| Mukta Mukta | Geervani | T. N. Seetharam |

==== Theatre ====
| Play | Role | Director | Troupe |
|---|---|---|---|
| Hayavadana | Padmini | B V Karanth | Benaka |
| Manteswamy Katha Prasanga | Doddamaji | Suresh Anagalli | Prayoga Ranga |
| Siri Purandara | Vanajakshi | Suresh Anagalli | Prayoga Ranga |
| Ashadada Ondu Dina/Aashad Ke Ek Din | Rajakumari/Princess | Dr. Sudhendra Sharma | Kala Maitri(Bangalore University) |
| Hayavadana | Padmini | Dr. K. Ramakrishna | Kala Maitri(Bangalore University) |

=== As director ===
| Year | Film |
|---|---|
| 2018 | Ammachi Yemba Nenapu |
| 2022 | Koli Esru |

== Awards ==
| Year | Film | Award | Category | Result | Ref |
|---|---|---|---|---|---|
| 2023 | Koli Esru | Bengaluru International Film Festival | Best Film (Chitrabharati Award) | Won | |
| 2023 | Koli Esru | Ottawa Indian Film Festival | Best Director | Won | |
