= Prarthane =

Indian Kannada-language film

- Directed by: Sadashiva Shenoy
- Produced by: G C Pushpa
- Starring: Anant Nag; Prakash Raj; Pavitra Lokesh
- Cinematography: S Ramachandra
- Edited by: Anil Naidu
- Music by: Veer Samarth
- Release date: 6 January 2012
- Country: India
- Language: Kannada

Prarthane (transl. Prayer) is a 2012 Indian Kannada-language film directed by Sadashiva Shenoy and starring Anant Nag, Prakash Raj and Pavitra Lokesh in lead roles.

== Cast ==
- Anant Nag
- Pavitra Lokesh
- Prakash Raj
- Sudha Murty
- Master Manoj
- Master Sachin
- Ashok
- B. C. Patil
- Dinesh Mangalore
- Srinivas Prabhu

== Music ==
Prarthane

Soundtrack album by Veer Samarth
- Released: 2012
- Recorded: 2012
- Genre: Feature film soundtrack
- Length: 5:38
- Language: Kannada

Official audio
- Prarthane - Full Album on YouTube

Track listing
No.	Title	Singer(s)	Length
1.	"Jayabhaarathi Bhuvaneshwari"	Vijay Prakash	5:38
Total length:			25:28

== Reception ==
=== Critical response ===
B S Srivani from Deccan Herald wrote "The artwork and background score also add to the mood. Dialogues, co-written by J M Prahlad and the director himself, sometimes do stray towards turning preachy, but that’s it. Prarthane is a bold film in times of wanton neglect of legacies built with blood and sweat. Will those concerned hear this prayer though?" A critic from News18 India wrote "Veera Samarth gives a good background score for the film and the song "Jayabharathi" is soothing to ears. Camera work is average. Prarthane is a really good attempt and deserves to be encouraged". A critic from Bangalore Mirror wrote "Sudha Murty makes a disastrous film debut. Her plea for Kannada medium schools, that forms part of the climax, is nothing short of a histrionic equivalent of hara-kiri. Unable to dub fluently, she makes a mess of her role. The main problem of the film is a weak script and even the background score which, at some places, sounds like the ‘bits’ inserted in seedy morning shows".
