= Naayi Neralu =

2006 film by Girish Kasaravalli

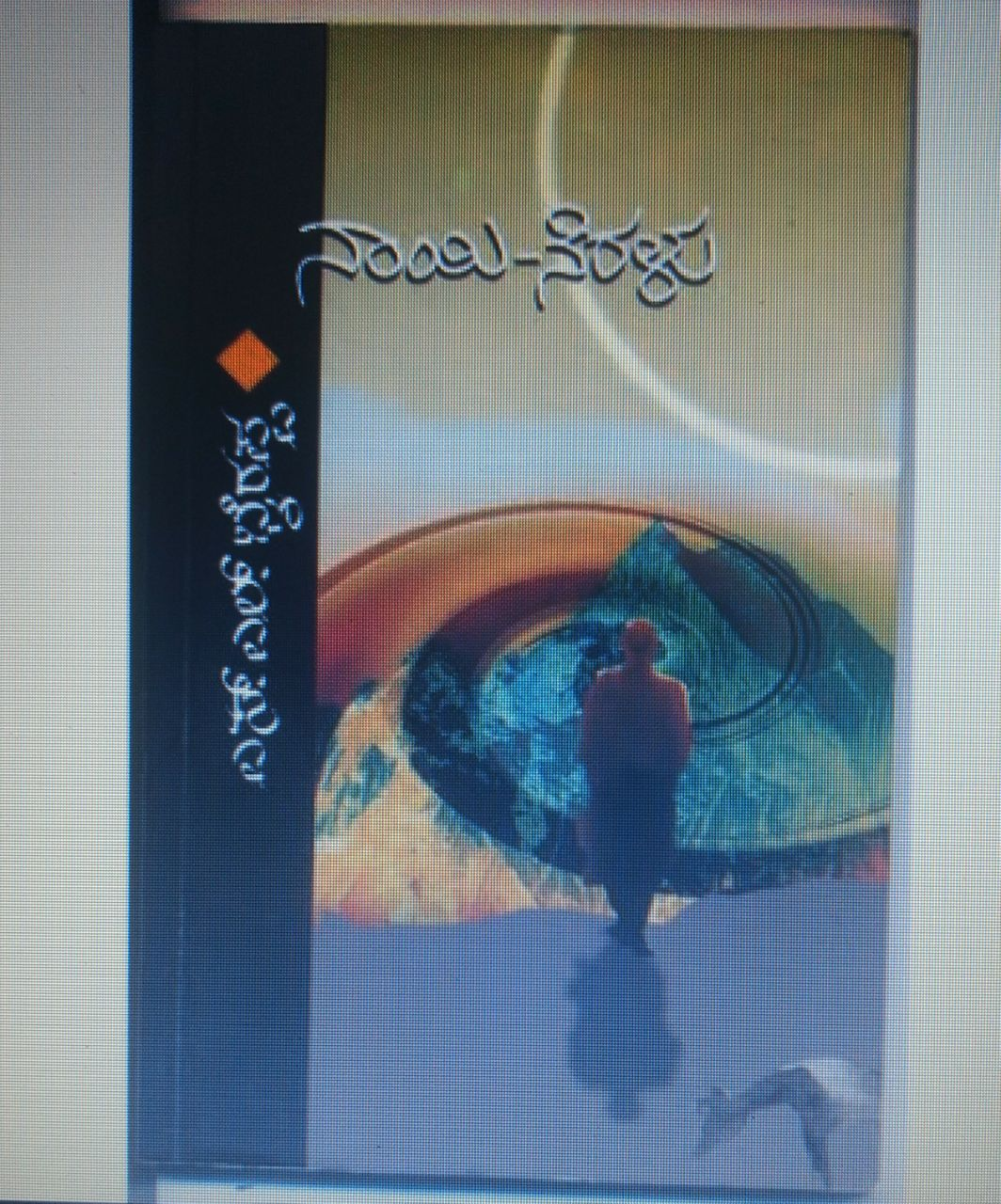
- Movie in book format poster
- Directed by: Girish Kasaravalli
- Screenplay by: Girish Kasaravalli
- Story by: S. L. Bhyrappa
- Based on: Naayi Neralu by S. L. Bhyrappa
- Produced by: Abhishek Patil; Basanth Kumar Patil
- Starring: Pavitra Lokesh; Rameshwari Varma; Sringeri Ramanna; Ashwin Bolar; Ananya Kasaravalli
- Cinematography: S. Ramachandra
- Edited by: S. Manohar
- Music by: Isaac Thomas Kottukapally
- Distributed by: Basanth Productions
- Release date: 27 September 2006 (India)
- Running time: 130 minutes
- Country: India
- Language: Kannada

Naayi Neralu (Shadow of the Dog) is a 2006 Indian Kannada language film directed by Girish Kasaravalli, based on a novel of the same name by writer S. L. Bhyrappa and has Pavitra Lokesh in the lead role.

The film won three Karnataka State Film Awards. The film is mostly shot in coastal areas of Karnataka near Udupi Nadibettu House at Shirva, Billampadavu Shooting House, house of one Rajeshwar Shashtri Dravid of Chakrakodi near Moodambail and island near Kallianpur and Kundapura.

== Plot ==
Acchanniah lives with his wife Nagalakshmi and his widowed daughter-in-law Venkatalakshmi in a remote village in Karnataka. His granddaughter Rajalakshmi is in a distant city completing her studies. Acchanniah learns from a friend that a young man in a distant village claims that he was the son of Acchanniah in his previous birth. He dismisses the information as baseless. But his ailing wife believes or rather chooses to believe that her son who died twenty years ago has come back.

Acchanniah sets out to meet the young man who is about twenty years old and provides some information regarding his previous birth which tallies with or appears to tally with his previous birth. Acchanniah brings home this man whose name is Vishwa. Acchannaih's wife realises a new purpose in living and accepts this stranger as her son. But Venkatalakshmi, Acchanniah's daughter-in-law, finds it difficult to accept some stranger as her long-lost husband. After some initial resistance, Venkatalakshmi realises that this is an opportunity to attain all that she is restrained from. Her desires emerge again and she accepts Vishwa as her husband. It is here that problems start.

The society which forced her to believe it is her husband does not approve of Venkatalakshmi accepting the man as her husband and living with him. Rajalakshmi swears that this stranger who is her age is not her father. She tries to convince her mother to come out of such a delusion but to no avail. Acchanniah and Nagalakshmi are shocked to hear that Venkatalakshmi is pregnant with Vishwa's child. Matter complicate and Acchanniah is humiliated in the public by his fellow Brahmins. Venkatalakshmi sensing the intensity of the situation leaves the village and lives in a god-forsaken place with Vishwa. She has a hard life trying to manage ends meet. Vishwa is an eccentric young man and keeping him in control is not easy. To worsen things, Vishwa is attracted to Sukri, a young woman from the worker class. Nagalakshmi dies unable to digest these bizarre happenings. Rajalakshmi decides to seek the help of the court to get her mother back. They file a false complaint on Vishwa. Aware of the family's sinister motives, Vishwa refuses to return to Venkatalakshmi.

Meanwhile, a daughter is born to Venkatalakshmi. The court announces Vishwa guilty and he is sent to two years rigorous imprisonment. But Venkatalakshmi declares that she will wait for him to be released although she is certain that he will not return to her. She tells her daughter that she never believed that Vishwa was her husband reincarnate.

== Cast ==
- Pavitra Lokesh as Venkatalakshmi
- Rameshwari Varma as Nagalakshmi
- Sringeri Ramanna as Ajjaiah
- Ananya Kasaravalli as Rajalakshmi
- Ashwin Bolar as Vishweshwara
- A. R. Chandrasekhara
- Ramesh

== Awards and screenings ==
- Karnataka State Film Awards 2005-06.
  - First Best Film
  - Best Director – Girish Kasaravalli
  - Best Actress – Pavitra Lokesh

V Shantaram Awards:

- Best Director – Girish Kasaravalli

Osian's Asian Film Festival, CINEFAN, 2006:

- Jury award in the Indian Film Category

Karachi International Film Festival, 2006

- Best Feature Film

International Film Festival Of Mumbai, MAMI Awards, 2007

- Best film
- Best Direction award for Girish Kasaravalli

Screenings

- Indian International Film Festival, 2006
- Third Eye Film Festival, 2006
- Palm Springs Film Festival, 2006
- International Film Festival Of Rotterdam in the Masteros category, 2007
- Singapore International Film Festival, 2007
- Bangkok Film Festival, 2007

== Release ==
=== Critical reception ===
Maithili Rao, reviewing for Frontline, said "The film's overall impact - with notable contributions from S. Ramachandra Aithal's marvellous cinematography, Ramesh Desai's impeccable art direction and the mastery of three Kannada dialects spoken in the three different areas of Karnataka - this note of stoic (but not resigned, there is a difference) waiting makes Venkatalaxmi a believable character. Heroism lies in scaling down to everyday reality, not holding up implausible banners of cardboard radicalism" R G Vijayasarathy reviewing for Rediff.com rated the film 3.5 out of 5 stars, wrote "Lokesh has delivered one of the best performances of her career; she excels in the last few sequences. Ananya Kasaravalli, as the daughter who wants her mother to be progressive, has turned in an authentic performance too. Sringeri Ramanna proves he is one of the finest character artists in the industry today. Cinematoghrapher S Ramachandra's work is outstanding, so is the background music. "
