= Images/Reflections =

- Directed by: Girish Kasaravalli
- Based on: Film-making career of Adoor Gopalakrishnan
- Produced by: Films Division of India
- Cinematography: Sunny Joseph
- Edited by: Mohan Kamakshi
- Release date: 13 April 2015 (Bangalore)
- Running time: 88 mins
- Country: India
- Language: English

Images/Reflections is a documentary film on Adoor Gopalakrishnan directed by Girish Kasaravalli. The documentary was first screened in April 2015 in Bangalore.

== Plot ==
The documentary portrays Gopalakrishnan's journey as a film director. The film begins with an evening scene depicting Gopalakrishnan lighting an oil lamp. A large portion of the documentary contains conversations/questions-answers between Kasaravalli and Gopalakrishnan. The career and works of Gopalakrishnan is divided into five parts ("chapters"): Kathapurushan (The man of the story), Mukhamukham (Face to face), Adoor Gopalakrishnan as seen by Naalu Pennungal (Four Women), Swayamvaram (Making one's own choices), and Anantharam (An Epilogue). The film also highlights and revisits a number of scenes from Gopalakrishnan's notable films.

== Making ==
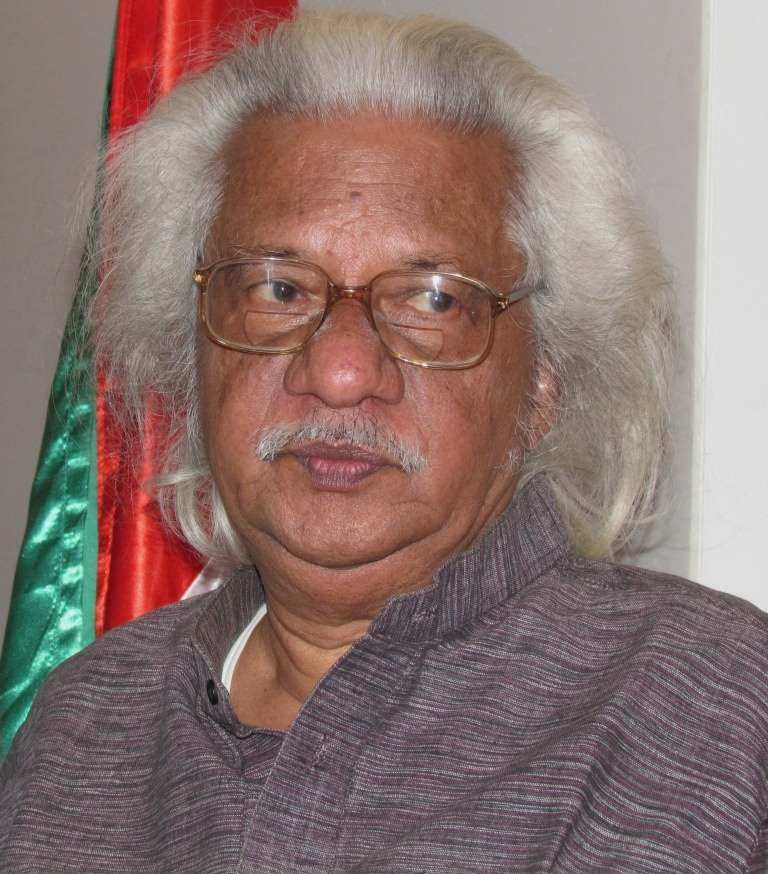
Adoor Gopalakrishnan

Films Division of India wanted to make a documentary on Adoor Gopalakrishnan and Girish Kasaravalli was asked to direct the film. It took more than a year to complete the shooting of the film. Many of the scenes were shot at Gopalakrishnan's house and in the places where Gopalakrishnan himself shot his movies. Kasaravalli commented on the movie title and film designing:

The documentary is titled Images/Reflections. It is Adoor's images and my reflections or my images through the reflection of Adoor's images. I thought of creating a narrative using Adoor's images rearranged in my way--the compositions, the sound design, music, the pacing, etc. So, while I was writing the structure for my movie, it suddenly occurred to me that dividing the film into five parts, each one named after his movies, would bring out my intentions clearly.

== Screening ==
The making of the documentary was completed in March 2015. On 13 April 2015, it was first screened in Bangalore, India.
