= Niruttara =

- Directed by: Apoorva Kasaravalli
- Screenplay by: Apoorva Kasaravalli
- Story by: Vikram Hathwar
- Produced by: Bhavana; Aravind Ramanna
- Starring: Rahul Bose; Kiran Srinivas; Bhavana; Aindrita Ray
- Cinematography: H. M. Ramachandra
- Edited by: Mohan Kamakshi
- Music by: Niladri Kumar
- Production company: Hometown Productions
- Release date: 23 December 2016
- Country: India
- Language: Kannada

Niruttara (transl. Having no superior/unanswerable) is a 2016 Indian Kannada romantic drama film written & directed by Apoorva Kasaravalli, making his debut, and produced by actress Bhavana and Aravind Ramanna. The film revolves around four main characters played by Rahul Bose, in his debut Kannada film, Bhavana, Kiran Srinivas and Aindrita Ray. The film's soundtrack and score is composed by Niladri Kumar, a classical musician making his film debut. Whilst the cinematography is by H. M. Ramachandra, the sound design is by the Academy Award winner Resul Pookutty, making his debut in Kannada films.

The plot revolves around the four characters about their relationships and journeys presented as an episodic catalogue.

== Cast ==
- Rahul Bose as Pradeep
- Bhavana as Hamsa
- Kiran Srinivas as Achinth
- Aindrita Ray as Shravya

== Soundtrack ==
The film's score and soundtrack is composed by Pandit Niladri Kumar who is best known as a sitar player in Indian classical and fusion music. The album is distributed by Lahari Music.

All lyrics are written by Kaviraj.

| No. | Title | Singers | Length |
|---|---|---|---|
| 1. | "Aigiri Nandini" | Arjun Nair |
| 2. | "Hoo Mele Hani" | Junne Bannerji, Savani Mudgal |
| 3. | "Neenilla Nanna Yedeyali" | Mohan |
| 4. | "Neenene Hosa Kanasu" | Jonita Gandhi |
| 5. | "Aaha Identha" | Balachandra Prabhu |
| 6. | "Aalangisu Baa Nannanu" | Balachandra Prabhu, Jonita Gandhi |
| 7. | "More Piya" | Ankitha |
