= 9th Bengaluru International Film Festival 2017 =

- Location: Bengaluru, Karnataka India
- Founded: 2006
- Awards: Special Jury Award ()
- No. of films: 240 films
- Festival date: 2–9 February 2017
- Website: Official website

Bengaluru International Film Festival chronology
- 10th 8th

9th Bengaluru International Film Festival 2017 (BIFFES 2017) was inaugurated by former Chief Minister of Karnataka, Siddaramaiah on 2 February 2017 in Bengaluru. A total of 240 films from 60 countries including Oscar nominees of the year such as The Salesman by Iranian director Asghar Farhadi and A Man Called Ove by Swedish director Hannes Holm were screened from 2 February to 9 February 2017.

== Asian cinema competition ==
Film name	Director	Language	Country	Winner	References
A Father's Will	Bakyt Mukul, Dastan Zhapar Uulu	Kyrgyz	Kyrgyzstan	Best film - A Father's Will	
A House on 41st Street	Hamid Ghorbani, Hamid Reza Ghorbani	Persian	Iran	Best film - A Father's Will	
By the Time It Gets Dark	Anocha Suwichakornpong	Thai	Thailand	Best film - A Father's Will	
Destiny	Zhang Wei	Chinese	China	Best film - A Father's Will	
Four Chinese Poems	Cui Ren	Mandarin	China	Best film - A Father's Will	
Land of the Little People	Yaniv Berman	Hebrew	Israel	Best film - A Father's Will	
Letters from Prague	Angga Dwimas Sasongko	Indonesian	Indonesia	Best film - A Father's Will	
Light Arose	Chathra Weeraman, Baratha Gihan Hettiarachchi	Sinhala	Sri Lanka	Best film - A Father's Will	
Lost Daughter	Jacob Chen	Mandarin	Taiwan	Best film - A Father's Will	
Red Butterfly Dream	Priyantha Kaluarachchi	Tamil	Sri Lanka	Best film - A Father's Will	
The Narrow Path	Satish Babusenan	Malayalam	India	Best film - A Father's Will	
The Road to Mandalay	Midi Z	Mandarin	Taiwan	Best film - A Father's Will	
U Turn	Pawan Kumar	Kannada	India	Best film - A Father's Will	
Wihite Blessing	Sengedorg Chanchivdorg	Mongolian	Mongolia	Best film - A Father's Will	

== Indian cinema competition ==
Film name	Director	Language	Winner	References
Chronicles Of Hari	Ananya Kasaravalli	Kannada	Best film - Chronicles Of Hari	
K Sera Sera	Rajeev Shinde	Konkani	Best film - Chronicles Of Hari	
Lady Of The Lake	Haobam Paban Kumar	Manipuri	Best film - Chronicles Of Hari	
Lathe Joshi	Mangesh Joshi	Marathi	Best film - Chronicles Of Hari	
Maj Rati Keteki	Santwana Bordoloi	Assamese	Best film - Chronicles Of Hari	
Revelations	Vijay Jayapal	Tamil	Best film - Chronicles Of Hari	
Search for the Self	G. Prabha	Sanskrit	Best film - Chronicles Of Hari	
The Golden Wing	Bobby Sarma Baruah	Rajbangshi	Best film - Chronicles Of Hari	
Kalichaat	Sudhanshu Sharma	Hindi	Best film - Chronicles Of Hari	
Chitrokar	Saibal Mitra	Bengali	Best film - Chronicles Of Hari	
Ekk Albela	Shekhar Sartandel	Marathi	Best film - Chronicles Of Hari	
Kaasav	Sumitra Bhave	Marathi	Best film - Chronicles Of Hari	
Kaadu Pookkunna Neram	Dr. Biju	Malayalam	Best film - Chronicles Of Hari	

== Kannada cinema competition ==
Film name	Director	Winner	References
6/3	R Mahantesh	Best film - Rama Rama Re...	
Actor	Dayal Padmanabhan	Best film - Rama Rama Re...	
Kandhaa	Solomon K George	Best film - Rama Rama Re...	
Kahi	Arvind Sastry	Best film - Rama Rama Re...	
Dhvani	Sebastin David	Best film - Rama Rama Re...	
Rama Rama Re...	D. Satya Prakash	Best film - Rama Rama Re...	
Kiragoorina Gayyaligalu	Sumana Kittur	Best film - Rama Rama Re...	
Uppina Kagada	B. Suresha	Best film - Rama Rama Re...	
Alemariya Aatmakathe	Amaradeva	Best film - Rama Rama Re...	
Bekku	Baragur Ramachandrappa	Best film - Rama Rama Re...	
Pallata	Raghu S P	Best film - Rama Rama Re...	
Godhi Banna Sadharana Mykattu	Hemanth M. Rao	Best film - Rama Rama Re...	

== Kannada Popular Entertainment ==
Award	Film	Result	References
Popular Kannada Cinema	Kotigobba 2	1st	
Popular Kannada Cinema	Jaggu Dada	2nd	
Popular Kannada Cinema	Doddmane Hudga	3rd	

== Jury Mention Award ==
Film name	Director	Producer	Country	Language	References
Kaadu Pookkunna Neram	Dr. Biju	Sophia Paul	India	Malayalam	

== FIPRESCI Critics Award ==
Film name	Director	Producer	Country	Language	References
Lady of the Lake	Haoban Paban Kumar	Oli Pictures	India	Manipuri	

== Jury Award for Kannada Cinema ==
Film name	Director	Producer	Country	Language	References
Uppina Kagada	B. Suresha	Shylaja Nag, B. Suresha	India	Kannada	

== Jury Special Award ==
Film name	Director	Producer	Country	Language	References
Lathe Joshi	Mangesh Joshi	Amol Kagne, Sonali Joshi	India	Marathi	
