= Love Li =

2024 film

- Theatrical release poster
- Directed by: Chetan Keshav
- Written by: Chetan Keshav
- Produced by: Ravindra Kumar
- Starring: Vasishta N. Simha; Stefy Patel
- Cinematography: Ashwin Kennedy
- Edited by: Harish Komme
- Music by: J. Anoop Seelin
- Production company: Abhuvanasa creations
- Release date: 14 June 2024
- Country: India
- Language: Kannada
- Budget: ₹10 crore

Love Li is a 2024 Indian Kannada-language romantic action film directed by Chetan Keshav and produced by Ravindra Kumar under Abhuvanasa Creations. The film stars Vasishta N. Simha, Stefy Patel, Achyuth Kumar, Malavika Avinash, Sadhu Kokila, Sameeksha and Kavya Shetty. The music was composed by J. Anoop Seelin, while cinematography and editing were handled by Ashwin Kennedy and Harish Komme.

Love Li was theatrically released on 14 June 2024 to mixed reviews from critics.

== Plot ==
Jai, an ex-gangster, works as a key man in a fashion designing company and leads a peaceful life with his wife Janani and daughter Thanu. However, things takes a turn when Jai learns that Janani has been infected with HIV by Krimuhi, a psychopath. Jai takes care of Janani by taking her for treatment in London, while also hunting down Krimuhi. Jai tracks down Krimuhi and brutally kills him, while Janani recovers from the disease. Janani learns about Jai's hardships to cure her, where they resume their peaceful life.

== Cast ==
- Vasishta N. Simha as Jai
- Stefy Patel as Janani
- Achyuth Kumar as Dr. Kumar
- Malavika Avinash as Dr. Shashikala
- Sadhu Kokila as A. K. Boss
- Sameeksha as Siri
- Cockroach Sudhir as Sudi
- H. G. Dattatreya as Lucky
- Kavya Shetty as Kavya
- Vanshika as Tanu

== Release ==
The film's trailer was released on 2 June 2024 by Rishab Shetty and it was promoted digitally by Digital Magnet Media. The film was released on 14 June 2024, clashing with Kotee.

== Reception ==
Vinay Lokesh of The Times of Indian said that “Love Li has a familiar story filled with love, sentiment, and action but falters in execution. The narration fails to lift the formulaic plot, which is marred by a shallow storyline lacking depth. The film predominantly revolves around Jai and Janani’s life, making it predictable and testing the audience’s patience.”
