= Akki Chennabasappa =

Indian actor

- Occupation: Actor

Akki Chennabasappa or (Akki Channabasappa) was an actor, known for the Kannada movie Humble Politician Nograj.

== Early life ==
He was born to the couple Rudrappa Akki and Thayavva Akki and spent his childhood in Ramdurg of Belagavi district. He joined the Ballari Lalithamma Drama Company at the age of 20 years before leaving for the Honnappa Bhagavathar company. In 1970 he left for the Gubbi Company and learnt dance from Kalpana, who was called Minugu Taare.

== Personal life ==
He was married to Balanagamma and the couple had no children.

== Filmography ==
Serials

- Ninnolumeyindale as Kiri Kiri Manja
- Silli Lalli

Movies

- Prakruthi
- See You
- Kanasemba Kudureyanneri
- Jipuna Nanna Ganda
- Mussanje
- Humble Politician Nograj

== Recognition ==
- Akki Chennabasappa was felicitated during the Actor Bharat Bhagavat Memorial Programme at KH Kala Soudha in Bengaluru on 4 November 2012.
- Akki Chennabasappa was felicitated on 30 August 2015 during Janapada Jenkhara Geetostva, Janapada Folks Songs 2015, organized by Saneeta Sangama Trust at Udayabanu Kala Sangha in Bengaluru.

== Death ==
Akki Chennabasappa died on 15 May 2018, in an old age home run by stage actor Ashok Basthi.
