= Nrupatunga Award =

Indian Kannada literary award

- Civilian award for contributions to Literature
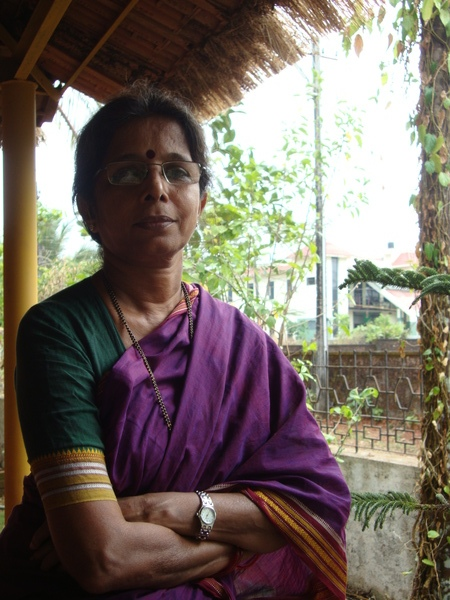
- 2022 winner Vaidehi
- Awarded for: Literary excellence award of Karnataka
- Sponsored by: Bangalore Metropolitan Transport Corporation
- Reward: ₹700,001
- First award: 2007
- Final award: 2022
- Most recent winner: Vaidehi

Highlights
- Total awarded: 16
- First winner: Javaregowda
- Recent winner: Vaidehi

The Nrupatunga Award is an award for excellence in Kannada literature in the Indian state of Karnataka. The award was instituted by the Kannada Sahitya Parishat and is sponsored by the Bangalore Metropolitan Transport Corporation (BMTC). Instituted in honor of the Rashtrakuta King Nrupatunga Amoghavarsha I (ruled c. 814–878), the award carries a purse of ₹700,001. King Nrupatunga finds an important place in the history of India in general and Karnataka in particular for his patronage and contribution to the Kannada language in the 9th century.

== List of awardees ==
Year	Image	Writer	Ref.
2007		Javaregowda	
2008	–	Patil Puttappa	
2009		G. S. Shivarudrappa	
2010		Devanur Mahadeva (Rejected by the author)	
2010		C. P. Krishnakumar	
2011		M. M. Kalburgi	
2012	–	Sara Aboobacker	
2013		Baraguru Ramachandrappa	
2014		Kum. Veerabhadrappa	
2015		T. V. Venkatachala Sastry	
2016	–	M. Chidananda Murthy	
2017		S. L. Bhyrappa	
2018		Siddalingaiah	
2019	–	Chennaveera Kanavi	
2020	–	G. S. Amur	
2021		Mallepuram G Venkatesh	
2022		Vaidehi	
