= Kotigobba 2 =

2016 Indian action film by K. S. Ravikumar

- Theatrical release poster in Kannada
- Directed by: K. S. Ravikumar
- Written by: K. S. Ravikumar; T. Sivakumar
- Produced by: M. B. Babu; Rockline Venkatesh
- Starring: Sudeepa; Nithya Menen
- Cinematography: Raja Rathinam
- Edited by: Praveen Antony
- Music by: D. Imman
- Production companies: Rockline Entertainments (Kannada); Rambabu Productions (Tamil)
- Distributed by: Rockline Entertainments
- Release dates: 11 August 2016 (Bangalore); 12 August 2016 (India, Malaysia and Singapore)
- Running time: 162 minutes (Kannada version); 156 minutes (Tamil version)
- Country: India
- Languages: Kannada; Tamil
- Budget: ₹20 crore
- Box office: ₹35.40 crore

Kotigobba 2 (transl. One in a crore 2) is a 2016 Indian action film directed by K. S. Ravikumar, who co-wrote the script with T. Sivakumar, and produced by Rockline Venkatesh and M. Babu. It is shot simultaneously in Kannada and Tamil languages, with Tamil version titled Mudinja Ivana Pudi (transl. Catch him if you can). The film stars Sudeepa, alongside Nithya Menen, P. Ravi Shankar, Nassar, Mukesh Tiwari, Sharath Lohitashwa and Prakash Raj. The music was composed by D. Imman, while the cinematography and editing were handled by Raja Rathinam and Praveen Antony. Despite the title, the film is not a sequel to the 2001 film Kotigobba and is a name sake sequel.

The Kannada-Tamil versions of the film was released on 12 August 2016 coinciding with the 2016 Varalakshmi Vrata, where it received positive reviews from critics and became a box office success. A sequel titled Kotigobba 3 was released on 2021 in which Sudeepa, Prakash Raj and P. Ravi Shankar reprise their roles from the previous film.

== Plot ==
Shiva and his accomplices loot ₹150 crore (US$16 million) from a rich businessman. Sathya, Shiva's real twin brother, works in the real-estate business. Sathya meets Subha, an upright girl, at an estate deal. Subha blackmails Sathya to hand over ₹2 lakh (US$2,100) or she will complain to the police as the people, who had paid the money for the estate deal, are actually cheated by the land owner. However, Subha had made Sathya to make a statement of giving the money if she gets cheated in the estate deal. Days pass by, Sathya returns the money to Subha and the people and Subha and Sathya fall for each other.

Meanwhile, the businessman appoints ACP Kishore, a no-nonsense corrupt officer, to search for the robber. After a brief investigation, Kishore interrogates Sathya, but gets stopped by DCP Sarathkumar and reveals that Sathya lodged a complaint against his fake twin brother Shiva, who has been torturing him and is also behind several robberies. Kishore suspects foul play and believes that Sathya also known as Shiva are the same person with fake twin, which is later revealed to be true. Sathya and his accomplices rob ₹120 crore (US$13 million) from another rich businessman by sneaking into the police station as drain cleaners and digging a tunnel to a factory, where the money is hidden.

The two businessmen become partners and send their henchmen to interrogate Sathya, who defeats them. Subha learns about his real identity and breaks up with him. Kishore tries to expose Sathya by a written complaint from the land owner (who was the one who cheated Sathya, but Sathya had masqueraded as Shiva and had blackmailed him to hand over the money), but to no avail. Sathya reveals his past and his desire for money to Subha, who understands his situation. Sathya tells that he decided to mend his ways for Subha, where she reunites with him. Later, the businessmen kidnap Sathya's accomplices and their families and call Sathya to hand over their money.

Sathya disguises himself as Shiva and calls the businessmen, where he saves the accomplices and their families by pretending to burn their money. At the hideout, Kishore finds Sathya, who makes a deal with Kishore to call the businessmen to arrange an attack on him and fake his death in exchange for ₹100 crore (US$11 million). As planned, Sathya fakes his death with Subha and Sarathkumar as the witnesses, where he later double-crosses Kishore in charges of killing Shiva and Kishore gets arrested. Sathya and Subha get married, but Sathya still continues his masquerade as Shiva to rob unaccounted money from corrupt businessmen, without Subha's knowledge.

== Cast ==
Cast (Kannada)	Cast (Tamil)	Role (Kannada)	Role (Tamil)
Sudeepa		Shiva "Sathya"	Shivam "Sathyam"
Nithya Menen		Subha "Subhashini"	Subha "Subhashini"
Ravi Shankar		ACP A. Kishore	ACP A. Kishore
Nassar		DCP Sharathkumar	DCP Sharathkumar
Prakash Raj		Sathya's father	Sathyam's father
Mukesh Tiwari		Rich Businessman	Rich Businessman
Sharath Lohitashwa		Rich Businessman	Rich Businessman
Chikkanna		Chikkanna	Saravana
Sathish		Sathya's friend	Sathish
Avinash		Land Owner	Land Owner
Tabla Nani		Bhaskar	Bus passenger
Imman Annachi		Bus passenger	Annachi
Devaraj	Delhi Ganesh	Orphanage Owner	Orphanage Owner
Achyuth Kumar		Subha's brother	Subha's brother
Latha Rao		Subha's sister-in-law	Subha's sister-in-law
Sadhu Kokila		Bus passengers	Bus passengers
C. Ranganathan		Bus passengers	Bus passengers
Veena Sundar		Bus passengers	Bus passengers
Visweswara Rao		Bus passengers	Bus passengers
Ravi Chethan	Siva Narayana Murthy	Police officer	Police officer
Kuri Prathap		Shop owners	Shop owners
Bank Janardhan		Shop owners	Shop owners
Mandeep Roy		Shop owners	Shop owners
Kovai Senthil		Shop owners	Shop owners
Scissor Manohar		Shop owners	Shop owners
K. S. Ravikumar		special appearance	special appearance

== Soundtrack ==
Kotigobba 2 / Mudinja Ivana Pudi

Soundtrack album by D. Imman
- Released: 5 August 2016
- Recorded: 2015–2016
- Genre: Feature film soundtrack
- Length: 25:46
- Languages: Kannada, Tamil
- Label: Anand Audio
- Producer: Soorappa Babu

D. Imman chronology
Marudhu (2016)	Kotigobba 2 / Mudinja Ivana Pudi (2016)	Wagah (2016)

D. Imman scored the soundtrack and score for the film. It is reported that actors Sudeepa and Nithya Menen lent their voices for a song written by V. Nagendra Prasad. The audio was officially released on 5 August 2016 and Anand Audio procured the music rights of the film. The project marked Imman's debut in Kannada cinema.

Kotigobba 2 track listing
No.	Title	Lyrics	Singer(s)	Length
1.	"Kotigobba"	V. Nagendra Prasad	Vijay Prakash	04:17
2.	"Saaluthillave"	V. Nagendra Prasad	Vijay Prakash, Shreya Ghoshal	04:10
3.	"Hunna Hunna"	V. Nagendra Prasad	Sudeepa, Shashaa Tirupati, Mc Rude	04:23
4.	"Hello Mister"	V. Nagendra Prasad	Neeti Mohan, Snigdha Chandra	04:25
5.	"Parapancha Neene"	V. Nagendra Prasad	Shankar Mahadevan	04:08
Total length:				25:46

Mudinja Ivana Pudi track listing
No.	Title	Singer(s)	Length
1.	"Essaalaama"	Vijay Prakash
2.	"Pothavilaye"	Shreya Ghoshal, Sakthi Amaran
3.	"Laama Laama"	Jithinraj, Shashaa Tirupati
4.	"Yaavum Neethane"	Sathya Prakash
5.	"Hello Mister"	Neeti Mohan, Snigdha Chandra

Kotikokkadu track listing
No.	Title	Lyrics	Singer(s)	Length
1.	"Chikkodamma Chikkodamma"	Vennelakanti	Hema Chandra	04:25
2.	"Hello Mister"	Rakendu Mouli	Pooja Vaidyanath	04:30
3.	"Mounamenduko"	Bhuvanachandra	Sathya Prakash, Pranavi	04:14
4.	"Daama Daama"	Rakendu Mouli	Deepak, Chinmayi	04:28
5.	"Anni Nuvvega"	Vennelakanti	Sathya Prakash	04:13
Total length:				21:50

== Release ==
Kotigobba 2 was released on 12 August 2016. The distribution rights of the movie were sold for 16 crores, the highest for any Kannada movie at that time. The Tamil version was dubbed into Telugu as Kotikokkadu (transl. One in a crore) and in Hindi under the same title as the Tamil version. The Telugu version will be presented by Lagadapati Srinivas.

=== Home media ===
The satellite rights of the Kannada version were sold to Udaya TV, while the Tamil and Telugu version were sold to Colors Tamil and Zee Telugu.

== Reception ==
=== Critical response ===
Shyam Prasad S of Bangalore Mirror gave 3.5/5 stars and wrote "This film will satisfy those looking to get entertained and keep a tab on getting back their money's worth." Sunayana Suresh of The Times of India gave 3.5/5 stars and wrote "This film is a treat for people who like to be entertained in with the traditional commercial masala fare, for Kotigobba 2 has ample spaces where fans can hoot and whistle." Shashiprasad SM of Deccan Chronicle gave 3.5/5 stars and wrote "Kotigobba 2 is a guaranteed fun filled experience, and is a must for Kiccha fans."

== Accolades ==
64th Filmfare Awards South:

- Best Actor In A Leading Role – Kannada – Nominated – Sudeepa

6th SIIMA:

- Best Film – Kannada – Won
- Best Comedian – Kannada – Nominated – Chikkanna

2nd IIFA Utsavam:

- Best Actor in a Comic Role - Won - Chikkanna

9th Bengaluru International Film Festival:

- Best Popular Film – Won

Edison Awards (India) 2017:

- Best Female Playback Singer - Won - Shreya Ghoshal for the song Pothavillaye

Mirchi Music Awards South 2017:

- Song of the Year - Won for the song Saaluthillave

Mirchi Music Awards South 2021:

- Song of the Decade – Won for the song Saaluthuillave
