= 7th Bengaluru International Film Festival 2014 =

Bengaluru International Film Festival
- Location: Bangalore, Karnataka India
- Language: International
- Website: http://biffes.in

7th Bengaluru International Film Festival 2014 (BIFFES 2014) was inaugurated by the honorable Chief Minister of Karnataka, Siddaramaiah on 4 December 2014 in Bengaluru. The film festival is showcasing 175 films from 45 countries in 11 screens across the City from 4 to 11 December.

== Participation ==
Bengaluru International film festival attracts people of all ages, Film industry people, students. Many of the colleges encouraged their students to participate or volunteer for the festival. Jain University, NMKRV College, St Joseph's College, Central College, National School of Drama's Bengaluru chapter are some of the institutes which actively participated in the festival with their mass communication students.

== Photo Exhibition ==
The seventh edition of Bengaluru International Film Festival (BIFFes), in association with Goethe-Institut/Max Mueller Bhavan, had organized a photo exhibition called Hybrid Modernisation - Movie Theatres in South India by Sabine Haubitz and Stefanie Zoche to provides a view of the surviving single screens in south India.

The exhibition talks about the current status of single-screen theaters in the south Indian region which includes the states Kerala, Tamil Nadu, Karnataka and Andhra Pradesh between 2010 and 2013.

Here is an extensive listing of the movies screened in BIFFES 2014.

== Asian cinema competition ==
No	Film Name	Director	Country
1	Asha Jadar Majhe (Labour of Love)	Aditya Vikram Sengupta	India
2	Dreamz - The Movie	Sumana Mukherjee	India
3	Swapaanam (The Voiding Soul)	Shaji N. Karun	India
4	Daughter (Dukhtar)	Afia Nathaniel	Pakistan
5	Ba Digaran (With Others)	Nasser Zamiri	Iran
6	Akash Koto Dure (The Distant Sky)	Samia Zaman	Bangladesh
7	Sakkarang	Dr. Dharmasena Pathiraja	Sri Lanka
8	Prakruti	Panchakshari	India
9	Aithihannu Mattu Kanaja (Fig Fruit And The Wasps)	MS Prakash Babu	India
10	The River of Colours	Shahneoyaj Cacoly	Bangladesh

== Indian cinema competition ==
Sl.#	Film Name	Director	Country	Language
1	Kranthidhara	Himansu Sekhar Khatua	India	Oriya
2	Yellow	Mahesh Limaye	India	Marathi
3	Ek Phaali Rodh	Atanu Ghosh	India	Bengali
4	Adomya	Bobby Sarma Baruah	India	Assamese
5	Pannaiyarum Padminiyum	S U Arun Kumar	India	Tamil
6	Kuttram Kadithal	Bramma G	India	Tamil
7	Alif	NK Muhammed Koya	India	Malayalam
8	Njaan	Ranjith	India	Malayalam
9	Unto the Dusk	Sajin Babu	India	Malayalam
10	Agasi Parlour(Salon by the fort entrance)	Mahantesh Ramdurg	India	Kannada
11	Munnariyippu	Venu	India	Malayalam

== Kannada competition ==
Sl. #	Film name	Director	Country
1	Prakruti	Panchakshari	India
2	Agasi Parlour	Mahantesh Ramdurg	India
3	Harivu	Manjunath S	India
4	Ulidavaru Kandanthe	Rakshit Shetty	India
5	Gajakesari	S Krishna	India
6	Hajj	Nikhil Manjoo	India
7	Ingale Marga	Vishal Raj	India
8	December - 1	P Sheshadri	India
9	Sachin Tendulkar Alla	S Mohan	India
10	Brahmashri Narayana Guru Swamy (tulu)	Shekhar R Kotyan	India

== Cinema of the world ==
No	Film Name	Director	Country
1	A Street In Palermo	Emma Dante	Italy
2	Ariane's Thread	Robert Guediguian	France
3	Brotherhood of Tears (LA CONFRERIE DES LARMES)	Jean-Baptisle Andrea	Belgium
4	Kidon	Emmanuel Naccache	Israel
5	Meetings with a Young Poet	Rudy Barichello	Canada
6	Now or Never (Maintenant ou jamais)	Serge Frydman	France
7	Vandal	Helier Cisterne	France
8	3X3D	Jean-Luc Godard, Peter Greenaway, Edgar Pêra	Portugal
9	Natural Sciences	Matias Lucchesi	Argentina
10	Stray Dogs (Jiao You)	Tsai Ming Liang	Taiwan
11	THE EMPTY HOURS (LAS HORAS MUERTAS)	Aaron Fernandez	Mexico
12	The Owners	Adilkhan Yerzhanov	Kazakhstan
13	Colette	MILAN CIESLAR	Slovakia
14	Mrs. Nergis (Nergis Hanim)	Gorkem Sarkan	Turkey
15	Taste of Poetry	Savas Baykal	Turkey
16	Overture (Uvertur)	Alpgiray M. Ugurlu	Turkey
17	Koltuk (The Sofa)	Meltem Parlak	Turkey
18	Yunus Emre Askin Sesi - Yunus Emre 'The Voice of Love'.	Kursat Kizbaz	Turkey
19	Les beaux jours (Bright Days Ahead)	Marion Vernoux	France
20	Gare du Nord	Claire Simon	France
21	Jappeloup	Christian Duguay	France
22	Michael Kohlhass	Arnaud des Pallières	France
23	Un château en Italie (A Castle in Italy)	Valeria Bruni Tedeschi	France
24	Violette	Martin Provost	France
25	Monument to Michael Jackson	Dark Lungulov	Serbia
26	Patchwork Family (Du goudron et des plumes)	Pascale Rabate	France
27	Ping Pong Summer	Michael Tully	USA
28	Trapped	PARVIZ SHAHBAZI	Iran
29	Norte, The End of History	Lav Diaz	Philippines
30	Son of Trauco	Alan Fischer	Chile
31	Summer (Zomer)	Colette Bothof	Netherlands
32	Unlikely Heros	Peter Luisi	Switzerland
33	The Fool	Yuriy Bykov	Russian
34	Melbourne	Nima javidi	Iran
35	Tales	Rakhshan Bani-Etemad	Iran
36	Hadji Sha	Ali Zamani Esmati	Iran
37	Marseille (Marsella)	Belen Macias	Spain
38	Behavior (Conducta)	Ernesto Daranas	Cuba
39	Refugiado	Diego Lerman	Argentina
40	Mr. Kaplan	Álvaro Brechner	Uruguay
41	The Blue Man	Utku Celik	Turkey
42	The Longest Distance (LA DISTANCIA MÁS LARGA)	Claudia Pinto	Venezuela
43	Lulu in the Nude ( Lulu, femme nue)	Sólveig Anspach	France
44	TIMBUKTU	Abderrahmane Sissako	Mauritania
45	Two Days one Night	Jean Pierre/Luc Dardenne	Belgium
46	Jimmy's Hall	Ken Loach	United Kingdom
47	The Search	Michel Hazanavicius	France
48	Coming Home	Zhang Yimou	China
49	Stations of the Cross	Dietrich Brüggemann	Germany
50	In Between Worlds	Feo Aladag	Germany
51	West	Christian Schwochow	Germany
52	Ms.Sixty	Sigrid Hoerner	Germany
53	Two Lives	Georg Maas, Judith Kaufmann	Germany
54	Omar	Hany Abu-Assad	Palestine
55	ZONE PRO SITE	CHEN Yu-Hsun	Taiwan
56	Juliets	HOU Chi-Jan, SHEN Ko-Shang, CHEN Yu-Hsun	Taiwan
57	The Lesson	Kristinagrozeva / Petar Valchanov	Bulgaria | Greece
58	Foreign Body	Krzysztof Zanussi	Poland
59	Field of Dogs	Lech Majewski	Poland
60	The Ambassador to Bern (A berni követ)	Attila Szász	Hungary
61	Illitrate (Las analfabetas)	Moisés Sepúlveda	Chile
62	Test	Aleksandr Kott	Russia
63	Fly, Dakota, Fly	Seiji Aburatani	Japan
64	Reunion	Ryoichi Kimizuka	Japan
65	Casting Blossoms to the Sky	Nobuhiko Obayashi	Japan
66	Of Horses and Men	Benedikt Erlingsson	Iceland

== Country focus ==
No	Film Name	Director	Country
1	Bedevilled	Jang Cheolsu Soo	South Korea
2	Don't Click	Kim Tae Kyoung	South Korea
3	Helpless	Byun Young Jo	South Korea
4	Pained	Kyung Taek Kwak	South Korea
5	THE CRUCIBLE (SILENCED)	Hwang Dong Hyeok	South Korea
6	Madly In Love (Smoor Verliefd)	Hilda Van Mieghem	Netherlands
7	Valentino	Remy Van Heuqten	Netherlands
8	Shocking Blue	Mark De Cloe	Netherlands
9	Love Is All (Alles is Liefde)	Joram Lursen	Netherlands
10	Life in One Day ( Het leven uit een dag )	Mark de Cloe	Netherlands
11	Tuscan Wedding	Johan Nijenhuis	Netherlands
12	Deal	Eddy Terstall	Netherlands

== Fipresci ==
No	Film Name	Director	Country
1	Ida	Pawel Pawlikowsk	Poland
2	Bad Hair	Mariano Randon	Venezuela
3	Winter Sleep	Nuri Bilge Ceylan	Turkey
4	The Ballad Of Poor Jean	Fellipe Barbosa	Brazil
5	No One's Child	Vuk Rsumovic	Serbia
6	Calvary	John Michael McDonagh	Ireland

== NETPAC ==
No	Film Name	Director	Country
1	Fish & Cat (Mahi va gorbeh)	Shahram Mokri	Iran
2	Night of Silence	Reis Çelik	Turkey
3	Shakespeare Must Die	Ing Kanjanavanit	Thailand
4	A Cradle For Mother	PANAHBARKHODA REZAEE	Iran
5	13 (Sizdah)	Hooman Seyadi	Iran
6	28	Prasanna Jayakody	Sri Lanka

== Retrospective ==
No	Film Name	Director	Country
1	Dead Calm	Phillip Noyce	Australia
2	Rabbit - Proof Fence	Phillip Noyce	Australia
3	Newsfront	Phillip Noyce	Australia
4	Backroads	Phillip Noyce	Australia
5	Constans	Krzysztof Zanussi	Poland
6	Persona Non grata	Krzysztof Zanussi	Poland
7	Life as a fatal STD	Krzysztof Zanussi	Poland
8	Camouflage	Krzysztof Zanussi	Poland
9	The Illumination	Krzysztof Zanussi	Poland
10	CWAL	Krzysztof Zanussi	Poland
11	Supplement	Krzysztof Zanussi	Poland

== Premier ==
No	Film Name	Director	Country
1	Devara Nadalli	B Suresha	India
2	Haggada Kone	Dayal Padmanabhan	India

== Gender violence ==
No	Film Name	Director	Country
1	Oblivion ( Difret)	Zersenay Berhane Mehari	Ethiopia
2	Mission Rape	Annette Mari Olsen & Katia Forbert Petersen	Denmark
3	Stoning of Soraya	Cyrus Nowrasteh	USA
4	The Paternal House	Kiandoosh Ayyari	Iran
5	Osama	Siddiq Barmak	Afghanistan
6	Magdalene Sisters	Peter Mullan	Ireland

== Homage ==
No	Film Name	Director	Country
1	Bara	MS Satyu	India
2	Maadi Madidavaru	K M Shakarappa	India
3	Kokila	Balu Mahendra	India
4	Life of Riley	Alain Resnais	France

== Special tribute ==
No	Film Name	Director	Country
1	U. R. Ananthamurthy: Not a biography, but a hypothesis	Girish Kasaravalli	India
2	Samskara	Pattabhirama Reddy	India
3	Ghatashraddha	Girish Kasaravalli	India
4	Avasthe	Krishna Masadi	India
5	Mouni	Lingadevaru	India

== Recommended screenings ==
No	Film Name	Director	Country
1	Ek Hazarachi Note	Shrihari Sathe	India
2	Zahir	Sidhartha Siva	India
3	A Rainy Day	Rajendra Talak	India
4	Raag - The Rhythm of Love	Rajni Basumatary	India
5	Gour Hari Dastan	Ananth Mahadevan	India
6	Kariya Kanbitta	Kavitha Lankesh	India
7	Chitramandiradalli	Venkatachala	India

== Centenary remembrance - Honnappa Baghavathar & Hunsur Krishnamurthy ==
No	Film Name	Director	Country
1	Jagajyothi Basaveshwara	T V Singh Thakore	India
2	Asha Sundari	Hunsur Krishnamurthy	India

== Texts for master classes ==
No	Film Name	Director	Country
1	Light of Asia (Prem Sanyas)	Franz Osten, Himansu Rai	India
2	Hatim Tai	Prafulla Ghosh	India
3	Shakespeare Wallah	James Ivory	India
4	Pyasa	Guru Dutt	India
5	Mayabazar	Kadri Venkata Reddy	India

== Grand classics ==
No	Film Name	Director	Country
1	Pépé le Moko	Julien Duvivier	France
2	Les enfants du paradis (Children of Paradise)	Marcel Carné	France
3	Casque d'Or	Jacques Becker	France
4	Pickpocket	Robert Bresson	France
5	Les yeux sans visage (Eyes without a face)	Georges Franju	France
6	Jour de Fete (The Big Day)	Jacques Tati	France

== Restored cinema ==
No	Film Name	Director	Country
1	Kasturi Nivasa	Dorai - Bhagwan	India
2	A Woman of Paris	Charlie Chaplin	USA
3	Limelight	Charlie Chaplin	USA
