= Ananya Kasaravalli =

Indian film actress

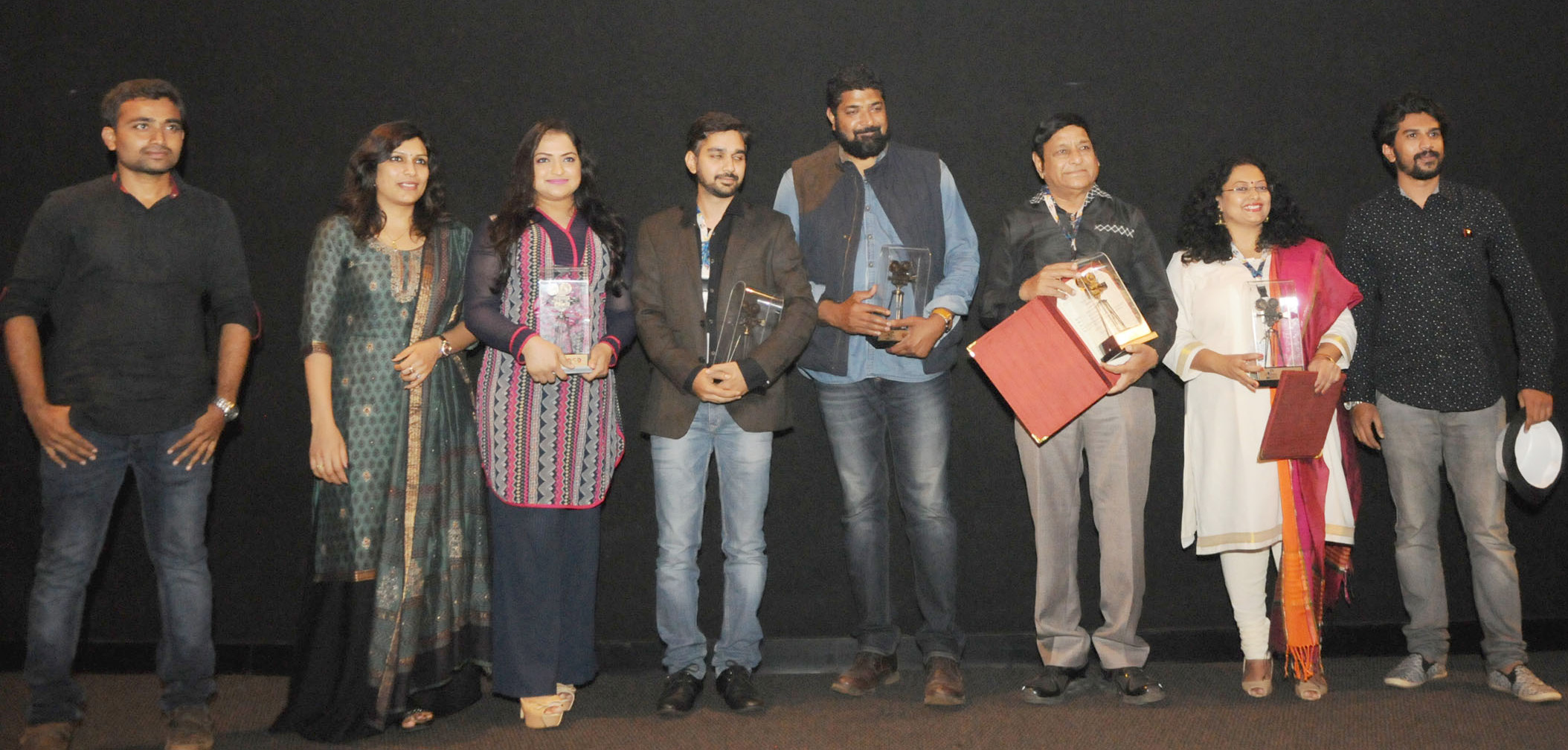
- Ananya Kasaravalli, IFFI (2016)
- Spouse: M.S. Santhosh
- Parents: Girish Kasaravalli (father); Vaishali Kasaravalli (mother)
- Relatives: Apurva Kasaravalli (brother)

Ananya Kasaravalli is an Indian actress and director in the Kannada film industry, and a theatre artist in Karnataka, India. Born into a family of filmmakers, she had a successful acting career in films, television and theater before taking up filmmaking at LV Prasad Film and TV Academy, Chennai.

Ananya's notable films as an actress include Kaada Beladingalu (2007) and Naayi Neralu (2006). Her debut directorial feature Harikatha Prasanga (2016) won the Best film in the Indian Cinema Competition section in the 9th Bengaluru International Film Festival.

== Career ==
Ananya started her career in the industry as an actress. She first appeared as a child actor in Goodininda Gaganakke, a tele-serial which aired on Doordarshan. She has since appeared in several films such as Naayi Neralu, Kaada Beladingalu as well as popular television serials like Guptagamini, Malebillu, among others. In addition to her work in films and TV, Ananya was also actively involved in several Kannada theatre productions.

Ananya took a hiatus from her acting career to pursue filmmaking. In 2014, she graduated from LV Prasad Film & TV Academy, Chennai with a master's degree in filmmaking. Ananya worked as an assistant director before helming her own productions. She began by assisting her father, Girish Kasaravalli, on his films, Naayi Neralu and Hasina. She also worked as an assistant director on Oggarane directed by Prakash Raj and Vidaaya directed by P Sheshadri. She was also the costume designer for Naayi Neralu and Koormavatara.

Ananya came into her own as a young director with short films like Wasiyat Nama, Beyond Binary (a documentary on transfeminity) and Kappu Kallina Shaitana. All of them have been highly acclaimed in festival circuits and have won several awards in the short film category.

In 2016, she directed her first feature film Harikatha Prasanga/Chronicles of Hari which was based on a short story named Beladi Harishchandra by writer Gopalakrishna Pai. Harikatha Prasanga won in the Best Film category at the Jaffna International Cinema Festival as well as the Best Film in the Indian Cinema Competition at the 9th Bengaluru International Film Festival. It competed for the Centenary Award (Best Debut Feature of a Director) at IFFI. It was also the first Kannada cinema to be selected for the Busan International Film Festival. The film was also screened at the Museum of Moving Image - MOMI New York, South Asian International Festival, Singapore and the Jio MAMI International Film Festival among several others.

Ananya is also an associate professor at her alma mater, LV Prasad Film & TV Academy, where she teaches a course in direction.

== Personal life ==
Ananya is the daughter of Girish Kasaravalli and Vaishali Kasaravalli, and sister of Apurva Kasaravalli. She is married to M S Santosh.

== Filmography ==
=== As actor ===
==== Films ====
Year	Film	Role	Notes
2006	Naayi Neralu	Rajalakshmi	
2006	Desi		
2007	Kaada Beladingalu	Sudeshne	
2010	Parole	Journalist	

==== Telefilms and Teleserials ====
Name	Role	Director	Notes
Goodininda Gaganakke			Child actor
Lakshmi Kataksha		Prema Karanth	
Kaveri Kangalalli	Kaveri	Bokkapatna Vasu	
Radha	Rukmini		
Guptagamini			
Muttina Torana	Madhu		
Malebillu	Soujanya		
Mooka Raaga	(Mute character)	Vaishali Kasaravalli	
Paaru	Counsellor		
Tripura Sundari	Eshwari	Vridhi Creations	
Chidambara Rahasya	Jayanthi	Girish Karnad	

==== Theatre ====
Play	Role	Director	Troupe
Hayavadana	Padmini	B V Karanth	Benaka
Jokumaraswamy	Ningi		Benaka
Mrichchakatika	Vasanta Sene	Suresh Anagalli	Aneka
Meghadoota		Suresh Anagalli	Aneka
Bhagavadajjukeeya		Sundarashree	
Ratto Ratto Rayana Magane		Srivatsa	

=== As director ===
Year	Film	Notes
2012	Wasiyat Nama, Beyond Binary	Short films
2014	Kappu Kallina Shaitana (Devil in the Black Stone)	Short films
2017	Harikatha Prasanga	

== Awards ==
Year	Film	Award	Category	Result	Ref
2014	Kappu Kallina Shaitana	Pune International Film Festival	Best Short Film	Won	
2014	Kappu Kallina Shaitana	Parampara International Film Festival	Best Film	Won	
2014	Kappu Kallina Shaitana	Kalapinjhar Kolkata	Best Short Fiction	Won	
2015	Wasiyat Nama	Chennai International Short Film Festival	Best Film, Best Director, Best Cinematography	Won	
2017	Harikatha Prasanga	Bengaluru International Film Festival	Best Film - Indian Film Competition	Won	
2017	Harikatha Prasanga	International Film Festival of India	Centenary Award - Best Debut Feature of a Director	Nominated	
2017	Harikatha Prasanga	Jaffna International Cinema Festival	Best Debut Feature Film	Won	
