= Kanasemba Kudureyaneri =

2010 film by Girish Kasaravalli

Kanasembo Kudureyaneri
- DVD cover
- ಕನಸೆಂಬೋ ಕುದುರೆಯನೇರಿ
- Directed by: Girish Kasaravalli
- Written by: Amaresh Nugadoni
- Screenplay by: Girish Kasaravalli; Gopalakrishna Pai
- Story by: Amaresh Nugadoni
- Based on: Savaari by Amaresh Nugadoni
- Produced by: Amrutha Patil; Basanth Kumar Patil
- Starring: Vaijanath Biradar; Umashree; Sadashiv Brahmavar
- Cinematography: H. M. Ramachandra Halkere
- Edited by: M. N. Swamy
- Music by: V. Manohar
- Distributed by: Basanth Productions
- Release date: 10 December 2010 (India)
- Running time: 104 minutes
- Country: India
- Language: Kannada

Kanasembo Kudureyaneri (Kannada: ಕನಸೆಂಬೋ ಕುದುರೆಯನೇರಿ, Riding a Stallion of a Dream) is a 2010 Indian Kannada language film directed by noted Kannada film director Girish Kasaravalli, based on an anthology of short stories written by Amaresh Nugadoni titled Savari, and starring Vaijanath Biradar, Umashree and Sadashiv Brahmavar in lead roles.

The film received positive reviews from the film critics upon release. It won several national and international awards. It won the National Film Award for Best Screenplay and the National Film Award for Best Feature Film in Kannada of 2010.

== Plot ==
A story has a beginning, middle and an end, but it's not necessary that they be in that order. Girish Kasarvalli's award-winning Kanasembo Kudureyaneri (based on Amaresh Nugadoni's Savaari) is a classic example of this.

The film applies a back and forth narrative to tell the story of gravedigger Irya and his belief in Siddhas, nomads whose arrival is considered auspicious. It is believed that if the death of a person coincides with the arrival of a Siddha, the soul is sure to go to heaven.

Irya and his wife are made known of their arrival through dreams. In fact for Irya, if a Siddha appears in his dream, it denotes a death in the village. However, once despite dreaming of a Siddha, Irya is told that there is no death in the village. He goes to the house of an ailing village elder, anticipating his death but is sent back by the caretaker saying all is well.

As if this is not enough, a Siddha not arriving in the village despite his wife having dreamt of his arrival, crushes Irya's faith in Siddhas, who he believes are his protectors. Is Irya an easy prey to superstitions or are scheming villagers exploiting his dreams for their own good?

The film exposes the materialistic attitude of people. It has been interpreted as questioning whether destroying one's beliefs is the only way to progress, and whether beliefs can be mistaken for superstitions just because the ones who hold them are not part of the mainstream.

While the first half of the film may have you raise your brows at Irya's and Rudri's dreams and faith, the second half sets out to suggest that what may look superstitious to one may be a way of life to the other. It also shows how sometimes what looks real may be unreal and vice versa, and that with faith in our beliefs, we can achieve anything.

== Cast ==
- Vaijanath Biradar as Irya
- Umashree as Rudri
- Sadashiv Brahmavar as Mathadayya
- Akki Chennabasappa as Gowda
- Shivaranjan as Shivanna
- Pavitra Lokesh
- Baby Soundarya
- Purushotthama Thalavata
- Basavalingaiah Hiremath

== Production ==
The film is based on a short story named "Savari", written by Amaresh Nudgoni. Produced by Basanthkumar Patil, the film was shot at locations in North Karnataka and featured mainly local actors from that region.

== Reception ==
=== Critical response ===
Shruti Indira Lakshminarayana of Rediff.com scored the film at 3.5 out of 5 stars and says "The performances are the other highlight of the film. Kasarvalli gets credit for bringing out the serious actor in comedian Biradar, who excels as Irya. Umashree sinks into the role of Rudri. Sadhashiva Bramhavar as the caretaker also comes out with a stellar performance. Great performances, thought provoking storyline and a different narrative make Kanasemba Kudureyaneri a must watch". A critic from The Times of India scored the film at 4.5 out of 5 stars and wrote "Biradar's performance is a classic case of how a comedian can give life to a serious character. Umashree is at her best. Pavithra Lokesh, Shivaranjan and Brahmavar are gracious. H M Ramachandra is amazing with his cinematography. Music by V Manohar is soothing to the ears". B S Srivani from Deccan Herald wrote "Best of all, Kanasemba... is another fine classroom lesson on filmmaking, including extracting of the best from the actors. To say anything else would render the whole exercise incomplete". Namrata Joshi from Outlook scored the film at 3.5 out of 5 stars and says "It’s the classic, rooted, humanist story-telling that has been the hallmark of erstwhile parallel cinema. KK grows on you with every viewing; the more you revisit it, the finer meanings you imbibe. Kasaravalli can make good cinema seem effortless".

== Awards ==
- 57th National Film Awards 2010
  - Best Screenplay (Adapted) - Girish Kasaravalli, Gopalakrishna Pai
  - Best Feature Film in Kannada
- Asiatica Film Mediale (Italy) 2010
  - NETPAC Award
