= Koormavatara =

- Directed by: Girish Kasaravalli
- Written by: Kum. Veerabhadrappa
- Screenplay by: Girish Kasaravalli
- Produced by: Basanthkumar Patil
- Starring: Dr. Shikaripura Krishnamurthy; Jayanthi; Apurva Kasaravalli
- Cinematography: G.S. Bhaskar
- Edited by: M. N. Swamy
- Music by: Isaac Thomas Kottukapally
- Production company: Basanth Productions
- Release date: 2011
- Running time: 133 minutes
- Country: India
- Language: Kannada

Koormavatara is a 2011 Indian Kannada drama film directed by Girish Kasaravalli, based on short story of the same name written by Kum. Veerabhadrappa. It stars Shikaripura Krishnamurthy, Jayanthi and Apoorva Kasaravalli in the lead roles, and Harish Raj, Cheswa, Rashmi Sumukha, Goa Dattu and Sumukha Bharadwaj feature in supporting roles. The story revolves around a government employee cast in a play to portray Mahatma Gandhi, who, on course, realizes that playing Gandhi is easier than imbibing and implementing his principles in real-life.

The film was screened in 17 film festivals and won acclaims Bangkok, New York and Vancouver. At the 59th National Film Awards, it was awarded the Best Feature Film in Kannada.

== Plot ==
Rao, who is at the edge of retirement from government service, happens to play the role of Mahatma Gandhi in a television serial. Unknowingly the qualities of Gandhiji imbibe in him.

== Cast ==
- Shikaripura Krishnamurthy as Anand Rao / Mahatma Gandhi
- Jayanthi as Susheela / Kasturba Gandhi
- Apoorva Kasaravalli as Chandan
- Harish Raj as Nathuram Godse
- Cheswa
- Rashmi Hariprasad
- Goa Dattu
- Praveen Rabakavi
- Sumukha Bharadwaj
- Vikram Soori as Iqbal
- Nanjunda
- H. G. Somashekar Rao
- Akki Chennabasappa
- Babu Hirannayya
- Bangalore Nagesh
- Radha Ramachandra

== Reception ==
=== Critical response ===
B S Srivani from Deccan Herald wrote "In Kanasemba Kudureyaneri, Kasaravalli had poked inside the psyche of the rural man while in “Kurmavataara” it is the suave urbanite who undergoes sharp scrutiny. But does it suffice for the moment?". A critic from Bangalore Mirror wrote "Veteran Jayanthi and Harish Raj, both playing actors and Kastura Ba and Nathuram Godse, deliver top-class performances. The film has been released in five screens in Bangalore and there is no reason to skip it. Indulge in some Gandhian duty".

== Awards ==
- National Film Award for Best Feature Film in Kannada
