= Inspector Vikram (2021 film) =

2021 Indian Kannada-language action film

- Theatrical release poster
- Directed by: Sri Narasimha
- Produced by: Vikhyath AR
- Starring: Prajwal Devaraj; Bhavana; Raghu Mukherjee
- Cinematography: I. Naveen Kumar
- Edited by: Harish Komme
- Music by: Anoop Seelin
- Production company: Vikhyath Chitra Productions
- Release date: 5 February 2021
- Country: India
- Language: Kannada

Inspector Vikram is a 2021 Indian Kannada-language action film directed by Narasimha and produced by Vikhyath AR. The film featuring Prajwal Devaraj, Raghu Mukherjee, Bhavana, Avinash, Shobhraj and Dharma, was released on 5 February 2021 to positive reviews for cast performances, action sequences, and entertainment value. The film was an ode to the 1989 comedy thriller of the same name.

== Plot ==
Inspector Vikram begins with the murder of popular journalist and editor of a TV News channel Arvind Aradhya who was about to break some explosive piece of a drug smuggler, but is murdered by the drug smuggler Prathap Mishra, who is also an ACP in Karnataka state police department. Vikram, a happy-go-lucky Sub Inspector with a sharp intellect to solve crimes.

Vikram is posted at Manipal to solve a drug racket where he meets Bhavana, who appears as a PA to a drug peddler Johnny, but is also an undercover officer and the daughter of police commissioner Prakash, and also Vikram's childhood friend Pinky. They manage to bust down Johnny and the drug peddlers, and they are arrested. Later, Vikram and Bhavana are sent to Bangalore to crack Aravind Aradhya's murder case, where Vikram deduces Prathap Mishra's identity.

Prathap Mishra holds Bhavana, along with Aradhya's daughter hostage, but is saved by Darshan, who was shooting for his film Roberrt and also was requested by Vikram to save them. Vikram defeats Prathap Mishra, gathers the evidence, and arrests him. Vikram and Bhavana are appreciated by the police department for solving the case. They get married and are assigned to investigate another case.

== Cast ==
- Prajwal Devaraj as Inspector Vikram
- Bhavana as Bhavana, an undercover officer
- Raghu Mukherjee as ACP Prathap Mishra
- Darshan as himself (extended cameo appearance)
- Dharamanna Kadur as Vikram's colleague
- Shobaraj as Johnny, a drug peddler and politician

== Soundtrack ==
No.	Title	Lyrics	Singer(s)	Length
1.	"Nannavale Nannavale"	Dhananjay Ranjan	Sonu Nigam, Anoop Seelin	05:04
2.	"Hey Guys"	Pramod Maravanthe	Anoop Seelin	04:10
3.	"Moolimani Muddesha"	Pramod Maravanthe	Anthony Daasan	03:36
Total length:				12:51

== Critical reception ==
It was a commercially successful movie.
