= Kalichaat =

- Film Poster
- Directed by: Sudhanshu Sharma
- Written by: Dr. Sunil Chaturvedi
- Produced by: Sudhanshu Sharma
- Starring: Prakash Deshmukh; Geetika Shyam; Virendra Kumar Nathenial
- Edited by: Jeetu Rall
- Music by: Sanjeev Kohli
- Release date: 2018
- Running time: 70 minutes
- Country: India
- Language: Hindi (with English subtitles)

Kalichaat is a 70-minute 2018 Indian feature film, set in the Malwa-Nimar region of Western Madhya Pradesh. It follows the hurdles of an Indian farmer in hopes of giving his family a better life. The story transforms into a labyrinth of complex government procedures and a system promoting hopelessness among the "providers of society" such as the farmer.

== Plot ==
The story revolves around Sitaram, a typical farmer in central India, seeking to provide for his family of five. Sitaram is faced with the difficulty of raising crops in the Indian monsoon climate. Despite his best efforts, Sitaram's field yields nothing but weeds. Sitaram's efforts to quench the thirst of his land lead him to dig a well. In the process of digging the well he strikes the dreadful black rock known as Kalichaat, and cracking Kalichaat and reaching water beneath will require measures beyond his means. To get the resources he needs, he approaches the local bank specifically established to meet the needs of farmers, only to realize that getting help there is even more complex than breaking Kalichaat. In his state of despair, the showering water pouring from a tube well drilling at his village makes him wonder why he cannot have one on his land. Sitaram clings to this hope, regardless of the doubt expressed by his wife and many others. Sitaram must combat authorities, loan sharks, and religious gurus if he has any hope of giving his family a better future.

== Cast ==
Prakash Deshmukh - Sitaram - A theater artist for 22 years with about 100 plays to his credit, Prakash also appeared in Prakash Jha's Satyagrah. His area of interest expands to film making and his short film 'Mard' achieved him the 'Jury Award' at Rising International Short Film Festival 2015. He made Sitaram's character natural with his deep understanding of Malwi along with culture of Malwa-Nimar region.

Geetika Shyam - Kala, Sitaram's Wife - A native of Indore, Geetika is a familiar face in theater circles of Central India. Besides being part of some major plays, she currently is spending most of her time acting in television serials and Hindi films. Her ability to speak with facial expressions made her an immediate choice for Sitaram's wife in Kalichaat.

Virendra Kumar Nathenial - Patwari - A theater artist for 33 years, Virendra worked with and got guidance from several Indian theater legends like Habib Tanvir, B. V. Karanth, M. K. Raina and the like. With over 400 showings of 40 plays in his repertoire, Virendra also worked in some films and television serials. His embodiment of ruthless Patwari in Kalichaat gave life to this menacing character.

Raut Jaywant Murlidhar - Directory of Photography - A very senior technician, Jaywant is part of Hindi and Marathi film industry for close to 35 years now. His work as Cameraman, Operative Cameraman, and DOP won him appreciation by industry stalwarts. Jaywant's experiments with sunlight, to bring out the dry aura of a drought-affected region in Kalichaat, are praiseworthy.

Sanjeev Kohli - Music Director - A music director, lyricist, and singer himself, Sanjeev is a well-known name in Hindi film industry. His special interest in creating devotional music has made him create some soul-soothing divine compositions. His work in Kalichaat with region-specific singers and musicians, singing Kabir's couplets, is inspiring.

Dr. Sunil Chaturvedi - Storywriter - 'Kalichaat,' the adapted title and the story itself, is borrowed from a short story of Dr. Sunil Chaturvedi's Novel by the same name. 'Kalichaat' is Dr. Chaturvedi's second novel after the critically acclaimed 'Mahamaya,' which had won him many awards, including the prestigious 'Vagheshwari' honor from Govt. of Madhya Pradesh. His detailed understanding of heritage and culture of the Malwa region makes his writing richer in terms of content authenticity; even in fictional work.

Dr. Sonal Sharma - Screenplay & Dialogues - Dr. Sonal is a published and appreciated poet for her thought-provoking work specifically dedicated to women empowerment. Her subtle and short poems beautifully narrate the lives and struggles of Indian women. Kalichaat is her debut project as a Screenplay and Dialogue writer, yet the way she converted a short story into a simple and easy-flowing narration is commendable.

Kaluram Bamania - Singer - Kaluram Bamania is a celebrated regional folk singer, who is known for his Kabir-inspired singing. His singing is true to the soil of Malwa, while the appeal of Kabir's poetry in his songs is global.

Jeetu Rall - Chief Editor - A young man with an incredible vision for the final product after seeing the raw footage for the first time. Jeetu's ability to foresee the desired outcome, which was in sync with Directors' imagination, ended up winning him many laurels at his young age.

Rudra & Shankar - Sound Engineers - Rapidly rising on the industry ladder with their distinctive work as a team of two, Rudra learned sound engineering from Toronto Film School while Shankar learned it from industry bigwigs and has already done many films as sound editor and designer.

Abhinav Aserkar - Visual Effects Artist

== Music ==
The songs were arranged by Sanjeev Kohli and sung by Kaluram Bamania and Team.

Kalichaat

Soundtrack album by Kaluram Bamania
- Genre: Kabir Folk
- Length: 28:01
- Language: Hindi
- Producer: Sudhanshu Sharma

Track listing
No.	Title	Singer(s)	Length
1.	"Ekla Mat Chhodjo"	Kaluram Bamania	7:27
2.	"Jara Halke Gadi Hako ""	Kaluram Bamania & Group	5:23
3.	"Jara Halke Gadi Hako (Gujrati Version)"	Kaluram Bamania	7:33
4.	"Mann Mast Hua"	Kaluram Bamania	8:18
