= Girish Kasaravalli =

Indian film director (born 1950)

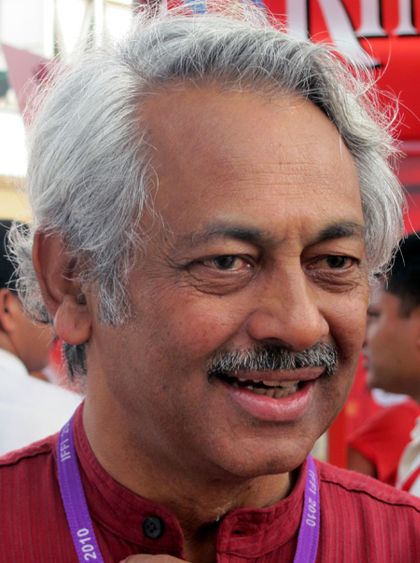
- Girish Kasaravalli in 2010
- Born: 3 December 1950 (age 75); Kesalur
- Occupations: Film director, producer, screenwriter
- Spouse: Vaishali (m. 1978; died 2010)
- Children: Apurva (son); Ananya (daughter)
- Awards: Padma Shri (2011)

Girish Kasaravalli (born 3 December 1950) is an Indian film director and screenwriter who works primarily the Kannada cinema. He is regarded as one of the pioneers of the Parallel Cinema. His films have received critical acclaim and he has received fourteen National Film Awards, National Film Awards, including four Best Feature Films: Ghatashraddha (1977), Tabarana Kathe (1986), Thaayi Saheba (1997) and Dweepa (2002). In 2011, he was awarded the Padma Shri, India's fourth-highest civilian honour.

A gold medalist from the Film and Television Institute of India, Pune, The film he made to fulfill his diploma, Avashesh, was awarded the Best Student Film and the National Film Award for Best Short Fiction Film for that year. He has received fourteen National Film Awards.

== Early life ==
Girish Kasaravalli was born in Kesalur, a village in the Tirthahalli taluk in Shimoga district on 3 December 1950 to Ganesh Rao, an agriculturist, as well as a freedom fighter, and Lakshmidevi, a homemaker, one of 10 children (five brothers and four sisters). He had his primary education in Kesalur and middle school education in Kammaradi. Hailing from a family of book lovers, he was initiated to reading from a young age by his father. His father was a patron of Yakshagana, a folk system of dance native to Karnataka.

He was attracted to the touring talkies which visited his village once in a while to screen popular Kannada films. This was his first exposure to the world of cinema. Another relative who supported his love for creative arts was his maternal uncle K.V.Subbanna, a Magsaysay award winner who founded Neenasam, a critically acclaimed and popular drama company.

He shifted to Shimoga where he graduated from Sahyadri College. College was transformative for Kasaravalli as poets G S Shivarudrappa and Sa Shi Marulaiah were his Kannada teachers. He then enrolled for the B.Pharma course in the College of Pharmacy, Manipal. The college was a common place for many cultural activities and kept Kasaravalli's creative interests alive. After completing his degree, he went to Hyderabad for training. But, due to his pre-occupations in cinema and art, he found it difficult to manage his profession and interest together. He decided to quit the career in Pharmacy and join the Film and Television Institute of India (FTII), Pune.

== Career ==
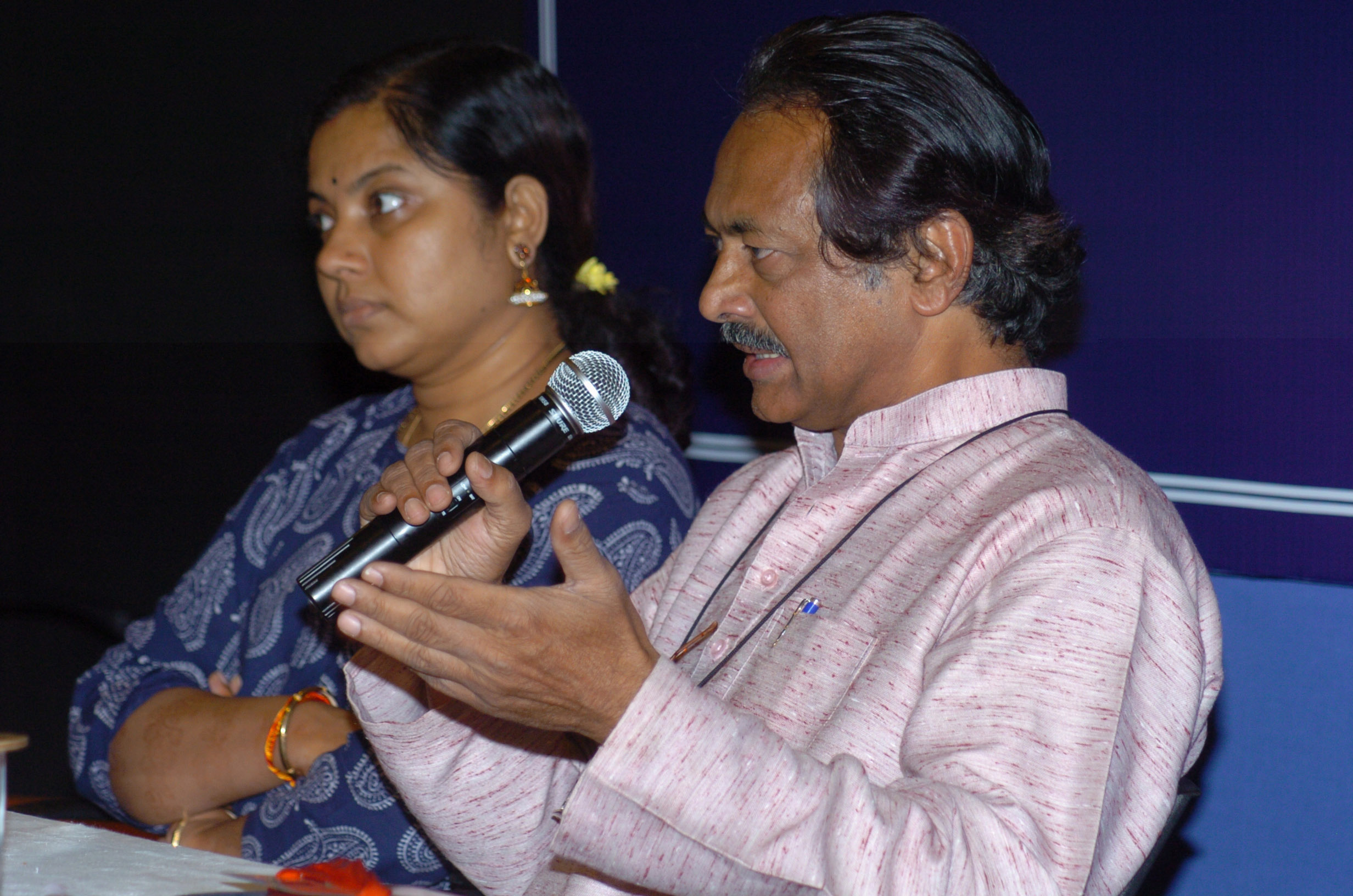
Kasaravalli (right) with Tara (left) at a press conference in IFFI (2005)

Kasaravalli graduated from FTII Pune in 1975, with a specialisation in film direction. The world of Kurosawa, Ray, Ozu, Fellini and Antonioni inspired him, and his conviction in neo-realist cinema deepened. In an interview many years later, he recollected how he was inspired by these filmmakers, especially Ozu. While in his final year, he was chosen to be the assistant director for B. V. Karanth for the film Chomana Dudi. He passed out of the FTII with a gold medal to his credit. His student film Avasesh won the President's Silver Lotus award for the best experimental short film of the year.

His first film as an independent director was Ghatashraddha in 1977; it won him the Golden Lotus and a few international awards. This film was followed by many more masterpieces. For a short while, he served as the principal of a film institute in Bangalore.

He has worked as associate director for T. S. Nagabharana's Grahana movie during 1981 He won his second Golden Lotus for Tabarana Kathe in 1987. Considered one of the best edited films in India, it deals with the futile efforts of a retired government servant to earn his pension. In 1997, he came up with another masterpiece, Thaayi Saheba which won him his third Golden Lotus award. Thaayi Saheba is considered to be the most mature work of the director, dealing with the transition in the Indian society from the pre- to the post-independence periods.

The narrative structure was unique, and it had a powerful way of depicting a social situation. He repeated his success with Dweepa in 2002 starring late actress Soundarya. It won his fourth Golden Lotus award. Dweepa was different from his earlier films: It used music extensively and was visually stunning. Apart from these four films winning Golden Lotus awards, Kasaravalli directed Akramana in 1979, Mooru darigalu in 1981, Bannada Vesha in 1988, Mane in 1990, Kraurya in 1996, Hasina in 2004 and Naayi Neralu in 2006.

Naayi Neralu dealt with a very intense and bizarre concept of reincarnation, based on the novel with the same name by S.L. Bhyrappa. Kasaravalli has given a different interpretation of the subject. It won the Best Film award at KARA film festival, Karachi thus making it the first ever Kannada film to win the top honour in any international festival.

In 2008 he directed Gulabi Talkies based on a short story of the same name by Vaidehi. It was shown in many international film festivals, winning awards and accolades. In 2010, he made Kanasemba Kudureyaneri (Riding the Stallion of Dreams) which, too, won him many international awards. He has finished his Koormavatara (The Tortoise, an Incarnation) which won the National film award for the best Kannada film of 2011. In 2015 he made a documentary film on Adoor Gopalakrishnan named Images/Reflections.

The International Film Festival of Rotterdam held a retrospective of Kasaravalli's films in 2003. In August 2017, the Entertainment Society of Goa organized a film festival in Goa in his honour.

== Personal life ==
Kasaravalli married actress Vaishali on 21 April 1978. They have two children: son Apoorva and daughter Ananya. Vaishali died of illness in 2010, aged 59.

Kasaravalli has cited the works of K. Shivaram Karanth, Kuvempu and U. R. Ananthamurthy as influences.

== Filmography ==
| Year | Film | Functioned as | | Notes |
| Year | Film | Director | Screenplay | Notes |
|---|---|---|---|---|
| 1977 | Ghatashraddha | Yes | Yes | National Film Award for Best Feature Film |
| 1979 | Akramana | Yes | No | |
| 1981 | Mooru Darigalu | Yes | Yes | |
| 1987 | Tabarana Kathe | Yes | Yes | National Film Award for Best Feature Film |
| 1988 | Bannada Vesha | Yes | Yes | National Film Award for Best Feature Film in Kannada |
| 1990 | Mane | Yes | Yes | National Film Award for Best Feature Film in Kannada |
| 1991 | Ek Ghar | Yes | Yes | Hindi film |
| 1992 | Kubi Matthu Iyala | No | Yes | Screenplay and Dialogues only |
| 1996 | Kraurya | Yes | Yes | National Film Award for Best Feature Film in Kannada |
| 1997 | Thaayi Saheba | Yes | Yes | National Film Award for Best Feature Film |
| 2002 | Dweepa | Yes | Yes | National Film Award for Best Feature Film |
| 2003 | Grihabhanga | Yes | Yes | Tele Series |
| 2004 | Hasina | Yes | Yes | National Film Award for Best Costumes; National Film Award for Best Film on Social Issues; Karnataka State Award for Best Film on Social Issues |
| 2006 | Naayi Neralu | Yes | Yes | |
| 2008 | Gulabi Talkies | Yes | Yes | National Film Award for Best Feature Film in Kannada |
| 2010 | Kanasemba Kudureyaneri | Yes | Yes | National Film Award for Best Screenplay |
| 2012 | Koormavatara | Yes | Yes | National Film Award for Best Feature Film in Kannada |
| 2016 | Harikatha Prasanga | No | Yes | |
| 2020 | Illiralare Allige Hogalare | Yes | Yes | |
| 2024 | Akasha Mattu Bekku | Yes | Yes | |
