= Apurva Kasaravalli =

Indian film actor and director

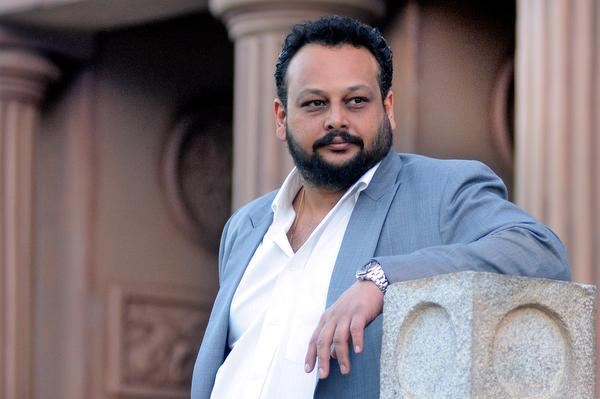
- Kasaravalli in 2012
- Education: University Of Technology, Sydney, Australia
- Occupations: Filmmaker, businessman
- Years active: 2000 - present
- Spouse: Vandana Supriya Kasaravalli
- Parents: Girish Kasaravalli (father); Vaishali Kasaravalli (mother)
- Relatives: Ananya Kasaravalli (sister)

Apurva Kasaravalli or Apoorva Kasaravalli is an Indian businessman, actor and filmmaker known for his work in Kannada cinema.

== Career ==
He worked as an assistant director for his father's Dweepa (2001).

== Personal life ==
Apurva is the son of Girish Kasaravalli and Vaishali Kasaravalli, and brother of Ananya Kasaravalli. He studied at Christ University and did his master's degree from University of Technology, Sydney, Australia. He is married to Vandana Supriya, who is an Odissi performer and choreographer.

Apurva and Vandana run an NGO called "Anandi Arts Foundation" that works with children from underprivileged backgrounds. They also organise a yearly event called ′Asmi′ at Ravindra Kalakshetra, in which renowned musicians and dancers perform.

== Selected filmography ==
Year	Title	Credited as		Language
Year	Title	Director	Writer	Language
2003	Freaky Chakra		Screenplay	English
2016	Niruttara	Yes	Screenplay	Kannada

As an actor

Year	Title	Role
2011	Aidondla Aidu	
2011	Koormavatara	Chandan
2022	Guru Shishyaru	Rudrappa
