= Vaidehi (Kannada writer) =

Indian writer (born 1945)

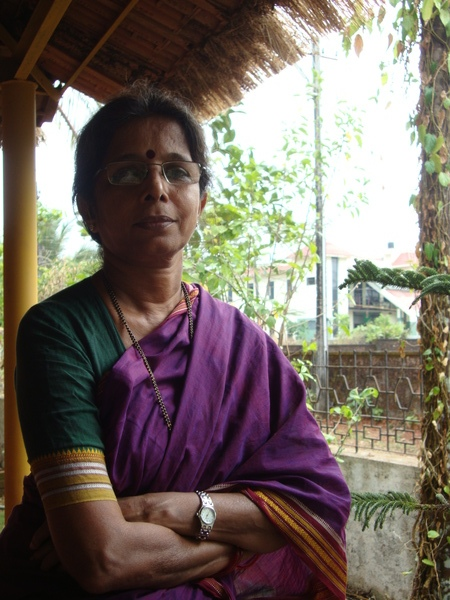
- Born: Vasanti; 12 February 1945 (age 81); Kundapur, Udupi, Karnataka, British India
- Occupation: Writer
- Spouse: K.L. Srinivasa Murthy
- Children: 2
- Writing career
- Pen name: Vaidehi
- Genre: Kannada fiction
- Notable awards: Sahitya Akademi Award; 2009

Janaki Srinivasa Murthy (born 12 February 1945), popularly known by her penname Vaidehi, is an Indian feminist writer and well-known writer of modern Kannada language fiction. Vaidehi is one of the most successful women writers in the language and a recipient of prestigious national and state-level literary awards. She has won the Sahitya Akademi Award for her collection of short stories, Krauncha Pakshigalu in 2009.

== Biography ==
=== Early life ===
Vaidehi was born on 12 February 1945 to A. V. N. Hebbar (father) and Mahalakshmi (mother) in Kundapura taluk of Udupi district, Karnataka. She grew up in a large traditional Brahmin family. She graduated with a bachelor's degree in Commerce from the Bhandarkar College in Kundapura. Her father is a lawyer and her mother was a homemaker. At home, a dialect of Kannada called Kundapur Kannada is spoken and she uses this dialect in her works as well. Vaidehi became her pen-name under unusual circumstances. Early in her writing career, she had sent a story to the Kannada weekly magazine Sudha for publication but later requested the publisher not to go ahead with the print as the story was non-fictional and included a real-life story. However, the editor went ahead with the publication by changing the author's name to 'Vaidehi'. This name stuck in her later writings as well as she gained popularity.

=== Married life ===
Vaidehi married K. L. Srinivasa Murthy at the age of 23. The couple has two daughters, Nayana Kashyap and Pallavi Rao. After marriage Vaidehi moved to Shivamogga. The family later moved to Udupi and then to Manipal, where they currently live. Vaidehi's daughter Nayana Kashyap is a translator, Kannada writer and English teacher. She has translated some of the Vaidehi's works into English including five novels.

== Works ==
=== Collection of short stories ===
- Mara Gida Balli (1979)
- Antharangada Putagalu (1984)
- Gola (1986)
- Samaja Shastrajneya Tippanige (1991)
- hagga Kate (1992)
- Ammacchi Yemba Nenapu (2000)
- Hagalu Geechida Nenta
- Krouncha Pakshigalu

Beautiful essays

- Mallinathana Dhyana (1996)
- Meju Mattu Badagi
- Jatre

=== Novels ===
- Asprushyaru (1992)

=== Collection of poems ===
- tottilu tuguva hadu
- Bindu Bindige (1990)
- Parijatha (1999)
- Hoova Kattuva Haadu (2011)

=== Children's dramas ===
- Dham Dhoom Suntaragali
- Mookana Makkalu
- Gombe Macbeth
- Danadangura
- Nayimari Nataka
- Kotu Gumma
- Jhum Jham Aane Mathu Putta
- Surya Banda
- Ardhachandra Mitayi
- Hakki Haadu
- Somari Olya

=== Biography ===
- Nenapinangaladalli Mussanjehothu (life of Kota Lakshminarayana Karanth)
- Sediyapu Nenapugalu - (life of Sediyapu Krishna Bhatta)
- Illiralare allige hogalare - (life of B. V. Karanth)

=== Translations ===
- Bharathiya Mahileyara Swathanthra Horata (from Kamaladevi Chattopadhyaya's "Indian women's freedom struggle")
- Belliya Sankolegalu (from Maithreyi Mukkhopadhyaya's "Silver Shakles")
- Surya Kinnariyau (from Swapna Dutta's "Sun Fairies")
- Sangeetha Samvada (from Bhaskar Chandavarkar's "Lecture on Music")

== Awards ==
Vaidehi has won numerous awards for her writings in Kannada.

- Nrupatunga Award (2022)
- Sahitya Akademi Award (2009) for Krouncha Pakshigalu
- Geetha Desai Datti Nidhi (1985, 1992) by Karnataka Lekhakiyara Sangha for Antharangada Putagalu and Bindu Bindige
- Vardhamana Udayonmukha Award (1992) by Vardhamana Prashasti Peetha for Gola
- Katha Award (1992, 1997) by Katha Organisation, New Delhi for Hagalu Geechida Nenta and Ammacchiyemba Nenapu
- Anupama Award (1993) for Samaja Shastrajneya Tippanige
- Karnataka State Sahitya Akademi Award (1993, 1998) for her five children's dramas and Mallinathana Dhyana
- Sahtya Kama Award for Ammachi Yemba Nenapu
- Sadodita Award (2001) by Shashwathi Trust
- Sudha Weekly Award for Asprushyaru
- Daana Chintamani Attimabbe Award in 1997 by Government of Karnataka
- Attimabbe Award by Attimabbe Pratishtan

== See also ==
- List of Indian writers
