= Bengaluru International Film Festival =

Film festival in Bengaluru, India

- Location: Bengaluru, Karnataka India
- Language: International
- Website: https://biffes.org

The Bengaluru International Film Festival, is an annual film festival held in Bengaluru, the capital of the Indian state of Karnataka, which previews films of all genres, including documentaries from around the world. Founded in 1996, Suchitra Bangalore International Film Festival, was held for a week from 22 to 28 December 2006 in collaboration with Suchitra Film Society. More than 100 films were screened during festival.

The film festival is now being organized by Karnataka Chalanachitra Academy and is supported by Government of Karnataka. The 16th BIFFES was held in Bengaluru from 1 to 8 March 2025.

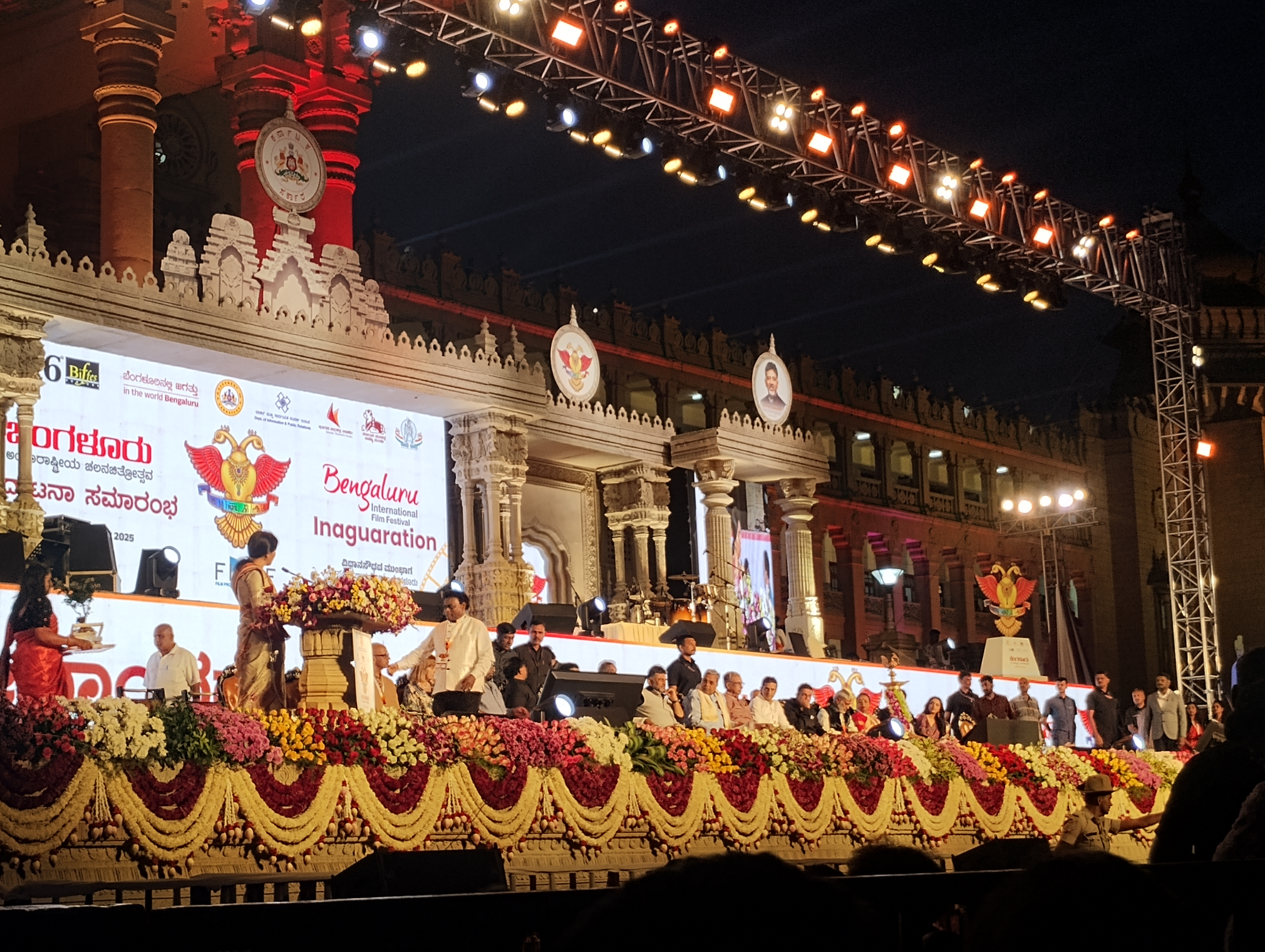
Inauguration of 16th edition in Vidhana Soudha on 1 March 2025

== Events history ==
- 1st Suchitra Bengaluru International Film Festival 2006 was held from 22 to 28 December 2006
- 2nd Suchitra Bengaluru International Film Festival 2008 was held from 3 to 10 January 2008
- 3rd Suchitra Bengaluru International Film Festival 2009 was held from December 2009
- 4th Bengaluru International Film Festival 2011 was held from 15 to 22 December 2011
- 5th Bengaluru International Film Festival 2012 was held from 20 to 27 December 2012
- 6th Bengaluru International Film Festival 2013 was held from 26 December 2013 to 2 January 2014
- 7th Bengaluru International Film Festival 2014 was held from 4 to 11 December 2014
- 8th Bengaluru International Film Festival 2016 was held from 28 January 2016 to 5 February 2016.
- 9th Bengaluru International Film Festival 2017 was held from 2 to 9 February 2017
- 10th Bengaluru International Film Festival 2018 was held from 22 February 2018 to 1 March 2018
- 11th Bengaluru International Film Festival 2019 was held from 21 February 2019 to 28 February 2019
- 12th Bengaluru International Film Festival 2020 was held from 26 February 2020 to 4 March 2020
- 13th Bengaluru International Film Festival 2022 was held from 3 to 10 March 2022
- 14th Bengaluru International Film Festival 2023 was held from 23 to 31 March 2023.
- 15th Bengaluru International Film Festival 2024 was held from 29 February to 7 March 2024.
- 16th Bengaluru International Film Festival 2025 was held from 1 to 8 March 2025.
- 17th Bengaluru International Film Festival 2026 scheduled from 29 Jan to 6 Feb 2026.

== Theme and Other details ==
Sl. No.	BIFFes Edition	Year	Date	Theme	Ambassador	KCA Chairpersoon	Venues
1	First	2006	22 to 28 December				
2	Second	2008	3 to 10 January				
3	Third	2009					
4	Fourth	2011	15 to 22 December				
5	Fifth	2012	20 to 27 December				
6	Sixth	2013	26 Dec 2013 to 2 Jan 2014				
7	Seventh	2014	4 to 11 December				
8	Eighth	2016	28 Jan to 5 Feb				
9	Ninth	2017	2 to 9 February				
10	Tenth	2018	22 Feb to 1 Mar				
11	Eleventh	2019	21 to 28 Feb				
12	Twelfth	2020	26 Feb to 4 Mar				
13	Thirteenth	2022	3 to 10 March				
14	Fourteenth	2023	23 to 31 March				
15	Fifteenth	2024	29 Feb to 7 Mar				
16	Sixteenth	2025	1 to 8 March	The Garden of All Communities (Sarva Janangada Shantiya Tota)	Kishore	Sadhu Kokila	PVR Orian Mall, Suchitra Film Society
17	Seventeenth	2026	29 Jan to 6 Feb	Woman: As She Is (Stree Andare Aste Saake)	Prakash Raj	Sadhu Kokila	Cinepolis LuLu Mall, Suchitra Film Society

== Movies screened during festival ==
- 13th BIFFES 2022 Movies List

== Old Logo of the Film Festival ==
Logo used in 2016
