= 45th National Film Awards =

National film award ceremony in India

- Awarded for: Best of Indian cinema in 1997
- Awarded by: Directorate of Film Festivals
- Presented by: K. R. Narayanan (President of India)
- Announced on: 8 May 1998
- Presented on: 10 July 1998
- Site: Vigyan Bhawan, New Delhi
- Official website: dff.nic.in

Highlights
- Best Feature Film: Thaayi Saheba
- Best Non-Feature Film: Jataner Jami
- Best Book: • Cinemachi Goshta • Hindi Cinema Aur Delhi
- Best Film Critic: Deepa Gahlot
- Dadasaheb Phalke Award: Kavi Pradeep
- Most awards: Thaayi Saheba (4)

The 45th National Film Awards, presented by Directorate of Film Festivals, the organisation set up by Ministry of Information and Broadcasting, India to felicitate the best of Indian Cinema released in the year 1997. The awards were announced on 8 May 1998 and presented on 10 July 1998 by then President of India, K. R. Narayanan.

== Awards ==
Awards were divided into feature films, non-feature films and books written on Indian cinema.

=== Lifetime Achievement Award ===
| Name of Award | Image | Awardee(s) | Awarded As | Awards |
|---|---|---|---|---|
| Dadasaheb Phalke Award | | Kavi Pradeep | Lyricist | Swarna Kamal, ₹ 100,000 and a Shawl |

=== Feature films ===
Feature films were awarded at All India as well as regional level. For National Film Awards, a Kannada film, Thaayi Saheba won the National Film Award for Best Feature Film also winning the maximum number of awards (4). Following were the awards given in each category:

==== Juries ====
A committee headed by B. Saroja Devi was appointed to evaluate the feature films awards. Following were the jury members:

- Jury Members
  - B. Saroja Devi (Chairperson) • P. Madhavan • Maheep Singh • C. V. L. Sastry • Aruna Purohit • Uma da Cunha • Devender Khandelwal • Sandip Ray • Santwana Bordoloi • Arundathi Nag • Pushpa Bharati • K. R. Mohanan • V. Madhusudhana Rao

==== All India Award ====
Following were the awards given:

===== Golden Lotus Award =====
Official Name: Swarna Kamal

All the awardees are awarded with 'Golden Lotus Award (Swarna Kamal)', a certificate and cash prize.

| Name of Award | Name of Film | Language | Awardee(s) | Cash prize |
|---|---|---|---|---|
| Best Feature Film | Thaayi Saheba | Kannada | Producer: Jaimala director: Girish Kasaravalli | ₹ 50,000/- Each |
| Best Feature Film | Citation: For its challenging portrayal of one woman who carries the burden of traditional constraints and restrictions of society and learns to overcome them with courage, dignity, sacrifice. In the process, she speaks for the emancipation of women. | | | |
| Best Debut Film of a Director | Bhoothakkannadi | Malayalam | Producer: Nair Krishnakumar Unni; Director: A. K. Lohithadas | ₹ 25,000/- Each |
| Best Debut Film of a Director | Citation: For the director's competent handling of the delicate balance of the human psyche. | | | |
| Best Popular Film Providing Wholesome Entertainment | Dil To Pagal Hai | Hindi | Producer: Yash Chopra; Director: Yash Chopra | ₹ 40,000/- Each |
| Best Popular Film Providing Wholesome Entertainment | Citation: For its clean, fun-loving portrayal of young people in the film that moves effortlessly and avoids any signs of violence or vulgarity. | | | |
| Best Children's Film | Ramayanam | Telugu | Producer: M. S. Reddy; Director: Gunasekhar | ₹ 30,000/- Each |
| Best Children's Film | Citation: For presenting the classical Indian epic in an entertaining narrative style with child actors playing all the legendary characters with ease and verve. The film provides an opportunity for children to keep in touch with the country's cultural heritage. | | | |
| Best Direction | Kaliyattam | Malayalam | Jayaraj | ₹ 50,000/- |
| Best Direction | Citation: For successfully transplanting the classic play by keeping the traditional "Theyyam" art form as a backdrop and weaving an extremely tight story, never losing control of the medium. | | | |

===== Silver Lotus Award =====
Official Name: Rajat Kamal

All the awardees are awarded with 'Silver Lotus Award (Rajat Kamal)', a certificate and cash prize.

| Name of Award | Name of Film | Language | Awardee(s) | Cash prize |
|---|---|---|---|---|
| Best Feature Film on National Integration | Border | Hindi | Producer: J. P. Dutta; Director: J. P. Dutta | ₹ 30,000/- Each |
| Best Feature Film on National Integration | Citation: For making an honest statement on patriotism, portraying the gallantry and sacrifies of the Armed forces, thereby instilling a sense of National pride. | | | |
| Best Film on Family Welfare | Samaantharangal | Malayalam | Producer: Balachandra Menon; Director: Balachandra Menon | ₹ 30,000/- Each |
| Best Film on Family Welfare | Citation: For an original script evolved from personal experience in a film that nurtures family and community life. The protagonist makes sacrifices in order to project the emotional and moral needs of his family members and through them projects a larger picture of the National Interests that bind us all. | | | |
| Best Film on Other Social Issues | Dhanna | Hindi | Producer: Films Division; Director: Deepak Roy | ₹ 30,000/- Each |
| Best Film on Other Social Issues | Citation: The film stands for the rights of a disabled person to be accorded the privileges of a normal human being within a family and in society. It states in a simple yet convincing manner that the disabled should be encouraged to develop their inner talents. | | | |
| Best Film on Environment / Conservation / Preservation | Bhoomi Geetha | Kannada | Producer: R. Mahadev Gowda; Director: Kesari Harvoo | ₹ 30,000/- Each |
| Best Film on Environment / Conservation / Preservation | Citation: For its sincere statement the need for a balanced approach towards environment and tribal cultures that get displaced in the course of development. | | | |
| Best Actor | Kaliyattam | Malayalam | Suresh Gopi | ₹ 10,000/- Each |
| Best Actor | Citation: For his control and presence in a role that demands a wide range of emotions. | | | ₹ 10,000/- Each |
| Best Actor | Samaantharangal | Malayalam | Balachandra Menon | ₹ 10,000/- Each |
| Best Actor | Citation: For his realistic and sensitive portrayal of a middle-class man who stands up for this high principles. | | | ₹ 10,000/- Each |
| Best Actress | Dahan | Bengali | • Indrani Haldar • Rituparna Sengupta | ₹ 10,000/- Each |
| Best Actress | Citation: For their restrained, sensitive portrayal of two women caught in a web in which both face humiliation. The two actresses are inspiring in the way they emerge richer from their experience. | | | |
| Best Supporting Actor | Iruvar | Tamil | Prakash Raj | ₹ 10,000/- |
| Best Supporting Actor | Citation: For his sensitive and consistent portrayal of a powerful character that spans a colourful political career. | | | |
| Best Supporting Actress | Dil To Pagal Hai | Hindi | Karisma Kapoor | ₹ 10,000/- |
| Best Supporting Actress | Citation: For her spirited and moving performance as a young woman who values friendship and love. | | | |
| Best Child Artist | Dhanna | Hindi | Dhanraj | ₹ 10,000/- |
| Best Child Artist | Citation: For actor's natural portrayal of a disabled person. His curiosity and interests make him turn from a social outcaste into a self-learning member of community. | | | |
| Best Male Playback Singer | Border ("Mere Dushman Mere Bhai") | Hindi | Hariharan | ₹ 10,000/- |
| Best Male Playback Singer | Citation: For his melodious rendering of the heartwarming song. | | | |
| Best Female Playback Singer | Virasat ("Paayalein Chun Mun") | Hindi | K. S. Chithra | ₹ 10,000/- |
| Best Female Playback Singer | Citation: For her effortless and playful rendering of the song. | | | |
| Best Cinematography | Iruvar | Tamil | Cameraman: Santosh Sivan; Laboratory Processing: Prasad Film Laboratories | ₹ 10,000/- Each |
| Best Cinematography | Citation: For maintaining a consistent style and pattern that does justice to the period and scale that the narrative deals with. | | | |
| Best Screenplay | Dahan | Bengali | Rituparno Ghosh | ₹ 10,000/- |
| Best Screenplay | Citation: For tactfully crafting a sensitive theme that dwells upon an incident which raises issues of social responsibility and personal awareness. | | | |
| Best Audiography | Ennu Swantham Janakikutty | Malayalam | Sampath | ₹ 10,000/- |
| Best Audiography | Citation: For using silence creatively to enhance a subject that deals with the isolation of a mind trapped in fantasy. | | | |
| Best Editing | The Terrorist | Tamil | A. Sreekar Prasad | ₹ 10,000/- |
| Best Editing | Citation: For his sleek, officient and sharp editing which gives the film an absorbing pace, making it gripping and thought provoking. | | | |
| Best Art Direction | Thaayi Saheba | Kannada | Ramesh Desai | ₹ 10,000/- |
| Best Art Direction | Citation: For his meticulous attention to minute details creating the exact atmosphere and aura of the film's period lifestyle and its changing perspective decade to decade. | | | |
| Best Costume Design | Thaayi Saheba | Kannada | Vaishali Kasaravalli | ₹ 10,000/- |
| Best Costume Design | Citation: For her care and perception in designing the period costuming required for a film that covers a demanding range encompassing the upper class to the common man. | | | |
| Best Music Direction | Annamayya | Telugu | M. M. Keeravani | ₹ 10,000/- |
| Best Music Direction | Citation: For the film's rich, classical music scores and its devotional fervor. | | | |
| Best Lyrics | Border | Hindi | Javed Akhtar | ₹ 10,000/- |
| Best Lyrics | Citation: For its evocative wording that is imbued with compassion for our nation and for human beings at large. | | | |
| Best Choreography | Dil To Pagal Hai | Hindi | Shiamak Davar | ₹ 10,000/- |
| Best Choreography | Citation: For the striking and aesthetic use of colour and design in the film with both elements enriching its rhythm and dance movement. | | | |
| Special Jury Award | Thaayi Saheba | Kannada | Jaimala (Actor) | ₹ 25,000/- |
| Special Jury Award | Citation: For her restrained and compellig portrayal of a woman who silently goes through the journey of life with grace and poise. | | | |
| Special Mention | Annamayya | Telugu | Nagarjuna (Actor) | Certificate Only |
| Special Mention | Citation: For his fine acting depicting various complex moods in wide ranging situations. | | | Certificate Only |
| Special Mention | Ennu Swantham Janakikutty | Malayalam | Jomol (Actress) | Certificate Only |
| Special Mention | Citation: For her natural portrayal of an innocent adolescent who becomes psychologically disturbed due to loneliness and rejection, finally her mental and emotional balance. | | | Certificate Only |

==== Regional Awards ====
The award is given to best film in the regional languages in India.

| Name of Award | Name of Film | Awardee(s) | Cash prize |
|---|---|---|---|
| Best Feature Film in Bengali | Dahan | Producer: Bijay Agarwal and Kalpana Agarwal; Director: Rituparno Ghosh | ₹ 20,000/- Each |
| Best Feature Film in Bengali | Citation: For the way in which film portrays two young women who undergo the agony of discovering the harsh realities of their situation and society. | | |
| Best Feature Film in Hindi | Hazaar Chaurasi Ki Maa | Producer: Govind Nihalani; Director: Govind Nihalani | ₹ 20,000/- Each |
| Best Feature Film in Hindi | Citation: For a moving depiction of the story of a mother who beings to realise her son's values and beliefs only after his tragic death and in the process emerges a stronger being. | | |
| Best Feature Film in Kannada | Mungarina Minchu | Producer: Jai Jagadish – R. Dushyanth Singh; Director: Rajendra Singh Babu | ₹ 20,000/- Each |
| Best Feature Film in Kannada | Citation: For its interesting and amusing portrayal of the unexpected series of events that change the life of all the character in this family. | | |
| Best Feature Film in Malayalam | Mangamma | Producer: NFDC; Director: T. V. Chandran | ₹ 20,000/- Each |
| Best Feature Film in Malayalam | Citation: The film tells the story of a remarkable courageous middle class woman who takes challenge upon challenge in her stride. Each confrontation makes a comment on social structures. | | |
| Best Feature Film in Oriya | Shesha Drushti | Producer: NFDC; Director: Apurba Kishore Bir | ₹ 20,000/- Each |
| Best Feature Film in Oriya | Citation: For effectively portraying two generations trapped in a web – one that can't break away from its past – the other that tries to deal with a present with no future. | | |
| Best Feature Film in Punjabi | Main Maa Punjab Dee | Producer: Devender Walia; Director: Balwant Dullat | ₹ 20,000/- Each |
| Best Feature Film in Punjabi | Citation: For the film's exploration of a suffering mother who undergoes the trauma created by her own sons and rediscovers her creative talent and rehabilitates herself. | | |
| Best Feature Film in Tamil | The Terrorist | Producer: A. Sriram; Director: Santosh Sivan | ₹ 20,000/- Each |
| Best Feature Film in Tamil | Citation: For the film's stylised, evocative presentation of a theme that introspectively and in a silent, subtle manner says a loud "NO" to violence. | | |
| Best Feature Film in Telugu | Sindhooram | Producer: Krishna Vamsi; Director: Krishna Vamsi | ₹ 20,000/- Each |
| Best Feature Film in Telugu | Citation: For the film's sincere effort at analysing, the problem of corruption which leads to disillusionment among the young and perpetuates violence within a society. | | |

=== Non-Feature Films ===
Short Films made in any Indian language and certified by the Central Board of Film Certification as a documentary/newsreel/fiction are eligible for non-feature film section.

==== Juries ====
A committee headed by K. K. Kapil was appointed to evaluate the non-feature films awards. Following were the jury members:

- Jury Members
  - K. K. Kapil (Chairperson) • Dinkar Chowdhary • Shashi Ranjan • Parvathi Menon • Namita Gokhale

==== Golden Lotus Award ====
Official Name: Swarna Kamal

All the awardees are awarded with 'Golden Lotus Award (Swarna Kamal)', a certificate and cash prize.

| Name of Award | Name of Film | Language | Awardee(s) | Cash prize |
|---|---|---|---|---|
| Best Non-Feature Film | Jataner Jami | Bengali | Producer: Raja Mitra and Associates; Director: Raja Mitra | ₹ 25,000/- Each |
| Best Non-Feature Film | Citation: For its moving portrayal of a landless peasant's empowerment and his ultimate betrayal. | | | |

==== Silver Lotus Award ====
Official Name: Rajat Kamal

All the awardees are awarded with 'Silver Lotus Award (Rajat Kamal)' and cash prize.

| Name of Award | Name of Film | Language | Awardee(s) | Cash prize |
|---|---|---|---|---|
| Best First Non-Feature Film | Mizhavu – A Silent Drum Beat | English | Producer: P. D. Raphel; Director: K. R. Subhash | ₹ 10,000/- Each |
| Best First Non-Feature Film | Citation: For its total and absorbing cinematic presentation of a unique and little-known percussion instrument. | | | |
| Best Anthropological / Ethnographic Film | In the Land of Lepchas | English | Producer: Government of West Bengal; Director: Anjan Bose and Manas Kamal Chowdhari | ₹ 10,000/- Each |
| Best Anthropological / Ethnographic Film | Citation: For the simple and humane depiction of life and values of the Lepcha tribe. | | | |
| Best Biographical Film | Mounam Sowmanasyam | Malayalam | Producer: T. Ravindranath; Director: Ravindran | ₹ 10,000/- Each |
| Best Biographical Film | Citation: For an insightful evocation of the shy and retiring filmmaker Arvindan, and the erudite assessment of his cinematic idiom. | | | |
| Best Arts / Cultural Film | The Official Art Form | English | Producer: National Gallery of Modern Art; Director: Suhasini Mulay and R. M. Gharekhan | ₹ 10,000/- Each |
| Best Arts / Cultural Film | Citation: For an important documentation of a vital transitional period of our cultural heritage. | | | |
| Best Scientific Film | Ayurveda | English | Producer: D. Gautaman for Films Division; Director: Bhanumurthy Alur | ₹ 10,000/- Each |
| Best Scientific Film | Citation: For an effective depiction of our ancient ayurvedic transition, and its reabsorption into mainstream medicine. | | | ₹ 10,000/- Each |
| Best Scientific Film | Cancer | Hindi | Producer: Bhanumurthy Alur for Films Division; Director: C. K. M. Rao | ₹ 10,000/- Each |
| Best Scientific Film | Citation: The film shatters many outdated beliefs about cancer and gives useful information about its prophylactic and curative treatment. | | | ₹ 10,000/- Each |
| Best Environment / Conservation / Preservation Film | Nature's Sentinels – Bishnoi | Hindi | Producer: Y. N. Engineer for Films Division; Director: Late P. C. Sharma and Shankar Patnaik | ₹ 10,000/- Each |
| Best Environment / Conservation / Preservation Film | Citation: For a forceful portrayal of a little known community's longstanding crusade for environmental conservation. | | | |
| Best Promotional Film | Sarang – Symphony in Cocophony | English | Producer: Y. N. Engineer for Films Division; Director: Joshy Joseph for Films Division | ₹ 10,000/- Each |
| Best Promotional Film | Citation: For an inspiring documentary about a young couple's commitment to revive the silent valley through organic farming. | | | |
| Best Agricultural Film | Post Harvest Management of Potato | Hindi | Producer: Y. N. Engineer for Films Division; Director: V. Packirisamy for Films Division | ₹ 10,000/- Each |
| Best Agricultural Film | Citation: For a well researched, informative and effectively communicated film which will be immense practical value to viewers. | | | |
| Best Historical Reconstruction / Compilation Film | Ayyankali – Adhastitharude Vimochakan | Malayalam | Producer: P. Sasidharan and A. Krishna; Director: R. S. Madhu | ₹ 10,000/- Each |
| Best Historical Reconstruction / Compilation Film | Citation: Besides being meticulously researched, the film also reconstructs the spirit of the first awakening against feudalisms and castes. | | | |
| Best Film on Social Issues | Matir Bhanr | Bengali | Producer: Anjana Ghosh Dastidar; Director: Debananda Sengupta | ₹ 10,000/- Each |
| Best Film on Social Issues | Citation: For an authentic portrayal of the struggle for identity empowerment by the underpriveleged girl child. | | | |
| Best Educational / Motivational / Instructional Film | Nirankush | Hindi | Producer: Venu Arora; Director: Venu Arora | ₹ 10,000/- Each |
| Best Educational / Motivational / Instructional Film | Citation: For a powerful dramatic narration of a young social worker's endeavours to attack the deeper social prejudice behind the heinous crime of female infanticide. | | | |
| Best Exploration / Adventure Film | In Search of Excellence | Hindi | Producer: Kuldeep Sinha for Films Division; Director: Raghu Krishna | ₹ 10,000/- Each |
| Best Exploration / Adventure Film | Citation: For a vigorous and inspiring look at Maharashtra's martially inspired popular sports including malkhamb. | | | |
| Best Investigative Film | Thirst | Hindi | Producer: Y. N. Engineer for Films Division; Director: Swadesh Pathak for Films Division | ₹ 10,000/- Each |
| Best Investigative Film | Citation: For a hard hitting indictment of the realities of water – resource mismanagement in rural India. | | | |
| Best Animation Film | Trade – Commerce | | Producer: Bhimsain; Director: Kireet Khurana | ₹ 10,000/- Each |
| Best Animation Film | Citation: This intriguingly titled expose of the evils of child prostitution uses the animation form in a creative and aesthetic manner. | | | |
| Best Short Fiction Film | Hypnothesis | Hindi | Producer: Film and Television Institute of India; Director: Rajat Kapoor | ₹ 10,000/- Each |
| Best Short Fiction Film | Citation: For a serious look, light heartedly presented, of the travesties of mass cinema. | | | |
| Best Film on Family Welfare | The Saviour | Hindi | Producer: Shaila Paralkar; Director: Shaila Paralkar | ₹ 10,000/- Each |
| Best Film on Family Welfare | Citation: This film simply and dexterously communicates the fundamentals of child health care to the masses. | | | ₹ 10,000/- Each |
| Best Film on Family Welfare | Banglar Baul | Bengali | Producer: Yash Chaudhary; Director: K. G. Das | ₹ 10,000/- Each |
| Best Film on Family Welfare | Citation: For its evocative exposition of family welfare issues employing the local folk and musical traditions. | | | ₹ 10,000/- Each |
| Best Cinematography | The Trail | English | Cameraman: Ashok Dasgupta | ₹ 10,000/- Each |
| Best Cinematography | Citation: This experimental film deals with the decolonisation of the mind through its strong and artistic visual images. | | | |
| Best Audiography | Matir Bhanr | Bengali | Pankaj Shil | ₹ 10,000/- |
| Best Audiography | Citation: For its strong sound structure which is woven and enmeshed into the fabric of the film. | | | |
| Best Editing | Jataner Jami | Bengali | Ujjal Nandy | ₹ 10,000/- |
| Best Editing | Citation: For the seamless and rhythmic flow of visual images, juxtaposing hope and despair in a harmonious aesthetic. | | | |
| Special Mention | Gotipua | English | Gulbahar Singh (Director) | Certificate Only |
| Special Mention | Citation: For a well researched portrayal of the still-vital dance form which is the predecessor and creative source of the Odissi tradition. | | | |

=== Best Writing on Cinema ===
The awards aim at encouraging study and appreciation of cinema as an art form and dissemination of information and critical appreciation of this art-form through publication of books, articles, reviews etc.

==== Juries ====
A committee headed by Chidananda Dasgupta was appointed to evaluate the writing on Indian cinema. Following were the jury members:

- Jury Members
  - Chidananda Dasgupta (Chairperson) • Tarun Vijay • Chandan Mitra

==== Golden Lotus Award ====
Official Name: Swarna Kamal

All the awardees are awarded with 'Golden Lotus Award (Swarna Kamal)' and cash prize.

| Name of Award | Name of Book | Language | Awardee(s) | Cash prize |
|---|---|---|---|---|
| Best Book on Cinema | Cinemachi Goshta | Marathi | Author: Anil Jhankar; Publisher: Rajhans Prakashan | ₹ 15,000/- Each |
| Best Book on Cinema | Citation: For a certain originality of analysis written in perceptive style together with reliability of information which makes this book capable of enriching the readers understanding of cinema. | | | ₹ 15,000/- Each |
| Best Book on Cinema | Hindi Cinema Aur Delhi | Hindi | Author: Savita Bhakhri and Adithya Aswathi; Publisher: Praveen Prakashan | ₹ 15,000/- Each |
| Best Book on Cinema | Citation: For a well researched account of Hindi cinema with socio-economic aspects supported by extensive opinion surveys in the Delhi region which endows this book with considerable interest. | | | ₹ 15,000/- Each |
| Best Film Critic | | English | Deepa Gahlot | ₹ 15,000/- |
| Best Film Critic | Citation: Her writings reflect a serious social and artistic approach to cinema, embracing its historical background and contemporary dynamics. It combines seriousness of understanding with popular communication and is thus of significance to the wider audience. | | | |

=== Awards not given ===
Following were the awards not given as no film was found to be suitable for the award:

- Best Special Effects
- Best Feature Film in Assamese
- Best Feature Film in English
- Best Feature Film in Manipuri
- Best Feature Film in Marathi
- Best Non-Feature Film Music Direction
