= 33rd National Film Awards (India) =

National Film Awards (India)

- 33rd National Film Awards
- Awarded for: Best of Indian cinema in 1985
- Awarded by: Directorate of Film Festivals
- Presented by: Giani Zail Singh (President of India)
- Presented on: June 1986
- Official website: dff.nic.in

Highlights
- Best Feature Film: Chidambaram
- Best Non-Feature Film: Mumbai: Our City
- Best Book: Guru Dutt: Teen Anki Shokantika
- Dadasaheb Phalke Award: V. Shantaram
- Most awards: • New Delhi Times • Sindhu Bhairavi (3)

The 33rd National Film Awards, presented by Directorate of Film Festivals, the organisation set up by Ministry of Information and Broadcasting, India to felicitate the best of Indian Cinema released in the year 1985. Ceremony took place in June 1986.

== Awards ==
Awards were divided into feature films, non-feature films and books written on Indian cinema.

=== Lifetime Achievement Award ===
Name of Award	Image	Awardee(s)	Awarded As	Awards
Dadasaheb Phalke Award		V. Shantaram	Actor, Film director and Film producer	Swarna Kamal, ₹ 1.00,000 and a Shawl

=== Feature films ===
Feature films were awarded at All India as well as regional level. For 33rd National Film Awards, a Malayalam film, Chidambaram won the National Film Award for Best Feature Film, whereas Hindi film, New Delhi Times and Tamil film, Sindhu Bhairavi won the maximum number of awards (3). Following were the awards given in each category:

==== Juries ====
A committee headed by veteran actor Prem Nazir was appointed to evaluate the feature films awards. Following were the jury members:

- Jury Members
  - Prem Nazir (Chairperson) • J. P. Das • Jaya Bachchan • Komal Swaminathan • V. K. Madhavan Kutty • Prema Karanth • Bapu Watve • Gautam Ghose • Kanhaiya Lal Nandan (Not attended) • Gummadi (Not attended)

==== All India Award ====
Following were the awards given:

===== Golden Lotus Award =====
Official Name: Swarna Kamal

All the awardees are awarded with 'Golden Lotus Award (Swarna Kamal)', a certificate and cash prize.

Name of Award	Name of Film	Language	Awardee(s)	Cash prize
Best Feature Film	Chidambaram	Malayalam	Producer: Suryakanti Film Makers	₹ 50,000/-
Best Feature Film	Chidambaram	Malayalam	director: G. Aravindan	₹ 25,000/-
Best Feature Film	Citation: For providing rare cinematic experience while delineating the inner conflicts and suffering of an individual set against the backdrop of the elements.			
Best Debut Film of a Director	New Delhi Times	Hindi	Producer: P. K. Tiwari; Director: Romesh Sharma	₹ 25,000/- Each
Best Debut Film of a Director	Citation: For a bold exposure of a murky world of politics where murder and mayhem are engineered for personal gains and truth becomes a casualty.			
Best Children's Film	Aazadi Ki Ore	Hindi	Producer: Sangeethalaya	₹ 30,000/-
Best Children's Film	Aazadi Ki Ore	Hindi	Director: P. S. Prakash	₹ 15,000/-
Best Children's Film	Citation: For exploring man's cruelty to and exploitation of animals and, through an interesting story, inculcating in the minds of children the love of animals.			

===== Silver Lotus Award =====
Official Name: Rajat Kamal

All the awardees are awarded with 'Golden Lotus Award (Swarna Kamal)', a certificate and cash prize.

Name of Award	Name of Film	Language	Awardee(s)	Cash prize
Best Feature Film on National Integration	Sree Narayana Guru	Malayalam	Producer: A. Jaffer	₹ 30,000/-
Best Feature Film on National Integration	Sree Narayana Guru	Malayalam	Director: P. A. Backer	₹ 15,000/-
Best Feature Film on National Integration	Citation: For preaching, through the life of a great reformer, the universal values of "One Caste, One Religion and One God for Man".			
Best Direction	Trikal	Hindi	Shyam Benegal	₹ 20,000/-
Best Direction	Citation: For the masterly treatment of an unusual story which, through subtle and sensitive handling, brings out the conflicts in a family trapped in strange memories and situations.			
Best Cinematography	New Delhi Times	Hindi	Subrata Mitra	₹ 15,000/-
Best Cinematography	Citation: For inspired camera work which brings out the delicate nuances of light and shade resulting in a strong visual presentation.			
Best Screenplay	Agnisnaan	Assamese	Bhabendra Nath Saikia	₹ 10,000/-
Best Screenplay	Citation: For the powerful rendering of the saga of a woman who goes through the revolution against the prevailing social mores and comes to terms with herself.			
Best Actor	New Delhi Times	Hindi	Shashi Kapoor	₹ 10,000/-
Best Actor	Citation: For a convincing and credible portrayal of a dedicated journalist caught in the cross-currents of political manoevring.			
Best Actress	Sindhu Bhairavi	Tamil	Suhasini Maniratnam	₹ 10,000/-
Best Actress	Citation: For her superb performance in the difficult role of a woman who goes through life as lover and unwed mother who has finally to go back to her lonely existence.			
Best Supporting Actor	Paroma	Bengali	Deepankar De	₹ 10,000/-
Best Supporting Actor	Citation: For a convincing portrayal of anguish of a husband who is unable to accept his wife.			
Best Supporting Actress	Rao Saheb	Hindi	Vijaya Mehta	₹ 10,000/-
Best Supporting Actress	Citation: For the delicate delineation of the role of a middle-aged widow fighting for modernity though herself rooted in tradition.			
Best Child Artist	Bettada Hoovu	Kannada	Master Puneet	₹ 5,000/-
Best Child Artist	Citation: For his lively and effortless performance in the role of a poor boy who has to make the difficult choice between his personal goal and his family responsibilities.			
Best Audiography	Ek Pal	Hindi	Hitendra Ghosh	₹ 10,000/-
Best Audiography	Citation: For his masterly use of the sound track in keeping with the atmosphere of the film.			
Best Editing	Hum Naujawan	Hindi	Babu Sheikh	₹ 10,000/-
Best Editing	Citation: For his work in the film which, due to his slick editing becomes more effective.			
Best Art Direction	Rao Saheb	Hindi	Sham Bhutkar	₹ 10,000/-
Best Art Direction	Citation: For the authentic creation of a setting of the early years of the century.			
Best Music Direction	Sindhu Bhairavi	Tamil	Ilaiyaraja	₹ 10,000/-
Best Music Direction	Citation: For innovative blending of folk and classical music which lends strength and power to the story.			
Best Lyrics	Muthal Mariyathai	Tamil	Vairamuthu	₹ 10,000/-
Best Lyrics	Citation: For imaginative use of folk images and form which blend with the pastoral and idyllic backdrop of the film.			
Best Male Playback Singer	Sree Narayana Guru	Malayalam	Jayachandran	₹ 10,000/-
Best Male Playback Singer	Citation: For his superb rendering of devotional songs keeping in tune with the subject matter of the film.			
Best Female Playback Singer	Sindhu Bhairavi	Tamil	K. S. Chithra	₹ 10,000/-
Best Female Playback Singer	Citation: For melifluous rendering of songs, both in the folk and the classical moulds, bringing about a melodious synthesis between the two.			
Best Costume Design	Trikal	Hindi	Saba Zaidi	₹ 10,000/-
Best Costume Design	Citation: For creatively designing the appropriate costumes for this period film, thereby lending authenticity to the milieu.			
Special Jury Award	Mayuri	Telugu	Sudha Chandran	₹ 5,000/-
Special Jury Award	Citation: For her work in the film in which, in her first screen appearance, she convincingly recreates her own life-story with courage and determination.			

==== Regional Awards ====
The award is given to best film in the regional languages in India.

Name of Award	Name of Film	Awardee(s)	Cash prize
Best Feature Film in Assamese	Agnisnaan	Producer: Bhabendra Nath Saikia	₹ 20,000/-
Best Feature Film in Assamese	Agnisnaan	Director: Bhabendra Nath Saikia	₹ 10,000/-
Best Feature Film in Assamese	Citation: For a powerful film based on a well-known Assamese novel, portraying the ordeals of a woman who revolts and finally overcomes.		
Best Feature Film in Bengali	Parama	Producer: Nirmal Kumar Guha, Niharendu Guha, Sukhendu Guha, Sarojendu Guha	₹ 20,000/-
Best Feature Film in Bengali	Parama	Director: Aparna Sen	₹ 10,000/-
Best Feature Film in Bengali	Citation: For a film which handles sensitively the delicate story of a woman who refuses to accept the feeling of guilt forced on her by society.		
Best Feature Film in Bodo	Alayaron	Producer: Bodosa Film Productions	₹ 20,000/-
Best Feature Film in Bodo	Alayaron	Director: Jwndgao Bodosa	₹ 10,000/-
Best Feature Film in Bodo	Citation: For pioneering a film in the language which faithfully brings out the socio-economic life of Bodo community.		
Best Feature Film in Hindi	Anantyatra	Producer: Nachiket Patwardhan	₹ 20,000/-
Best Feature Film in Hindi	Anantyatra	Director: Nachiket Patwardhan and Jayu Patwardhan	₹ 10,000/-
Best Feature Film in Hindi	Citation: For an unusual film blending with fact and fantasy, dealing with the contemporary subject of the frustrations of middle-aged executive, presented with wit and humour.		
Best Feature Film in Kannada	Bettada Hoovu	Producer: Parvathamma Rajkumar	₹ 20,000/-
Best Feature Film in Kannada	Bettada Hoovu	Director: N. Lakshminarayan	₹ 10,000/-
Best Feature Film in Kannada	Citation: For a well-made film with a sensitive story of socio-economic deprivation told against a lyrical backdrop.		
Best Feature Film in Malayalam	Thinkalaazhcha Nalla Divasam	Producer: M. Mani	₹ 20,000/-
Best Feature Film in Malayalam	Thinkalaazhcha Nalla Divasam	Director: P. Padmarajan	₹ 10,000/-
Best Feature Film in Malayalam	Citation: For exploring the layers of family relationship in a rural setting threatened by urban culture and explains how the imminent breakdown of the joint family is prevented by a death.		
Best Feature Film in Marathi	Pudhche Paool	Producer: Madhukar Rupji, Sudha A. Chitle and Vinay Newalkar	₹ 20,000/-
Best Feature Film in Marathi	Pudhche Paool	Director: Rajdutt	₹ 10,000/-
Best Feature Film in Marathi	Citation: For a film with powerful social content, exposing the evil of dowry and underlining that the only solution is social censure.		
Best Feature Film in Oriya	Hakim Babu	Producer: Amiya Patnaik	₹ 20,000/-
Best Feature Film in Oriya	Hakim Babu	Director: Pranab Das	₹ 10,000/-
Best Feature Film in Oriya	Citation: For a film which makes a powerful comment on the bureaucratic system which renders even an idealistic officer helpless and unable to realise his own objectives.		
Best Feature Film in Tamil	Muthal Mariyathai	Producer: Bharathiraja	₹ 20,000/-
Best Feature Film in Tamil	Muthal Mariyathai	Director: Bharathiraja	₹ 10,000/-
Best Feature Film in Tamil	Citation: For a love story about the suffering of a man who is destined to live with his memories, spending his last days in a hut on the banks of river in idyllic surroundings.		
Best Feature Film in Telugu	Sravanthi	Producer: Jayakrishna	₹ 20,000/-
Best Feature Film in Telugu	Sravanthi	Director: Kranthi Kumar	₹ 10,000/-
Best Feature Film in Telugu	Citation: For a moving film, which depicts the plight of the quitessential Indian woman who goes through life discharging obligations as daughter, wife and mother.		

=== Non-Feature Films ===
Short Films made in any Indian language and certified by the Central Board of Film Certification as a documentary/newsreel/fiction are eligible for non-feature film section.

==== Juries ====
A committee headed by M. V. Krishnaswamy was appointed to evaluate the non-feature films awards. Following were the jury members:

- Jury Members
  - M. V. Krishnaswamy (Chairperson) • Satish Bahadur • T. M. Ramachandran • Pankaj Butalia

==== Golden Lotus Award ====
Official Name: Swarna Kamal

All the awardees are awarded with 'Golden Lotus Award (Swarna Kamal)', a certificate and cash prize.

Name of Award	Name of Film	Language	Awardee(s)	Cash prize
Best Non-Feature Film	Mumbai: Our City	English	Producer and Director: Anand Patwardhan	₹ 15,000/- Each
Best Non-Feature Film	Citation: For its deep concern for the problem of urban slums and the courageous presentation of the theme in an objective manner.			

==== Silver Lotus Award ====
Official Name: Rajat Kamal

All the awardees are awarded with 'Silver Lotus Award (Rajat Kamal)' and cash prize.

Name of Award	Name of Film	Language	Awardee(s)	Cash prize
Best Anthropological / Ethnographic Film	The Whispering Wind	English	Producer: Director: Biplab Roy Choudhury	₹ 10,000/- Each
Best Anthropological / Ethnographic Film	Citation: For its authentic and comprehensive depiction of the traditional life of the Dongria tribe of Orissa facing social change.			
Best Biographical Film	Satyajit Ray	English	Producer: Films Division; Director: Shyam Benegal	₹ 10,000/- Each
Best Biographical Film	Citation: For the deep analysis of the life and work of Satyajit Ray, in a face-to-face interaction.			₹ 10,000/- Each
Best Biographical Film	The Seer Who Walks Alone	English	Producer and Director: G. Aravindan	₹ 10,000/- Each
Best Biographical Film	Citation: For the sensitive portrayal of the life, personality and philosophy of J. Krishnamurthi, the noted philosopher.			₹ 10,000/- Each
Best Arts / Cultural Film	Warli Painting	English	Producer: B. R. Shendge; Director: V. K. Wankhede	₹ 10,000/- Each
Best Arts / Cultural Film	Citation: For a perceptive exploration of the relationship between the life and art of the warli tribals.			
Best Scientific Film (including Environment and Ecology)	Power to the People	English	Producer: B. N. Mehra; Director: K. Balakrishnan Nair	₹ 10,000/- Each
Best Scientific Film (including Environment and Ecology)	Citation: For its convincing portrayal of the importance of a people's movement for scientific attitude towards social change.			
Best Industrial Film	Safety Measures in Handling Agriculture Machinery	English	Producer: D. Gautaman; Director: Gurbir Singh Grewal	₹ 10,000/- Each
Best Industrial Film	Citation: For its clear instructional value.			
Best Agricultural Film	Cash in Cashew Cultivation	English	Producer: K. K. Garg; Director: D. Gautaman	₹ 10,000/- Each
Best Agricultural Film	Citation: For its rich international content about the scientific development in the improvement of cashew crop.			
Best Film on Family Welfare	Bai	Marathi	Producer: Streevani and Ishvani; Director: Sumitra Bhave	₹ 10,000/- Each
Best Film on Family Welfare	Citation: For its realistic portrayal of poor, oppressed housewife who succeeds in her determined effort to rehabilitate herself and realise her potential to be on her own.			
Best Exploration / Adventure Film	High Adventure on White Waters	English	Producer: Yash Choudhary; Director: C. L. Kaul	₹ 10,000/- Each
Best Exploration / Adventure Film	Citation: For its depiction of the thrills of a new water sport in India.			
Best News Review	News Magazine No.: 59 – Taranath Shenoy	English	Producer: P. B. Pendharkar and Pritam S. Arshi; Director: M. S. Gangadhar and Ashok Patil	₹ 10,000/- Each
Best News Review	Citation: For an in-depth coverage of the strong determination of Taranath Shenoy, the handicapped swimmer, who crossed the English channel.			
Best Animation Film	Karuna Ki Vijay	Hindi	Producer: Children's Film Society director and Animator: K. S. Bansod	₹ 10,000/- Each
Best Animation Film	Citation: For its artistice excellence in the use of animation techniques in presenting a heart-warming story for children.			
Special Jury Award	Bodhvriksha	Hindi	Rajan Khosa	₹ 5,000/-
Special Jury Award	Citation: For his sensitive exploration of the anguish of a woman nursing her aged, paralysed grandmother. The film is characterised by economy and control and innovative cinematic form.			
Special Mention	Prisoners of Circumstances	English	Producer: Film and Television Institute of India; Director: Ramesh Handoo	Certificate Only
Special Mention	Citation: For its objective presentation of the inhuman treatment of children in remand homes.			Certificate Only
Special Mention	Anukaran	Hindi	Producer: R. K. Gupta; Director: Gul Bahar Singh	Certificate Only
Special Mention	Citation: For a poignant of discrimination against women in Indian society.			Certificate Only

=== Best Writing on Cinema ===
The awards aim at encouraging study and appreciation of cinema as an art form and dissemination of information and critical appreciation of this art-form through publication of books, articles, reviews etc.

==== Juries ====
A committee headed by Amita Malik was appointed to evaluate the writing on Indian cinema. Following were the jury members:

- Jury Members
  - Amita Malik (Chairperson) • N. N. Pillai • B. V. Dharap

==== Silver Lotus Award ====
Official Name: Rajat Kamal

All the awardees are awarded with 'Silver Lotus Award (Rajat Kamal)' and cash prize.

Name of Award	Name of Book	Language	Awardee(s)	Cash prize
Best Book on Cinema	Guru Dutt: Teen Anki Shokantika	Marathi	Author: Arun Khopkar	₹ 5,000/-
Best Book on Cinema	Citation: For a book as it is a major critical work on Guru Dutt, which is researched, attractively published at a reasonable price with a wealth of visual which enriches any book on cinema.			

=== Awards not given ===
Following were the awards not given as no film was found to be suitable for the award:

- Best Feature Film with Mass Appeal, Wholesome Entertainment and Aesthetic Value
- Best Film on Family Welfare
- Best Film on Other Social Issues
- Best Historical Reconstruction/Compilation Film
- Second Best Feature Film
- Best Feature Film in Manipuri
- Best Feature Film in Punjabi
- Best Promotional Film
- Best Film Critic
