= National Film Award for Best Promotional Film =

Annual film award in India

- National award for contributions to short film
- Sponsored by: Directorate of Film Festivals
- Formerly called: Best Promotional Film (Commercial) (1967–76); Best Promotional Film (Non-Commercial) (1967–76)
- Rewards: Rajat Kamal (Silver Lotus); ₹50,000
- First award: 1967
- Final award: 2021
- Most recent winner: Endangered Heritage

Highlights
- Total awarded: 35
- First winner: The Brown Diamond (Commercial); Sandesh (Non-Commercial)

The National Film Award for Best Promotional Film was one of the National Film Awards presented annually by the Directorate of Film Festivals, the organisation set up by Ministry of Information and Broadcasting, India. It was one of several awards presented for non-feature films and awarded with Rajat Kamal (Silver Lotus).

The award was instituted in 1967, at 15th National Film Awards and awarded annually for short films produced in the year across the country, in all Indian languages. At the 70th National Film Awards, the award is discontinued and clubbed with National Film Award for Best Investigative Film, National Film Award for Best Scientific Film, National Film Award for Best Educational/Motivational/Instructional Film, National Film Award for Best Exploration/Adventure Film, National Film Award for Best Anthropological/Ethnographic Film, National Film Award for Best Agriculture Film, National Film Award for Best Film on Social Issues and National Film Award for Best Non-Feature Environment/Conservation/Preservation Film, and two new categories were created; Best Documentary and Best Non Feature Film Promoting Social and Environmental Values.

== Winners ==
Award includes 'Rajat Kamal' (Silver Lotus) and cash prize. Following are the award winners over the years:

Awards legends
*	Best Promotional Film (Commercial)
*	Best Promotional Film (Non-Commercial)
*	Indicates a joint award for that year

List of films, showing the year, language(s), producer(s) and director(s)
Year	Film(s)	Language(s)	Producer(s)	Director(s)	Refs.
1967 (15th)	The Brown Diamond	English	Krishnaswamy Associates	S. Krishnaswamy	
1967 (15th)	Sandesh	Hindi	J. S. Bhownagary and K. L. Khandpur for Films Division	Omprakash Sharma	
1968 (16th)	No Award				
1969 (17th)	Weave Me Some Flowers	English	Mohan Wadhwani for Films Division	P. B. Pendharkar	
1970 (18th)	No Award				
1971 (19th)					
1972 (20th)	Destination India	English	Cinerad Communications	Zafar Hai	
1973 (21st)	Delhi the City Beautiful	English	Jagdish Banerjee	Jagdish Banerjee	
1973 (21st)	Fibre The Fabric of Life	English	Khadi and Village Industries Commission	G. L. Bhardwaj	
1974 (22nd)	To Serve Is To Love	English	Cinerad Communications for Air India	Zafar Hai	
1974 (22nd)	Ek Anek Aur Ekta	Hindi	Bhim Sain	Vijaya Mulay	
1975 (23rd)	Zenith of India	English	Film Media	Jyoti G. Thakur	
1975 (23rd)	Poems in Pattern	English	Ranabir Ray	Ranabir Ray	
1976 (24th)					
1977 (25th)	Parvati	Hindi	Santi P. Chowdhury	Santi P. Chowdhury	
1978 (26th)	It Is Indian It Is Good	Hindi	Films Division	B. D. Garga	
1979 (27th)					
1980 (28th)	Oil Offshore	English	Prem Prakash	Satya Prakash	
1981 (29th)	Hydrum	English	Omprakash Sharma for Films Division	Mahmood Quereshi	
1982 (30th)	No Award				
1983 (31st)	Ekta Aur Anushasan	Hindi	K. S. Kulkarni	S. K. Sharma	
1984 (32nd)	No Award				
1985 (33rd)	No Award				
1986 (34th)	No Award				
1987 (35th)	No Award				
1988 (36th)	No Award				
1989 (37th)	Tuna: The Chicken of the Sea	English	D. Gautaman	K. Jagajivan Ram	
1990 (38th)	No Award				
1991 (39th)	Of Mines and Men	English	P. C. Sharma	Raghu Krishna	
1992 (40th)	Sound of the Dying Colors	English	Paran Barbarooah, B. B. Productions	Sher Choudhury	
1993 (41st)	Timeless India	English	Zafar Hai	Zafar Hai	
1994 (42nd)	Blue Flames, Green Villages	English	National Afforestation and Eco-Development Board, Ministry of Environment and Forests	Ramesh Asher	
1995 (43rd)	No Award				
1996 (44th)	No Award				
1997 (45th)	Sarang: Symphony in Cocophony	English	Y. N. Engineer for Films Division	Joshy Joseph for Films Division	
1998 (46th)	No Award				
1999 (47th)	No Award				
2000 (48th)	Pashmina Royale	English	Bappa Ray	Bappa Ray	
2001 (49th)	News Magazine No. 458 (In Search of Muga Silk)	English	Y. N. Engineer for Films Division	K. G. Das	
2002 (50th)	The Treasure in the Snow: A Film on Sikkim	English	• Ministry of External Affairs • South Asia Foundation	Goutam Ghose	
2003 (51st)	Ladakh: The Land of Mystery	English	Biyot Projna Tripathy	Biyot Projna Tripathy	
2004 (52nd)	No Award				
2005 (53rd)	No Award				
2006 (54th)	Rendezvous With Time	English	Madhya Pradesh Madhyam	Rajendra Junglay	
2007 (55th)	No Award				
2008 (56th)	Lost and Found	• Marathi • English • Hindi	• Harshavardhan G. Kulkarni • Kirti Nakhwa • Amitabh Shukla	Harshavardhan G. Kulkarni	
2009 (57th)	No Award				
2010 (58th)	Ek Ropa Dhan	Hindi	Meghnath Bhattacharjee	• Biju Toppo • Meghnath Bhattacharjee	
2011 (59th)	The Dream Fulfilled: Memories of the Engineering Challenges	English	Delhi Metro Rail Corporation	Satish Pande	
2012 (60th)	Dreaming Taj Mahal	• Hindi • Urdu	Nirmal Chander	Nirmal Chander	
2013 (61st)	Chasing The Rainbow	English	Edumedia India	Charu Shree Roy	
2013 (61st)	Kush	Hindi	Red Carpet Moving Pictures Pvt. Ltd.	Shubhashish Bhutiani	
2014 (62nd)	Documentation of Clay Image Makers of Kumartuli	English	Indira Gandhi National Centre for the Arts	Ranajit Ray	
2015 (63rd)	Weaves of Maheshwar	• Hindi • English	Storyloom Films	• Keya Vaswani • Nidhi Kamath	
2016 (64th)	No Award				
2017 (65th)	Poetry on Fabric : Chanderinama		Sanjay Gupta for Pro Art India	Rajendra Junglay	
2018 (66th)	Rediscovering Jajam	• Hindi	• Rachel Bracken-Singh • Anokhi Museum of Hand Printing	• Avinash Maurya • Kriti Gupta	
2019 (67th)	The Shower		Little Lamb Films Pvt. Ltd.	Bauddhayan Mukherji	
2020 (68th)	Surmounting Challenges	English	Delhi Metro Rail Corporation	Satish Pande	
2021 (69th)	Endangered Heritage		Baba Cinemas	Hemant Verma	
