= National Film Award for Best Anthropological/Ethnographic Film =

Indian film award

- National award for contributions to Short films
- Sponsored by: Directorate of Film Festivals
- Rewards: Rajat Kamal (Silver Lotus); ₹50,000
- First award: 1984
- Final award: 2017
- Most recent winner: • Name, Place, Animal, Thing; • Slave Genesis

Highlights
- Total awarded: 31
- First winner: Bada Media

The National Film Award for Best Anthropological/Ethnographic Film was one of the National Film Awards presented annually by the Directorate of Film Festivals, the organisation set up by Ministry of Information and Broadcasting, India. It was one of several awards presented for feature films and awarded with Rajat Kamal (Silver Lotus).

The award was instituted in 1984, at 32nd National Film Awards and awarded annually for films produced in the year across the country, in all Indian languages. At the 70th National Film Awards, the award is discontinued and clubbed with National Film Award for Best Promotional Film, National Film Award for Best Scientific Film, National Film Award for Best Educational/Motivational/Instructional Film, National Film Award for Best Exploration/Adventure Film, National Film Award for Best Investigative Film, National Film Award for Best Agriculture Film, National Film Award for Best Film on Social Issues and National Film Award for Best Non-Feature Environment/Conservation/Preservation Film, and two new categories were created; Best Documentary and Best Non Feature Film Promoting Social and Environmental Values.

== Winners ==
Award includes 'Rajat Kamal' (Silver Lotus) and cash prize. Following are the award winners over the years:

Indicates a joint award for that year

List of films, showing the year language(s), producer(s) and director(s)
Year	Film(s)	Language(s)	Producer(s)	Director(s)	Refs.
1984 (32nd)	Bada Media	Hindi	–	Manohar S. Varpe	
1985 (33rd)	The Whispering Wind	English	–	Biplab Roy Choudhury	
1986 (34th)	The Land Where Wind Blows Free	English	Director of Cultural Affairs, Assam	Chandra Narayan Barua	
1987 (35th)	Raaste Band Hain Sab	Hindi	Manjiri Dingwaney, Rural Labour Cell	Manjiri Dutta	
1988 (36th)	Maa Ooru	Telugu	B. Ramachandra Rao	B. Narsing Rao	
1989 (37th)	Baiga	Hindi	Madhya Pradesh Madhyam	Rajendra Janglay	
1990 (38th)	Lolaab	English	Hillman Film Pvt. Ltd	Mohi-Ud-Din Mirza	
1991 (39th)	The Valiant Ones	English	A. K. Balakrishnan	A. K. Balakrishnan	
1992 (40th)	Wangala: A Garo Festival	English	Bappa Ray	Bappa Ray	
1993 (41st)	Ladakh: Life Along the Indus	English	Bappa Ray	Bappa Ray	
1994 (42nd)	The Trapped	English	K. Jayachandran	O. K. Johnny	
1995 (43rd)	Yelhou Jagoi	Meitei	Indira Gandhi National Centre for the Arts	Aribam Syam Sharma	
1996 (44th)	No Award				
1997 (45th)	In the Land of Lepchas	English	Government of West Bengal	• Anjan Bose • Manas Kamal Chowdhari	
1998 (46th)	Kherwal Parab	Santali	Sankar Rakshit	Sankar Rakshit	
1999 (47th)	Koihatir Dhulia	Assamese	Satyabrat Kalita	Hemanta Das	
1999 (47th)	Surabhi	Telugu	K. Jaydev	K. N. T. Sastry	
2000 (48th)	Scribbles on Akka	Kannada	Flavia Agnes	Madhusree Dutta	
2001 (49th)	The Monpas of Arunachal Pradesh	English	Films Division	Aribam Syam Sharma	
2002 (50th)	The Morung: Silent Witness of the Brave Wancho	English	Anthropological Survey of India	Bappa Ray	
2003 (51st)	Aur Ghumantu Thhahar Gaye	Hindi	Leo Arts Communication	Meenakshi Vinay Rai	
2004 (52nd)	The Legend of Fat Mama	English	Rafeeq Ellias	Rafeeq Ellias	
2005 (53rd)	Spirit of the Graceful Lineage	English	Bibi Devi Barbarooah	Prerana Barbarooah	
2006 (54th)	No Award				
2007 (55th)	Tai Phakey	English	Priyam Chaliha	Mridul Gupta	
2008 (56th)	Boliya Pitaier Sohoki Sootal	Assamese	• Altaf Mazid • Zabeen Ahmed • Susanta Roy	Altaf Mazid	
2009 (57th)	No Award				
2010 (58th)	Songs of Mashangva	• Tangkhul • Meitei • English	Oinam Doren	Oinam Doren	
2011 (59th)	Bom	• Hindi • English	Anirban Datta	Amlan Datta	
2012 (60th)	Char... The No-Man's Island	Bengali	Sourav Sarangi	Sourav Sarangi	
2013 (61st)	No Award				
2014 (62nd)	Qissa–e–Parsi : The Parsi Story	English	Public Service Broadcasting Trust	• Divya Cowasji • Shilpi Gulati	
2015 (63rd)	Aoleang	English	Maulana Abul Kalam Azad Institute of Asian Studies	Ranajit Ray	
2016 (64th)	No Award				
2017 (65th)	Name, Place, Animal, Thing		Nithin R.	Nithin R.	
2017 (65th)	Slave Genesis		Aneez K. M.	Aneez K. M.	
2018 (66th)	No Award				
2019 (67th)	No Award				
2020 (68th)	No Award				
2021 (69th)	No Award				
