= R. K. Bidur Singh =

Indian film critic and film society activist (1941–2021)

- Born: Rajkumar Bidursana Singh; 17 October 1941; Nongmeibung Wangkheirakpam Leikai, Imphal, Manipur
- Died: 9 June 2021 (aged 79)
- Occupations: Film critic, writer
- Parent(s): R. K. Haimosana; R. K. Ongbi Bidhumukhi
- Writing career
- Notable awards: National Film Award for Best Film Critic (2008)

R. K. Bidur Singh (17 October 1941 – 9 June 2021) was a notable Indian film critic and film society activist from Imphal, Manipur. He won the Best Critic Award at the 56th National Film Awards. He worked as a government employee and retired as an assistant account officer. His published books include Wakhal Machu Machu, Shaktam Makhal Makhal (2011), Mitkup Khara (2012) and Kaunakhigadra Haina (Atenba Punshi Shaktamsing) (2013).

Manipur State Film Development Society (MSFDS) described him as an Encyclopedia of Manipuri cinema. He succumbed to post COVID-19 complications on 9 June 2021.

== Associations and activities ==
R.K. Bidur Singh was the founding president of the Manipur Film Journalist/Critics Association (MFJCA). He was also a jury member of the National Film Awards for Best Writing on Cinema at the 57th National Film Awards. He took charge for some years as the General Secretary of the Imphal Cine Club. He had associated with National Film Development Corporation of India (Kolkata) - Film Script Panel, Film Critics Circle of India and the Cultural Forum, Manipur as members. Singh was the former Chairman of the film screening committee, Manipur Film Development Corporation Limited. He had also worked as the Outside Assessor at the Commission Programme Centre of Doordarshan PPC (NE), Guwahati and Imphal and was the former festival director of the North East Film Festival.

== Awards and accolades ==
R.K. Bidur Singh was conferred with the Outstanding Film Activist award by Manipur Film Development Corporation in 1997. He also received the Best Writing on Cinema award for his book Wakhal Machu Machu, Shaktam Makhal Makhal at the Manipur State Film Awards 2013.

In 2008, he won the National Film Award for Best Film Critic at the 56th National Film Awards. The citation for the National Award reads, "For taking the readers to a state little known to our film makers. He understands cinema like few others, bringing with him an open mindset that accepts the plurality of thought. He upholds the cause of regional film makers and his ability to focus on cultural relativity does not leave him even when he talks of international cinema. He loves films and it shows in his works".
