= Namrata Joshi =

Indian film critic based in Mumbai

Namrata Joshi is an Indian film critic based in New Delhi. Originally working for Outlook, she remained there from 1999 till 2015, when she joined The Hindu. She won the National Film Award for Best Film Critic in 2004.

== Career ==
Joshi is an alumnus of the University of Delhi, Film and Television Institute of India and Times Centre for Media Studies. In 1999, she joined Outlook as a special correspondent, and her job involved writing features about films. During her Outlook tenure, she also wrote weekly reviews for Showtime magazine. Joshi won the National Film Award for Best Film Critic in 2004.

After sixteen years in Outlook, she left it to join the Mumbai edition of The Hindu. Joshi also serves as a member of the Indian branch of the International Federation of Film Critics. In 2019, she wrote her first novel titled Reel India, based on her travels across country observing cinema's influence on people.
