= Shoma A. Chatterji =

Indian film scholar, author and freelance journalist

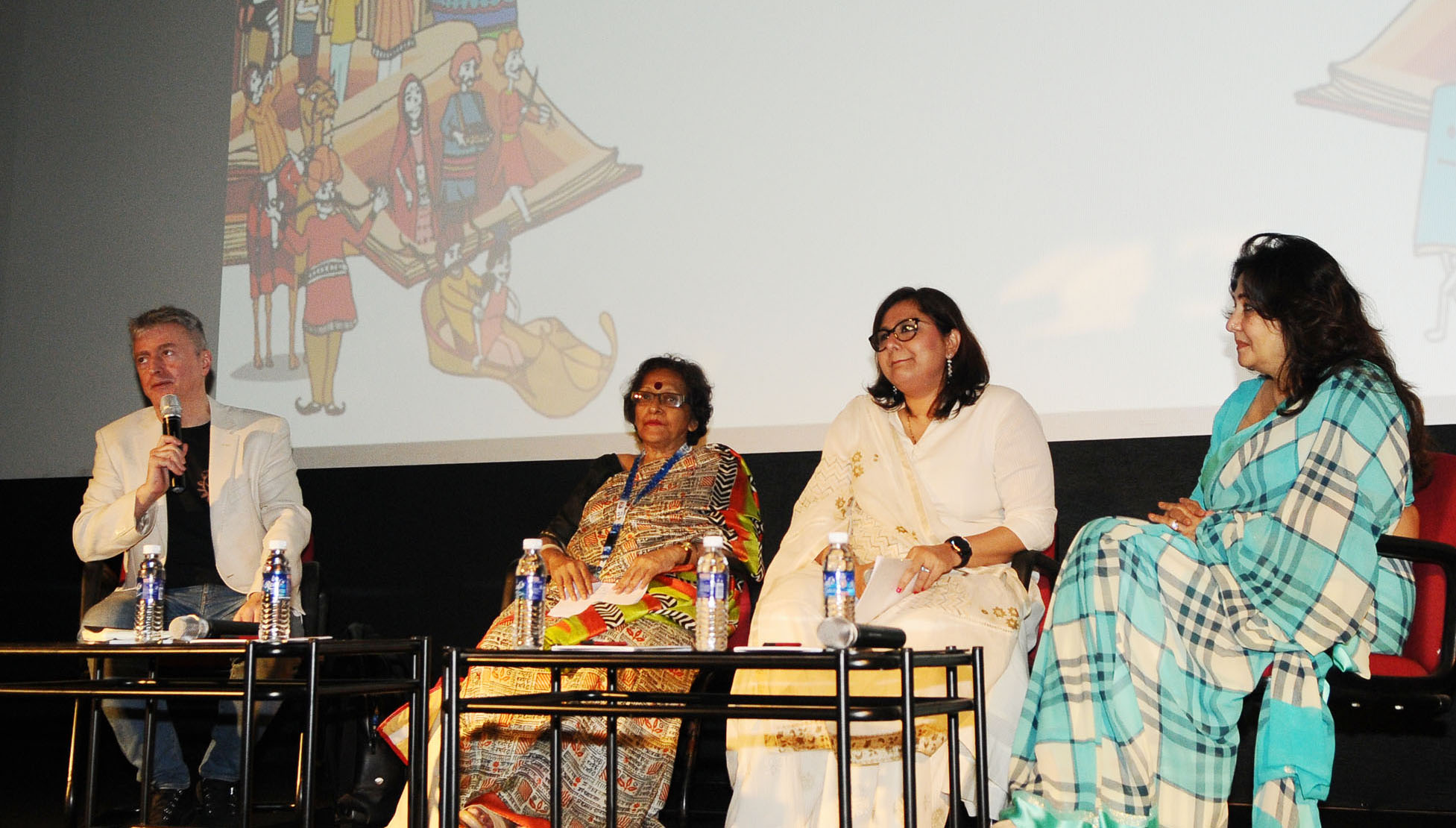
- Chatterji alongside Pablo Cesar and Moon Moon Sen on “Tagore on Celluloid”
- Born: 1943 (age 81–82); Kolkata, India
- Occupation(s): Journalist, film scholar, author
- Years active: 1981–present
- Employers: PSBT; ICSSR
- Awards: National Film Award 1991 Best Film Critic; National Film Award 2003 Best Book on Cinema

Shoma A. Chatterji is an Indian film scholar, author and freelance journalist. She has been the recipient of a number of awards including the National Film Award for Best Film Critic in 1991 and the National Awards for Best Writing on Cinema for her study of the works of Aparna Sen in the publication, Parama and Other Outsiders: The Cinema of Aparna Sen (2002). Notably, she is the only woman to have won both the national awards. She is the author of several biographies including those on Pramathesh Barua, Ritwik Ghatak and Suchitra Sen.

Between 2005–2006, Chatterji was a research fellow at the National Film Archive of India, following which between 2006–2007, she was a senior research fellow at the PSBT Delhi and then a senior research fellow at the Indian Council of Social Science Research between 2009–2011. Born and educated in Mumbai, Chatterji has two Master's degrees in economics and education and a PhD in Indian cinema history. Following her education, she was a lecturer in economics at a local college until 1991.

== Awards ==
- National Film Award for Best Film Critic in 1991 for film criticism in the Bengali language.
- Bengal Film Journalists Association’s Best Critic Award in 1998.
- National Awards for Best Writing on Cinema in 2003 for a study of the works of Aparna Sen.
- Bharat Nirman Award for "excellence in journalism" in 2004.
- UNFPA–Laadli Media Special Award for "consistent writing on women’s issues" in 2009.
- Kalyan Kumar Mitra Award for "excellence in film scholarship and contribution as a film critic" in 2010.
- Lifetime Achievement SAMMAN by the Rotary Club, Calcutta-Metro City in 2012.

== Selected works ==
- The Indian Women's Search for an Identity. (1988) Vikas Publishing House. ISBN 978-0-70-694642-0.
- The Indian Woman in Perspective. (1993) Ajanta Publications. ISBN 978-81-202-0332-7.
- Kamini: And Other Stories. (1997) Alka Publications. ISBN 978-8-12-410520-7.
- Subject-cinema, Object-woman: A Study of the Portrayal of Women in Indian Cinema. (1998)
- Baker's Dozen: Short Stories from India. (2001) Rupa & Company. ISBN 978-81-291-0039-9.
- Parama and Other Outsiders: The Cinema of Aparna Sen. (2002) Parumita Publications. ISBN 978-81-87867-03-6.
- Ritwik Ghatak: The Celluloid Rebel. (2004) Rupa & Company. ISBN 978-81-291-0245-4.
- Women in Black, White, and Technicolour. (2004) Rupa & Company. ISBN 978-81-291-0396-3.
- Sinemā śudhu sinemā naẏa (Movies are not just movies, 2004)
- Mrinal Sen: The Survivor. (2005) Rupa & Company. ISBN 978-81-291-0198-3.
- Goddess Kali of Kolkata. (2005) UBS Publishers. ISBN 978-81-7476-514-7.
- Gender and Conflict. (2006) UBS Publishers. ISBN 978-81-7476-552-9.
- P.C Barua. (2008) Wisdom Tree Publishers. ISBN 978-81-8328-104-1.
- Women in Perspective: Essays on Gender Issues. (2010)
- P.C. Barua: Legends of Indian Cinema. (Vasudev, Aruna, ed; 2011) SCB Distributors. ISBN 978-81-8328-226-0.
- 100 Years of Jump-cuts and Fade-outs: Tracking Change in Indian Cinema. (2014) Rupa & Company. ISBN 978-81-291-2915-4.
- Filming Reality: The Independent Documentary Movement in India. (2015) SAGE Publications. ISBN 978-93-5150-543-3.
- Suchitra Sen: The Legend and the Enigma. (2015) HarperCollins. ISBN 978-93-5177-639-0.
- Woman at the Window: The Material Universe of Rabindranath Tagore Through the Eyes of Satyajit Ray. (2017) HarperCollins. ISBN 978-93-5136-503-7.
- The Cinema of Bimal Roy: An 'Outsider' Within. (2017) SAGE Publications. ISBN 978-93-86062-87-1.
