= 34th National Film Awards (India) =

1987 Indian film award

- Awarded for: Best of Indian cinema in 1986
- Presented by: Directorate of Film Festivals
- Announced on: 1 May 1987
- Presented on: September 1987
- Official website: dff.nic.in

Highlights
- Best Feature Film: Tabarana Kathe
- Best Non-Feature Film: The Land of Sand Dunes
- Best Book: Rabindranath O Chalachithra
- Best Film Critic: Chidananda Dasgupta
- Dadasaheb Phalke Award: Bommireddy Nagi Reddy
- Most awards: • Mirch Masala • Phera (3)

The 34th National Film Awards, presented by Directorate of Film Festivals, the organisation set up by Ministry of Information and Broadcasting, India to felicitate the best of Indian Cinema released in the year 1986. Ceremony took place in September 1987.

== Awards ==
Awards were divided into feature films, non-feature films and books written on Indian cinema.

=== Lifetime Achievement Award ===
Name of Award	Image	Awardee(s)	Awarded As	Awards
Dadasaheb Phalke Award		Bommireddy Nagi Reddy	Film producer	Swarna Kamal, ₹ 1.00,000 and a Shawl

=== Feature films ===
Feature films were awarded at All India as well as regional level. For 34th National Film Awards, a Kannada film, Tabarana Kathe won the National Film Award for Best Feature Film, whereas a Hindi film, Mirch Masala and a Bengali film, Phera won the maximum number of awards (3). Following were the awards given in each category:

==== Juries ====
A committee headed by Bhisham Sahni was appointed to evaluate the feature films awards. Following were the jury members:

- Jury Members
  - Bhisham Sahni (Chairperson) • Ashok Mitran • Jahnu Barua • N. Krishnamoorthy • R. Lakshman • Ramesh Naidu • Sai Paranjpye • Sankar Bhattacharya • Swapan Ghosh • T. Prakash Rao

==== All India Award ====
Following were the awards given:

===== Golden Lotus Award =====
Official Name: Swarna Kamal

All the awardees are awarded with 'Golden Lotus Award (Swarna Kamal)', a certificate and cash prize.

Name of Award	Name of Film	Language	Awardee(s)	Cash prize
Best Feature Film	Tabarana Kathe	Kannada	Producer: Apoorva Chitra	₹ 50,000/-
Best Feature Film	Tabarana Kathe	Kannada	director: Girish Kasaravalli	₹ 25,000/-
Best Feature Film	Citation: For an extremely sensitive probe into the anguish of a helpless individual caught in a bureaucratic web, depicted with great feeling and expertise as he waits for his pension, which arrives too late.			
Best Debut Film of a Director	Yeh Woh Manzil To Nahin	Hindi	Producer and Director: Sudhir Mishra	₹ 25,000/- Each
Best Debut Film of a Director	Citation: For an incisive analysis of history as seen through the eyes of three elderly freedom fighters and its impact on their stand against social injustice in contemporary times.			
Best Film Providing Popular and Wholesome Entertainment	Samsaram Adhu Minsaram	Tamil	Producer: AVM Productions	₹ 40,000/-
Best Film Providing Popular and Wholesome Entertainment	Samsaram Adhu Minsaram	Tamil	Director: Visu	₹ 20,000/-
Best Film Providing Popular and Wholesome Entertainment	Citation: For its entertaining presentation of a complex contemporary social problem – the disintegration of the joint family.			

===== Silver Lotus Award =====
Official Name: Rajat Kamal

All the awardees are awarded with 'Silver Lotus Award (Rajat Kamal)', a certificate and cash prize.

Name of Award	Name of Film	Language	Awardee(s)	Cash prize
Best Film on Other Social Issues	Doore Doore Oru Koodu Koottam	Malayalam	Producer: M. Mani	₹ 30,000/-
Best Film on Other Social Issues	Doore Doore Oru Koodu Koottam	Malayalam	Director: Sibi Malayil	₹ 15,000/-
Best Film on Other Social Issues	Citation: For focussing on the dire need for integrity in the educational system in remote areas in a heart warming film, charmingly narrated.			
Best Direction	Oridathu	Malayalam	G. Aravindan	₹ 20,000/-
Best Direction	Citation: For his masterly and powerful depiction of changing society reeling under the onslaught of technical progress.			
Best Cinematography	Namukku Parkkan Munthiri Thoppukal	Malayalam	Venu	₹ 15,000/-
Best Cinematography	Citation: For the lyrical and brilliant visual presentation.			₹ 15,000/-
Best Cinematography	Amma Ariyan	Malayalam	Venu	₹ 15,000/-
Best Cinematography	Citation: For his powerful and disturbing black and white photography.			₹ 15,000/-
Best Screenplay	Phera	Bengali	Buddhadeb Dasgupta	₹ 10,000/-
Best Screenplay	Citation: For its penetrative and sensitive screenplay depicting the trauma faced by an artist in search of his identity in relation to his professional and personal life.			
Best Actor	Tabarana Kathe	Kannada	Charuhasan	₹ 10,000/-
Best Actor	Citation: For an immensely moving and controlled portrayal of an individual's anguish, as he waits endlessly for justice.			
Best Actress	Nakhakshathangal	Malayalam	Monisha	₹ 10,000/-
Best Actress	Citation: For her portrayal in the film, in which she depicts an entire range of human emotions and gives an extra dimension to the character os Gowri, a village lass destined to love and lose.			
Best Supporting Actor	Mirch Masala	Hindi	Suresh Oberoi	₹ 10,000/-
Best Supporting Actor	Citation: For breathing life into complex feaudal character, who tries to control a destiny beyond his reach.			
Best Supporting Actress	Bhangala Silata	Oriya	Manjula Kanwar	₹ 10,000/-
Best Supporting Actress	Citation: For a startlingly realistic portrayal of an exploited, illiterate woman who lives like a haunted animal, trapped into accepting her ultimate fate.			
Best Child Artist	Phera	Bengali	Aniket Sengupta	₹ 5,000/-
Best Child Artist	Citation: For his lively and poignant portrayal of a young boy who brings new faith and meaning to the life of an aged artiste.			
Best Audiography	Path Bhola	Bengali	• Durga Mitra • Jyoti Prasad Chatterjee	₹ 10,000/-
Best Audiography	Citation: For adding a new dimension to the film by a sensitive employment of sound.			
Best Editing	Mirch Masala	Hindi	Sanjiv Shah	₹ 10,000/-
Best Editing	Citation: For his perfection in creating a smooth flow.			
Best Art Direction	Madhvacharya	Kannada	P. Krishnamoorthy	₹ 10,000/-
Best Art Direction	Citation: For effectively recreating the era of Madhvacharya.			
Best Music Direction	Madhvacharya	Kannada	M. Balamuralikrishna	₹ 10,000/-
Best Music Direction	Citation: For the effective use of classical music blended with folk music.			
Best Male Playback Singer	Lalan Fakir	Bengali	Hemanta Kumar Mukhopadhyay	₹ 10,000/-
Best Male Playback Singer	Citation: For his superb rendering of the traditional songs in his deep and vibrant voice.			
Best Female Playback Singer	Nakhakshathangal ("Manjal Prasadavum")	Malayalam	K. S. Chithra	₹ 10,000/-
Best Female Playback Singer	Citation: For her melodious rendering of songs.			
Best Costume Design	Parinati	Hindi	Prabhat Jha	₹ 10,000/-
Best Costume Design	Citation: For the authenticity in the use of costumes.			
Special Jury Award	Amma Ariyan	Malayalam	John Abraham	₹ 5,000/-
Special Jury Award	Citation: For his directorial excellence and originality in the treatment.			
Special Mention	Himghar	Bengali	Sandip Ray	Certificate only

==== Regional Awards ====
The award is given to best film in the regional languages in India.

Name of Award	Name of Film	Awardee(s)	Cash prize
Best Feature Film in Assamese	Baan	Producer: Do-Re-Me Films	₹ 20,000/-
Best Feature Film in Assamese	Baan	Director: Charu Kamal Hazarika	₹ 10,000/-
Best Feature Film in Assamese	Citation: For its incisive comment on the post-independence establishment in a flood-prone region.		
Best Feature Film in Bengali	Phera	Producer: Buddhadeb Dasgupta	₹ 20,000/-
Best Feature Film in Bengali	Phera	Director: Buddhadeb Dasgupta	₹ 10,000/-
Best Feature Film in Bengali	Citation: For its depiction of dilemma of a creative artiste in a world of changing values.		
Best Feature Film in Hindi	Mirch Masala	Producer: NFDC	₹ 20,000/-
Best Feature Film in Hindi	Mirch Masala	Director: Ketan Mehta	₹ 10,000/-
Best Feature Film in Hindi	Citation: For its moving depiction of a rural woman's struggle against oppressive social conditions in the pre-Independence era.		
Best Feature Film in Kannada	Shankha Nada	Producer: Umesh Kulkarni	₹ 20,000/-
Best Feature Film in Kannada	Shankha Nada	Director: Umesh Kulkarni	₹ 10,000/-
Best Feature Film in Kannada	Citation: For its satirical presentation of the facts of the panchayat system in a faction-ridden village.		
Best Feature Film in Malayalam	Uppu	Producer: K. M. A. Rahim	₹ 20,000/-
Best Feature Film in Malayalam	Uppu	Director: V. K. Pavithran	₹ 10,000/-
Best Feature Film in Malayalam	Citation: For its depiction of people caught in the midst of religious conservatism.		
Best Feature Film in Oriya	Majhi Pahacha	Producer: Dipti Mohanty	₹ 20,000/-
Best Feature Film in Oriya	Majhi Pahacha	Director: Manmohan Mahapatra	₹ 10,000/-
Best Feature Film in Oriya	Citation: For a faithful portrayal of a range of individuals in today's urban milieu.		
Best Feature Film in Tamil	Mouna Ragam	Producer: G. Venkateswaran	₹ 20,000/-
Best Feature Film in Tamil	Mouna Ragam	Director: Mani Ratnam	₹ 10,000/-
Best Feature Film in Tamil	Citation: For its sensitive portrayal of an urban young woman's voyage to self-discovery.		
Best Feature Film in Telugu	Swathi Muthyam	Producer: Edida Nageshwara Rao	₹ 20,000/-
Best Feature Film in Telugu	Swathi Muthyam	Director: K. Viswanath	₹ 10,000/-
Best Feature Film in Telugu	Citation: For an effective rendering of a dramatic story about a man too innocent and child-like to fit into the scheme of the hard, calculating world.		

Best Feature Film in Each of the Language Other Than Those Specified in the Schedule VIII of the Constitution

Name of Award	Name of Film	Awardee(s)	Cash prize
Best Feature Film in English	Watchman	Producer: T. S. Narasimhan	₹ 20,000/-
Best Feature Film in English	Watchman	Director: Shankar Nag	₹ 10,000/-
Best Feature Film in English	Citation: For the charming rendering of the story an old watchman saving a young girl from suicide, himself having lost all his near and dear ones.		

=== Non-Feature Films ===
Short Films made in any Indian language and certified by the Central Board of Film Certification as a documentary/newsreel/fiction are eligible for non-feature film section.

==== Juries ====
A committee headed by Adoor Gopalakrishnan was appointed to evaluate the non-feature films awards. Following were the jury members:

- Jury Members
  - Adoor Gopalakrishnan (Chairperson) • Jalal Agha • Manmohan Shetty • Sivan

==== Golden Lotus Award ====
Official Name: Swarna Kamal

All the awardees are awarded with 'Golden Lotus Award (Swarna Kamal)', a certificate and cash prize.

Name of Award	Name of Film	Language	Awardee(s)	Cash prize
Best Non-Feature Film	The Land of Sand Dunes	English	Producer: Orchid Films Pvt. Ltd. Director: Gautam Ghose	₹ 15,000/- Each
Best Non-Feature Film	Citation: For the sensitivity and feel for the subject expressed in its effective cinematic style.			

==== Silver Lotus Award ====
Official Name: Rajat Kamal

All the awardees are awarded with 'Silver Lotus Award (Rajat Kamal)' and cash prize.

Name of Award	Name of Film	Language	Awardee(s)	Cash prize
Best Anthropological / Ethnographic Film	The Land Where Wind Blows Free	English	Producer: Director of Cultural Affairs, Assam; Director: Chandra Narayan Barua	₹ 10,000/- Each
Best Anthropological / Ethnographic Film	Citation: For its faithful and authentic portrayal of the tribal communities of North-East India.			
Best Biographical Film	Sister Alphonsa of Bharananganam	English	Producer: Dejo Kappen and George Sebastian; Director: Rajiv Vijay Raghavan	₹ 10,000/- Each
Best Biographical Film	Citation: For its creative use of cinematography in portraying with great sympathy and understanding the life of Sister Alphonsa.			₹ 10,000/- Each
Best Biographical Film	Kamala Nehru	English	Producer: Uma Shankar; Director: Ashish Mukherjee	₹ 10,000/- Each
Best Biographical Film	Citation: For the innovative use of graphics in the effective depiction of the subject.			₹ 10,000/- Each
Best Arts / Cultural Film	Our Islamic Heritage – Part II	English	Producer: K. K. Garg for Films Division; Director: K. K. Garg	₹ 10,000/- Each
Best Arts / Cultural Film	Citation: For its well researched treatment and the artistry and imagination employed in bringing an aspect of our great heritage into focus.			₹ 10,000/- Each
Best Arts / Cultural Film	Classical Dance Forms of India – Koodiattam	English	Producer: Doordarshan; Director: Prakash Jha	₹ 10,000/- Each
Best Arts / Cultural Film	Citation: For its excellent visual treatment of a great traditional theatre form.			₹ 10,000/- Each
Best Scientific Film (including Environment and Ecology)	Kaamdhenu Redeemed	English	Producer: Radha Narayanan and Mohi-Ud-Din Mirza; Director: Mohi-Ud-Din Mirza	₹ 10,000/- Each
Best Scientific Film (including Environment and Ecology)	Citation: For its very effective use of cinematographic medium for covering modern scientific methods of cattle breeding.			
Best Industrial Film	The Story of Glass	English	Producer: S. Kumar; Director: Buddhadeb Dasgupta	₹ 10,000/- Each
Best Industrial Film	Citation: For its comprehensive and engaging treatment of glass-making in our country.			
Best Agricultural Film	Three Spices – Cinnamon Part I	English	Producer: D. Gautaman for Films Division; Director: D. Gautaman	₹ 10,000/- Each
Best Agricultural Film	Citation: For its high motivational and educational value.			
Best Historical Reconstruction / Compilation Film	We The People of India	English	Producer: N. S. Thapa for Films Division; Director: Bhanumurthy Alur	₹ 10,000/- Each
Best Historical Reconstruction / Compilation Film	Citation: For creative compilation of historic facts and materials.			
Best Film on Social Issues	Inner Instincts	English	Producer: Ministry of Welfare (India); Director: P. Vijay Kumar	₹ 10,000/- Each
Best Film on Social Issues	Citation: For its sensitive and probing treatment of a vital social issue.			
Best Educational / Motivational Film	Mitraniketan Vellanad	English	Producer: Cinemart Foundation; Director: Jagannath Guha	₹ 10,000/- Each
Best Educational / Motivational Film	Citation: For effectively bringing into focus the services of an institution engaged in tackling the rural problems at the grass roots level.			₹ 10,000/- Each
Best Educational / Motivational Film	For Better Living	English	Producer: Padmalaya Mohapatra and Ghanashyam Mohapatra; Director: Ghanashyam Mohapatra	₹ 10,000/- Each
Best Educational / Motivational Film	Citation: For the competence with which an important social endeavour like the upliftment of the Adivasis is depicted.			₹ 10,000/- Each
Best News Review	The Pope Meets India (News Magazine 70)	English	Producer: P. B. Pendharkar and P. S. Arshi for Films Division; Director: Camera Team for Films Division	₹ 10,000/- Each
Best News Review	Citation: For the excellently co-ordinated team work in making the coverage of the Pope's visit to India more than mere news.			
Best Animation Film	A. B. See	English	Producer: P. B. Pendharkar for Films Division director and Animator: Arun Gongade	₹ 10,000/- Each
Best Animation Film	Citation: For the freshness of treatment using animation technique to effectively convey a message of great social significance.			
Special Jury Award	Equal Partners	English	Yash Chaudhary	₹ 5,000/-
Special Jury Award	Citation: For the deft handling of a complex subject designed to promote better understanding between nations.			

=== Best Writing on Cinema ===
The awards aim at encouraging study and appreciation of cinema as an art form and dissemination of information and critical appreciation of this art-form through publication of books, articles, reviews etc.

==== Juries ====
A committee headed by Vijay Tendulkar was appointed to evaluate the writing on Indian cinema. Following were the jury members:

- Jury Members
  - Vijay Tendulkar (Chairperson) • Dibyendu Palit • S. Jayachandran Nair

==== Silver Lotus Award ====
Official Name: Rajat Kamal

All the awardees are awarded with 'Silver Lotus Award (Rajat Kamal)' and cash prize.

Name of Award	Name of Book	Language	Awardee(s)	Cash prize
Best Book on Cinema	Rabindranath O Chalachithra	Bengali	Author: Arun Kumar Roy	₹5,000/-
Best Book on Cinema	Citation: For making an original evaluation and analysis of films and documentaries made on Tagore's writings and personality from the silent era of cinema to date and thus linking cinema, an important creative medium, to a great creative mind.			
Best Film Critic		Bengali	Chidananda Dasgupta	₹5,000/-
Best Film Critic	Citation: For his unique writings which do not look at films in isolation and instead evaluate them in the context of a total artistic expression as integrated in other forms of arts. This gives most of his writings a broader perspective and depth and links them with social, psychological and historical changes.			

=== Awards not given ===
Following were the awards not given as no film was found to be suitable for the award:

- Second Best Feature Film
- Best Children's Film
- Best Film on Family Welfare
- Best Exploration/Adventure Film
- Best Non-Feature Film on Family Welfare
- Best Feature Film on National Integration
- Best Lyrics
- Best Feature Film in Manipuri
- Best Feature Film in Marathi
- Best Feature Film in Punjabi
- Best Promotional Film
