= 56th National Film Awards =

2010 Indian film award

- Awarded for: Best of Indian cinema in 2008
- Awarded by: Directorate of Film Festivals
- Presented by: Pratibha Patil (President of India)
- Announced on: 23 January 2010
- Presented on: 20 March 2010
- Site: Vigyan Bhawan, New Delhi
- Official website: dff.nic.in

Highlights
- Best Feature Film: Antaheen
- Best Non-Feature Film: AFSPA 1958
- Best Book: Bollywood Melodies
- Best Film Critic: • Altaf Mazid • R. K. Bidur Singh
- Dadasaheb Phalke Award: V. K. Murthy
- Most awards: Jogwa (5)

The 56th National Film Awards, presented by Directorate of Film Festivals, the organisation set up by Ministry of Information and Broadcasting in India to celebrate the best of Indian Cinema released in the year 2008.

Three committees were instituted in order to judge the various entries for feature film, non-feature film and best writing on cinema sections, headed by the National award-winning director, Shaji N. Karun, for feature films and Aruna Raje Patil for non-feature films and Sunil Gangopadhyay for best writing on cinema.

Each chairperson announced the award on 23 January 2010 for their respective sections and award ceremony took place at Vigyan Bhavan, New Delhi with President of India, Pratibha Patil giving away the awards on 20 March 2010.

== Awards ==
Awards were divided into feature films, non-feature films and books written on Indian cinema.

=== Lifetime Achievement Award ===
Name of Award	Image	Awardee(s)	Awarded As	Awards
Dadasaheb Phalke Award		V. K. Murthy	Cinematographer	Swarna Kamal, ₹ 10,00,000 and a Shawl

=== Feature films ===
Feature films were awarded at All India as well as regional level. For 56th National Film Awards, a Bengali film, Antaheen won the National Film Award for Best Feature Film; whereas a Marathi film, Jogwa won the maximum number of awards (5). The following awards were given in each category:

==== Juries ====
A committee headed by Shaji N. Karun was appointed to evaluate the feature films awards. The jury members were:

- Shaji N. Karun (Chairperson) • Roshan Taneja • H. M. Ramachandra • Nagma • Satyabrata Kalita • Neelakanta • Dilip Ghosh • Swapan Mullick • Sudesh Syal • S. K. Srivastava • Archana • B. Shashi Kumar • Subhash Sehgal • Santosh Desai • Sreelekha Mukherji

==== All India Award ====
The following awards were given:

===== Golden Lotus Award =====
Official name: Swarna Kamal

All the awardees are awarded with 'Golden Lotus Award (Swarna Kamal)', a certificate and cash prize.

Name of award	Name of film	Language	Awardee(s)	Cash prize
Best Feature Film	Antaheen	Bengali	Producer: Screenplay Films Pvt. Ltd. Director: Aniruddha Roy Chowdhury	₹ 2,50,000/- Each
Best Feature Film	Citation: For lyrical blend of technical devices in the right proportion to depict shifting human relationships in an urban scenario.			
Best Debut Film of A Director	A Wednesday!	Hindi	Producer: UTV Motion Pictures; Director: Neeraj Pandey	₹ 1,25,000/- Each
Best Debut Film of A Director	Citation: For slick and searing exposure of the tension below the normal rhythm of life and the angst of the common man in Mumbai.			
Best Popular Film Providing Wholesome Entertainment	Oye Lucky! Lucky Oye!	Hindi	Producer: UTV Motion Pictures; Director: Dibakar Banerjee	₹ 2,00,000/- Each
Best Popular Film Providing Wholesome Entertainment	Citation: For its intelligent treatment of an off-beat subject that makes it different within the popular format.			
Best Children's Film	Gubbachigalu	Kannada	Producer: Media House Studio; Director: Abhaya Simha	₹ 1,50,000/- Each
Best Children's Film	Citation: For imaginative portrayal of a magic world that exists in the minds of children.			
Best Animated Film	Roadside Romeo	Hindi	Producer: Aditya Chopra; Director: Jugal Hansraj; Animator: Tata Elxsi/VCL	₹ 1,00,000/- Each
Best Animated Film	Citation: For its technical achievements to further the craft of animation for mainstream audience.			
Best Direction	Naan Kadavul	Tamil	Bala	₹ 2,50,000/-
Best Direction	Citation: For its powerful handling of an extraordinary subject that focuses on marginal characters with great convection.			

===== Silver Lotus Award =====
Official name: Rajat Kamal

All the winners are awarded with 'Silver Lotus Award (Rajat Kamal)', a certificate and cash prize.

Name of award	Name of film	Language	Awardee(s)	Cash prize
Best Feature Film on National Integration	Aai Kot Nai	Assamese	Producer: Rajen Bora; Director: Manju Borah	₹ 1,50,000/- Each
Best Feature Film on National Integration	Citation: For its honest look at a burning problem in Northeast India, its attempt to break down artificial boundaries and giving it a human and aesthetic appeal.			
Best Film on Family Welfare	Little Zizou	English and Gujarati	Producer: Jigri Dost Productions; Director: Sooni Taraporevala	₹ 1,50,000/- Each
Best Film on Family Welfare	Citation: For its witty and intelligent handling of the conflicts and convictions confronting the Parsi community.			
Best Film on Other Social Issues	Jogwa	Marathi	Producer: Shripal Morakhia; Director: Rajeev Patil	₹ 1,50,000/- Each
Best Film on Other Social Issues	Citation: For hard hitting comment on the victims of age old social customs.			
Best Film on Environment / Conservation / Preservation	Jianta Bhoota	Oriya	Producer: Akshay Parija; Director: Prashanta Nanda	₹ 1,50,000/- Each
Best Film on Environment / Conservation / Preservation	Citation: For sensitive portrayal of exploitation of innocence in the name of development.			
Best Actor	Jogwa	Marathi	Upendra Limaye	₹ 50,000/-
Best Actor	Citation: For his restrained yet powerful depiction of a complex character.			
Best Actress	Fashion	Hindi	Priyanka Chopra	₹ 50,000/-
Best Actress	Citation: For convincing portrayal of a whole range of emotions within a single character.			
Best Supporting Actor	Rock On!!	Hindi	Arjun Rampal	₹ 50,000/-
Best Supporting Actor	Citation: For his moving performance as a musician trying to rise above personal tragedy.			
Best Supporting Actress	Fashion	Hindi	Kangana Ranaut	₹ 50,000/-
Best Supporting Actress	Citation: For compelling portrayal of a down and out super model that enriches the impact of the film.			
Best Child Artist	Thanks Maa	Hindi	Shams Patel	₹ 50,000/-
Best Child Artist	Citation: For his very natural depiction of a street child thrown into an unusual situation.			
Best Male Playback Singer	Jogwa ("Jeev Dangla Gungla Rangla")	Marathi	Hariharan	₹ 50,000/-
Best Male Playback Singer	Citation: For his soulful rendition reflecting the agony of unfulfilled emotions.			
Best Female Playback Singer	• Antaheen ("Pherari Mon") • Jogwa ("Jeev Dangla Gungla Rangla")	• Bengali • Marathi	Shreya Ghoshal	₹ 50,000/-
Best Female Playback Singer	Citation: For her wide ranging rendition of human emotions.			
Best Cinematography	Antaheen	Bengali	Cameraman: Abhik Mukhopadhyay; Laboratory Processing: Filmlab, Mumbai	₹ 50,000/- Each
Best Cinematography	Citation: For the poetically captured visuals with inspired use of light and shades to enhanced the mood of the film.			
Best Screenplay	Gandha	Marathi	Sachin Kundalkar	₹ 50,000/-
Best Screenplay	Citation: For its remarkable integration of three different plots using the sense of smell at as a liet motif to focus sensitively on human relationships.			
Best Audiography	Gandha	Marathi	• Pramod J. Thomas • Anmol Bhave	₹ 50,000/-
Best Audiography	Citation: For its use of dramatically scripted sounds to heighten the mood of the film.			
Best Editing	Firaaq	Hindi	A. Sreekar Prasad	₹ 50,000/-
Best Editing	Citation: For aesthetically weaving together unrelated sequences to heighten the dramatic impact.			
Best Art Direction	Firaaq	Hindi	Gautam Sen	₹ 50,000/-
Best Art Direction	Citation: For its perfect use of props and choice of colours to enhance the ambience of a post-riots.			
Best Costume Design	Jodhaa Akbar	Hindi	Neeta Lulla	₹ 50,000/-
Best Costume Design	Citation: For its painstaking detail to recreate the costumes and jewellery of Mughal era.			
Best Make-up Artist	Naan Kadavul	Tamil	U. K. Sasi	₹ 50,000/-
Best Make-up Artist	Citation: For its wide variety of make-up inputs to reflect the large spectrum of characters.			
Best Music Direction	Jogwa	Marathi	Ajay–Atul	₹ 50,000/-
Best Music Direction	Citation: For its well-researched use of traditional and folk music to reinforce the theme of the film.			
Best Lyrics	Antaheen ("Pherari Mon")	Bengali	• Anindya Chatterjee • Chandril Bhattacharya	₹ 50,000/-
Best Lyrics	Citation: For its simple composition of verses to contribute meaningfully to the film.			
Best Special Effects	Mumbai Meri Jaan	Hindi	Govardhan (Tata Elxsi)	₹ 50,000/-
Best Special Effects	Citation: For its stunning use of technical effects of visual shorts to mirror a man-made disaster.			
Best Choreography	Jodhaa Akbar ("Azeem-o-Shaan Shahenshah")	Hindi	• Chinni Prakash • Rekha Prakash	₹ 50,000/-
Best Choreography	Citation: For its extravagant and dreamlike treatment of celebrations on a magnificent scale.			
Special Jury Award	Bioscope	Malayalam	• NFDC (Producer) • K. M. Madhusudhanan (Director)	₹ 62,500/- Each
Special Jury Award	Citation: For its exciting revival of a sincerely personal style to look back on a chapter of history.			

==== Regional Awards ====
The award is given to best film in the regional languages in India.

Name of award	Name of film	Awardee(s)	Cash prize
Best Feature Film in Assamese	Mon Jaai	Producer: Moirangthem Movies; Director: M. Maniram	₹ 1,00,000/- Each
Best Feature Film in Assamese	Citation: For its honest exploration of ethical values confronting the youth.		
Best Feature Film in Bengali	Shob Charitro Kalponik	Producer: Reliance Big Pictures; Director: Rituparno Ghosh	₹ 1,00,000/- Each
Best Feature Film in Bengali	Citation: For its poetic treatment of an individual sensitivities in a crisis.		
Best Feature Film in Hindi	Rock On!!	Producer: Excel Entertainment Pvt. Ltd. Director: Abhishek Kapoor	₹ 1,00,000/- Each
Best Feature Film in Hindi	Citation: For an emotional story of musical bonding.		
Best Feature Film in Kannada	Vimukthi	Producer: Navyachitra Creations; Director: P. Sheshadri	₹ 1,00,000/- Each
Best Feature Film in Kannada	Citation: For exploring different dimension of family ties.		
Best Feature Film in Malayalam	Thirakkatha	Producer: Varnachithra Big Screen; Director: Ranjith	₹ 1,00,000/- Each
Best Feature Film in Malayalam	Citation: For its poignant story of an actress told with sincerity and conviction.		
Best Feature Film in Marathi	Harishchandrachi Factory	Producer: UTV Motion Pictures; Director: Paresh Mokashi	₹ 1,00,000/- Each
Best Feature Film in Marathi	Citation: For its original of stylised recreation of a slice of history.		
Best Feature Film in Tamil	Vaaranam Aayiram	Producer: V. Ravichandran; Director: Gautham Vasudev Menon	₹ 1,00,000/- Each
Best Feature Film in Tamil	Citation: For its engaging depiction of a father and son relationship.		
Best Feature Film in Telugu	1940 Lo Oka Gramam	Producer: N. C. Narasimham; Director: Narasimha Nandi	₹ 1,00,000/- Each
Best Feature Film in Telugu	Citation: For its courageous handling of caste-based prejudices.		

Best Feature Film in Each of the Languages Other Than Those Specified In the Schedule VIII of the Constitution

Name of award	Name of film	Awardee(s)	Cash prize
Best Feature Film in English	Land Gold Women	Producer: Vivek Agrawal; Director: Avantika Hari	₹ 1,00,000/- Each
Best Feature Film in English	Citation: For its intense depiction of the issue of honour killing.		
Best Feature Film in Kokborok	Yarwng	Producer: Joseph Kizhakechennadu; Director: Joseph Pulinthanath	₹ 1,00,000/- Each
Best Feature Film in Kokborok	Citation: For a meaningful story of displaced people looking to rebuild their lives.		
Best Feature Film in Tulu	Gaggara	Producer: M. Durganand; Director: Shivadhwaj Shetty	₹ 1,00,000/- Each
Best Feature Film in Tulu	Citation: For its attempt to preserve traditional folk forms.		

=== Non-feature films ===
Short films made in any Indian language and certified by the Central Board of Film Certification as a documentary/newsreel/fiction are eligible for non-feature film section.

==== Juries ====
A committee headed by Aruna Raje Patil was appointed to evaluate the non-feature films awards. The jury members were:

- Aruna Raje Patil (Chairperson) • Krishnendu Bose • Anirban Dutta • Sandeep Marwah • Reena Mohan • R. V. Ramani • Sarfaraz Siddiqui

==== Golden Lotus Award ====
Official name: Swarna Kamal

All the awardees are awarded with 'Golden Lotus Award (Swarna Kamal)', a certificate and cash prize.

Name of award	Name of film	Language	Awardee(s)	Cash prize
Best Non-Feature Film	AFSPA 1958	Meitei and English	Producer: Bachaspa Timayun Sunzu and Haobam Paban Kumar; Director: Haobam Paban Kumar	₹ 1,00,000/- Each
Best Non-Feature Film	Citation: For a courageous depiction of the non-violent resistance of the people of Manipur to protest against a legislation, which undermines the values of self-respect and the fundamentals of democracy. The documentation process by various crews and the way it is chronicled offers multiple perspectives.			
Best Non-Feature Film Direction	Three of Us	Only Music	Umesh Vinayak Kulkarni	₹ 50,000/-
Best Non-Feature Film Direction	Citation: With immense sensitivity, the film offers a slice of life of a physically challenged person, which transcends into a telling cinematic practice of minimalism and control. A poetic exploration that breathes the indomitable spirit of these real characters playing themselves, way above its bleak mise-en-scene.			

==== Silver Lotus Award ====
Official name: Rajat Kamal

All the awardees are awarded with 'Silver Lotus Award (Rajat Kamal)' and cash prize.

Name of award	Name of film	Language	Awardee(s)	Cash prize
Best First Non-Feature Film	Vitthal	Marathi	Producer: Vinoo Choliparambil and Manu Pushpendran; Director: Vinoo Choliparambil	₹ 1,00,000/- Each
Best First Non-Feature Film	Citation: For a sensitive portrayal of the latent violence building up in a child against the ritualistic social norms which are forced on him. The filmmaker demonstrates maturity and dexterity in handling the script and the actors, bringing out the complexity of a child's mind trapped in a world of adults.			
Best Anthropological / Ethnographic Film	Boliya Pitaier Sohoki Sootal	Assamese	Producer: Altaf Mazid, Zabeen Ahmed and Susanta Roy; Director: Altaf Mazid	₹ 50,000/- Each
Best Anthropological / Ethnographic Film	Citation: For a film which uniquely depicts the long arduous struggle of a community to build check dams using their indigenous engineering skills. An experiential journey which transcends documentation and makes the viewer participate in the process.			
Best Biographical Film	The Assassination Of Rajiv Gandhi – A Reconstruction	English	Producer: Films Division; Director: R. Krishna Mohan	₹ 50,000/- Each
Best Biographical Film	Citation: For traversing vast stretches of time and geographical space, this film deftly puts together strands of information, perception, evidence and historical contexts to reconstruct a compelling narrative about the gruesome assassination of a world leader.			
Best Arts / Cultural Film	Karna Motcham	Tamil	Producer: MGR Film and TV Institute; Director: S. Murali Manohar	₹ 50,000/- Each
Best Arts / Cultural Film	Citation: For using powerful imagery and ironical juxtaposition, the film depicts the life of a Koothu artist. With subtlety, it captures the frustration and the hopelessness of a performer whose art is a misfit in a changing cultural world.			
Best Scientific Film	Trip	English	Producer: Film and Television Institute of India; Director: Emmanuel Palo	₹ 50,000/- Each
Best Scientific Film	Citation: For the film with a simple, almost lighthearted, treatment evolves into a powerful message of conservation. Using an unconventional music track and animation, the film jolts the viewer to relook at waste and pollution.			
Best Promotional Film	Lost and Found	Marathi, English and Hindi	Producer: Harshavardhan G. Kulkarni, Kirti Nakhwa and Amitabh Shukla; Director: Harshavardhan G. Kulkarni	₹ 50,000/- Each
Best Promotional Film	Citation: For using a bottle as a metaphor for a journey of discovery, the filmmaker finds an innovative style to explore various locations through people and their experiences, challenging the classical promotional style of selling tourism.			
Best Agricultural Film	The Land Of Rupshupas	English	Producer: Films Division; Director: A. K. Sidhpuri	₹ 50,000/- Each
Best Agricultural Film	Citation: With breath taking images of the higher Himalayas and the nomadic people living in this harsh climate and terrain, the film effectively explores the relationship of the Rupshupas with their livestock and how critical it is for their survival.			
Best Historical Reconstruction / Compilation Film	The Assassination Of Rajiv Gandhi – A Reconstruction	English	Producer: Films Division; Director: R. Krishna Mohan	₹ 50,000/- Each
Best Historical Reconstruction / Compilation Film	Citation: For traversing vast stretches of time and geographical space, this film deftly puts together strands of information, perception, evidence and historical contexts to reconstruct a compelling narrative about the gruesome assassination of a world leader.			
Best Film on Social Issues	The Female Nude	Hindi	Producer: Public Service Broadcasting Trust; Director: Hemjyotika and Devi Prasad Mishra	₹ 50,000/- Each
Best Film on Social Issues	Citation: For a compelling portrait of a woman who rises above her circumstances in an unconventional way, carving out a position for herself irrespective of how others view her.			₹ 50,000/- Each
Best Film on Social Issues	Buru Gaara	Hindi	Producer: Public Service Broadcasting Trust; Director: Shriprakash	₹ 50,000/- Each
Best Film on Social Issues	Citation: For the journey of two adivasi women from Jharkhand, finding their identity and dignity using language - one through poetry and the other through grassroots journalism. The film creates a space where the narratives of the women emerge as powerful tales of their struggle for empowerment.			₹ 50,000/- Each
Best Educational / Motivational / Instructional Film	Polio Vs. Polio Victims	English, Hindi and Marathi	Producer: Gulshan Sachdeva; Director: Aman Sachdeva	₹ 50,000/- Each
Best Educational / Motivational / Instructional Film	Citation: For an innovative campaign for the eradication of polio - the film follows the polio afflicted who take the initiative for mass awareness by going door to door.			
Best Exploration / Adventure Film	Shingnaba	Meitei	Producer: Bachaspa Timayum Sunzu; Director: Bachaspa Timayum Sunzu	₹ 50,000/- Each
Best Exploration / Adventure Film	Citation: For an inspiring portrayal of an HIV positive person who dramatically transforms his life and becomes a champion body builder. A first person narrative, it provides a new perspective on AIDS and our understanding of sports.			
Best Investigative Film	Distant Rumblings	English	Producer: Ms. Rongsenkala; Director: Bani Prakash Das	₹ 50,000/- Each
Best Investigative Film	Citation: For evoking painful memories of World War II as experienced by people of North East India, after the Japanese invasion. Through war wreckages found in the jungles and first person accounts, the film stitches together a moving story of affected families long forgotten.			
Best Animation Film	Prince And The Crown Of Stones	English	Producer: Children's Film Society; Director: Gautam Benegal; Animator: Gautam Benegal	₹ 50,000/- Each
Best Animation Film	Citation: For a well knit theme-oriented film, complemented by 2D graphics and a restrained colour palette. A strong message about leadership emerges through the film making it relevant to the contemporary times.			
Best Short Fiction Film	Stations	Hindi, Marathi and English	Producer: Film and Television Institute of India; Director: Emmanuel Palo	₹ 50,000/- Each
Best Short Fiction Film	Citation: For weaving a complex contemporary form of expression, through fragmented stories of a few sparsely connected lives in transit, over an omnipresent dark urban reality of economic disparity, alienation, and bad faith.			
Best Film on Family Welfare	Appuvin Nayagan - Spotty (My Hero)	Tamil	Producer: A.V.Anoop; Director: Santosh Sethumadhavan	₹ 50,000/- Each
Best Film on Family Welfare	Citation: For scoring with a very tender story that transforms into a moving portrayal of a child's attachment to her toy and her grandfather's dilemma when he loses it. A sensitive film that offers fresh insights into a child's imagination and needs.			
Best Cinematography	Three Of Us	Only Music	Cameraman: Shariqva Badar Khan; Laboratory Processing: Filmlab, Mumbai	₹ 12,500/- Each
Best Cinematography	Citation: For providing with amazing discipline and sensitivity, an intimate insight into the lives of a small family, living in a confined space, with exquisite use of composition, rhythm, lensing and lighting.			₹ 12,500/- Each
Best Cinematography	When This Man Dies	Hindi, English	Cameraman: Jayakrishna Gummadi; Laboratory Processing: Adlabs Films Ltd.	₹ 12,500/- Each
Best Cinematography	Citation: For using highly sophisticated texture and tonal work, with deep anticipation into the flow and narrative of the film, the cinematography strives to redefine ways of image making and experience.			₹ 12,500/- Each
Best Audiography	Children Of The Pyre	Hindi	Re-recordist: Mateen Ahmad	₹ 50,000/-
Best Audiography	Citation: With multiple layers of sound, and the incessant crackle of funeral pyres that cease to sleep, the film grips its audience with a sense of entrapment around the life of children working inside a cremation ground. It is a telling example of digetic sound design keeping its truth to the reality of the location.			
Best Editing	Stations	Hindi, Marathi and English	Manoj Kannoth	₹ 50,000/-
Best Editing	Citation: For a delicately interwoven edit of three sparsely connected contemporary urban tales of alienation. Developing a rhythm with parallel and simultaneous stories, the cutting sculpts an extremely powerful contemporary form.			
Best Music Direction	Narmeen	Hindi and Punjabi	Vipin Mishra	₹ 50,000/-
Best Music Direction	Citation: For a sensitive and evocative musical score, with an amazing use of the violin ensemble, which is both a deeply personal and universal experience.			
Best Narration / Voice Over	Sana Keithel	English	Elangbam Natasha	₹ 50,000/-
Best Narration / Voice Over	Citation: For a gentle and intimate voice which leads you to a great treasure house of insights on markets run by women in Manipur.			
Special Jury Award	Children Of The Pyre	Hindi	Rajesh S. Jala (Director)	₹ 50,000/-
Special Jury Award	Citation: Constrained by the stifling and searing world of children working in cremation grounds, the film helps them to recreate a world of their own. The director captures rare reflexive moments of the children and makes the viewers live their pain, joys and dreams.			
Special Mention	Vitthal	Marathi	Aniket Rumade (Child actor)	Certificate Only
Special Mention	Citation: For his excellent portrayal of a young boy, Vitthal, dealing with ritualistic norms forced on him and his struggle to contain the anger brewing within.			

=== Best Writing on Cinema ===
The awards aim at encouraging study and appreciation of cinema as an art form and dissemination of information and critical appreciation of this art-form through publication of books, articles, reviews etc.

==== Juries ====
A committee headed by Sunil Gangopadhyay was appointed to evaluate the writing on Indian cinema. The jury members were:

- Sunil Gangopadhyay (Chairperson) • Sudhish Pachauri • Zia-us Salam

==== Golden Lotus Award ====
Official name: Swarna Kamal

All the awardees are awarded with 'Golden Lotus Award (Swarna Kamal)' and cash prize.

Name of award	Name of book	Language	Awardee(s)	Cash prize
Best Book on Cinema	Bollywood Melodies	English	Author: Ganesh Anantharaman; Publisher: Penguin Books India Pvt. Ltd.	₹ 75,000/- Each
Best Book on Cinema	Citation: For sailing down the mainstream of Hindi film music but manages to find rivulets of solace all his own. He blends substance with style, taking care not to appear too profound or flimsy. He brings out the lesser known aspects of popular Hindi film songs thereby infusing them with fresh dignity. Ganesh delves into the ragas of film songs, keeping some space for little banter between artists.			
Best Film Critic		English and Assamese	Altaf Mazid	₹ 37,500/- Each
Best Film Critic	Citation: For a straight laced expression marks Altaf Mazid's works. His simple narration of subjects is backed up by a researcher's keen eye. He talks of the specific in a universally acceptable manner. No flourishes, he focuses on Assamese film industry with steadfastness and perseverance. Quite appropriately too, for an industry that is now celebrating its Platinum jubilee.			₹ 37,500/- Each
Best Film Critic		Meitei	R. K. Bidur Singh	₹ 37,500/- Each
Best Film Critic	Citation: For taking the readers to a state little known to our film makers. He understands cinema like few others, bringing with him an open mindset that accepts the plurality of thought. He upholds the cause of regional film makers and his ability to focus on cultural relativity does not leave him even when he talks of international cinema. He loves films and it shows in his works.			₹ 37,500/- Each

==== Special mention ====
All the award winners are awarded with Certificate of Merit.

Name of award	Name of book	Language	Awardee(s)	Cash prize
Special Mention (Book on Cinema)	The Director's Mind	English	Ujjal Chakraborty	Certificate Only
Special Mention (Book on Cinema)	Citation: For giving a fresh insight into the works of timeless luminaries. That is no mean achievement considering Ujjal talks of works of some of biggest film makers. Rather than confusing the readers with technical jargon, Ujjal brings to the fore the ethos of film making, revealing the masterpieces of past Masters.			

=== Awards not given ===
The following awards were not given as no film was found to be suitable:

- Best Feature Film in Manipuri
- Best Environment / Conservation / Preservation Film
- Best Feature Film in Oriya
- Best Feature Film in Punjabi
