= National Film Award for Best Scientific Film =

Indian film award

- National award for contributions to short film
- Sponsored by: Directorate of Film Festivals
- Formerly called: Best Scientific Film (including Environment and Ecology) (1984–90)
- Rewards: Rajat Kamal (Silver Lotus); ₹50,000
- First award: 1984
- Final award: 2021
- Most recent winner: Ethos of Darkness

Highlights
- Total awarded: 21
- First winner: Aranya Aamar

The National Film Award for Best Scientific Film was one of the National Film Awards presented annually by the Directorate of Film Festivals, the organisation set up by Ministry of Information and Broadcasting, India. It was one of several awards presented for non-feature films and awarded with Rajat Kamal (Silver Lotus).

The award was instituted in 1984, at 32nd National Film Awards and awarded annually for the short films produced in the year across the country, in all Indian languages. At the 70th National Film Awards, the award is discontinued and clubbed with National Film Award for Best Investigative Film, National Film Award for Best Promotional Film, National Film Award for Best Educational/Motivational/Instructional Film, National Film Award for Best Exploration/Adventure Film, National Film Award for Best Anthropological/Ethnographic Film, National Film Award for Best Agriculture Film and National Film Award for Best Film on Social Issues and National Film Award for Best Non-Feature Environment/Conservation/Preservation Film, and two new categories were created; Best Documentary and Best Non Feature Film Promoting Social and Environmental Values.

== Winners ==
Award includes 'Rajat Kamal' (Silver Lotus) and cash prize. Following are the award winners over the years:

Awards legends
Indicates a joint award for that year

List of films, showing the year, language(s), producer(s) and director(s)
Year	Film(s)	Language(s)	Producer(s)	Director(s)	Refs.
1984 (32nd)	Aranya Aamar	Bengali	West Bengal Ministry of Forest	Tarun Majumdar	
1985 (33rd)	Power to the People	English	B. N. Mehra	K. Balakrishnan Nair	
1986 (34th)	Kaamdhenu Redeemed	English	• Radha Narayanan • Mohi-Ud-Din Mirza	Mohi-Ud-Din Mirza	
1987 (35th)	A Cooperative for Snake Catchers	English	Eco Media Pvt Ltd	• Romulus Whitaker • Shekar Dattatri	
1988 (36th)	Reconstructive Surgery Leprosy (Hand)	English	Jal Mehta	Anil Revankar	
1989 (37th)	Neuropathic Foot in Leprosy	English	Jal Mehta	Vishram Revankar	
1990 (38th)	Biotechnology: Some Possibilities	English	Gul Bahar Singh for Films Division	Nishith Banerjee	
1991 (39th)	Silent Valley: An Indian Rain forest	English	Eco Media Pvt Ltd	• Shekar Dattatri • Revati Mukherjee	
1992 (40th)	Chunauti	Marathi	D. G. Information and Public Relations, Government of Maharashtra	Dinkar Chowdhary	
1993 (41st)	No Award				
1994 (42nd)	Another Way of Learning	English	Comet Media Foundation	Chandita Mukherjee	
1995 (43rd)	A Celestial Tryst (N. M. No. 291)	English	Y. N. Engineer for Films Division	Y. N. Engineer for Films Division	
1996 (44th)	No Award				
1997 (45th)	Ayurveda	English	D. Gautaman for Films Division	Bhanumurthy Alur	
1997 (45th)	Cancer	Hindi	Bhanumurthy Alur for Films Division	C. K. M. Rao	
1998 (46th)	No Award				
1999 (47th)	No Award				
2000 (48th)	Vedic Mathematics	English	Bhanumurthy Alur for Films Division	K. Jagjivan Ram for Films Division	
2001 (49th)	No Award				
2002 (50th)	No Award				
2003 (51st)	The 18 Elephant: Three Monologues†	Malayalam	Savithri Divakaran	P. Balan	
2004 (52nd)	Timeless Traveller-The Horseshoe Crab†	English	Riverbank Studios	Gautam Pandey	
2005 (53rd)	Under This Sun†	Bengali	Nilanjan Bhattacharya	Nilanjan Bhattacharya	
2006 (54th)	Kalpavriksha: Legacy of Forests†	English	Mike Pandey	Nina Subramani	
2007 (55th)	No Award				
2008 (56th)	Trip	English	FTII	Emmanuel Palo	
2009 (57th)	No Award				
2010 (58th)	Heart to Heart	Manipuri and English	Rotary Club of Imphal	Bachaspatimayum Sunzu	
2011 (59th)	No Award				
2012 (60th)	No Award				
2013 (61st)	The Pad Piper	English	Akanksha Sood Singh	Akanksha Sood Singh	
2014 (62nd)	No Award				
2015 (63rd)	No Award				
2016 (64th)	No Award				
2017 (65th)	No Award				
2018 (66th)	G. D. Naidu: The Edison of India	English	Films Division of India	K. Ranjith Kumar	
2019 (67th)	No Award				
2020 (68th)	On the Brink Season 2 – Bats	English	The Gaia People	Akanksha Sood Singh	
2021 (69th)	Ethos of Darkness		Sri Ganesh Productions	Avijit Banerjee	
