= National Film Award for Best Debut Film of a Director =

Indian film award

- National award for contributions to Indian Cinema
- Awarded for: Best debutant directorial work of a year
- Sponsored by: National Film Development Corporation of India
- Formerly called: Award for Best First Film of a Director (1980–1983); Indira Gandhi Award for Best First Film of a Director (1984–2009); Indira Gandhi Award for Best Debut Film of a Director (2010–2021)
- Rewards: Swarna Kamal (Golden Lotus); ₹3,00,000
- First award: 1980
- Most recent winner: Randeep Hooda, Swatantrya Veer Savarkar (2024)

The National Film Award for Best Debut Film of a Director is one of the National Film Awards presented annually by the National Film Development Corporation of India. It is one of several awards presented for feature films and awarded with Golden Lotus (Swarna Kamal).

The award was instituted in 1980, at 28th National Film Awards and has been awarded annually for films produced in the year across the country, in all Indian languages; Hindi (12 awards), Bengali and Malayalam (9 awards each), Tamil (5 awards), Marathi (4 awards), Assamese, English and Telugu (2 awards each), Haryanvi, Jasari, Karbi and Ladakhi (1 award each).

The award includes 'Golden Lotus Award' (Swarna Kamal) and cash prize. Until 69th edition, the award was given to director and producer. The name was shortened to Best Debut Film of a Director since 70th National Film Awards, and the director alone is awarded. The prize money was increased to ₹3,00,000.

== Winners ==
Indicates a joint award for that year

=== 1980–2021 ===
List of award films, showing the year (award ceremony), language(s), producer(s) and director(s)
Year	Film(s)	Language(s)	Producer(s)	Director(s)	Refs.
1980 (28th)	Maina Tadanta	Bengali	–	Utpalendu Chakrabarty	
1981 (29th)	Aadharshila	Hindi	Ashok Ahuja	Ashok Ahuja	
1982 (30th)	Kann Sivanthaal Mann Sivakkum	Tamil	R. Venkat Raman	Sreedhar Rajan	
1983 (31st)	Jaane Bhi Do Yaaro	Hindi	NFDC	Kundan Shah	
1984 (32nd)	Meendum Oru Kaathal Kathai	Tamil	Radhika Pothan	Prathap K. Pothan	
1985 (33rd)	New Delhi Times	Hindi	P. K. Tiwari	Romesh Sharma	
1986 (34th)	Yeh Woh Manzil To Nahin	Hindi	Sudhir Mishra	Sudhir Mishra	
1987 (35th)	Ekti Jiban	Bengali	Chalchitra	Raja Mitra	
1988 (36th)	Trishagni	Hindi	Nabendu Ghosh	Nabendu Ghosh	
1989 (37th)	Wosobipo	Karbi	Karbi Anglong District Council	Gautam Bora	
1990 (38th)	Perumthachan	Malayalam	G. Jayakumar	Ajayan	
1991 (39th)	Haladhar	Assamese	Geeti Barua and Dwijen Hazorika	Sanjeev Hazorika	
1992 (40th)	Miss Beatty's Children	English	NFDC, Doordarshan and Rooks AV	Pamela Rooks	
1993 (41st)	Sunya Theke Suru	Bengali	H. Das, Madhumanti Maitra and M. Das	Ashoke Viswanathan	
1994 (42nd)	Mogamul	Tamil	J. Dharmambal	Gnana Rajasekaran	
1995 (43rd)	Kahini	Bengali	Chandramala Bhattacharya and Malaya Bhattacharya	Malaya Bhattacharya	
1996 (44th)	Rag Birag	Assamese	Bhabhen Baruah and Khanin Baruah	Bidyut Chakraborty	
1997 (45th)	Bhoothakkannadi	Malayalam	Nair Krishnakumar Unni	A. K. Lohithadas	
1998 (46th)	Daya	Malayalam	C. K. Gopinath	Venu	
1999 (47th)	Dollar Dreams	English	Sekhar Kammula	Sekhar Kammula	
1999 (47th)	Laado	Haryanvi	Kumud Chaudhary	Ashwini Chaudhary	
2000 (48th)	Sayahnam	Malayalam	M. S. Nazeer	R. Sarath	
2001 (49th)	Thilaadanam	Telugu	NFDC	K. N. T. Sastry	
2002 (50th)	Patalghar	Bengali	Niti Sonee Gourisaria	Abhijit Chaudhuri	
2002 (50th)	Prohor	Bengali	Debjani Gupta	Subhadro Chaudhary	
2003 (51st)	Margam	Malayalam	Rajiv Vijay Raghavan	Rajiv Vijay Raghavan	
2004 (52nd)	Grahanam	Telugu	N. Anji Reddy	Mohan Krishna Indraganti	
2005 (53rd)	Parineeta	Hindi	Vidhu Vinod Chopra	Pradeep Sarkar	
2006 (54th)	Eakantham	Malayalam	Anthony Joseph	Madhu Kaithapram	
2006 (54th)	Kabul Express	Hindi	Aditya Chopra	Kabir Khan	
2007 (55th)	Frozen	Hindi / Ladakhi	Shivajee Chandrabhushan	Shivajee Chandrabhushan	
2008 (56th)	A Wednesday!	Hindi	UTV Motion Pictures	Neeraj Pandey	
2009 (57th)	Lahore	Hindi	Vivek Khatkar	Sanjay Puran Singh Chauhan	
2010 (58th)	Baboo Band Baaja	Marathi	Nita Jadhav	Rajesh Pinjani	
2011 (59th)	Aaranya Kaandam	Tamil	S. P. Charan	Thiagarajan Kumararaja	
2012 (60th)	Chittagong	Hindi	Bedabrata Pain	Bedabrata Pain	
2012 (60th)	101 Chodyangal	Malayalam	Thomas Kottackkakom	Sidhartha Siva	
2013 (61st)	Fandry	Marathi	Navalkha Arts and Holy Basil Combine	Nagraj Manjule	
2014 (62nd)	Asha Jaoar Majhe	Bengali	For Films and Salaam Cinema	Aditya Vikram Sengupta	
2015 (63rd)	Masaan	Hindi	Phantom Films	Neeraj Ghaywan	
2016 (64th)	Alifa	Bengali	Amaan Ahmed	Deep Choudhury	
2017 (65th)	Sinjar	Jasari	Shibu G. Suseelan	Pampally	
2018 (66th)	Naal	Marathi	Nagraj Manjule	Sudhakar Reddy Yakkanti	
2019 (67th)	Helen	Malayalam	Vineeth Sreenivasan	Mathukutty Xavier	
2020 (68th)	Mandela	Tamil	S. Sashikanth	Madonne Ashwin	
2021 (69th)	Meppadiyan	Malayalam	Unni Mukundan Films	Vishnu Mohan	

=== 2022–present ===
Since the 70th National Film Awards, director alone is awarded.

List of award films, showing the year (award ceremony), language(s), and director(s)
Year	Film(s)	Language(s)	Director(s)	Refs.
2022 (70th)	Fouja	Haryanvi	Pramod Kumar	
2023 (71st)	Aatmapamphlet	Marathi	Ashish Avinash Bende	
2024 (72nd)	Swatantrya Veer Savarkar	Hindi	Randeep Hooda	
