= National Film Award for Best Non-Feature Film on Family Welfare =

Indian film award

Best Non-Feature Film on Family Welfare
- National award for contributions to short film
- Sponsored by: Directorate of Film Festivals
- Rewards: Rajat Kamal (Silver Lotus); ₹50,000
- First award: 1982
- Final award: 2021
- Most recent winner: Chand Saanse

Highlights
- Total awarded: 31
- First winner: Kal Aur Aaj

The National Film Award for Best Non-Feature Film on Family Welfare was one of the National Film Awards presented annually by the Directorate of Film Festivals, the organisation set up by Ministry of Information and Broadcasting, India. It was one of several awards presented for Non-Feature Films and awarded with 'Rajat Kamal' (Silver Lotus).

The award was instituted in 1982, at 30th National Film Awards and awarded annually for short films produced in the year across the country, in all Indian languages. It was discontinued from the 70th National Film Awards.

== Awards ==
Award includes 'Rajat Kamal' (Silver Lotus Award) and cash prize. Cash prize amount varied over the period. Following table illustrates the cash prize amount over the years:

Year (Period)	Cash prize
1982 –2005	Producer and Director: Rajat Kamal and ₹10,000 (US$110) Each
2006–2021	Producer and Director: Rajat Kamal and ₹50,000 (US$530) Each

=== Winners ===
Following are the award winners over the years:

Indicates a joint award for that year

List of films, showing the year, language(s), producer(s) and director(s)
Year	Film(s)	Language(s)	Producer(s)	Director(s)	Refs.
1982 (30th)	Kal Aur Aaj	Hindi	Vimala Swaminathan	Vimala Swaminathan	
1983 (31st)	No Award				
1984 (32nd)	Sweekar	Hindi	Bal Mehta	Vishram Revankar	
1984 (32nd)	Geeli Meetti	Hindi	Women and Social Welfare Ministry	Sanjay Kak	
1985 (33rd)	Bai	Marathi	• Streevani • Ishvani	Sumitra Bhave	
1986 (34th)	No Award				
1987 (35th)	No Award				
1988 (36th)	Lacchmi	Hindi	K. K. Garg for Films Division	Om Prakash Sharma	
1988 (36th)	Nirnay	Hindi	B. R. Shedge for Films Division	R. R. Swamy	
1989 (37th)	Boy or Girl — How?	Hindi	B. R. Shendge	R. R. Swamy	
1990 (38th)	No Award				
1991 (39th)	A Matter of Motherhood	English	Rajiv Mehrotra	Rajiv Mehrotra	
1992 (40th)	Suno Bahu Rani	Hindi	Om Prakash Sharma for Films Division	K. K. Kapil	
1993 (41st)	Taveez	Hindi	Rajeev Mohan for Films Division	Purushottam Berde for Films Division	
1994 (42nd)	Clint	• Malayalam • English	Shiva Kumar	Shiva Kumar	
1995 (43rd)	Soch Samajh Ke	Hindi	• Shanta Gokhle • Arun Khopkar	Arun Khopkar	
1996 (44th)	Bhit	Bengali	• Films Division • K. R. G. Films	Glbahar Singh	
1997 (45th)	The Saviour	Hindi	Shaila Paralkar	Shaila Paralkar	
1997 (45th)	Banglar Baul	Bengali	Yash Chaudhary	K. G. Das	
1998 (46th)	N. M. No. 367 – Sentence of Silence	English	Y. N. Engineer for Films Division	Joshy Joseph for Films Division	
1999 (47th)	No Award				
2000 (48th)	Akkareninnu	Malayalam	• T. Sunil Kumar • Susmitham • Pallimalkunnu	• T. Sunil Kumar • Susmitham • Pallimalkunnu	
2000 (48th)	Mahananda	Bengali	Films Division	Madhuchhanda Sengupta	
2001 (49th)	Sayante Thinte Padavukal	Malayalam	Ratheesh Ramayya	Satheesh Venganoor	
2002 (50th)	Dhatri Panna	Hindi	• Films Division • Ministry of Health and Family Welfare	Gul Bahar Singh	
2003 (51st)	No Award				
2004 (52nd)	Saanjh	Hindi	Tripurari Sharan for Film and Television Institute of India	Jasmine Kaur	
2005 (53rd)	No Award				
2006 (54th)	No Award				
2007 (55th)	Making The Face	English	Public Service Broadcasting Trust	Suvendu Chatterjee	
2008 (56th)	Appuvin Nayagan – Spotty (My Hero)	Tamil	A.V. Anoop	Madhavan	
2009 (57th)	No Award				
2010 (58th)	Love in India	• Bengali • English	Overdose	Kaushik Mukherjee	
2011 (59th)	Red Building where the Sun Sets	English	• Syed Sultan Ahmed • Tabassum Modi	Revathi	
2012 (60th)	After Glow	• English • Gujarati	FTII	Kaushal Oza	
2013 (61st)	Heyro Party	Bengali	• Baishakhi Banerjee • Deepak Gawade	Deepak Gawade	
2014 (62nd)	Towards the Silver Lining	English	Satyajit Ray Film and Television Institute	Bhabani Tamuli	
2015 (63rd)	Best Friends Forever	English	Syed Sultan Ahmed (Edumedia India)	Sandeep Modi	
2016 (64th)	Little Magician	English	Syed Sultan Ahmed	Neha Sharma	
2017 (65th)	Happy Birthday		FTII	Medhpranav Babasaheb Powar	
2018 (66th)	Chalo Jeete Hain		Sundial Ventures Pvt. Ltd.	Mangesh Hadavale	
2019 (67th)	Oru Paathiraa Swapnam Pole	Malayalam	Satyajit Ray Film and Television Institute	Sharan Venugopal	
2020 (68th)	Kumkumarchan (Worship of the Goddess)	Marathi	Studio Filmy Monks	Abhijeet Arvind Dalvi	
2021 (69th)	Chand Saanse	Hindi	Chandrakant Kulkarni	Pratima Joshi	
