= National Film Award for Best Film Critic =

Indian film award

- National award for contributions to writing about Indian Cinema
- Sponsored by: Directorate of Film Festivals
- Rewards: Swarna Kamal (Golden Lotus); ₹1,00,000
- First award: 1984
- Most recent winner: Utpal Datta

The National Film Award for Best Film Critic is one of the National Film Awards presented annually by the Directorate of Film Festivals, the organisation set up by Ministry of Information and Broadcasting, India. It is one of several awards presented for feature films and awarded with Swarna Kamal (Golden Lotus).

The award was instituted in 1984, at 32nd National Film Awards and awarded annually for films produced in the year across the country, in all Indian languages.

== Winners ==
Award includes 'Swarna Kamal' (Golden Lotus) and cash prize. Following are the award winners over the years:

Awards legends
Indicates a joint award for the year

List of award recipients, showing the year and language(s)
Year	Recipient(s)	Language(s)	Refs.
1984 (32nd)	Swapan Mallick	English	
1985 (33rd)	No Award		
1986 (34th)	Chidananda Dasgupta	Bengali	
1987 (35th)	Brajeshwar Madan	Hindi	
1988 (36th)	Manmohan Chadha	Hindi	
1989 (37th)	K. N. T. Sastry	Telugu	
1990 (38th)	Shoma A. Chatterjee	Bengali	
1991 (39th)	Gautam Kaul	English	
1992 (40th)	Sudhir Bose	Bengali	
1993 (41st)	Pritiman Sarkar	Bengali	
1994 (42nd)	Rashmi Doraiswamy	English	
1995 (43rd)	M. C. Raja Narayanan	English and Malayalam	
1996 (44th)	M. K. Raghavendra	English	
1997 (45th)	Deepa Gahlot	English	
1998 (46th)	Meenakshi Shedde	English	
1999 (47th)	I. Shanmughadas	Malayalam	
2000 (48th)	Vasiraju Prakasam	Telugu	
2000 (48th)	Suresh Sharma	Hindi	
2001 (49th)	Vinod Anupam	Hindi	
2002 (50th)	Utpal Borpujari	English	
2003 (51st)	Saibal Chatterjee	English	
2004 (52nd)	Namrata Joshi	English	
2005 (53rd)	Baradwaj Rangan	English	
2006 (54th)	G. P. Ramachandran	Malayalam	
2006 (54th)	Rafique A. R. Baghdadi	English	
2007 (55th)	V. K. Joseph	Malayalam	
2008 (56th)	Altaf Mazid	English and Assamese	
2008 (56th)	R. K. Bidur Singh	Meitei	
2009 (57th)	C. S. Venkiteswaran	Malayalam	
2010 (58th)	Joshy Joseph	English	
2010 (58th)	N. Manu Chakravarthy	Kannada and English	
2011 (59th)	Manoj Barpujari	Assamese and English	
2012 (60th)	P. S. Radhakrishnan	Malayalam	
2013 (61st)	Alaka Sahani	English	
2014 (62nd)	Tanul Thakur	English	
2015 (63rd)	Meghachandra Kongbam	Meitei	
2016 (64th)	G. Dhananjayan	Tamil	
2017 (65th)	Giridhar Jha	English	
2018 (66th)	Blais Johny	Malayalam	
2018 (66th)	Anant Vijay	Hindi	
2019 (67th)	Sohini Chattopadhyay	English	
2020 (68th)	No Award		
2021 (69th)	Purushothama Charyulu	Telugu	
2022 (70th)	Deepak Dua	Hindi	
2023 (71st)	Utpal Datta	Assamese	
