= Altaf Mazid =

Indian documentary filmmaker, critic, director, producer (c. 1957 – 2016)

- Born: Altaf Mazid Rija c. 1957; Guwahati, India
- Died: April 13, 2016 (aged 59); Bengaluru, India
- Other name: Rija
- Occupations: Documentary filmmaker; critic; director; producer
- Spouse: Dr Zabeen Ahmed
- Children: 1
- Awards: Full list

Altaf Mazid Rija (c. 1957 – 13 April 2016), known professionally as Altaf Mazid, was an Indian documentary filmmaker and critic in the Assamese cinema. He also worked as a film producer and director in Jollywood. His last documentary was Sabin Alun (The Broken Song) that revolves around the Karbi people. He was later nominated to juries of film festivals, including 10th International Documentary Film Festival Amsterdam and the 9th Dubai International Film Festival, among others.

He was born around 1957 in Guwahati, India. He served as an executive engineer in Assam at the Department of Public Health Engineering. He had one daughter. His wife, Dr Zabeen Ahmed, is a former librarian of Cotton University, Assam.

== Career ==
Before his debut in filmmaking career, he initially worked as a film critic in Assamese cinema. He also served as a jury of various film festivals such as 1992 International Film Festival of India, 1997 Yamagata International Documentary Film Festival, 7th Bengaluru International Film Festival and 2015 International Film Festival of Kerala. Later, he was appointed as a jury-member by the International Federation of Film Critics in 2014 at Moscow International Film Festival. Prior to this, he served jury of Cannes Film Festival. In 1999, he was appointed by the International Film Festival of India as a member of the selection committee.

He screened digital version of Joymoti, the first Assamese film and presented it at film festivals, including Seventh Asiatica Film Mediale at Rome Film Festival.

== Filmography ==
#	Title	Year	Type/Credited as	Ref.
1	Byoktigata Aru Goponio	1992	—N/a	
2	Jibon	1998	—N/a	
3	Lakhtokiat Golam	2001	—N/a	
4	Our Common Future	2002	—N/a	
5	The Joy of Giving	2004	—N/a	
6	Las Vegasat	2004	—N/a	
7	Bhal Khabar	2005	—N/a	
8	Crazy on the Rocks	2007	—N/a	
9	Kunir Kutil Dosha	2008	—N/a	
10	Boliya Pitair Sohoki Sotal	2008	—N/a	
11	Chitra Sutram	2010	—N/a	
12	Rahashyar Bitchaku	—N/a	—N/a	
13	Kunir Kutil Dosha	—N/a	Director	
14	Boliya Pitaier Sohoki Sootal	2009	Director	
15	Sabin Alun (The Broken Song)	2016	Director	

== Awards and nominations ==
Year	Nominated work	Award	Category	Result	Ref.
2000	Jibon (1998)	Pyongyang International Film Festival	Best Director	Won	
2008	Bollywood Melodies	National Film Awards	Best Film Critic	Won	
2008	Boliya Pitaier Sohoki Sootal	National Film Awards	Best Anthropological/Ethnographic Film	Won	

== Death ==
Altaf Mazid died of myocardial infarction on 13 April 2016 in Bengaluru, India.
