= Oinam Doren =

- Born: Manipur, India
- Occupation(s): Filmmaker; documentary director
- Known for: Songs of Mashangva; My Name is Eeooow; Theatre of the Earth
- Awards: Best Ethnographic Film – 58th National Film Awards (for Songs of Mashangva)

Oinam Doren (ꯑꯣꯏꯅꯥꯝ ꯗꯣꯔꯦꯟ) is an Indian filmmaker and National Award winner known for his films that explore music, culture, and traditions of Manipur and other northeastern Indian states.

== Career ==
Doren’s work is inspired by his interest in music. His early exposure to Western rock and pop influenced his artistic perspective, which later evolved after discovering folk music from Manipur.

=== Songs of Mashangva ===
Doren directed the documentary Songs of Mashangva, which won the Rajat Kamal plaque under the Best Ethnographic category at the 58th National Film Awards 2011. It was selected for the 18th edition of the Lessinia Film Festival in the "Competition" category and was shown in Bosco Chiesanuova, Italy in August 2012. It follows folk musician Rewben Mashangva on a two-year tour across India and through remote villages of the Tangkhul people in Manipur. The film highlights the cultural exchange between Doren, a Meitei from the valley, and Rewben, a Tangkhul from the hills. Doren described the project as a transformative experience that deepened his understanding of rural communities and folk traditions.

=== My Name is Eeooow ===
Doren directed My Name is Eeooow, set in Kongthong village, East Khasi Hills, Meghalaya. The film was nominated for the 'Tangible Culture Prize' at the 15th RAI Film Festival at Watershed in Bristol (UK), in 2017. It shows the tradition of Jyngwrai Iawbei, in which children are given musical tunes as names. It features Khasi folk music and emphasizes the cultural heritage of the region.

His film won its second international award at the 23rd Film Festival della Lessinia, held in Bosco Chiesanuova, Italy, from 19 to 27 August 2017. It received the Prize from the Curatorium Cimbricum Veronense, in memory of Piero Piazzola and Mario Pigozzi, for the best film by a young director.

=== Theatre of the Earth ===
His film, Theatre of the Earth, won the Best Film: Cinema of Resistance award at the Signs Film Festival, held in Kochi, Kerala, from 26 to 30 September 2017.

== Recognition ==
Doren served as the chairperson of the Non-Feature Film Jury at the International Film Festival of India. He is recognized for his contributions to Indian cinema and his focus on documenting and preserving cultural traditions.

In November 2019, he was invited to the biennial Yamagata International Documentary Film Festival (YIDFF) for an in-depth discussion moderated by Tarun Bhartiya, a documentary filmmaker and co-founder of the Northeast India AV Archive at St. Anthony’s College, Shillong, Meghalaya.

== See also ==
- Meitei culture
- Oinam family
