= 32nd National Film Awards (India) =

Indian film awards

- 32nd National Film Awards
- Awarded for: Best of Indian cinema in 1984
- Awarded by: Directorate of Film Festivals
- Presented by: Giani Zail Singh (President of India)
- Presented on: June 1985
- Official website: dff.nic.in

Highlights
- Best Feature Film: Damul
- Best Non-Feature Film: Music of Satyajit Ray
- Best Book: Chalachitrer Abirbhab
- Best Film Critic: Swapan Mallik
- Dadasaheb Phalke Award: Satyajit Ray
- Most awards: Mukhamukham (4)

The 32nd National Film Awards, presented by Directorate of Film Festivals, the organisation set up by Ministry of Information and Broadcasting, India to felicitate the best of Indian Cinema released in the year 1984. Ceremony took place in June 1985.

With 32nd National Film Awards, three more categories from feature films are awarded with Swarna Kamal (Golden Lotus) along with Best Feature Film, namely Best Debut Film of a Director, Best Popular Film Providing Wholesome Entertainment and Best Children's Film.

Also couple of new categories were introduced with 32nd National Film Awards for Best Supporting Actor, Best Supporting Actress, Best Costume Design and Best Film on Other Social Issues and awarded with Rajat Kamal (Silver Lotus). As per the Constitution of India, Best Feature Film in each of the languages other than those specified in schedule VIII of the constitution are also awarded with Rajat Kamal.

For Non-feature films section, a new award was introduced for Best Non-Feature Film and awarded with Swarna Kamal, for both, film producer and director.

For Best Writing on Cinema section, a new award was introduced for Best Film Critic and awarded with Rajat Kamal.

== Awards ==
Awards were divided into feature films, non-feature films and books written on Indian cinema.

=== Lifetime Achievement Award ===
Name of Award	Image	Awardee(s)	Awarded As	Awards
Dadasaheb Phalke Award		Satyajit Ray	Film director	Swarna Kamal, ₹ 1.00,000 and a Shawl

=== Feature films ===
Feature films were awarded at All India as well as regional level. For 32nd National Film Awards, a Hindi film, Damul won the National Film Award for Best Feature Film whereas a Malayalam film, Mukhamukham won the maximum number of awards (four). Following were the awards given in each category:

==== Juries ====
A committee headed by Bhupen Hazarika was appointed to evaluate the feature films awards. Following were the jury members:

- Jury Members
  - Bhupen Hazarika (Chairperson) • Sharmila Tagore • T. V. Kunni Krishnan • Ajay Kumar Dey • Manmohan Talkh • Bharathiraja • Usha Bhagat • Girish Kasaravalli • Bhimsen • G. Hanumant Rao

==== All India Award ====
Following were the awards given:

===== Golden Lotus Award =====
Official name: Swarna Kamal

All the awardees are awarded with 'Golden Lotus Award (Swarna Kamal)', a certificate and cash prize.

Name of Award	Name of Film	Language	Awardee(s)	Cash prize
Best Feature Film	Damul	Hindi	Producer: Prakash Jha director: Prakash Jha	₹ 50,000 ₹ 25,000
Best Debut Film of a Director	Meendum Oru Kaathal Kathai	Tamil	Producer: Radhika Pothan; Director: Prathap K. Pothan	₹ 25,000 Each
Best Feature Film with Mass Appeal, Wholesome Entertainment and Aesthetic Value	Koni	Bengali	Producer: Government of West Bengal	₹ 50,000
Best Feature Film with Mass Appeal, Wholesome Entertainment and Aesthetic Value	Koni	Bengali	Director: Saroj Dey	₹ 25,000
Best Children's Film	My Dear Kuttichathan	Malayalam	Producer: M. C. Punnoose	₹ 30,000
Best Children's Film	My Dear Kuttichathan	Malayalam	Director: Jijo Punnoose	₹ 15,000

===== Silver Lotus Award =====
Official name: Rajat Kamal

All the awardees are awarded with 'Golden Lotus Award (Swarna Kamal)', a certificate and cash prize.

Name of Award	Name of Film	Language	Awardee(s)	Cash prize
Best Feature Film on National Integration	Aadmi Aur Aurat	Hindi	Producer: Doordarshan	₹ 30,000
Best Feature Film on National Integration	Aadmi Aur Aurat	Hindi	Director: Tapan Sinha	₹ 15,000
Best Film on Family Welfare	Mohan Joshi Hazir Ho!	Hindi	Producer: Saeed Akhtar Mirza; Director: Saeed Akhtar Mirza	₹ 30,000 ₹ 15,000
Best Film on Other Social Issues	Accident	Kannada	Producer: Sanket	₹ 30,000
Best Film on Other Social Issues	Accident	Kannada	Director: Shankar Nag	₹ 15,000
Best Direction	Mukhamukham	Malayalam	Adoor Gopalakrishnan	₹ 20,000
Best Cinematography	Holi	Hindi	Jehangir Choudhary	₹ 15,000
Best Screenplay	Mukhamukham	Malayalam	Adoor Gopalakrishnan	₹ 10,000
Best Actor	Paar	Hindi	Naseeruddin Shah	₹ 10,000
Best Actress	Paar	Hindi	Shabana Azmi	₹ 10,000
Best Supporting Actor	Ghare Baire	Bengali	Victor Banerjee	₹ 10,000
Best Supporting Actress	Party	Hindi	Rohini Hattangadi	₹ 10,000
Best Child Artist	My Dear Kuttichathan	Malayalam	• Master Arvind • Master Suresh • Master Mukesh • Baby Sonia	₹ 5,000/-
Best Audiography	Mukhamukham	Malayalam	P. Devdas	₹ 10,000
Best Editing	Sitaara	Telugu	Anil Malnad	₹ 10,000
Best Art Direction	Utsav	Hindi	• Nachiket Patwardhan • Jayoo Patwardhan	₹ 10,000
Best Lyrics	Saaransh	Hindi	Vasant Dev	₹ 10,000
Best Music Direction	Ankahee	Hindi	Jaidev	₹ 10,000
Best Male Playback Singer	Ankahee	Hindi	Bhimsen Joshi	₹ 10,000
Best Female Playback Singer	Sitaara	Telugu	S. Janaki	₹ 10,000
Best Costume Design	Ghare Baire	Bengali	• Harudas • Bapuldas	₹ 10,000
Special Jury Award	Giddh	Hindi	T. S. Ranga	₹ 5,000

==== Regional Awards ====
The award is given to best film in the regional languages in India.

Name of Award	Name of Film	Awardee(s)	Cash prize
Best Feature Film in Assamese	Son Maina	Producer: R. B. Mehta, M. P. N. Nair and Shiv Prasad Thakur	₹ 20,000
Best Feature Film in Assamese	Son Maina	Director: Shiv Prasad Thakur	₹ 10,000
Best Feature Film in Bengali	Ghare Baire	Producer: NFDC	₹ 20,000
Best Feature Film in Bengali	Ghare Baire	Director: Satyajit Ray	₹ 10,000
Best Feature Film in Hindi	Paar	Producer: Swapan Sarkar	₹ 20,000
Best Feature Film in Hindi	Paar	Director: Gautam Ghose	₹ 10,000
Best Feature Film in Kannada	Bandhana	Producer: Rohini Pictures	₹ 20,000
Best Feature Film in Kannada	Bandhana	Director: R. B. Rajendra Singh	₹ 10,000
Best Feature Film in Malayalam	Mukhamukham	Producer: K. Ravindran Nair	₹ 20,000
Best Feature Film in Malayalam	Mukhamukham	Director: Adoor Gopalakrishnan	₹ 10,000
Best Feature Film in Marathi	Mahananda	Producer: Mahesh Satoskar	₹ 20,000
Best Feature Film in Marathi	Mahananda	Director: K. G. Koregaonkar	₹ 10,000
Best Feature Film in Oriya	Klanta Aparahna	Producer: Dynamic Studio	₹ 20,000
Best Feature Film in Oriya	Klanta Aparahna	Director: Manmohan Mahapatra	₹ 10,000
Best Feature Film in Tamil	Achamillai Achamillai	Producer: Rajam Balachander and V. Natarajan	₹ 20,000
Best Feature Film in Tamil	Achamillai Achamillai	Director: K. Balachander	₹ 10,000
Best Feature Film in Telugu	Sitaara	Producer: Edida Nageshwara Rao	₹ 20,000
Best Feature Film in Telugu	Sitaara	Director: Vamsy	₹ 10,000

Best Feature Film in Each of the Language Other Than Those Specified in the Schedule VIII of the Constitution

Name of Award	Name of Film	Awardee(s)	Cash prize
Best Feature Film in Khasi	Manik Raitong	Producer: Rishan Rapsang	₹ 20,000
Best Feature Film in Khasi	Manik Raitong	Director: Ardhendu Bhattacharya	₹ 10,000

=== Non-Feature films ===
Short Films made in any Indian language and certified by the Central Board of Film Certification as a documentary/newsreel/fiction are eligible for non-feature film section.

==== Juries ====
A committee headed by V. K. Murthy was appointed to evaluate the non-feature films awards. Following were the jury members:

- Jury Members
  - V. K. Murthy (Chairperson) • Shanta Sabarjeet Singh • Ashish Mukherjee • J. P. Das

==== Golden Lotus Award ====
Official name: Swarna Kamal

Name of Award	Name of Film	Language	Awardee(s)	Cash prize
Best Non-Feature Film	Music of Satyajit Ray	English	Producer: NFDC; Director: Utpalendu Chakrabarty	₹ 5,000/- Each

==== Silver Lotus Award ====
Official name: Rajat Kamal

All the awardees are awarded with 'Silver Lotus Award (Rajat Kamal)' and cash prize.

Name of Award	Name of Film	Language	Awardee(s)	Cash prize
Best Anthropological / Ethnographic Film	Bada Media	Hindi	Producer: Director: Manohar S. Varpe	₹ 10,000/- Each
Best Biographical Film	Padmashri Kalamandalam Krishnan Nair	Malayalam	Producer: James Paul; Director: Matthew Paul	₹ 10,000/- Each
Best Scientific Film (including Environment and Ecology)	Aranya Aamar	Bengali	Producer: West Bengal Ministry of Forest; Director: Tarun Majumdar	₹ 10,000/- Each
Best Agriculture Film and Best Industrial Film (Jointly given)	Krishi Jantrapati	Hindi	Producer and Director: Ghanashyam Mahapatra	₹ 10,000/- Each
Best Historical Reconstruction / Compilation Film	Nehru	English	Producer: Yash Chowdhary; Director: Shyam Benegal and Yuri Aldokhin	₹ 10,000/- Each
Best Film on Family Welfare	Sweekar	Hindi	Producer: Bal Mehta; Director: Vishram Revankar	₹ 10,000/- Each
Best Film on Family Welfare	Geeli Meetti	Hindi	Producer: Women and Social Welfare Ministry; Director: Sanjay Kak	₹ 10,000/- Each
Best Exploration / Adventure Film	Everest 84	English	Producer: Cinema Vision India; Director: Siddharth Kak	₹ 10,000/- Each
Best News Film	The Rickshaw Drivers of Madhya Pradesh	English	Producer: Madhya Pradesh Media; Director: Naren Kondra	₹ 10,000/- Each
Best Animation Film	National Highway	English	Producer: National Institute of Design director and Animator: R. N. Mistry	₹ 10,000/- Each
Special Jury Award	Shri Hemkunt Saahib			₹ 5,000/-

=== Best Writing on Cinema ===
The awards aim at encouraging study and appreciation of cinema as an art form and dissemination of information and critical appreciation of this art-form through publication of books, articles, reviews etc.

==== Juries ====
A committee headed by Vikram Singh was appointed to judge the writing on Indian cinema. Following were the jury members:

- Jury Members
  - Vikram Singh (Chairperson) • Muhammad Shameem • Jagmohan

==== Silver Lotus Award ====
Official name: Rajat Kamal

All the awardees are awarded with 'Silver Lotus Award (Rajat Kamal)' and cash prize.

Name of Award	Name of Book	Language	Awardee(s)	Cash prize
Best Book on Cinema	Chalachitrer Abirbhab	Bengali	Author: Jagannath Chathopadhyay	₹5,000
Best Film Critic			Swapan Mallick	₹5,000
