= Joshy Joseph =

Indian documentary filmmaker and film critic

- Born: 29 April 1962 (age 64); Kochi
- Occupations: documentary filmmaker, film critic
- Years active: 1980s-present
- Spouse: Bency (wife)
- Children: son

Joshy Joseph is an Indian documentary filmmaker and film critic who has been active since the 1980s. He has won seven national film awards, including one for best film critic. Based in Kolkata, Joseph heads the Films Division, Eastern Region, where he oversees documentary film production and related activities.

Some of Joseph's notable works focus on the cultural, linguistic, ethnic, and political issues of India's northeastern states, apart from Bengal and Odisha. These include And the Bamboo Blooms (1999), Wearing the Face (2000), One Day from a Hangman's Life (2005), Journeying with Mahasweta Devi (2009), With Quietude to Nirad (2015), and Laparoscopic Cinemascapes (2022).

Joseph has made multiple documentaries on the late Bengali writer and activist Mahasweta Devi, based on his association with her from around 2004 until her death in 2016. These include Journeying with Mahasweta Devi (2009) and Mahasweta Devi – Close Up (2010).

== Early life and career ==
Hailing from Kadamakkudy, an island cluster about 15 km from Kochi, Joshy Joseph attended the city's St. Albert's College and Union Christian College, Aluva. He was an avid filmgoer during his college days. He aspired to join the Film and Television Institute of India (FTII) but did not clear the interview stage. However, he remained hopeful, and soon his writing skills earned him a position as a language translator at the Films Division in the 1980s. This job took him to Mumbai.

While working as a translator at the Films Division, Joseph also developed film scripts, some of which were initially rejected.

Around 1996, he moved to Kolkata on promotion. While in Kolkata, he began to bring more commitment and focus to the craft of documentary filmmaking.

Streamlining Public Sector (1991) was one of his earliest documentaries for Films Division. Since then, he has directed more than 30 documentaries and experimental films, in addition to two feature films. He also worked as an assistant director on Adoor Gopalakrishnan's Kathapurushan (1995).

Besides working with the Films Division, Joseph has directed films for independent producers, such as Drik India, a photographic NGO. Notably, he produced the documentary One Day from a Hangman's Life (2005), which was backed by Drik India. He has also self-produced films, once using money his father had given him for the purchase of a new house.

Though essentially a filmmaker, Joseph also provides thoughtful analyses and discussions on the medium of cinema as a film critic. His contributions in this field have earned him the National Film Award for Best Film Critic. He is the author of books in Malayalam, including Kolkata Cocktail (2010) and Mahasweta Deviyodoppam - transl.: With Mahasweta Devi - (2012)

== Awards and nominations ==
- Sarang: Symphony in Cacophony (1997) - National Film Award for Best Promotional Film
- N. M. No. 367 – Sentence of Silence (1998) - National Film Award for Best Non-Feature Film on Family Welfare
- Status Quo (1999) - ASS- ASS - I- NATION - Selected for screening at the International Film Festival of India (IFFI) 2000
- Wearing the Face (2000) - National Film Award for Best Investigative Film
- A Poet, A City & A Footballer (2014) - National Film Award - Special Jury Award (Non-Feature Film)
- And The Bamboo Blooms (1999) - National Film Award for Best Non-Feature Environment/Conservation/Preservation Film
- National Film Award for Best Film Critic (2010)

== Filmography ==
As director - documentaries

- Streamlining Public Sector (1991)
- Sarang: Symphony in Cacophony (1998)
- Sentence of Silence (1999)
- Status Quo (1999) - ASS- ASS - I- NATION
- Wearing the Face (2000)
- One Day from a Hangman's Life (2005)
- Walking Dead (2007)
- Making the Face (2007) – with Suvendu Chatterjee
- Journeying with Mahasweta Devi (2009)
- Mahasweta Devi: Close Up (2010)
- Barag and Babu Bilous
- Center for Silence
- Waiting the Face
- Song of Marbles (2015) - Curated by Joshy Joseph
- Untitled (2015) - Curated by Joshy Joseph
- A Misty Voyage (2015) - Curated by Joshy Joseph
- Anungla (2015) - Curated by Joshy Joseph
- A Poet, a City and a Footballer (2015)
- With Quietude to Nirad (2015)
- Trees of Tongues in Tripura (2016)
- Echo from the Pukpui Skies (2020)

As director - experimental films

- Mobile (2001)
- Old Man and the Swan(2015)
- Serendipity Cinema (2016)
- Manipur Mindscapes (2021)
- Laparoscopic Cinemascapes (2022)
- Mizo Soundscapes(2020)
- Bonafide Bonfires
- Interpretations
- Masterstroke

As cinematographer - documentary

- Echo from the Pukpui Skies (2020)

As director/writer - feature film

- Imaginary Line (2002)
- Walking Over Water (2020)

As assistant director – feature film

- Kathapurushan - The Man of the Story - (1995)

Books

- Kolkata Cocktail (2010) by Joshy Joseph, Mathrubhumi Books.
- Mahasweta Deviyodoppam (2012) — Translator: VM Girija. Malayalam translation of Joshy Joseph's screenplay Journeying with Mahasweta Devi, Mathrubhumi Books.
- Calcutta Films: A Joshy Joseph Trilogy (2022) by Vidyarthy Chatterjee, Cerebrum Books — Winner of the Chidananda Dasgupta Memorial Award for Best Writing on Cinema.

== Community engagement and dialogue ==
Joshy was the artistic director of the first edition of the Kadamakudy International Film Festival (KAIFF) held in August 2024. The festival was organized by the Kadamakudy Government Vocational Higher Secondary School, the Kerala State Chalachitra Academy, and the Kadamakudy Grama panchayat. KAIFF aims to introduce the local community in the suburban village of Kadamakudy to alternative cinema while promoting village tourism.

== Public stance and activism ==
Joseph was one of 46 writers, filmmakers, artists, and public figures who issued a statement in April 2024 condemning certain Christian churches for screening the propaganda film The Kerala Story.

In August 2024, Joseph affirmed his support for Bengali actor Sreelekha Mitra's allegations of misconduct against a Malayalam film director.

== Personal ==
Joseph's family includes his wife Bency and son.
