= Kanhaiya Lal Nandan =

Indian poet

- Born: 1 July 1933; Parsadepur, Fatehpur district, Uttar Pradesh, India
- Died: 25 September 2010 (aged 77); New Delhi, India
- Resting place: Lodi Road crematorium, New Delhi; 28°35′21″N 77°14′27″E
- Occupations: Poet; Lyricist
- Known for: Hindi literature
- Awards: Padma Shri; Bhartendu Award

Kanhaiya Lal Nandan (1933–2010) was an Indian poet, lyricist and a former Features Editor of the Navbharat Times. He also edited the Hindi magazines Parag, Sarika and Dinman.

== Life ==
Born on 1 July 1933 in Parsadepur in Fatehpur district, Uttar Pradesh, Nandan graduated from the Allahabad University and continued his studies to secure a master's degree and a doctoral degree from Bhavnagar University.

His career started as an academic at Mumbai University, but, after four years he turned to journalism by joining Dharmayug as an assistant editor in 1961 and stayed there until 1972. Later, he moved to Parag as its editor, before working as the editor of Sarika and Dinman.

Nandan authored over 36 books, including Ghat Ghat Ka Pani, Aag Ke Rang and Guzra Kaha Kaha Se. In 1999, he Government of India awarded him the fourth highest civilian award of the Padma Shri. He also received the Bhartendu Award. He died on 25 September 2010, at the age of 77, at a hospital in New Delhi, survived by his wife and two daughters. He was cremated at Lodi Road crematorium in the city.

== See also ==
- Navbharat Times
