= 58th National Film Awards =

2011 Indian film award

- 58th National Film Awards
- Awarded for: Best of Indian cinema in 2010
- Awarded by: Directorate of Film Festivals
- Presented by: Pratibha Patil (President of India)
- Announced on: 19 May 2011
- Presented on: 9 September 2011
- Site: Vigyan Bhavan, New Delhi
- Hosted by: Mahi Gill and Rajat Kapoor
- Official website: dff.nic.in

Highlights
- Best Feature Film: Adaminte Makan Abu
- Best Non-Feature Film: Germ
- Best Book: From Rajahs and Yogis to Gandhi and Beyond
- Best Film Critic: • N. Manu Chakravarthy • Joshy Joseph
- Dadasaheb Phalke Award: K. Balachander
- Most awards: Aadukalam (6)

The 58th National Film Awards, presented by Directorate of Film Festivals, the organisation set up by Ministry of Information and Broadcasting, India to felicitate the best of Indian Cinema for the year 2010.

The selection process started by announcing the invitation for the awards on 18 March 2011. For feature and non-feature films, all the films certified by Central Board of Film Certification, India between 1 January 2010 and 31 December 2010 were made eligible whereas for the best writing on cinema, all the books and articles as well reviews on Indian cinema published between 1 January 2010 and 31 December 2010 were made eligible for the awards.

Three different committees were instituted in order to judge the various entries for feature film, non-feature film and best writing on cinema sections; headed by J. P. Dutta, for feature films and A. K. Bir along with Ashok Vajpeyi for non-feature films and best writing on cinema sections, respectively. Another committee of five members was also constituted for the Dadasaheb Phalke Award, having included two past Dadasaheb Phalke Award recipient, Shyam Benegal and Adoor Gopalakrishnan.

Each chairperson for feature film, non-feature film and best writing on cinema sections announced the award on 19 May 2011 for their respective sections and award ceremony took place at Vigyan Bhavan, New Delhi with President of India, Pratibha Patil giving away the awards on 9 September 2011.

== Awards ==
Awards were divided into feature films, non-feature films and books written on Indian cinema.

=== Lifetime Achievement Award ===
The award is given to a prominent personality from the Indian film industry for their contribution.

==== Juries ====
A committee consisting five eminent personalities from Indian film industry was appointed to evaluate the lifetime achievement award, Dadasaheb Phalke Award. Following were the jury members:

- Jury Members

• Shyam Benegal
• Adoor Gopalakrishnan
• Prasoon Joshi
• Shaji N. Karun
• Raghu Rai

Name of Award	Image	Awardee(s)	Awarded As	Awards
Dadasaheb Phalke Award		K. Balachander	Director and Producer	Swarna Kamal, ₹ 1,000,000 and a Shawl

=== Feature films ===
Films made in any Indian language shot on 16 mm, 35 mm or in a wider gauge or digital format but released on a film format or video/digital but certified by the Central Board of Film Certification as a feature film or featurette are eligible for Feature Film section.

Feature films were awarded at All India as well as regional level. For 58th National Film Awards, a Malayalam film, Adaminte Makan Abu won the National Film Award for Best Feature Film; whereas a Tamil film, Aadukalam won the maximum number of awards (6). Following were the awards given in each category:

==== Juries ====
A committee headed by J. P. Dutta was appointed to evaluate the feature films awards. The selection process returned to a Two Tier System of Selection. The Chairperson for the Northern Region was Nirad N. Mohapatra, for the Western Region, Chandraprakash Dwivedi, for South–I Region, Arunoday Sharma, for the Eastern Region, J. F. C. Durai and for South- II Region, Ansu Ranjan Sur. Following were the jury members:

- Jury Members
  - J. P. Dutta (Chairperson) • Ansu Ranjan Sur • Arunoday Sharma • Bharat Bala • Chandraprakash Dwivedi
  - G. S. Bhaskar • J. F. C. Durai • K. N. T. Sastry • Keval Arora • Nirad N. Mohapatra • Prahlad Kakkar
- Jury Regional : East
  - J. F. C. Durai • Nirmal Dhar • T. Krishnan Unni • Pranab Das • Suman Haripriya
- Jury Regional : West
  - Chandraprakash Dwivedi • Sukumar Jatania • Aijaz Khan • Rajiv Vijayakar • Purushottam Berde
- Jury Regional : North
  - Nirad N. Mohapatra • Chitraarth • M. M. Alex • Jeetendra Suman • Manjul Sinha
- Jury Regional : South-I
  - Arunoday Sharma • K. S. Gomatam • Gnana Rajasekaran • K. G. George • Akkineni Kutumba Rao
- Jury Regional : South-II
  - Ansu Ranjan Sur • B. S. Lingadevaru • D. V. Narasa Raju • N. Manu Chakravarthy • Meenakshi Shedde

==== All India Award ====
Following were the awards given:

===== Golden Lotus Award =====
Official name: Swarna Kamal

All the awardees are awarded with 'Golden Lotus Award (Swarna Kamal)', a certificate and cash prize.

Name of Award	Name of Film	Language	Awardee(s)	Cash prize
Best Feature Film	Adaminte Makan Abu	Malayalam	Producer: Salim Ahamed and Ashraf Bedi director: Salim Ahamed	₹ 2,50,000/- Each
Best Feature Film	Citation: For a simple yet evocative articulation of humanist values that liberates matters of faith from the constrictions of narrow parochialism. The concerns of Abu, son of Adam, are timeless and universal in their scope and appeal.			
Best Debut Film of a Director	Baboo Band Baaja	Marathi	Producer: Nita Jadhav; Director: Rajesh Pinjani	₹ 1,25,000/- Each
Best Debut Film of a Director	Citation: For narrating a riveting tale of a father reluctant to educate his son, a mother who fiercely believes in its liberatory value of education, and the son who is caught in the crossfire. ‘Baboo’ is an outstanding debut project by director.			
Best Popular Film Providing Wholesome Entertainment	Dabangg	Hindi	Producer: Arbaaz Khan, Malaika Arora Khan and Dhillin Mehta; Director: Abhinav Singh Kashyap	₹ 2,00,000/- Each
Best Popular Film Providing Wholesome Entertainment	Citation: For responding to the need of cinegoers for "mast" entertainment that is rooted in Indian soil.			
Best Children's Film	Hejjegalu	Kannada	Producer: Basanta Kumar Patil; Director: P. R. Ramadas Naidu	₹ 1,50,000/- Each
Best Children's Film	Citation: For the tale of a little girl who cheerfully takes on her little shoulders the challenge of preserving the fabric of her family.			
Best Direction	Aadukalam	Tamil	Vetrimaaran	₹ 2,50,000/-
Best Direction	Citation: For narrating with panache and a realistic cinematic grammar, a gritty tale of love, jealousy and betrayal in the midst of blood-sport and violence.			

===== Silver Lotus Award =====
Official name: Rajat Kamal

All the awardees are awarded with 'Silver Lotus Award (Rajat Kamal)', a certificate and cash prize.

Name of Award	Name of Film	Language	Awardee(s)	Cash prize
Best Feature Film on National Integration	Moner Manush	Bengali	Producer: Gautam Kundu; Director: Gautam Ghose	₹ 1,50,000/- Each
Best Feature Film on National Integration	Citation: For celebrating the union of the human spirit with the divine, and realizing the inner, mystical dimension through the life and song of one of the foremost mystic minstrels from Bengal, a Sufi poet in the Baul tradition.			
Best Film on Other Social Issues	Champions	Marathi	Producer: Aishwarya Narkar; Director: Ramesh More	₹ 1,50,000/- Each
Best Film on Other Social Issues	Citation: For a soul-stirring saga of two young brothers located in a world of deprivation, forced to fend each other and their mother even as their thirst for education surpasses the pangs of hunger.			
Best Film on Environment / Conservation / Preservation	Bettada Jeeva	Kannada	Producer: Basanta Kumar Patil; Director: P. Sheshadri	₹ 1,50,000/- Each
Best Film on Environment / Conservation / Preservation	Citation: For the charming narrative of an old couple as they bravely harness the wilderness to nurture their young plantation, and yearn for the return of their only son.			
Best Actor	Citation for the award: Two riveting performances that fuse character and actor in one.			
Best Actor	Aadukalam	Tamil	Dhanush	₹ 50,000/- Each
Best Actor	Citation: For the nuanced portrayal of a raw, cocky young man who learns his lessons in life the hard way.			₹ 50,000/- Each
Best Actor	Adaminte Makan Abu	Malayalam	Salim Kumar	₹ 50,000/- Each
Best Actor	Citation: For an evocative, restrained performance as a simple man with an unshakeable humanist faith in his quest for salvation.			₹ 50,000/- Each
Best Actress	Citation for the award: For the portrayal of two mothers struggling to better the lives of their children in the face of untold hardship.			
Best Actress	Baboo Band Baaja	Marathi	Mitalee Jagtap Varadkar	₹ 50,000/- Each
Best Actress	Citation: For portraying with finesse a mother who strives to achieve for her son a better future than the one denied to her by circumstances.			₹ 50,000/- Each
Best Actress	Thenmerku Paruvakaatru	Tamil	Saranya Ponvannan	₹ 50,000/- Each
Best Actress	Citation: For playing a fiercely combative single mother who shields her son to the point of sacrificing herself for the sake of his happiness.			₹ 50,000/- Each
Best Supporting Actor	Mynaa	Tamil	Thambi Ramaiah	₹ 50,000/-
Best Supporting Actor	Citation: For a heart-warming performance as a policeman who discovers the finer side of his own humanity in the process of capturing a fugitive.			
Best Supporting Actress	Namma Gramam	Tamil	Sukumari	₹ 50,000/-
Best Supporting Actress	Citation: For the sensitive portrayal of an aged widow who challenges orthodoxy when crippling ritualistic restrictions are imposed upon her widowed teenaged granddaughter.			
Best Child Artist	Citation for the award: Four actors express with charm and heartbreak, the world of the child.			
Best Child Artist	I Am Kalam	Hindi	Harsh Mayar	₹ 50,000/- Each
Best Child Artist	Citation: For performing with shining eyes and an urchin smile, the razor sharp spirit of a survivor who dreams of excellence.			₹ 50,000/- Each
Best Child Artist	Champions	Marathi	• Shantanu Ranganekar • Machindra Gadkar	₹ 50,000/- Each
Best Child Artist	Citation: For their realistic portrayal of two gutsy brothers bonded by blood and responsibility, battling for survival in the underbelly of a heartless city.			₹ 50,000/- Each
Best Child Artist	Baboo Band Baaja	Marathi	Vivek Chabukswar	₹ 50,000/- Each
Best Child Artist	Citation: For capturing the indomitable spirit of a young village boy who is hungry to learn in an environment that tries to close all doors on him.			₹ 50,000/- Each
Best Male Playback Singer	Mee Sindhutai Sapkal ("Hey Bhaskara Kshitijavari Ya")	Marathi	Suresh Wadkar	₹ 50,000/-
Best Male Playback Singer	Citation: For rendering with resonant emotion a soulful lyric, with a purity of musical expression and spiritual empathy.			
Best Female Playback Singer	Ishqiya ("Badi Dheere Jali")	Hindi	Rekha Bhardwaj	₹ 50,000/-
Best Female Playback Singer	Citation: For a sensual and feeling rendering of lyrics that evoke a maiden's pining for the beloved.			
Best Cinematography	Adaminte Makan Abu	Malayalam	Cameraman: Madhu Ambat	₹ 50,000/-
Best Cinematography	Citation: For the visual poetry that augments and reinforces the concern of the narrative and for unfolding the infinite vistas of nascent digital technology in the visual medium.			
Best Screenplay • Screenplay Writer (Original)	Aadukalam	Tamil	Vetrimaaran	₹ 50,000/-
Best Screenplay • Screenplay Writer (Original)	Citation: For its kaleidoscopic blending of realism, tradition and contemporaneity, soaked in local flavour on an infinite canvas.			
Best Screenplay • Screenplay Writer (Adapted)	Mee Sindhutai Sapkal	Marathi	• Anant Mahadevan • Sanjay Pawar	₹ 25,000/- Each
Best Screenplay • Screenplay Writer (Adapted)	Citation: For retaining the concerns and values of a biographical account even while translating it into the cinematic medium and honouring the essence of the original.			
Best Screenplay • Dialogues	Mee Sindhutai Sapkal	Marathi	Sanjay Pawar	₹ 50,000/-
Best Screenplay • Dialogues	Citation: For crisply bringing to life the textures of various characters through articulating their emotion and thought process.			
Best Audiography • Location Sound Recordist	Ishqiya	Hindi	Kaamod Kharade	₹ 50,000/-
Best Audiography • Location Sound Recordist	Citation: For capturing the soft nuances of the artists' expressions and the multitudinous variations of the location ambience in a sensorial manner.			
Best Audiography • Sound designer	Chitrasutram	Malayalam	Subhadeep Sengupta	₹ 50,000/-
Best Audiography • Sound designer	Citation: For imaprting a subliminal experience to the viewer through a sound design that weaves a rich tapestry of auditory perception as it rides in tandem with the visual abstraction in this cinematic creation.			
Best Audiography • Re-recordist of the Final Mixed Track	Ishqiya	Hindi	Debajit Changmai	₹ 50,000/-
Best Audiography • Re-recordist of the Final Mixed Track	Citation: For integrating the various components of sound design effectively so as to deliver a near-tactile experience that is at once real and artistic.			
Best Editing	Aadukalam	Tamil	Kishore Te.	₹ 50,000/-
Best Editing	Citation: For the subliminal impact created by the use of montage so as to bring to the fore the thematic concerns of the narrative in a holistic manner.			
Best Art Direction	Enthiran	Tamil	Sabu Cyril	₹ 50,000/-
Best Art Direction	Citation: For the style and finesse realised in the creation of a set design that is coherent with the futuristic visual style of the narrative.			
Best Costume Design	Namma Gramam	Tamil	Indrans Jayan	₹ 50,000/-
Best Costume Design	Citation: For realising effectively the texture of a period in the history of modern India through minuscule attention to detailing.			
Best Make-up Artist	Moner Manush	Bengali	Vikram Gaikwad	₹ 50,000/-
Best Make-up Artist	Citation: For the admirable detailing and remarkable consistency achieved in the etching of the characters who traverse an extensive time span.			
Best Music Direction • Songs	Ishqiya	Hindi	Vishal Bhardwaj	₹ 50,000/-
Best Music Direction • Songs	Citation: For the creative blend of rustic flavour and the Indian traditional music.			
Best Music Direction • Background Score	Adaminte Makan Abu	Malayalam	Isaac Thomas Kottukapally	₹ 50,000/-
Best Music Direction • Background Score	Citation: For minimalistic use of appropriate background score that nurtures the essence of the narrative.			
Best Lyrics	Thenmerku Paruvakaatru ("Kallikkaattil Perandha Thaayae")	Tamil	Vairamuthu	₹ 50,000/-
Best Lyrics	Citation: For giving a meaningful expression to the narrative through contextual amplification of emotion.			
Best Special Effects	Enthiran	Tamil	V. Srinivas Mohan	₹ 50,000/-
Best Special Effects	Citation: For bringing of age a spectrum of visual special effects in Indian cinema and thereby carving out a niche segment for the practitioners of this art form on the global map.			
Best Choreography	Aadukalam	Tamil	Dinesh	₹ 50,000/-
Best Choreography	Citation: For the native charm and innovative design in the art of choreography that creates an effervescent energy in the spectator.			
Special Jury Award	Mee Sindhutai Sapkal	Marathi	• Bindiya Khanolkar and Sachin Khanolkar (Producer) • Anant Mahadevan (Director)	₹ 2,00,000/-
Special Jury Award	Citation: For a powerful cinematic rendition of the epic journey of a living person, an abandoned woman who refused to become a victim of circumstance and who, in the process of realising her inner potential, transformed her life as well as but also the lives of innumerable others.			
Special Mention	Bettada Jeeva	Kannada	K. Shivaram Karanth (Writer) (Posthumously)	Certificate Only
Special Mention	Citation: Breaking fresh ground in recognising the creative fountain-head-the creator of the story- the jury pays tribute to a literary giant and author of novella Bettada Jeeva, the late Shivaram Karanth. The jury also salutes his invaluable association with the world of Indian Cinema as an ingenious practitioner of the art form.			Certificate Only
Special Mention	Aadukalam	Tamil	V. I. S. Jayabalan (Actor)	Certificate Only
Special Mention	Citation: For his portrayal of the patriarch of a cock-fighting clan who‌, with a face seemingly carved in teak and leather, watches helplessly the disintegration of his power and authority.			Certificate Only

==== Regional Awards ====
The award is given to best film in the regional languages in India.

Name of Award	Name of Film	Awardee(s)	Cash prize
Best Feature Film in Assamese	Jetuka Pator Dore	Producer: Md. Noorul Sultan; Director: Jadumoni Dutta	₹ 1,00,000/- Each
Best Feature Film in Assamese	Citation: For a heart-warming portrayal of the rural landscape with an emphasis on the need for self-reliance in the process of development.		
Best Feature Film in Bengali	Ami Aadu	Producer: New Theatres Pvt. Ltd; Director: Somnath Gupta	₹ 1,00,000/- Each
Best Feature Film in Bengali	Citation: For the subtle portrayal of an endearing love story in the time of cultural conflicts. It is a sincere attempt to present the personal tragedy of the emigrant commoner caught in the crossfire of international wars.		
Best Feature Film in Hindi	Do Dooni Chaar	Producer: Arindam Chaudhuri; Director: Habib Faisal	₹ 1,00,000/- Each
Best Feature Film in Hindi	Citation: For an entertaining narrative that brings to the fore the struggle of a school teacher who is torn between maintaining his integrity and the lure of a little more comfort.		
Best Feature Film in Kannada	Puttakkana Highway	Producer: Shylaja Nag and Prakash Raj; Director: B. Suresha	₹ 1,00,000/- Each
Best Feature Film in Kannada	Citation: For a persuasive articulation of a topical social issue where in the name of development, land is appropriated and people are displaced as a consequence.		
Best Feature Film in Malayalam	Veettilekkulla Vazhi	Producer: B. C. Joshi; Director: Dr. Biju	₹ 1,00,000/- Each
Best Feature Film in Malayalam	Citation: For a spiritually uplifting narrative in which a doctor journeys through unfamiliar landscapes to fulfill his promise to a dying mother and in the process overcomes personal grief to find his salvation as a man of virtue.		
Best Feature Film in Marathi	Mala Aai Vhhaychy!	Producer: Samruddhi Porey; Director: Samruddhi Porey	₹ 1,00,000/- Each
Best Feature Film in Marathi	Citation: For an emotional presentation of the story of a surrogate mother who is torn between love and sacrifice for the child and the need to sacrifice that bond of his well-being.		
Best Feature Film in Tamil	Thenmerku Paruvakaatru	Producer: Shibu Isaac; Director: Seenu Ramasamy	₹ 1,00,000/- Each
Best Feature Film in Tamil	Citation: For an emotive articulation of the combative spirit of a mother for whom her son’s happiness is paramount.		

Best Feature Film in Each of the Language Other Than Those Specified in the Schedule VIII of the Constitution

Name of Award	Name of Film	Awardee(s)	Cash prize
Best Feature Film in English	Memories in March	Producer: Shrikant Mohta; Director: Sanjoy Nag	₹ 1,00,000/- Each
Best Feature Film in English	Citation: For the effective exploration of a bereaved mother’s coming to terms with the fact of her son’s sexual identity.		

=== Non-Feature Films ===
Short Films made in any Indian language and certified by the Central Board of Film Certification as a documentary/newsreel/fiction are eligible for non-feature film section.

==== Juries ====
A committee headed by A. K. Bir was appointed to evaluate the non-feature films awards. Following were the jury members:

- Jury Members
  - A. K. Bir (Chairperson) • Amlan Datta • Gautam Benegal • Kavita Joshi • Oken Amakcham • Rajula Shah • Sourav Sarangi

==== Golden Lotus Award ====
Official name: Swarna Kamal

All the awardees are awarded with 'Golden Lotus Award (Swarna Kamal)', a certificate and cash prize.

Name of Award	Name of Film	Language	Awardee(s)	Cash prize
Best Non-Feature Film	Germ	Hindi	Producer: Satyajit Ray Film and Television Institute; Director: Snehal R. Nair	₹ 1,50,000/- Each
Best Non-Feature Film	Citation: Through abstract visualisation and endearing black and white tones, the film depicts the human existence, afflicted by cancer, in a very sublime and somber tone. Along with the perception and growth, from child to youth and by the curious collection of thrown passport photographs, the film maker presents the changing perspective of the vision of the modern growing world in a very engaging manner.			
Best Non-Feature Film Direction	Shyam Raat Seher	Hindi	Arunima Sharma	₹ 1,50,000/-
Best Non-Feature Film Direction	Citation: For intelligent articulation of a shared urban angst in a powerful cinematic style and well constructed mise-en-scene. The maturity of the director is reflected in the balanced approach to all the elements that blend to create an impression in the viewers mind.			

==== Silver Lotus Award ====
Official name: Rajat Kamal

All the awardees are awarded with 'Silver Lotus Award (Rajat Kamal)' and cash prize.

Name of Award	Name of Film	Language	Awardee(s)	Cash prize
Best First Non-Feature Film	Pistulya	Marathi and Telugu	Producer: Nagraj Manjule; Director: Nagraj Manjule	₹ 75,000/- Each
Best First Non-Feature Film	Citation: For a delightful exposition of the poignant life of a poverty-stricken child, who nurtures a dream of embracing the source of learning through education, with simplicity and fluency. The director portrays the spirit of adventure of the child, through fine performances.			
Best Anthropological / Ethnographic Film	Songs of Mashangva	Tangkhul, Manipuri and English	Producer: Oinam Doren; Director: Oinam Doren	₹ 50,000/- Each
Best Anthropological / Ethnographic Film	Citation: For an insightful foray into the complex and layered life of a 'song' and all that it carries within it for a community. It inquires into the shared critical history of a community in the specific context of an overarching missionary presence and how it has affected their lives. The jury appreciates it for the courageous, yet poetic exploration of the subject from the ethnographic perspective.			
Best Biographical Film	Nilamadhaba	English	Producer: Films Division; Director: Dilip Patnaik	₹ 50,000/- Each
Best Biographical Film	Citation: For an intimate portrayal of the inimitable Sunanda Patnaik, whose life is inseparable from contemporary Indian classical music. The film explores the inner spirit of the artist through evocative moments, pregnant with visual passages.			
Best Arts / Cultural Film	Leaving Home	Hindi	Producer: Jaideep Varma; Director: Jaideep Varma	₹ 50,000/- Each
Best Arts / Cultural Film	Citation: For an emotive and enthralling exposition of the passion and dedication of a group, bound by the spirit of music, who transcend the commercial boundary to embrace their original creative flair. Without compromising, the group led to the adventure with courage and guts. The film maker has journeyed through this adventure with dramatic sensibility and compassion.			
Best Scientific Film	Heart to Heart	Manipuri and English	Producer: Rotary Club of Imphal; Director: Bachaspatimayum Sunzu	₹ 50,000/- Each
Best Scientific Film	Citation: For a very well constructed reality with an engaging dramatic sensibility, that depicts the grimness of natural health maladies. It guides the viewer through emotions and playful spirit of the child. With the help of medical science, it enlightens the viewer with awareness of Congenital Heart Defect and its promising treatment.			
Best Environment / Conservation / Preservation Film	Iron is Hot	English	Producer: Meghnath Bhattacharjee; Director: Biju Toppo and Meghnath Bhattacharjee	₹ 50,000/- Each
Best Environment / Conservation / Preservation Film	Citation: For the film which is well documented with a forthright exposition of the grievous impact of pollution due to sponge iron industry on the inhabitants dwelling around that area. With clarity and veracity, the film maker is able to express empathy and concern on the acute prevailing problem over human existence.			
Best Promotional Film	Ek Ropa Dhan	Hindi	Producer: Meghnath Bhattacharjee; Director: Biju Toppo and Meghnath Bhattacharjee	₹ 50,000/- Each
Best Promotional Film	Citation: For a succinct and well researched film looking closely at an innovation applied effectively in the farming of rice. The film engages successfully with the issue and makes a strong case for the promotion of the practice called "Ek Ropa Dhan".			
Best Film on Social Issues	Understanding Trafficking	Bengali, Hindi and English	Producer: Cinemawoman; Director: Ananya Chakraborti	₹ 50,000/- Each
Best Film on Social Issues	Citation: To cross the line of limit, becomes an issue of indifference. Along this line, the documentary projects the serious social issue of human trafficking in a very thought provoking manner through stark and gravitating images. It airs an intriguing atmosphere of concerns through dramatised and realistic imageries.			
Best Educational / Motivational / Instructional Film	Advaitham	Telugu	Producer: K. Vijaypal Reddy; Director: Pradeep Maadugula	₹ 50,000/- Each
Best Educational / Motivational / Instructional Film	Citation: For the documentary which exposes the human apathy of class difference through casteism in a very evoking and natural style. Through fun-filled situations and distressing moments, the director portrays the anguished and tragic aspects of casteism effecting human value and relationship.			
Best Exploration / Adventure Film	Boxing Ladies	Hindi	Producer: Satyajit Ray Film and Television Institute; Director: Anusha Nandakumar	₹ 50,000/- Each
Best Exploration / Adventure Film	Citation: For a sensitive portrayal of young aspiring talents in a country where sports as passion/ profession comes up against heavy social odds and family biases. The jury applauds the film for the restrained and elevating treatment of a crucial subject underlining the silent dignity of the characters involved.			
Best Investigative Film	A Pestering Journey	Malayalam, Punjabi, Hindi, English and Tulu	Producer: Ranjini Krishnan; Director: K. R. Manoj	₹ 50,000/- Each
Best Investigative Film	Citation: For the pet detective in a reverse act, an emotive documentary exposing not only stories of cruel impact of pest control on human health but also arrests out attention to a more fundamental question – who is a pest ?.			
Best Short Fiction Film	Kal 15 August Dukan Band Rahegi	Hindi	Producer: Film and Television Institute of India; Director: Prateek Vats	₹ 50,000/- Each
Best Short Fiction Film	Citation: With energy and vigour, the documentary records very interesting images of a group of young students, who are trying to relate, with ideology of freedom and the stifling authoritarian reality. In the process, the life is entangled with intrigues and doubts.			
Best Film on Family Welfare	Love in India	Bengali and English	Producer: Overdose; Director: Kaushik Mukherjee	₹ 50,000/- Each
Best Film on Family Welfare	Citation: Explores and deconstructs the traditional and orthodox landscapes of love, sexuality and conjugal relationships and the dynamics of emerging sexual politics and value systems in contemporary India with clarity and insight laced with subtle humour.			
Best Cinematography	Shyam Raat Seher	Hindi and English	Cameraman: Murali G. Laboratory Processing: Film Lab	₹ 50,000/- Each
Best Cinematography	Citation: For imaginative yet minimal, a balanced and evocative cinematography creates a character out of a city night atmosphere, setting the space and mood for the living characters in their journey beyond the real, nearing mythical.			
Best Audiography	A Pestering Journey	Malayalam, Punjabi, Hindi, English and Tulu	Re-recordist of the Final Mixed Track: Harikumar Madhavan Nair	₹ 50,000/-
Best Audiography	Citation: Does one hear the cry of the pest? In between the sound of the real and evoking music, the ensuing silence tells us the stories beyond.			
Best Editing	Germ	Hindi	Tinni Mitra	₹ 50,000/-
Best Editing	Citation: For the abstract visualisation and endearing black &white tones are very effectively punctuated with fine editing, and in the process it maintains a very subtle and flowing rhythm and pace to carry forward the cinematic work.			
Best Narration / Voice Over	Johar : Welcome to Our World	Hindi and English	Nilanjan Bhattacharya	₹ 50,000/- Each
Best Narration / Voice Over	Citation: For a seamless powerful narrative about the symbiotic intricate relationship, the tribals of Jharkhand have with their forests and their struggle for existence against mindless aggressive development and flawed conservation policies, told with empathy and sincerity.			
Special Mention	Ottayal (One Woman Alone)	Malayalam	Shiny Jacob Benjamin (Director)	Certificate Only
Special Mention	Citation: For a heart warming portrayal of the woman Daya Bai, who trades along a challenging path in quest of truth. The director, delves into the spirit of the woman to understand the theology of liberation, with sincerity and intelligence.			Certificate Only
Special Mention	The Zeliangrongs	Manipuri and English	Ronel Haobam (Director)	Certificate Only
Special Mention	Citation: For a well researched endeavour to reflect a composite group of ethnic communities of common origin and socio-cultural back-ground, which highlights the rich cultural heritage and the tribes’ traditional way of life, which is on the brink of extinction.			Certificate Only
Special Mention	Pistulya	Marathi and Telugu	Suraj Pawar (Child actor)	Certificate Only
Special Mention	Citation: For displaying, under distressing situation and harsh reality, Pistulya, the child protagonist, the authenticity with vibrant and emotive expression.			Certificate Only

=== Best Writing on Cinema ===
The awards aim at encouraging study and appreciation of cinema as an art form and dissemination of information and critical appreciation of this art-form through publication of books, articles, reviews etc.

==== Juries ====
A committee headed by Ashok Vajpeyi was appointed to evaluate the writing on Indian cinema. Following were the jury members:

- Jury Members
  - Ashok Vajpeyi (Chairperson) • H. N. Narahari Rao • Vidyarthi Chatterjee

==== Golden Lotus Award ====
Official name: Swarna Kamal

All the awardees are awarded with 'Golden Lotus Award (Swarna Kamal)' and cash prize.

Name of Award	Name of Book	Language	Awardee(s)	Cash prize
Best Book on Cinema	From Rajahs and Yogis to Gandhi and Beyond: Images of India in International Films of the Twentieth Century	English	Author: Vijaya Mulay; Publisher: Seagull Books	₹ 75,000/- Each
Best Book on Cinema	Citation: Here is a work of rigorous film scholarship which took the author to many lands and consumed many years of her life. Written in a clear lucid style, the book evokes a panoramic view of India that perhaps was through the eyes of several filmmakers of foreign origin. What adds an extra dimension to the book is the author’s narration of her own life in films even as she is engaged in telling the larger events on and off screen.			
Best Film Critic		English	Joshy Joseph	₹ 37,500/- Each
Best Film Critic	Citation: Joshy Joseph, essentially a filmmaker, proves to be an important critic as well, as he goes about writing on the most serious aspects of medium with wry humour and a lightness of touch that is difficult not to notice. His commitment to the documentary in particular sets him apart from many of those writing on cinema in this country.			₹ 37,500/- Each
Best Film Critic		Kannada and English	N. Manu Chakravarthy	₹ 37,500/- Each
Best Film Critic	Citation: Professor Chakravarthy’s writings on film and related arts are replete with profound insights into the human condition as well as the need for serious discourse on socio-cultural matters. His writings reveal the authority with which he can discuss the cinemas of the world, particularly his own Kannada cinema.			₹ 37,500/- Each

==== Special Mention ====
All the award winners are awarded with Certificate of Merit.

Name of Award	Name of Book	Language	Awardee(s)	Cash prize
Special Mention (Book on Cinema)	Cinema Bhojpuri	English	Author: Avijit Ghosh; Publisher: Penguin Books India Pvt. Ltd.	Certificate Only
Special Mention (Book on Cinema)	Citation: Often dismissed as a poor cousin of mainstream Hindi cinema, Bhojpuri cinema, however has many interesting cultural strains that Avijit Ghosh has laid bare. Any one conversant with life in North Bihar and East Uttar Pradesh, or in many lands far beyond, would recognise the importance of this 'subaltern' effort.			Certificate Only
Special Mention (Book on Cinema)	Thiraicheelai	Tamil	Author: Oviyar Jeeva; Publisher: Trisakti Sundar Raman	Certificate Only
Special Mention (Book on Cinema)	Citation: For a sincere attempt to analyse important developments in Tamil films. It also provides an insight into the classics of world cinema, highlighting their aesthetic values.			Certificate Only

=== Awards not given ===
Following were the awards not given as no film was found to be suitable for the award:

- Best Animated Film
- Best Film on Family Welfare
- Best Feature Film in Manipuri
- Best Feature Film in Oriya
- Best Feature Film in Punjabi
- Best Feature Film in Telugu
- Best Agricultural Film
- Best Historical Reconstruction / Compilation Film
- Best Non-Feature Animation Film
- Best Non-Feature Film Music Direction

== Award Ceremony ==
National Film Award medal

58th National Film Award ceremony was held on Friday, 9 September 2011 at Vigyan Bhavan, New Delhi; which is a premier Convention centre of Government of India. Awards were conferred by President of India, Pratibha Patil and ceremony was hosted by actors Mahi Gill and Rajat Kapoor.

With 58th National Film Awards, award certificate and medal went through a makeover. Award certificate layout as well as design was changed to include gold embossed "Ashok Stambh" (Emblem of India) on the A3 size certificate. Swarna Kamal (Golden Lotus) and Rajat Kamal (Silver Lotus) were also redesigned which included the display box for the medals as well.

Ceremony had performances by two of the winners; Suresh Wadkar and Rekha Bhardwaj, who won the award for Best Male Playback Singer and Best Female Playback Singer, respectively. Both sang their respective award-winning songs, "Hey Bhaskara Kshitijavari Ya" from a Marathi film, Mee Sindhutai Sapkal and "Badi Dheere Jali" from a Hindi film, Ishqiya.
