= National Film Award – Special Jury Award (non-feature film) =

Indian film award

- National award for contributions to short film Instituted in 1978
- Sponsored by: Directorate of Film Festivals
- Formerly called: Special Commendation (1978)
- Rewards: Rajat Kamal (Silver Lotus); ₹1,00,000
- First award: 1984
- Final award: 2021
- Most recent winner: Rekha

Highlights
- Total awarded: 39
- First winner: Shri Hemkunt Saahib

The National Film Award – Special Jury Award was one of the National Film Awards presented annually by the Directorate of Film Festivals, the organisation set up by Ministry of Information and Broadcasting, India.

It was one of several awards presented for non-feature films. The recipients of Special Jury Award were awarded with Rajat Kamal (Silver Lotus), cash prize of ₹100,000 (US$1,100) and certificate of merit.

The award was instituted in 1978, at 26th National Film Awards and awarded annually for the short films produced in the year across the country, in all Indian languages. The award was discontinued at the 70th National Film Awards.

== Winners ==
This award considers all the aspects of film making than individual area. Following are the award winners over the years:

List of award recipients, showing the year (award ceremony), awarded as, film(s) and language(s)
| Year | Recipient(s) | Awarded as | Film(s) | Language(s) | Refs. |
|---|---|---|---|---|---|
| 1978 (26th) | No Award | | | | |
| 1979 (27th) | No Award | | | | |
| 1980 (28th) | No Award | | | | |
| 1981 (29th) | No Award | | | | |
| 1982 (30th) | No Award | | | | |
| 1983 (31st) | No Award | | | | |
| 1984 (32nd) | – | – | Shri Hemkunt Saahib | – | |
| 1985 (33rd) | Rajan Khosa | Director | Bodhvriksha | Hindi | |
| 1986 (34th) | Yash Chaudhary | Director | Equal Partners | English | |
| 1987 (35th) | Rajiv Mehrotra | • Producer • Director • Cameraman | Barren Harvest | English | |
| 1988 (36th) | Mani Kaul | Director | Before My Eyes | – | |
| 1989 (37th) | K. R. Mohanan | Director | Kalamandalam Krishnankutty Poduval | Malayalam | |
| 1990 (38th) | Gulzar | Director | Ustad Amjad Ali Khan | Hindi | |
| 1991 (39th) | Aribam Syam Sharma | Director | Meitei Pung | English | |
| 1991 (39th) | B. Narsing Rao | Director | Akruti | – | |
| 1992 (40th) | Salam Karassery | Producer | Noottantinte Sakshi | Malayalam | |
| 1992 (40th) | Sasibhushan | Director | Noottantinte Sakshi | Malayalam | |
| 1993 (41st) | Murali Nair | Director | Tragedy of an Indian Farmer | English | |
| 1993 (41st) | Mahesh Thottathil | Director | Death of a Prodigal Son | • Hindi • English | |
| 1994 (42nd) | Soumitra Sarkar | • Producer • Director • Screenwriter | Games We Played in My Youth | • English • Bengali | |
| 1995 (43rd) | Sehjo Singh | Producer | Sona Maati | Marwari | |
| 1996 (44th) | Nilotpal Majumdar | • Producer • Director • Cinematographer | Dhatu Jhar '96 | Bengali | |
| 1997 (45th) | No Award | | | | |
| 1998 (46th) | Pavan Malhotra | Actor | Faqir | Hindi | |
| 1999 (47th) | Deep Prakash | Director | Of Confucius, S-Spots and Toyguns | • English • Hindi • Marathi • Tamil | |
| 2000 (48th) | Roabin Mazumdar | Producer | A Memory of the Sea | English | |
| 2000 (48th) | Lygia Mathews | Director | A Memory of the Sea | English | |
| 2001 (49th) | Kireet Khurana | Producer | Orchestra | Hindi | |
| 2001 (49th) | Bhimsain | Director | Orchestra | Hindi | |
| 2002 (50th) | Wrik Basu and team | Director | 00:00 | English | |
| 2003 (51st) | Kadhambari Chintamani | Producer | The Lijjat Sisterhood | English | |
| 2003 (51st) | Ajit Oommen | Director | The Lijjat Sisterhood | English | |
| 2003 (51st) | Sudhakar Reddy Yakkanti | Director | Ek Aakash | – | |
| 2004 (52nd) | Amit Dutta | Director | Kshy Tra Ghya | Hindi | |
| 2005 (53rd) | Rakesh Sharma | Director | Final Solution | • Hindi • Gujarati • English | |
| 2006 (54th) | Anuradha Mookerjee | Producer | Lama Dances of Sikkim | English | |
| 2006 (54th) | Manash Bhowmick | Director | Lama Dances of Sikkim | English | |
| 2007 (55th) | Amalan Datta | Producer | Bhultir Khero | Bengali | |
| 2007 (55th) | Anirban Datta | Director | Bhultir Khero | Bengali | |
| 2007 (55th) | Public Service Broadcasting Trust | Producer | Poomaram | Malayalam | |
| 2007 (55th) | Vipin Vijay | Director | Poomaram | Malayalam | |
| 2008 (56th) | Rajesh S. Jala | Director | Children of the Pyre | Hindi | |
| 2009 (57th) | Aasna Aslam | Child actor | Kelkkunnundo | Malayalam | |
| 2010 (58th) | No Award | | | | |
| 2011 (59th) | Anand Patwardhan | Director | Jai Bhim Comrade | Marathi | |
| 2012 (60th) | Shumona Goel | Director | I Am Micro | English | |
| 2012 (60th) | Shai Heredia | Director | I Am Micro | English | |
| 2012 (60th) | Vasudha Joshi | Director | Cancer Katha | English | |
| 2013 (61st) | Girish Kasaravalli | Director | Ananthamurthy – Not A Biography...But A Hypothesis | English | |
| 2013 (61st) | Satyanshu Singh | Director | Tamaash | English | |
| 2013 (61st) | Devanshu Singh | Director | Tamaash | English | |
| 2014 (62nd) | Films Division | Producer | A Poet, A City & A Footballer | English | |
| 2014 (62nd) | Joshy Joseph | Director | A Poet, A City & A Footballer | English | |
| 2015 (63rd) | No Award | | | | |
| 2016 (64th) | Shirley Abraham | Producer and director | The Cinema Travellers | • Hindi; • Marathi | |
| 2017 (65th) | Films Division of India | Producer | A Very Old Man with Enormous Wings | | |
| 2017 (65th) | Prateek Vats | Director | A Very Old Man with Enormous Wings | | |
| 2017 (65th) | FTII | Producer | Monday | | |
| 2017 (65th) | Arun K. | Director | Monday | | |
| 2018 (66th) | Harish Shah | Director | Why Me ? | | |
| 2018 (66th) | Neeraj Singh | Art Director | Ekaant | | |
| 2019 (67th) | Vipin Vijay | Director | Small Scale Societies | English | |
| 2020 (68th) | Ojaswee Sharma | Director | Admitted | • Hindi; • English | |
| 2021 (69th) | Shekhar Bapu Rankhambe | | Rekha | Marathi | |
