= Chethan Naik =

Indian playback singer

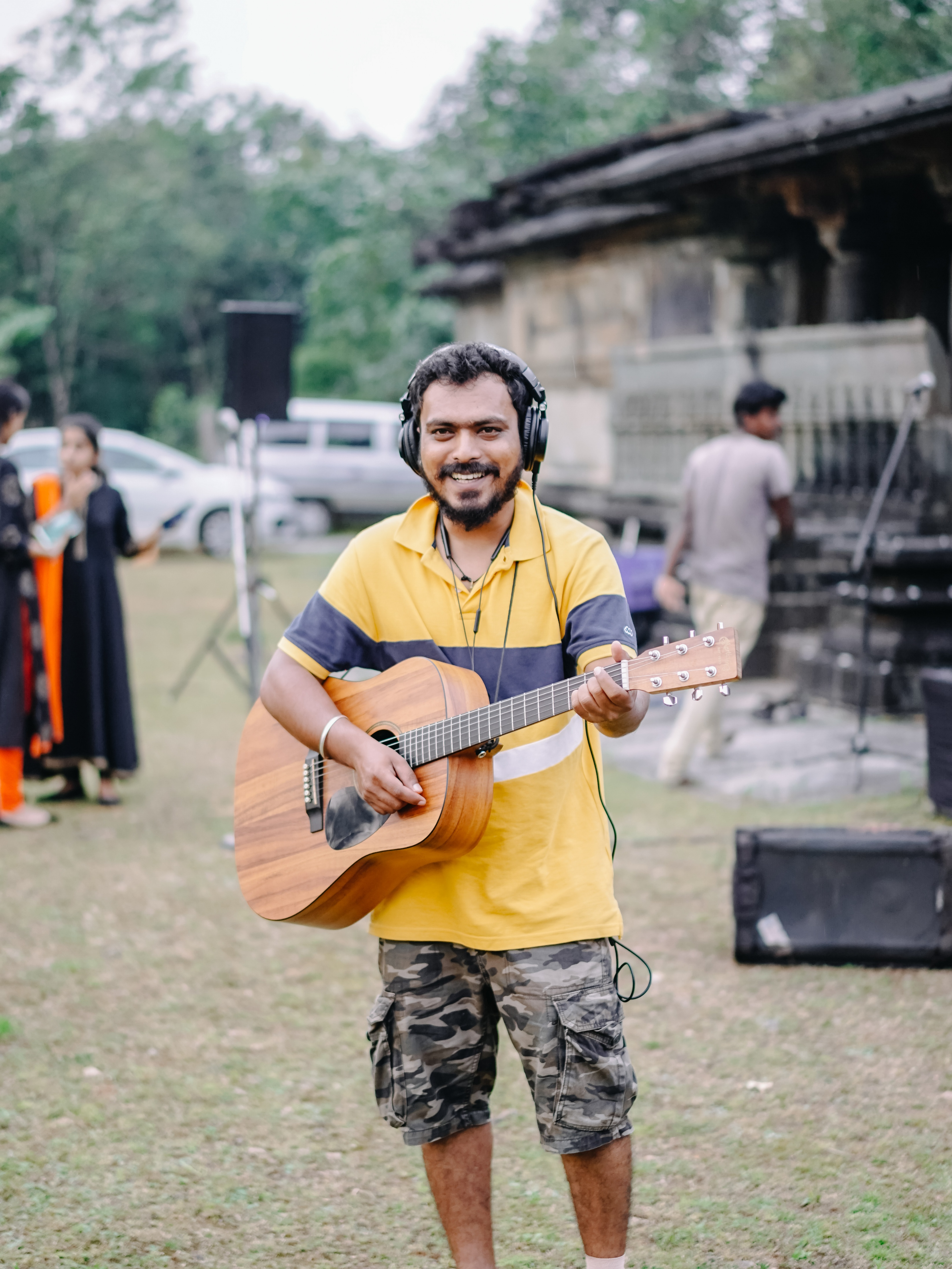

Background information
- Born: 11 March 1989 (age 37); Shimoga, India
- Genres: Rock; Filmi; Hindustani Classical
- Occupations: Singer; Songwriter; Musician
- Instruments: Guitar; Keyboard; Harmonium
- Years active: 2016–present

Chethan Naik is an Indian playback singer who works predominantly in Kannada films.

== Career ==
Chethan was trained in Hindustani classical music in Shivamogga and won Radio City Super Singer 2014. He went on to sing "Gangu Gangu" from Style King (2016), "Avalakki Buwalakki" from Chamak (2017), and "Sultan" and "Ho Jaane Do Aar Paar" from the Hindi dubbed version of KGF: Chapter 1 (2018). He has collaborated with Hemanth Jois as part of the Jois Project for independent singles.

== Discography ==
=== As playback singer ===
==== Films ====
Year	Song	Film	Notes
2016	"Soorya Bandha"	Supari Surya	
2016	"Gangu Gangu"	Style King	Won–KIMA (Kannada International Music Awards) for Best Male Playback Singer - 2017
2017	"Badalaavane"	5G	
2017	"Avalakki Buwalakki"	Chamak	
2018	"Ho Jaane Do Aar Paar"	KGF: Chapter 1	Hindi dubbed version
2018	"Sultan"	KGF: Chapter 1	Hindi dubbed version
2018	"Matte Matte Nenapu"	Kanaka	
2018	"Drinku Madkond"	Swartaratna	
2019	"Life Ene T20"	I Love You	
2019	"Love Annodu Ondh Dodda Roga"	I Love You	
2019	"Hands Up"	Avane Srimannarayana	
2022	"Asura Naa"	Dr. 56	
2022	"Asuranda"	Dr. 56	Tamil songs
2022	"Podhum Indha Vedanai"	Dr. 56	Tamil songs
2024	"Yakovosi Manasu"	Mandyahaida	
2024	"Kannu Irode"	Chow Chow Bath	
2024	"Howda Irabahuda"	Kaagada	
2024	"The Langoti Song"	Langoti Man	
2024	"Jolly Jolly"	Vikaasa Parva	
2024	"Ninna Soki"	Preethsona Mathomme	

==== Music videos ====
Year	Title	Composer	Starring	Ref.
2016	Tunturu	Hemanth Jois	Himself	
2017	Last Semester	Hemanth Jois	Rakesh Maiya, Shivaraj, Ankitha Patla	
2018	Payana	Hemanth Jois	Suman Nagarkar, Rakesh Maiya, Vinutha P G	
2019	Friendzone	Hemanth Jois	Chethan Ram, Archana Kottige and 15 others	
2021	Oh Baby I Love You	Adil Nadaf	Kishen Bilagali, Sonika Gowda	
