= Sasneham Sumithra =

- Directed by: Ambadi Krishnan
- Written by: Ambadi Krishnan
- Produced by: Ambadi Krishnan
- Starring: Suresh Gopi; Ranjini Krishnan
- Cinematography: Saloo George
- Edited by: K.P. Hariharaputhran
- Music by: Ouseppachan
- Release date: 23 January 2004
- Country: India
- Language: Malayalam

Sasneham Sumithra is a 2004 Indian Malayalam-language psychological romance film by Ambadi Krishnan starring Suresh Gopi. It is an uncredited film adaptation of the 1938 novel Rebecca written by Daphne du Maurier. The critically acclaimed romantic psychological thriller film Rebecca (1940) by Alfred Hitchcock was based on this novel.

== Plot ==
Balan is a Navy officer. He falls in love and later marries Sumitra. Later he resigns and settles down with business, but Sumitra's father, and cousin do not like Balan. Under mysterious situations Sumitra commits suicide.

Balan once again marries Warrier's only daughter Seetha. But when the well in Balan's estate gets cleaned, a skeleton is found inside. The forensic reports confirms the skeleton is Sumitra's and that she was murdered by a gun shot to the head. A police officer Inspector Muhammed Kutty investigates the case. He concludes that Sumithra committed suicide as she was suffering from a terminal illness. But Balan and his brother-in-law Shekhar who conducted a parallel investigation on Sumithra's death finds the real murderer of Sumithra, who's Kurup, Balan's associate, who had a grudge against Balan for the accidental murder of his only son, while punishing him, who was Balan's subordinate in the Indian Navy and he is arrested by Inspector Muhammed.

== Cast ==
- Suresh Gopi as Balachandran
- Siddique as C.I Muhammad Kutty
- Renjini Krishnan as Seetha
- Lalu Alex as Dr. Sekhar
- Sai Kumar as Kumar
- Bindu Panicker as Meenakshi
- Poornima Anand as Sekhar's wife
- Kalasala Babu as Ayyappan Kurup
- Gayathri as Devaki

== Soundtrack ==
The music was composed by Ouseppachan and lyrics were written by Shibu Chakravarthy.

Song	Singer
"Agre Pashyaami"	Various
"Enthe Nee Kanna"	Gayathri Asokan
"Enthe Nee Kanna"	K J Yesudas
"Thekku Thekkunnoru"	Asha Menon
