= National Film Award for Best Sound Design (non-feature film) =

Indian film award

- National award for contributions to non-feature films
- Sponsored by: National Film Development Corporation of India
- Formerly called: National Film Award for Best Audiography (1991–2021)
- Rewards: Rajat Kamal (Silver Lotus); ₹2,00,000
- First award: 1990
- Most recent winner: Shubharun Sengupta, Dhundgiri Ke Phool (2023)

The National Film Award for Best Sound Design is one of the National Film Awards presented annually by the National Film Development Corporation of India. It is one of several awards presented for non-feature films and awarded with Rajat Kamal (Silver Lotus).

The award was instituted in 1990, at 38th National Film Awards and awarded annually for the short films produced in the year across the country, in all Indian languages. At the 70th National Film Awards, both Best Audiography and Best On-location Sound Recordist were clubbed to a single category as Best Sound Design. Since then, only the sound designer is eligible for the award.

== Winners ==
Award includes 'Rajat Kamal' (Silver Lotus) and cash prize. Following are the award winners over the years:

Awards legends
*	On-location Sound Recordist (until 2021)

List of award recipients, showing the year (award ceremony), film(s) and language(s)
Year	Recipient(s)	Film(s)	Language(s)	Refs.
1990 (38th)	Sujit Sarkar	Mohor	Bengali	
1991 (39th)	Anil Tendulkar	Sons of Abotani: The Misings	Mishing	
1991 (39th)	Gautam Bora	Sons of Abotani: The Misings	Mishing	
1992 (40th)	Sanjoy Chatterjee	Wangala: A Garo Festival	English	
1993 (41st)	Indrajit Neogi	Maihar Raag	Bengali	
1994 (42nd)	Indrajit Neogi	Another Way of Learning	English	
1994 (42nd)	A. M. Padmanabhan	Another Way of Learning	English	
1995 (43rd)	Shyam Sunder	Tatva	Hindi	
1996 (44th)	Nihar R. Samal	Tat Tvam Asi	Hindi and English	
1997 (45th)	Pankaj Shil	Matir Bhanr	Bengali	
1998 (46th)	Satheesh P. M.	Kumar Talkies	Hindi	
1999 (47th)	Chinmoy Nath	The Vehicle with a Soul of a Man	–	
2000 (48th)	Hari Kumar	A Memory of the Sea	English	
2001 (49th)	Anup Mukherjee	Enough of Silence	English	
2002 (50th)	No Award			
2003 (51st)	Ramesh Birajdar	Bhaba Paagla	Bengali	
2004 (52nd)	Vivek	Kshy Tra Ghya	Hindi	
2005 (53rd)	Anmol Bhave	Closer	–	
2006 (54th)	Partha Barman	Bishar Blues	Bengali	
2007 (55th)	Ajit Singh Rathore	Kramasha	Hindi	
2008 (56th)	Mateen Ahmad	Children of the Pyre	Hindi	
2009 (57th)	Lipika Singh Darai	Gaarud	Hindi and Marathi	
2010 (58th)	Harikumar Madhavan Nair	A Pestering Journey	Malayalam, Punjabi, Hindi, English and Tulu	
2011 (59th)	Gautam Nair	1, 2	Hindi	
2012 (60th)	Harikumar M.	Do Din Ka Mela	Kutchi	
2013 (61st)	Gautam Nair	Chidiya Udh	–	
2014 (62nd)	Anindit Roy	Tender is the Sight	–	
2014 (62nd)	Ateesh Chattopadhyay	Tender is the Sight	–	
2014 (62nd)	Ayan Bhattacharya	Tender is the Sight	–	
2015 (63rd)	Moumita Roy	Edpa Kana	Kurukh	
2016 (64th)	Ajith Abraham George	In Return Just a Book	English	
2017 (65th)	Avinash Sonawane	Pavasacha Nibandha	Marathi	
2017 (65th)	Samarth Mahajan	The Unreserved		
2018 (66th)	Bishwadeep Chatterjee	Children of the Soil		
2018 (66th)	Ajay Bedi	The Secret Life of Frogs		
2019 (67th)	Allwin Rego	Radha	Musical	
2019 (67th)	Sanjay Maurya	Radha	Musical	
2019 (67th)	Saptarshi Sarkar	Rahas	Hindi	
2020 (68th)	Ajit Singh Rathore	Pearl of the Desert	Rajasthani	
2020 (68th)	Sandip Bhati	Jadui Jangal (Magical Forest)	Hindi	
2020 (68th)	Pradeep Lekhwar	Jadui Jangal (Magical Forest)	Hindi	
2021 (69th)	Krishnanunni N R	Ek Tha Gaon	Garhwali and Hindi	
2021 (69th)	Suruchi Sharma	Meen Raag	Rajasthani	
2022 (70th)	Manas Choudhury	Yaan	Hindi and Malwi	
2023 (71st)	Shubharun Sengupta	Dhundgiri Ke Phool	Hindi	
2024 (72nd)	T S Hari Hara Sudhan	Blue	Tamil	
