= Suneel Puranik =

Indian film director

President, Karnataka Chalanachitra Academy
- In office 1 January 2020 – 12 July 2022
- Appointed by: Government of Karnataka
- Preceded by: Nagathihalli Chandrashekhar

Personal details
- Born: Suneel Puranik; 19 August 1965 (age 61) India
- Children: Sagar Puranik and Sameer Puranik
- Education: K.H.K Institute, Dharwad
- Occupation: Actor, Director, Producer

Suneel Puranik (A.K.A. Sunil Puranik) is a National Film Award-winning director; and film and tele-serial actor, director and producer, predominantly working in the Kannada Film and Television Industry. He was the President of the Karnataka Chalanachitra Academy and has served on the jury of the National Film Awards and the International Film Festival of India.

== Early life ==
Suneel was born and brought up in Dharwad. He attended Junior Technical School, Hubli and Karnataka High School, Dharwad, obtained Diploma in Mechanical Engineering from K.H.K Institute, Dharwad and pursued professional training in film making from Adarsha Film Institute, headed at the time by Girish Kasaravalli. Suneel married Suhasini in 1991 and has two sons Sagar Puranik (born 1992), and Sameer Puranik (born 2000).

== Career ==
=== Acting ===
Suneel started his career in film industry as an actor in tele-serial. His first project was Venkataswami Pranaya Prasangagalu directed by M. S. Sathyu.

=== Directing ===
Thereafter he assisted V. Somashekhar in directing movie named Ranaranga and Parashuram. Chirasmarane a Kannada TV serial about freedom fighters from Karnataka such as, Mundaragi Bhimarao, Naragunda Babasaheb, Surapura Venkatappa Nayaka, Sangolli Rayanna, Kitturu Chennamma, etc telecasted by Doordarshan was directed by him 1997. In 2010, he made his directorial debuts with film ‘Gurukula’ about the Gurukula, an education system of our ancient India which won Best Children’s Movie Award State Award in 2009-2010.

=== Academy member ===
He has held various positions in the Kannada Film and Television Industry

- President, Karnataka Chalanachitra Academy
- Member, Karnataka Chalanachitra Nirdeshakara Sangha
- Member, Karnataka Chalanachitra Prashasti Samithi

=== Jury ===
- 64th National Film Awards (feature films, South II panel)
- Indian Panorama at International Film Festival of India (IFFI) - 2018
- IFFI - 2024 (Debut Films)

== Filmography ==
Year	Title	Actor	Director	Role	Notes
1992	Chevalier Michael	Yes	No	Ignatiaus	Malayalam film
2003	Abhi	Yes	No	Joseph	
2010	Gurukula	No	Yes		Karnataka State Film Award for Best Children Film
2016	Lift Man	Yes	No		
TBA	Kappu Gulabi †	No	Yes		Filming
2023	Hondisi Bareyiri	Yes	No		
2023	Kabzaa	Yes	No	Sankeshwara	

== TV Series ==
As Actor

Year	Title	Channel
2000–2001	Devru Devru Devru	Udaya TV
2001–2002	Danda Pindagalu	Udaya TV
2003–2004	Moodala Mane	ETV Kannada
2011–2012	Thangali	Udaya TV
2014–2016	Putta Gowri Madhuve	ETV Kannada
2016–2017	Mahasati	Udaya TV
2020–2021	Manasaare	Udaya TV
2024–2025	Chikkejamani	Udaya TV

As director

Year	Title	Channel
1997–1998	Chirasmarane	Doordarshan
2016–2017	Mahasati	Udaya TV

== Awards & accolades ==
Suneel has been awarded numerous awards and accolades for his work. The most important ones are as follows:

- National Film Award
- Kempegowda Award in 2009
- Karnataka Rajyothsava Award (2009) by Government of Karnataka
- Aryabhata Award
- Best Children Film Awardee for his directorial film ‘Gurukula’.
- Chitra Rasikara Prashasti for his role in the tele-serial Sangolli Rayanna.
- Act Television award
- Indira Priyadarshini Award
- ‘Communicator of the Year’, Award from Public Relations Counsel of India.
