= Mitalee Jagtap Varadkar =

Indian actress

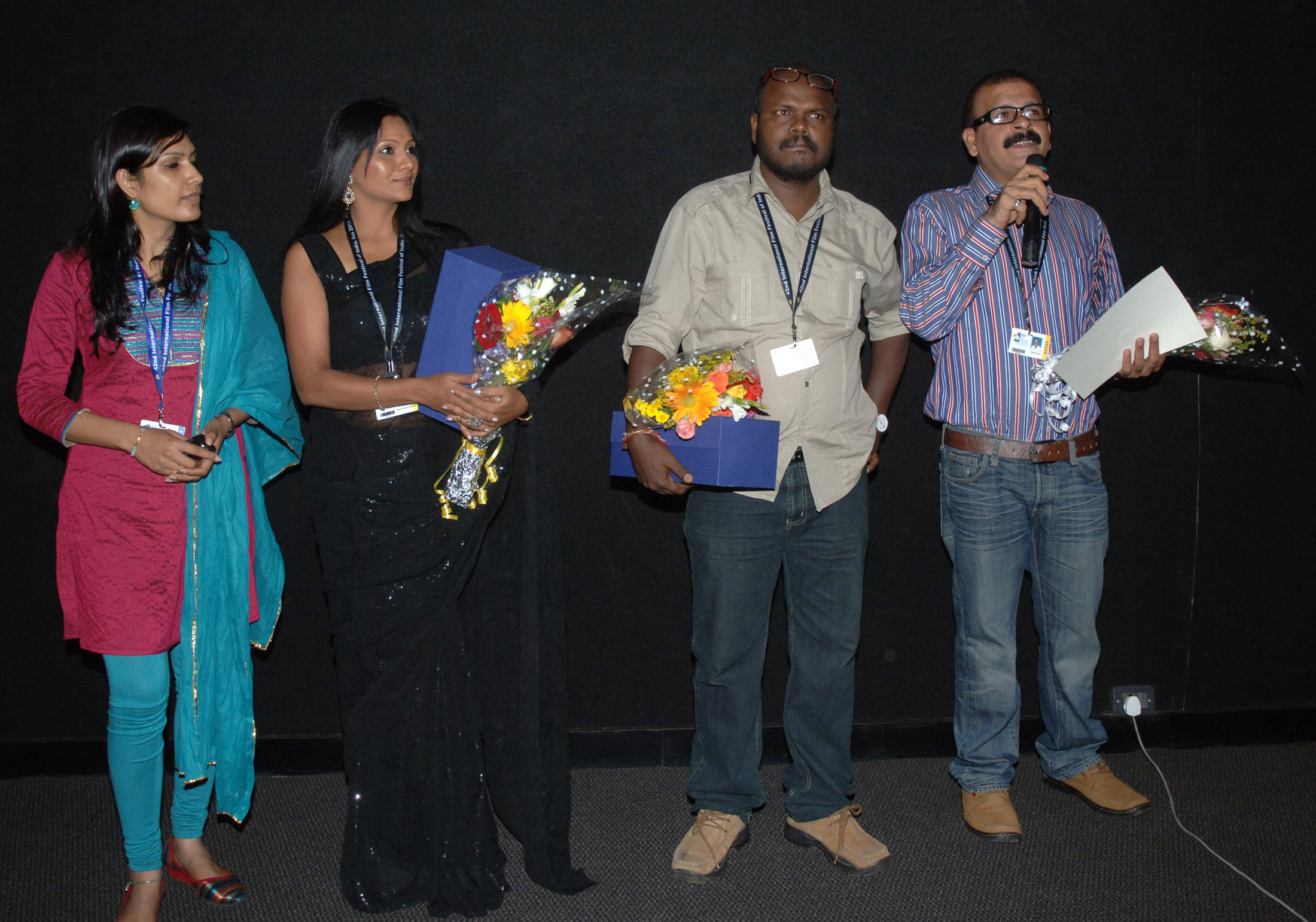
- Mitalee Jagtap Varadkar, IFFI (2011)
- Born: Mitalee Jagtap
- Occupation: Actress

Mitalee Jagtap Varadkar is an Indian actress who works in the Marathi film industry. She is known for her role in the film Baboo Band Baaja (2010), which earned her a National Film Award for Best Actress at the 58th National Film Awards. The award was presented by the jury for portraying with finesse a mother who strives to achieve for her son a better future than the one denied to her by circumstances. She shared this award title with Saranya Ponvannan for the latter's role in the Tamil film Thenmerku Paruvakaatru.

Varadkar is a trained classical dancer and did experimental theatre in Aurangabad, Maharashtra before moving on to her film career.

== Filmography ==
Year	Film	Language	Notes
2000	Raju	Marathi	
2001	Kkusum	Hindi	TV Series
2003	Vadalvaat	Marathi	TV Series
2005	Aai Ekveerecha Udo Udo	Marathi	
2003	Vithal Vithal	Marathi	
2010	Baboo Band Baaja	Marathi	National Film Award for Best Actress
2013	Satyagraha	Hindi	
2013	Asava Sundar Swapnancha Bangla	Marathi	TV Series
2015	Manatlya Unhat	Marathi	
2016	Taleem	Marathi	
2017	Ghat	Marathi	
2019	Nashibvaan	Marathi	
2022	Gangubai Kathiawadi	Hindi	
