= Avane Srimannarayana (soundtrack) =

2019 soundtrack album by Charan Raj and B. Ajaneesh Loknath

- Soundtrack album cover

Soundtrack album by Charan Raj and B. Ajaneesh Loknath
- Released: 13 December 2019
- Recorded: 2018–2019
- Genre: Feature film soundtrack
- Length: 23:44
- Language: Kannada
- Label: Divo
- Producer: B. Ajaneesh Loknath; C. R. Bobby

Charan Raj chronology
Kavaludaari (2019)	Avane Srimannarayana (2019)	Popcorn Monkey Tiger (2020)

B. Ajaneesh Loknath chronology
Padde Huli (2019)	Avane Srimannarayana (2019)	Dia (2020)

Avane Srimannarayana is the feature film soundtrack for the 2019 film of the same name composed by Charan Raj and B. Ajaneesh Loknath. Ajaneesh also provided the background score, in collaboration with the Macedonian Symphonic Orchestra. The film has four songs in the Kannada version, two songs in both Telugu and Tamil version and one song in Malayalam and Hindi version.

The film's lead single "Hands Up" was released in all five versions on 13 December 2019, the same day as the rest of the soundtrack. The soundtrack featured lyrics written by Nagarjuna Sharma, Vivek, Ramajogayya Sastry, Sudamsu and Raqueeb Alam for the respective versions.

== Production ==
Originally, Charan Raj was announced in the film's team, composing music for the film, with his name being credited in the first poster. Later B. Ajaneesh Loknath, was also hired to provide the score and songs. According to producer Pushkara Mallikarjuna, he stated "The film has four songs in total. Usually, the movie songs will be given more importance for shooting. But we decided to shoot the whole picture as exclusive. Each shot is unique, which contains more details. The movie will be released in different languages, so we shot in a way it should reach all kind of audience."

Ajaneesh, who produced the background music for the film, worked with an orchestra from Macedonia, Greece. This marked the first time that background music for a Kannada film was recorded in Europe. In an interview with The Times of India, Ajaneesh explained, "We have recorded parts of the background music in Macedonia, Europe. It is not that we don't have musicians here, but we wanted a big orchestra with a string and horn section specifically. So, we decided to get the theme songs recorded from this team in Macedonia. This group has recorded with A. R. Rahman sir on earlier occasions. Having an epic project like Avane Srimannarayana, required an orchestra of such magnitude."

The background score of the film has multiple cultural inferences. Ajaneesh further stated that "Music plays a pivotal part in the movie, and the background score is a mix of music associated with Indian mythology, Carnatic music, and western classical with Arabic influences. While we were inspired by the themes for iconic Hollywood characters like Sherlock Holmes and Jack Sparrow, the score we have composed is original. We have about seven themes and these move with the narrative. Audiences will be able to connect and form parallels between the music and the storyline. I have also composed two songs for the film. One is an introduction song that plays out in a fight sequence at a pub. The tune has middle-eastern influences as well as the peppy strains that one would associate with cowboys. And since the storyline is set in the 1980s, I have tried to bring in an old school flavour. The song is in chaste Kannada, thanks to the lovely lyrics by Nagarjuna. The second track is a climax number, which signifies an important moment for the protagonist Narayana. The song is partly in Mayamalavagowla raga, and also has a middle-eastern strain."

== Release ==
Since the makers decided not to tie with any other music labels, Rakshit Shetty released the album through Divo, a digital streaming portal. The rights to stream the album were bought by Gaana, through their online music streaming platform.

The film's lead single "Hands Up" was released in all five versions on 13 December 2019. It was sung by Vijay Prakash with backing vocals by Shashank Sheshagiri, Pancham Jeeva and Chethan Naik, with lyrics by Nagarjuna Sharma for the original version, Vivek for the Tamil version, Ramajogayya Sastry for the Telugu version, Sudamsu for the Malayalam version and Raqueeb Alam for the Hindi version. The same day, the makers unveiled the soundtrack album in all five languages.

== Track listing ==
=== Kannada ===
All lyrics are written by Nagarjuna Sharma.

No.	Title	Music	Singer(s)	Length
1.	"ASN Trailer Theme"	B. Ajaneesh Loknath	Instrumental	4:18
2.	"Hands Up"	B. Ajaneesh Loknath	Vijay Prakash, Shashank Sheshagiri, Pancham Jeeva, Chethan Naik	4:26
3.	"Narayana Narayana"	Charan Raj	Anurag Kulkarni, Ananya Bhat	4:48
4.	"Sadheya Dharisi"	Charan Raj	Dhanush Jagadeesh, Narayan Sharma, Sujith Sureshan	5:45
5.	"Idu Charitre Srushtisuva Avatara"	B. Ajaneesh Lokanath	B. Ajaneesh Lokanath	4:26
Total length:				23:44

=== Tamil ===
All lyrics are written by Vivek.

No.	Title	Music	Singer(s)	Length
1.	"ASN Trailer Theme"	B. Ajaneesh Loknath	Instrumental	4:18
2.	"Hands Up"	B. Ajaneesh Loknath	Vijay Prakash, Shashank Sheshagiri, Pancham Jeeva, Chethan Naik	3:50
3.	"Narayana Narayana"	Charan Raj	Anthony Daasan, Ananya Bhat	4:45
Total length:				12:54

=== Telugu ===
All lyrics are written by Ramajogayya Sastry.

No.	Title	Music	Singer(s)	Length
1.	"ASN Trailer Theme"	B. Ajaneesh Loknath	Instrumental	4:18
2.	"Hands Up"	B. Ajaneesh Loknath	Vijay Prakash, Shashank Sheshagiri, Pancham Jeeva, Chethan Naik	3:50
3.	"Narayana Narayana"	Charan Raj	Anurag Kulkarni, Ananya Bhat	4:45
Total length:				12:54

=== Malayalam ===
All lyrics are written by Sudamsu.

No.	Title	Music	Singer(s)	Length
1.	"ASN Trailer Theme"	B. Ajaneesh Loknath	Instrumental	4:18
2.	"Hands Up"	B. Ajaneesh Loknath	Renjith, Shashank Sheshagiri, Pancham Jeeva, Chethan Naik	3:50
3.	"Narayana Narayana"		Anthony Daasan, Madhuvanti Narayanan	4:41
Total length:				13:25

=== Hindi ===
All lyrics are written by Shellee.

No.	Title	Music	Singer(s)	Length
1.	"ASN Trailer Theme"	B. Ajaneesh Loknath	Instrumental	4:18
2.	"Hands Up"	B. Ajaneesh Loknath	Vijay Prakash, Shashank Sheshagiri, Pancham Jeeva, Chethan Naik	3:51
Total length:				8:10

== Background score ==
The background score of the film was released on 6 June 2020, coinciding with Rakshit Shetty's birthday. It was released as a jukebox format in YouTube, as well as in all music streaming platforms. It has 17 tracks composed by B. Ajaneesh Loknath.

No.	Title	Length
1.	"Ramrams Justice"	1:54
2.	"Dichotomy of King"	2:52
3.	"The Witty King"	1:43
4.	"The Prophecy"	2:02
5.	"Her Revelation"	0:52
6.	"The Other Him"	2:54
7.	"Deciphering The Clue"	1:07
8.	"His Adventures"	3:11
9.	"His Final Offer"	0:38
10.	"His Next Move"	1:15
11.	"Jayaram The Monster"	1:43
12.	"The Anguish of Jayaram"	2:13
13.	"When Tables Turn"	2:01
14.	"The Final Showdown"	2:03
15.	"The Final Bow"	0:52
Total length:		28:17
