= Pistulya =

- Official release poster
- Directed by: Nagraj Manjule
- Written by: Nagraj Manjule (Story, Screenplay)
- Produced by: Nagraj Manjule
- Starring: Suraj Pawar; Vaishali Kendale; Prashant Kamble; Vitthal Bulbule; Sanket Pavase; Nagraj Manjule
- Cinematography: Gargee Kulkarni; Kutub Inamdar
- Edited by: Kutub Inamdar
- Music by: Santosh Khatmode
- Production companies: Aatpat Production; New Arts DCS
- Release date: 2009
- Running time: 18 minutes
- Country: India
- Language: Marathi
- Budget: ₹1.5 lakh

Pistulya is an Indian Marathi-language short film written and directed by Nagraj Manjule and jointly produced by Aatpat Production and New Arts DCS. The film won National Film Award for Best First Non-Feature Film of a Director and Best Child Artist Award in Non-feature Film category at the 58th National Film Awards. The film features Suraj Pawar in the title role, Vaishali Kendale, and Nagraj Manjule in pivotal roles. The film focuses on the story of a village boy, struggle to educate himself against the odds.

Nagraj Manjule created the film as part of his mass communication course at Pune University, aiming to capture the ethos of a marginalized community living as tramps and address social stigma while expressing a desire for reform. The film was shot over two days in Ahmednagar, with a production cost of ₹1.5 lakh funded by Manjule's friends and family.

The film was screened at Vaanam Art Festival on 8 April 2023.

== Plot ==
Pistulya, an 8-year-old boy from the marginalized Waddar community, suddenly loses his father and faces severe poverty alongside his mother. Striking a desperate deal for quick cash, he falls into the clutches of local thugs. However, while navigating this perilous path, a chance encounter with a school assembly stirs something profound within him. Observing peers of his age, clad in clean uniforms and reciting prayers, he glimpses a world entirely separate from his own. Through the wire-mesh fence, a vision of a brighter future dawns on him. Driven by a deep desire to give his younger sister, Lali, a better life, Pistulya finds the determination to break free from the cycle of exploitation and pursue an education.

== Cast ==
- Suraj Pawar as Pistulya
- Vaishali Kendale as Laxmi, Pistulya's mother
- Prashant Kamble as Bhiku Anna
- Vitthal Bulbule as Maruti
- Sanket Pavase as Sugrya
- Nagraj Manjule as Ambadas

== Production ==
=== Development ===
Manjule created the film as part of his mass communication course at Pune University. He mentions the challenge of capturing the ethos of a community living the life of tramps and dealing with social stigma, while also expressing a desire for reform. Nagraj credits his own life experiences for helping him achieve this effect within a 15-minute timeframe.

=== Filming and casting ===
The film was shot over a two-day period in Ahmednagar, with a production cost of ₹1.5 lakh, funded by Manjule's friends and family, using a Sony NX 100 camera. The cast is drawn from Nagraj's own group of friends. He stated "It was perhaps easy for me to identify with the characters shown in the film, because I myself come from the Waddar community (those who hammer and break stone slabs) to which the protagonist, Pistulya, belongs." Suraj Pawar was offered the role when the director visited his school in Karmala. Nagraj intends to expand this 15-minute project into a full-length feature film to deliver a compelling social message that he believes will resonate with numerous marginalized and stigmatized communities across the country.

== Critical response ==
Aishwarya Raj of The Mooknayak wrote "Instead of a happy ending or a sad ending, the film ends with hope, a bitter truth and a question." A reviewer from The Indian Wire is highlighting the impactful storytelling of the short film. He emphasize how the film sheds light on the struggles and challenges faced by the protagonist, Pistulya, and his widowed mother. He also commend the unexpected yet effective ending of the film.

== Accolades ==
=== Awards ===
==== National Film awards ====
- National Film Award for Best First Non-Feature Film of a Director – Nagraj Manjule
- Best Child Actor – Suraj Pawar

==== Other ====
- Maharashtra Times – Best Short Film Award
- Aarohi Film festival Mumbai 2009 – Best Short Film and Best Actor Award
- Nashik International Film Festival 2009 – Best Actor and Golden Camera Award
- Hyderabad Film festival 2010 – Best Short Film Award
- 20th IDPA Film festival Mumbai 2009 – Certificate of Merit
- Pratibimb Short Film Festival, Ahmednagar 2009 – Second Best Short Film Award

=== Nominations ===
- Children Film Festival Lucknow 2010
- Goa Marathi Film Festival 2011
- Asian Film Festival 2009
- Kolkata International Film Festival 2010
- ICE Short Film Festival Pune 2010
- Mumbai international Film festival 2010
- Tathya Film Festival Hyderabad 2010
- Asiatica Film Mediate Film Festival
