= National Film Award – Special Mention (non-feature film) =

Indian film award

- National award for contributions to non-feature films Instituted in 1978
- Sponsored by: National Film Development Corporation of India
- Formerly called: Special Commendation (1978)
- Reward: Certificate of merit
- First award: 1978
- Most recent winner: M. K. Ramadas and Himansu Sekhar Khatua (2023)

The National Film Award – Special Mention is one of the National Film Awards presented annually by the National Film Development Corporation of India. It is one of several awards presented for non-feature films. The recipients of Special Mention are awarded with certificate of merit.

The award was instituted in 1978, at 26th National Film Awards and awarded annually for the short films produced in the year across the country, in all Indian languages.

== Winners ==
Award includes only certificate of merit for the recipients of Special Mention. This award considers all the aspects of film making than individual area. Following are the award winners over the years:

List of award recipients, showing the year (award ceremony), awarded as, film(s) and language(s)
| Year | Recipient(s) | Awarded as | Film(s) | Language(s) | Refs. |
|---|---|---|---|---|---|
| 1978 (26th) | Loksen Lavnani for Films Division | Director | The Burning Stone | English | |
| 1979 (27th) | No Award | | | | |
| 1980 (28th) | Adoor Gopalakrishnan | Producer and Director | The Chola Heritage | English | |
| 1980 (28th) | Films Division | Producer | Pampa | English | |
| 1980 (28th) | P. C. Sharma | Director | Pampa | English | |
| 1981 (29th) | No Award | | | | |
| 1982 (30th) | No Award | | | | |
| 1983 (31st) | National Institute of Design | Producer | Jalshakti | Hindi | |
| 1983 (31st) | I. S. Mathur | Director | Jalshakti | Hindi | |
| 1983 (31st) | Kerala State Film Development Corporation | Producer | Thalam | Malayalam | |
| 1983 (31st) | Joy Mathew | Director | Thalam | Malayalam | |
| 1983 (31st) | National Institute of Design | Producer | Energy-Merry-Go-Round | English | |
| 1983 (31st) | – | Best Biographical Film | Veer Savarkar | Marathi | |
| 1983 (31st) | – | Best Scientific Film | Handling Fuel Oils Fission Power 306 Rejuvenation | English | |
| 1983 (31st) | – | Best Exploration/Adventure Film | Against Current Exploration Antarctica | English | |
| 1983 (31st) | – | Best Anthropological/Ethnographic Film | Cobra: The Snake God | English | |
| 1983 (31st) | – | Best Anthropological/Ethnographic Film | Perumkaliattam | Malayalam | |
| 1983 (31st) | – | Best Anthropological/Ethnographic Film | Leather Puppetry of Karnataka | English | |
| 1983 (31st) | – | Best Anthropological/Ethnographic Film | Nishan | Hindi | |
| 1983 (31st) | – | Best Exploration/Adventure Film | Against Current Exploration Antarctica | English | |
| 1983 (31st) | – | Best Historical Reconstruction Film | Tambaccucha Samna | Marathi | |
| 1983 (31st) | – | Best Historical Reconstruction Film | Bidaai | Hindi | |
| 1984 (32nd) | No Award | | | | |
| 1985 (33rd) | FTII | Producer | Prisoners of Circumstances | Telugu | |
| 1985 (33rd) | Ramesh Handoo | Director | Prisoners of Circumstances | Telugu | |
| 1985 (33rd) | R. K. Gupta | Producer | Anukaram | Telugu | |
| 1985 (33rd) | Gul Bahar Singh | Director | Anukaram | Telugu | |
| 1986 (34th) | No Award | | | | |
| 1987 (35th) | Ashok Gunjal | Cameraman | The Kingdom of God | English | |
| 1988 (36th) | N. H. Prasad | Director | Dispossession | English | |
| 1989 (37th) | No Award | | | | |
| 1990 (38th) | Raj Gopal Rao | Director | Technique of Seed Production in Wheat and Paddy | English | |
| 1990 (38th) | Siddharth Kak | Director | Cactus and Roses | English | |
| 1990 (38th) | Dilip Ghose | Director | Aadhi Haqueeqat Aadha Fasana | Hindi | |
| 1990 (38th) | Naresh Saxena | Director | Sambandh | Hindi | |
| 1991 (39th) | Debal Basu | Director | Living on the Junk | English | |
| 1992 (40th) | No Award | | | | |
| 1993 (41st) | No Award | | | | |
| 1994 (42nd) | Arun Kumar Roy | Director and Screenwriter | Of Tagore and Cinema | English | |
| 1994 (42nd) | Gautam Haldar | Director | The Story of Integration | English | |
| 1994 (42nd) | Kaviyoor Sivaprasad | Director, Screenwriter and Editor | Ormaynde Theerangalil | Malayalam | |
| 1995 (43rd) | Arvind Singh | Director | Ajit | Hindi | |
| 1995 (43rd) | Rashmi Film Society | Producer | Ithihasathile Khasak | English and Malayalam | |
| 1995 (43rd) | Biswadeb Dasgupta | Producer and Director | Majhi | Bengali | |
| 1996 (44th) | No Award | | | | |
| 1997 (45th) | Gul Bahar Singh | Director | Gotipua | English | |
| 1998 (46th) | Unni Vijayan | Director | Jee Karta Tha | Hindi | |
| 1999 (47th) | Vinod Subramanian | Director | Fire | English and Hindi | |
| 2000 (48th) | Amal Neerod C. R. | Cameraman | Meena Jha | Hindi | |
| 2000 (48th) | Haimanti Banerjee | Director | Balgandharv | Marathi | |
| 2001 (49th) | A. R. Tripathi | Producer | Kalahandi | Odia and English | |
| 2001 (49th) | Sonali Kulkarni | Actress | Chaitra | Marathi | |
| 2002 (50th) | Raja Mitra | Director | Kalighat Paintings And Drawings | English | |
| 2003 (51st) | Shilpi Dasgupta | Director | Mangali: An Exorcision | – | |
| 2003 (51st) | Aseem Bose | Cameraman | Water | English | |
| 2004 (52nd) | No Award | | | | |
| 2005 (53rd) | Vibhu Puri | Director | Chabiwali Pocket Watch | Hindi | |
| 2005 (53rd) | Bidyut Kotoky | Director | Bhraimoman Theatre | Assamese | |
| 2006 (54th) | Kuldip Sinha | Producer | Special Children | English | |
| 2006 (54th) | Suresh Menon | Director | Special Children | English | |
| 2007 (55th) | No Award | | | | |
| 2008 (56th) | Aniket Rumade | Child actor | Vitthal | Marathi | |
| 2009 (57th) | Nikita Bhagat | Cinematographer | Vilay | – | |
| 2010 (58th) | Shiny Jacob Benjamin | Director | Ottayal (One Woman Alone) | Malayalam | |
| 2010 (58th) | Ronel Haobam | Director | The Zeliangrongs | Manipuri and English | |
| 2010 (58th) | Suraj Pawar | Child actor | Pistulya | Marathi and Telugu | |
| 2011 (59th) | Spandan Banerjee | Director | You Don't Belong | Bengali and English | |
| 2011 (59th) | Renu Savant | Director | Airawat | Marathi and Hindi | |
| 2012 (60th) | Priya Goswami | Director | Pinch of Skin | English and Hindi | |
| 2012 (60th) | Andrea Iannetta | Director | Allah Is Great | English, Hindi and Danish | |
| 2012 (60th) | Sanjay Jangid | Animator | Raah | – | |
| 2013 (61st) | Shweta Ghosh | Director | Accsex | English and Hindi | |
| 2013 (61st) | Kavita Bahl | Director | Candles in the Wind | Punjabi and Hindi | |
| 2013 (61st) | Nandan Saxena | Director | Candles in the Wind | Punjabi and Hindi | |
| 2013 (61st) | Madonne Ashwin | Director | Dharmam | Tamil | |
| 2013 (61st) | Rajdeep Paul | Director | At the Cross Roads : Nondon Bagchi Life and Living | English and Bengali | |
| 2013 (61st) | Sarmistha Maiti | Director | At the Cross Roads : Nondon Bagchi Life and Living | English and Bengali | |
| 2014 (62nd) | Mrinal Dev | Director | Gunjaa | English | |
| 2014 (62nd) | Manoj Kumar Nitharwal | Director | Seek and Hide | English | |
| 2014 (62nd) | Ruchir Arun | Director | 5 O'Clock Accident | English | |
| 2015 (63rd) | Arun Shankar | Director | The Chameleon | English | |
| 2015 (63rd) | Neelan | Director | Amma | Malayalam | |
| 2015 (63rd) | Varun Tandon | Director | Syaahi | Hindi | |
| 2016 (64th) | Soumya Sadanandan | Director | Chembai: Descoperire A Mea Unei Legende | | |
| 2016 (64th) | Ramen Borah | Director | Sikar Aru Sitkar | | |
| 2016 (64th) | Sibanu Borah | Director | Sikar Aru Sitkar | | |
| 2016 (64th) | Amitabh Parashar | Director | The Eyes of Darkness | | |
| 2017 (65th) | Jayaraj | Director | Rebirth | | |
| 2017 (65th) | Rukshana Tabassum | Director | Cake Story | | |
| 2017 (65th) | Swapnil Vasant Kapure | Director | Afternoon | | |
| 2018 (66th) | Sagar Puranik | Director | Mahaan Hutatma | Kannada | |
| 2018 (66th) | Ramana Dumpala | Director | Glow Worm in a Jungle | English | |
| 2018 (66th) | Sameer and Kishore Sadhwani | Director | Laddoo | Hindi | |
| 2019 (67th) | No Award | | | | |
| 2020 (68th) | No Award | | | | |
| 2021 (69th) | Ganesh Babu | Director | Karuvarai | Tamil | |
| 2021 (69th) | Srikanth Deva | Music director | Karuvarai | Tamil | |
| 2022 (70th) | Aimee Baruah | Producer and Director | Birubala: Witch to Padmashri | Assamese | |
| 2022 (70th) | Partha Sarathi Mahanta | Director | Hargila – The Greater Adjutant Stork | Assamese | |
| 2022 (70th) | PI Entertainment | Producer | Hargila – The Greater Adjutant Stork | Assamese | |
| 2023 (71st) | M. K. Ramadas | Producer and Director | Nekal – Chronicle of The Paddy Man | Malayalam | |
| 2023 (71st) | Himansu Sekhar Khatua | Director | The Sea & Seven Villages | Odia | |
| 2023 (71st) | Kadambini Media Pvt. Ltd. | Producer | The Sea & Seven Villages | Odia | |
