= A Pestering Journey =

- Directed by: K.R. Manoj
- Written by: Ranjini Krishnan; K.R. Manoj
- Cinematography: Shehnad Jalal
- Edited by: Mahesh Narayanan; Ajay Kuyiloor
- Music by: A.S. Ajithkumar
- Production companies: Tropical Cinema; Positive Frames; Chitranjali Studios
- Release date: 2010
- Running time: 66 minutes
- Country: India
- Languages: English, Malayalam, Punjabi, Hindi, Tulu

A Pestering Journey is a documentary film directed by K.R. Manoj. It was released in 2010. K.R. Manoj and Ranjini Krishnan are the scriptwriters of the documentary.

== Plot ==
A Pestering Journey's plot is about two parallel pesticide catastrophes in post-independent India. The film investigates pest control technologies and their associated language, drawing parallels to concepts of genocide. By blurring the lines between extermination and survival, it reflects on the complexities faced by affected communities.

== Awards and nominations ==
- 58th National Film Awards
- National Film Award for Best Investigative Film
- National Film Award for Best Non-Feature Film Audiography – Harikumar Madhavan Nair
