= Sagar Puranik =

Indian film director

- Born: Sagar Puranik; 27 August 1992 (age 34); Bhusawal, India
- Citizenship: Indian
- Education: PES University
- Occupations: Actor, Model, Director
- Years active: 1997 - present
- Notable work: Dollu - 11th SIIMA; Mahaan Hutatma
- Father: Suneel Puranik
- Awards: Special Mention Award in 66th NFA, 2019; Best Debut Director (Kannada) - 11th SIIMA

Sagar Puranik is a National Award winning director and actor who predominantly works in Kannada film and Television industry. Sagar made his film debut with Ring Road Suma (2015), which is notable for, it was made by an all-women crew, the first in Kannada language. He was selected as the best debut director (Kannada) in the 11th South Indian International Movie Awards for Dollu, the film won two awards for Best Feature Film – Kannada.

== Early and personal life ==
Sagar was born in 1992. He has completed his PU from Jain University, Bengaluru and obtained his degree from PES University, Bengaluru.

== Career ==
Sagar started his acting career when he was 5 years old with Nargund Baba Saheb, a TV serial about freedom fighters from Karnataka and in TV serial Chirasmarane both by Doordarshan. Thereafter, a bi-lingual TV serial, titled Natyarani Shantala directed by G. V. Iyer. He appeared in TV serials titled Rajkumari directed by Shruthi Naidu for Zee Kannada, Anju Mallige in Kasturi Channel, Thangali and Madarangi for Udaya TV directed by B. Suresha, Mahasati for Udaya TV directed by Suneel Puranik. In 2015, Sagar acted in the hit film Ring Road Suma. His non-featured short film on Bhagat Singh won Special Mention Award in 66th National Film Awards, 2019.

== Filmography ==
Year	Film	Role	Director	Notes
2015	Ring Road Suma	Kiran	Priya Belliappa	Film Acting Debut
2018	Mahaan Hutatma	Chandrashekhar Azad	Sagar Puranik debut for non-feature	66th NFA
2021	Dollu		Sagar Puranik debut for feature film	11th SIIMA - Best Feature Film in Kannada
2021	Kappu Gulabi	Chintan	Suneel Puranik	Unreleased
2026	Second Case of Seetharam	Shiva	Devi Prasad Shetty	
2026	Venkya †	Lead	Himself	

== Awards ==
Year	Award	Film	Credits	Category	Result
2019	66th National Film Awards	Mahaan Hutatma	Director	Special Mention Award	Won
2022	68th National Film Awards	Dollu	Director	Best Feature Film in Kannada	Won
2023	11th South Indian International Movie Awards	Dollu	Best Debut Director	Best Feature Film in Kannada	Won
