= Suraj Pawar =

Indian actor

- Born: Phophalaj, Solapur district, Maharashtra, India
- Occupation: Actor
- Years active: 2009–present
- Awards: National Film Award for Best Child Artist – Pistulya (2009)

Suraj Pawar is an Indian actor who works in Marathi cinema, debuted in Nagraj Manjule's 2009 Marathi-language short film Pistulya, for which he received the National Film Award for Best Child Actor in the Non-feature film category. Pawar is predominantly known for his collaborations with Manjule, appearing in several of his films, including Sairat (2016).

== Early life ==
Suraj Pawar hails from Pophalaj village in Karmala taluka of Solapur district. As Suraj has no parents, he has been living with Nagraj Manjule's family in Pune for 9–10 years. Suraj has three siblings.

== Career ==
Pawar made his first appearance with the short film Pistulya, for which he was awarded the National Film Award for Best Child Actor in the non-feature film category. The role was offered when Nagraj Manjule visited his school in Karmala. He co-starred with Somnath Awghade in the 2013 film Fandry as a lead actor. Sairat had a career breakthrough and gained popularity among the audiences in 2016.

== Filmography ==
=== Films ===
Year	Film	Role	Notes	Ref.
2009	Pistulya	Pistulya	Debut; won the National Film Award in "non-feature film" category	
2013	Fandry	Piraji "Pirya"		
2016	Sairat	Prince		
2023	Ghar Banduk Biryani			

== Awards ==
Year	Award	Category	Nominated work	Result	Ref(s)
2009	National Film Award – Special Jury Award (non-feature film)	Best Child Actor	Pistulya	Won	

== Lawsuits ==
Mahesh Waghadkar, a resident of Bhenda village in Nevasa taluka of Ahmednagar district files an FIR against some people who claim to be employees of the Mantralaya in Mumbai. Waghadkar has accused him of promising him a government job in the Mantralaya (Secretariat). The accused demanded Rs 5 lakh along with an advance of Rs 2 lakh for the job and also took the money from Waghadkar at Rahuri bus stand on 4 September. Although Waghadkar paid the money and the accused promised to give him a job, Waghadkar became suspicious and approached the police on 9 September. The police arrested the accused Dattatraya Kshirsagar, Akash Shinde, Omkar Tarte on the same day and confirmed that they were not employees of the Mantralaya. Pawar's name came up during the investigation and he was taken to Rahuri police station for questioning.

After that, Pawar shared a detailed post on Facebook saying: Police tortured me for last 15 days while I was in police custody. Print and digital media have also accused me of defaming me by spreading rumors all over Maharashtra without any verification.
