= KGF: Chapter 1 (soundtrack) =

2018 soundtrack album by Ravi Basrur

- Soundtrack album cover

Soundtrack album by Ravi Basrur
- Released: 20 December 2018
- Recorded: 2015–2018
- Genre: Feature film soundtrack
- Length: 19:21
- Language: Kannada
- Labels: Lahari Music; T-Series; Saregama (One song)
- Producer: Ravi Basrur
External audio
- Audio Jukebox on YouTube

Ravi Basrur chronology
Umil (2018)	K.G.F: Chapter 1 (2018)	Bazaar (2019)

Singles from K.G.F: Chapter 1
- 1. "Salaam Rocky Bhai" Released: 4 December 2018; 2. "Garbadhi" Released: 9 December 2018; 3. "Sidila Bharava" Released: 12 December 2018; 4. "Jokae" Released: 15 December 2018; 5. "Dheera Dheera" Released: 17 December 2018

KGF: Chapter 1 is the soundtrack album of the 2018 Indian period action film of the same name. Ravi Basrur, who composed the score, was recorded in over three years, and several musicians and orchestras, across the world, had attributed to the film score and music. The Tamil, Telugu, Malayalam and Kannada versions of the album, were released by Lahari Music on 7 December 2018, whereas the Hindi version's soundtrack, marketed by T-Series, released two days later. Lyricists for the film songs are: Dr. V. Nagendra Prasad, Kinnal Raj and Basrur (Kannada), Prasad and Mohammed Aslam (Hindi), Kabilan and Madhurakavi (Tamil), Ramajogayya Sastry (Telugu) and Sudamsu (Malayalam).

== Development ==
Ravi Basrur composed the songs and the background score, in his second collaboration with Prashanth Neel, after Ugramm (2014). The composition and recording of the film's music took more than three years, and about 400 musicians from various parts of the world, 20 sound producers and prominent orchestras working on the score cues, increased anticipation around the film's music. In order to experiment with the score, Basrur had composed the tunes mostly through keyboard. He added that the score will be "on par with Hollywood standards" and had met Hollywood technicians and record producers for the score. He further added, "The cinematographer [Bhuvan Gowda] and I have worked closely to ensure there's a sync in ideas of the director. Even though I have done very few films, I feel that sound designing plays a prominent role".

== Release ==
Lahari Music bought the audio rights of Kannada, Tamil, Telugu and Malayalam versions of the soundtrack album for a record sum of ₹3.6 crores beating the previous record of Baahubali 2: The Conclusion, whereas the soundtrack album of its Hindi version were acquired by T-Series.

The track "Salaam Rocky Bhai" was served as the lead single from the soundtrack album. It was released in Kannada, Tamil, Telugu and Malayalam on 7 December 2018, along with the full soundtrack album; whereas the album for the Hindi version was released on 9 December 2018. The lyrical version of the song crossed 2.3 million views and received good response from the audience.

Tanishk Bagchi recreated the song "Gali Gali" from the 1989 film Tridev (composed by Kalyanji–Anandji, written by Anand Bakshi and sung by Alka Yagnik), for the Hindi version of the soundtrack. The single which was sung by Neha Kakkar with additional lyrics by Rashmi Virag, was released on 13 December 2018. Basrur also re-created Upendra Kumar's "Jokae" from the 1970 film Paropakari, (originally written by Chi. Udayashankar and R. N. Jayagopal and sung by L. R. Eswari), with the recreated version sung by Airaa Acharya. It was released as a single on 15 December 2018 in all dubbed languages. D. Imman provided an additional number and karaoke versions of the songs, which has been individually released in a separate album on 27 December 2018.

== Track listing ==
=== Kannada ===
No.	Title	Lyrics	Singer(s)	Length
1.	"Salaam Rocky Bhai"	Dr. V. Nagendra Prasad	Vijay Prakash, Santhosh Venky, Sachin Basrur, Puneeth Rudranag, Mohan, Shreenevas Moorthi, Vijay Urs	4:05
2.	"Garbadhi"	Kinnal Raj, Ravi Basrur	Ananya Bhat	2:41
3.	"Sidila Bharava"	Ravi Basrur	Ananya Bhat, Santhosh Venky, Sachin Basrur, Puneeth Rudranag, Mohan H, Shreenevas Moorthi, Vijay Urs	3:31
4.	"Jokae" (originally composed by Upendra Kumar and re-created by Ravi Basrur)	Chi. Udayashankar, R. N. Jayagopal	Airaa Acharya (originally sung by L. R. Eswari)	3:44
5.	"Dheera Dheera"	Ravi Basrur	Ananya Bhat, Santhosh Venky, Sachin Basrur, Puneeth Rudranag, Mohan Krishna, Shreenevas Moorthi, Vijay Urs	3:42
6.	"Kooti Kanasugala"	Kinnal Raj, Ravi Basrur	Ananya Bhat, Abhinav Bhat	1:50
Total length:				19:21

=== Hindi ===
No.	Title	Lyrics	Music	Singer(s)	Length
1.	"Salaam Rocky Bhai"	Nagendra Prasad	Ravi Basrur	Vijay Prakash, Santhosh Venky, Sachin Basrur, Puneeth Rudranag, Mohan, Shreenevas Moorthi, Vijay Urs	4:05
2.	"Gali Gali" (originally composed by Kalyanji–Anandji and recreated by Tanishk Bagchi)	Anand Bakshi, Rashmi Virag	Tanishk Bagchi	Neha Kakkar	2:54
3.	"Kokh Ke Rath Mein"	V. Nagendra Prasad	Ravi Basrur	Ananya Bhat	2:40
4.	"Ho Jaane Do Aar Paar"	V. Nagendra Prasad	Ravi Basrur	Ananya Bhat, Santhosh Venky, Sachin Basrur, Puneeth Rudranag, Mohan H, Shreenevas Moorthi, Vijay Urs, Abhishek Chaithra Soman, Chethan Naik, Madhwesh Bharadwaj	3:30
5.	"Sab Ke Sapnon Ki"	Mohammed Aslam	Ravi Basrur	Airaa Acharya	1:49
6.	"Sultan"	V. Nagendra Prasad	Ravi Basrur	Ananya Bhat, Santhosh Venky, Sachin Basrur, Puneeth Rudranag, Mohan Krishna, Shreenevas Moorthi, Vijay Urs, Abhishek Chaithra Soman, Chethan Naik, Madhwesh Bharadwaj	3:37
Total length:					18:35

=== Telugu ===
All lyrics are written by Ramajogayya Sastry.

No.	Title	Singer(s)	Length
1.	"Salaam Rocky Bhai"	Vijay Prakash, Sri Krishna, Lokeshwar, Arun Kaundinya, Adithya Lyengar, Ganta Rithesh, Santhosh Venky, Mohan Krishna, H. Shreenivas Moorthi, Vijay Urs	4:05
2.	"Tharagani Baruvaina"	Ananya Bhat	2:41
3.	"Evvadikevvadu Banisa"	Ananya Bhat, Sri Krishna, Lokeshwar, Santhosh Venky, Arun Kaundinya, Adithya Lyengar, Ganta Rithesh, Mohan Krishna, H.S Srinivasa Murthy, Vijay Urs	3:40
4.	"Dochai" (originally composed by Upendra Kumar and re-created by Ravi Basrur)	Airaa Acharya	3:44
5.	"Dheera Dheera"	Ananya Bhat, Sri Krishna, Lokeshwar, Santhosh Venky, Arun Kaundinya, Adithya Iyengar, Ganta Rithesh, Mohan Krishna, H.Shreenivas Moorthi, Vijay Urs	3:42
6.	"Alasina Ashalaku"	Ananya Bhat, Abhinav Bhat	1:50
Total length:			19:21

=== Tamil ===
No.	Title	Lyrics	Singer(s)	Length
1.	"Salaam Rocky Bhai"	Kabilan	Don, Vijay Prakash, Mohan Krishna, Santhosh Venky, Renjith Unni, Balaraj Jagadeesh Kumar, Yogi Sekar, H. S. Srinivasa Murthy, Vijay Urs	4:05
2.	"Karuvinil Enai"	Madhurakavi	Ananya Bhat	2:41
3.	"Veesum Soora Kaatin"	Madhurakavi	Ananya Bhat, Mohan Krishna, Santhosh Venky, Renjith Unni, Balraj Jagadeesh Kumar, Yogi Sekar, H. S. Srinivasa Murthy, Vijay Urs	3:40
4.	"Mogam" (originally composed by Upendra Kumar and re-created by Ravi Basrur)	Kabilan	Airaa Acharya	3:44
5.	"Dheera Dheera"	Madhurakavi	Ananya Bhat, Mohan Krishna, Santhosh Venky, Renjith Unni, Balraj Jagadeesh Kumar, Yogi Sekar, H. S. Srinivasa Murthy, Vijay Urs	3:42
6.	"Koodi Kanavil"	Madhurakavi	Ananya Bhat, Abhinav Bhat	1:50
Total length:				19:21

=== Malayalam ===
All lyrics are written by Sudamsu.

No.	Title	Singer(s)	Length
1.	"Salaam Rocky Bhai"	Vijay Prakash, Mohan Krishna, Renjith Unni, Balaraj Jagadeesh Kumar, Deepesh, Abhishek Chitra Somani	4:05
2.	"Garbadhinam"	Ananya Bhat	2:41
3.	"Shwasa Kattin"	Ananya Bhat, Mohan Krishna, Renjith Unni, Balraj Jagadeesh Kumar, Deepesh A K, Abhishek Chithra Soman	3:40
4.	"Jodi" (originally composed by Upendra Kumar and re-created by Ravi Basrur)	Airaa Acharya	3:44
5.	"Dheera Dheera"	Ananya Bhat, Mohan Krishna, Renjith Unni, Balraj Jagadeesh Kumar, Deepesh A K, Abhishek Chithra Soman	3:42
6.	"Koodi Kanavugal"	Ananya Bhat, Abhinav Bhat	1:50
Total length:			19:21

== Background score ==
The background score was composed and conducted by Ravi Basrur.

K.G.F: Chapter 1 (Vol. 1)

Film score by Ravi Basrur
- Released: 10 September 2019
- Recorded: 2018–2019
- Studios: Hombale Films Studio, Bangalore
- Genre: Film score
- Length: 20:20
- Language: Kannada
- Label: Lahari Music
- Producer: Ravi Basrur
External audio
- Film Score on YouTube

K.G.F: Chapter 1 (Original Soundtrack) - Volume 1
No.	Title	Length
1.	"Biggest Criminal In India"	0:36
2.	"Your El Dorado"	1:28
3.	"Mother's Lullaby"	0:43
4.	"Mother's Promise"	1:07
5.	"Enroute Bombay"	1:22
6.	"My Name is Rocky"	0:23
7.	"Rise of KGF"	1:38
8.	"Rocky with Butcher Knife"	0:46
9.	"Shetty Confronts Rocky"	0:36
10.	"Andrew's Arrival"	1:22
11.	"Rocky Decides To Rule"	1:03
12.	"Kamal's Intro"	0:52
13.	"Bun Scene"	1:52
14.	"Rocky's Encounter With Trucks"	0:39
15.	"Rocky, Since 1951"	1:25
16.	"Petrol"	1:01
17.	"Garuda Theme"	0:47
18.	"To El-Dorado"	0:57
19.	"Rocky's Research"	1:00
20.	"Mother & Child Killed"	0:49
Total length:		20:20

K.G.F: Chapter 1 (Vol. 2)

Film score by Ravi Basrur
- Released: 12 October 2019
- Recorded: 2018–2019
- Studios: Hombale Films Studio, Bangalore
- Genre: Film score
- Length: 20:13
- Language: Kannada
- Label: Lahari Music
- Producer: Ravi Basrur
External audio
- Film Score on YouTube

K.G.F: Chapter 1 (Original Soundtrack) - Volume 2
No.	Title	Length
1.	"Gun Assembly"	1:17
2.	"Timer"	0:56
3.	"All About Narachi"	1:27
4.	"Entering Narachi"	1:01
5.	"Introduction to Narachi"	1:08
6.	"Anticipation"	1:28
7.	"Monster"	1:20
8.	"Rocky Bombay Theme"	0:34
9.	"Garuda Theme 2"	1:21
10.	"Brave Theme"	0:33
11.	"Rugga will Enter"	0:39
12.	"He is the Saviour"	0:57
13.	"Daga Daga Daga"	0:35
14.	"Rebel Among Slave"	0:56
15.	"Rocky will Protect Us"	0:41
16.	"Countdown to Hammertime"	0:35
17.	"Blind Man Fight"	0:26
18.	"Fixing Hammer"	1:48
19.	"Rocky Planning"	0:36
20.	"Maari Jaathre"	0:38
21.	"Rocky Walks Up the Stairs"	1:28
Total length:		20:13
