= Mahaan Hutatma =

2018 Kannada short film by Sagar Puranik

- Theatrical poster
- Directed by: Sagar Puranik
- Screenplay by: Sagar Puranik; Akshara Bharadwaj; Shravan
- Produced by: Akshay Chandrashekhar (Akshay Entertainment)
- Starring: Akshay Chandrashekhar; Sagar Puranik; Adhvithi Shetty; Srinath
- Cinematography: Abhilash Kalathi
- Edited by: Mahesh S
- Music by: Ananth Kamath
- Production companies: Akshay Entertainment Banglore; Puranik Productions
- Release date: 2018
- Country: India
- Language: Kannada

Mahaan Hutatma is a 2018 Kannada-language short film directed by Sagar Puranik and produced by Akshay Chandrashekhar, under the banners of Akshay Entertainment in Associate with Puranik Productions. Starring Akshay Chandrashekhar, Sagar Puranik, Adhvithi Shetty and Srinath, It is the first Kannada-language short film to win National Film Award – Special Mention for a non-feature film.

The short film tells the story of Bhagat Singh, an Indian revolutionary who was executed in 1931.

== Cast ==
- Akshay Chandrashekhar
- Sagar Puranik
- Adhvithi Shetty
- Srinath
- Achintya Puranik
- Varun Srinivas
- Kuldeep
- Manoj
- Shashi Kumar
- Peter Grabinski
