= Ring Road (film) =

2015 film by Priya Belliappa

- Promotional poster
- ರಿಂಗ್ ರೋಡ್
- Directed by: Priya Belliappa
- Produced by: Ranjini Ravindra Das
- Starring: Altmash Shakreen; Nikita Thukral; Sagar Puranik; Duniya Vijay
- Cinematography: Reshmi Sarkar
- Edited by: Maryann D'souza
- Music by: Poongudi Dhanraj
- Production company: Cinema Mane
- Distributed by: Bahaar Films
- Release date: 22 October 2015
- Running time: 163 minutes
- Country: India
- Language: Kannada

Ring Road is a 2015 Indian Kannada crime drama film directed by Priya Belliappa and produced by Ranjini Ravindra Das. It stars Altmash Shakreen in the lead role. The supporting cast features Nikita Thukral, Duniya Vijay, Avinash, Malavika Avinash, Patre Ajith, Shrunga B. V. and Sagar Puranik. The film is based loosely on the infamous murder of software engineer Girish by his fiancée Shubha in Bangalore in 2003. The film was produced by an all-women crew, a first in Kannada-language cinema.

== Cast ==
- Altmash Shakreen as Suma / Khushi
- Duniya Vijay as Khan
- Avinash
- Malavika Avinash
- Nikita Thukral
- Patre Ajith
- Neethu
- Sagar Puranik
- Shrunga BV
- Kishori Ballal
- Nethra
- Padmaja Rao
- Chitra Shenoy
- Srinagar Kitty in a cameo appearance
- Prem in a cameo appearance
- Sanjjana in a cameo appearance

== Production ==
=== Development ===
In an interview with The Indian Express in December 2013, the director Priya Belliappa said that the crew of the film mainly consisted of more than 18 people including associates, most of whom made their first outing with the film. Both alumni of Film and Television Institute of India, the film was a first for cinematographer Reshmi Sarkar and director Priya Belliappa. The crew also included producer Ranjini Ravindra Das, editor Maryann D'Souza, music director Vani Harikrishna. The rest of the crew including the costume designer, dialogue writer, choreographer and art director, she said, was formed through friends and acquaintances, most of who were spread across India.

=== Casting ===
For the female lead role, over 500 girls were auditioned with the team finally zeroing in on ten. Following this, Altmash Shakreen, who previously had appeared in advertisements was chosen to play the lead role of Khushie, in May 2014. Another debutant, Sagar Puranik was signed to play the role of Shubha's (Khushie's) boyfriend. Considering that the film was the first in Kannada language to have been made by an all-women crew, most actors in the film worked for free. Vijay took a remuneration of ₹1 for his role. Making a cameo appearance in a song, actor Prem Kumar, reports said, gave the director ₹101 as a token of appreciation and good luck. Playback singing for the song was done by actor and film director, Sudeepa, who also worked for free.

=== Title change ===
Initially titled Ring Road Shubha, the makers faced objection from Central Board of Film Certification (CFBC) citing guidelines "which prohibit using names of any known person with or without their permission." Shubha was said to be a direct reference to Shubha, who was involved in a murder of her fiancée in 2003, and on which incident the film was said to be based. The Regional Censor Officer Nagendra Swamy said of it, "The guidelines are clear that you cannot make references to any known person without their permission." Following this, the title of the film was changed to Ring Road Suma. The title was changed to Ring Road Suma in January 2015, with a tagline Sumala Kathe (Suma's story). In June 2015, makers facing objection from Karnataka Film Chamber Of Commerce (KFCC), finalised on the title Ring Road with the tagline omitted.

== Soundtrack ==
Ring Road

Soundtrack album by Vani Harikrishna
- Released: 29 September 2014
- Recorded: 2014
- Genre: Feature film soundtrack
- Length: 16:29
- Label: Cinema Mane
- Producer: Ranjini Ravindra Das

Vani Harikrishna composed the music for the soundtracks, who also penned the lyrics along with Rekha Rani and Ranjini Ravindra Das. The soundtrack album consists of five tracks. It was released on 29 September 2014, in Bangalore.

Track listing
No.	Title	Lyrics	Singer(s)	Length
1.	"Kanasige Koneyilla"	Rekha Rani	Sudeepa	2:35
2.	"Alieasa"	Rekha Rani	Sangeetha Katti, Vani Harikrishna	4:08
3.	"Enne Etu Mama"	Ranjini Ravindra Das	Santhosh Venky	3:13
4.	"Pom Pom"	Vani Harikrishna	V. Harikrishna, Vani Harikrishna	3:12
5.	"Yakinge"	Vani Harikrishna	Lakshmi Vijay	3:21
Total length:				16:29
