= Venkya =

Indian film

- Promotional poster
- Directed by: Sagar Purannik
- Written by: Sagar Puranik
- Screenplay by: Shreenidhi DS
- Produced by: Pawan Wadeyar; Avinash V Rai; Mohan Lal Menon
- Starring: Sagar Puranik; Rupali Sood
- Cinematography: Pranav Mulay
- Music by: Hemanth Jois
- Release date: November 2024 (IFFI)
- Country: India
- Language: Kannada

Venkya is a 2024 Indian Kannada-language film directed and written by Sagar Puranik. It is produced by Wadeyar Films along with Pawan Wadeyar, Avinash V Rai and Mohan Lal Menon. The film stars Sagar Puranik and Rupali Sood. The film was officially selected for the Indian Panorama Feature Film category and premiered at the 55th International Film Festival.

== Cast ==
- Sagar Puranik
- Rupali Sood
- Yash Raj Soni

== Plot ==
Venkya's Journey follows a struggling goon from Hubballi as he searches for his estranged brother, Ganya, to secure property rights and escape financial ruin. Using social media, Venkya embarks on a cross-India journey, encountering diverse cultures, scams, and kind strangers. Along the way, he undergoes personal growth, embracing humility and family values, in a tale of redemption and self-discovery.

== Shooting ==
The shooting of the film started on 15 March 2024, in Hubbali. The film was shot across 12 states of India, showcasing the country's cultural diversity.
