= Hemanth Jois =

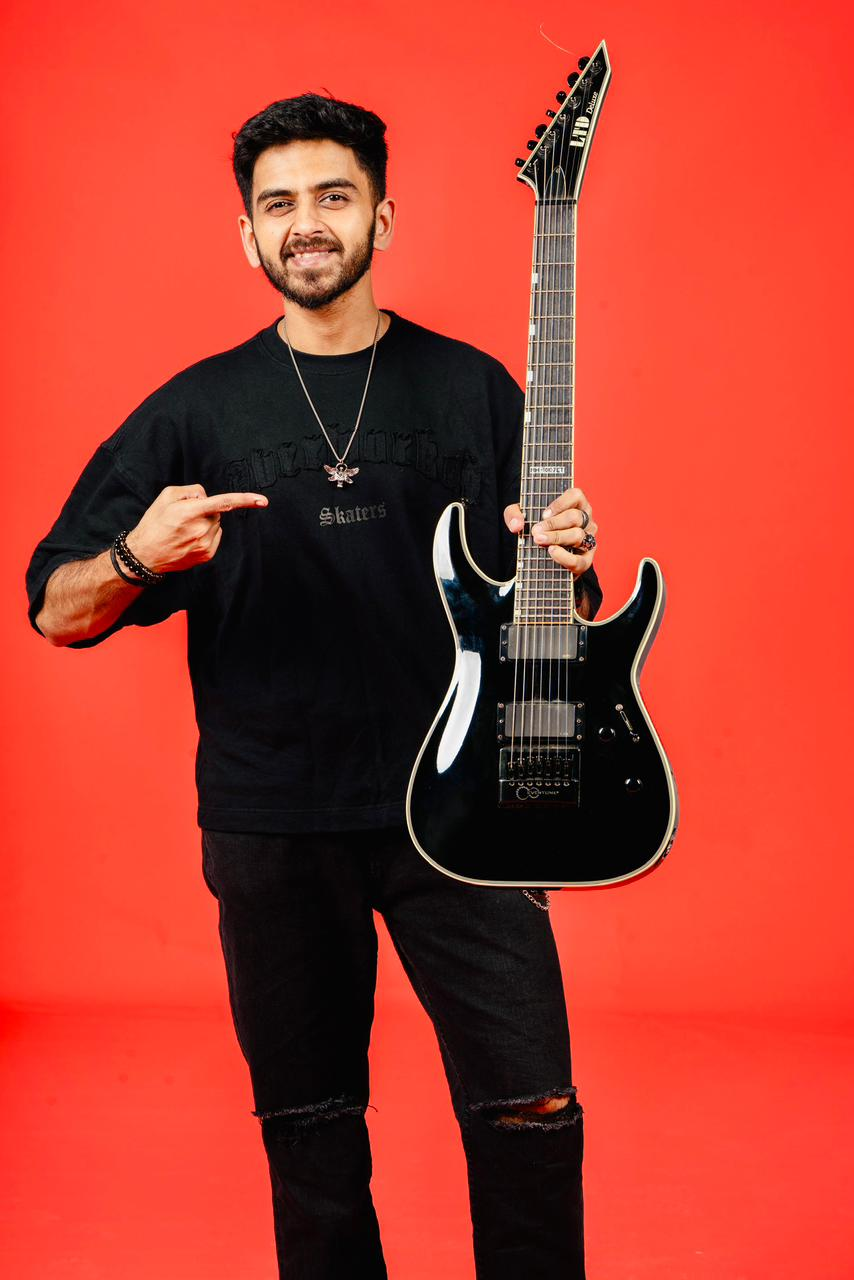

Background information
- Born: 24 December 1991 (age 34); Karnataka, India
- Origin: Koppa, Karnataka, India
- Genres: Rock; Filmi
- Occupation: Music Director

Hemanth Jois is an Indian composer, known for his independent singles and work in the Kannada film industry.

== Early life and career ==
Originally from Koppa, India, Hemanth cites Raghu Dixit and Linkin Park as one of his inspirations and he learned guitar by himself. He completed his MBA at Manipal and was as a member of the indie band Last Semester during his final year. He worked for two years in marketing and sales before taking up a career in music. He did a metal cover of the song "Keli Premigale" from Yuga Purusha (1989) and a cover of the songs "Santhoshakke" and "Kelade Nimageega" from Geetha (1981). He collaborated with singer Chethan Naik for the Jois Project and released their first single "Tunturu", which was shot in Malnad. Their second single was the metal song "Last Semester", which was set in a college.

== Discography ==
=== Films ===
Year	Title	Notes
2018	Aranyakanda	
2018	Statement	
2019	Nammuru Kunigal	
2020	Aadhyam	Unreleased film
2021	Soham	
2024	Entha Kathe Maaraya	
2024	Chow Chow Bath	
2024	Timmana Mottegalu	
2024	Venkya	
2025	Yuddhakaanda Chapter 2	Score and 1 song

=== Other work ===
==== Video games ====
- PUBG Mobile India (2021) – Theme Track

==== EPs ====
Year	Title	Songs	Language	Ref.
2024	Sleeping With Snakes	"Paralysed"	English	

==== Music videos ====
Year	Title	Singer	Lyricist	Starring	Notes	Ref.
2016	Tunturu	Chethan Naik	Pratap C R	Chethan Naik	Won–KIMA (Kannada International Music Awards) for Best Indie Artist - 2017-18; Won–KIMA (Kannada International Music Awards) for Shankar Nag Youth Award - 2017-18	
2017	Last Semester	Chethan Naik	Pratap C R	Rakesh Maiya, Shivaraj, Ankitha Patla		
2018	Payana	Chethan Naik	Pratap C R	Suman Nagarkar, Rakesh Maiya, Vinutha P G		
2019	Friendzone	Chethan Naik	Ashwin R Kodange	Chethan Ram, Archana Kottige and 15 others		
2020	Aagalla Maadesha	Chethan Naik	Himself	Sunetra Pandit, Lakshmi, Arundathi Jois, Keshav, Vinay Kanive, Shankar Murty, Prajna Bhat, Sujith Agam Shetty, Gurudutt Badiger and 17 others		
2020	Ram Darbar	Chethan Naik, Anjana Padmanabhan	Pramod Maravante	—N/a		
2021	Khushi	Chethan Naik	Ashwin Kodange (Kannada), Chinmaya (English)	Lalitamma Ruchith Ullal, Vinay Kanive		
2022	Khushi 2	Chethan Naik	Pramod Maravanthe (Kannada), Chinmaya (English)	Sundarshree, Himself, Vinay Kanive		
