= Vikaasa Parva =

- Official poster
- Directed by: K Anbu Aras
- Written by: Vishruth Naik
- Produced by: Nagesh H.P
- Starring: Rohith Nagesh; Bala Rajwadi; Ashwin Hassan; Swathi
- Cinematography: Naveen Suvarna K
- Edited by: Srinivas Kalaal
- Music by: APO
- Production company: Mind Thoughts Media
- Distributed by: Deewin Media
- Release date: 13 September 2024
- Running time: 113 minutes
- Country: India
- Language: Kannada

Vikaasa Parva (Vikaasaparva) is a 2024 Indian Kannada language drama film directed by K. Anbu Aras, with a screenplay by Vishruth Naik, who also served as the executive producer. The film was produced by Nagesh H.P and Sameer under the banner of Mind Thoughts Media. Rohith Nagesh takes the lead in the movie. The film features Bala Rajwadi, Ashwin Hassan, Swathi. The cinematography is by K. Naveen Suvarna, editing by Srinivas Kalaal, the music score was composed by APO. The action sequences were choreographed by Tiger Shivu, dance choreography by Dhanu Kumar and Jai master.

Vikaasa Parva was released theatrically on 13 September 2024.

== Plot ==
Vikaasa Parva centers on Vikas Chandra, a man born into privilege who leads a life dominated by alcohol, indulgence, and reckless behavior. Vikas's lifestyle revolves around excess and a lack of responsibility, and despite the death of a close friend, he remains indifferent, continuing his destructive patterns. The loss does not prompt him to evaluate his choices, and he continues his lifestyle without acknowledging the impact of his actions.

Vikas's personal life becomes strained due to his behavior, especially his relationship with his wife, Sharada, who struggles to support him. In an attempt to get away, they embark on a road trip. However, while intoxicated, Vikas chooses a shortcut that leads them into a series of unforeseen and dangerous situations. These event force Vikas to confront the consequences of his action and the toll his behavior has taken on both his life and his relationship with Sharada.

As the narrative progresses, Vikas faces a critical turning point that challenges his perspective, as Vikas begins to reassess his past decisions, it follows his efforts to reconcile with Sharada and to change his ways, while addressing the broader consequences of addiction and hasty choices.

== Cast ==
- Rohith Nagesh as Vikas Chandra
- Swathi as Sharada
- Ashwin Hassan as Pradeep
- Kuri Ranga as Sathish
- Vignesh
- Bala Rajwadi
- Sameer Saragad
- Krithi
- Renuka Haneef
- Harsha
- Santhu Chikkamagaluru
- Bhagya
- Nishitha Gowda

== Music ==
Vikaasa Parva

Soundtrack album by APO
- Released: 12 August 2024
- Recorded: 2024
- Genre: Feature film soundtrack
- Length: 11:24
- Language: Kannada
- Label: Lahari Music | T-Series

Official audio
- Vikaasa Parva - Full Album on YouTube on YouTube

The soundtrack for Vikaasa Parva was composed by APO, with lyrics by V. Nagendra Prasad. The soundtrack was released by Lahari Music. The tracks include:

No.	Title	Singer(s)	Length
1.	"Irulinaache Belakina Haadu"	Harsha Uppar	03:36
2.	"Payana Payana"	Anuradha Bhat	03:38
3.	"Jolly Jolly"	Chethan Naik	03:51

== Production ==
The principal photography of Vikaasa Parva began in February 2024, coinciding with the title announcement. The film was shot at multiple locations across Karnataka. The official trailer was released in August 2024, followed by its theatrical release on 13 September 2024. The movie was certified U/A by the CBFC.
