= Paropakari =

- VCD cover
- Directed by: Y. R. Swamy
- Screenplay by: Y. R. Swamy
- Starring: Rajkumar; Jayanthi
- Cinematography: R. Chittibabu
- Edited by: P. Bhaktavatsalam
- Music by: Upendra Kumar
- Production company: Bhagavathi Productions
- Release date: 1970
- Running time: 160 minutes
- Country: India
- Language: Kannada

Paropakari is a 1970 Indian Kannada language romantic drama film written and directed by Y. R. Swamy. It stars Rajkumar and Jayanthi. It revolves around the story of a self respecting young man who wins a wager with his wealthy father. The film was produced under Bhagavathi Productions. It had a very successful soundtrack composed by Upendra Kumar.

Rajkumar played dual role in a small portion of the movie where the second character appears only for thirty seconds on-screen in an important plot twist. Paropakari was the first film to be released at Nataraj theatre, Bangalore.

== Plot ==
Mohan, played by Dr Rajkumar, leaves his father's home after betting that he would return home after one year, after earning Rs 25,000 by legal means. He meets Shami, played by Jayanti, a runaway orphan, on the way. The two start living together, but face several hurdles like Mohan being accused of a murder. He earns the money, only to decide to spend it on the cancer treatment of his teacher. Mohan survives an attempt on his life by his cousin. Mohan returns to his father, along with Shami in the end.

== Cast ==
- Rajkumar as Mohan / Ramanna
- Jayanthi as Shami
- Rathna
- Sampath as Veeranna, Mohan's father
- H. R. Shastry
- Pandari Bai as Mohan's mother
- Ganapathi Bhat
- Papamma as Ramanna's mother
- Vijayalalitha
- Nagappa as Jayanna
- G. V. Swarnamma
- Comedian Guggu
- Tiger Prabhakar
- Sundarashree

== Soundtrack ==
The music of the film was composed by Upendra Kumar and lyrics for the soundtrack written by Chi. Udaya Shankar and R. N. Jayagopal. All the songs were received very well and the cabaret track "Jokey Naanu Balliya Minchu" sung by L. R. Eswari created a rage and became a chartbuster. That song was remixed in films like Nan Hendthi Maduve (2003) and Kalla Malla Sulla (2011). The song was also recreated by Ravi Basrur in KGF: Chapter 1.

Title	Singer(s)
"Kannu Reppe Ondanondu Marevude"	P. B. Sreenivas, S. Janaki
"Ice cream Beke"	P. B. Sreenivas
"Guttondu Heluve"	P. B. Sreenivas
"Jokey Naanu Balliya Minchu"	L. R. Eswari
"Hodare Hogu Nanagenu"	P. B. Sreenivas, S. Janaki

== Legacy ==
The core concept of the hero being taunted for spending his father's earnings and challenged to earn a decided sum of money at the end of a fixed period on his own without revealing his family background, leading to the hero leaving his bungalow wearing a suit, went on to be seen in future movies like Arasu (2007).
