= Baboo Band Baaja =

- Movie Poster
- Directed by: Rajesh Pinjani
- Written by: Rajesh Pinjani
- Produced by: Nita Jadhav
- Starring: Milind Shinde; Mitalee Jagtap Varadkar; Vivek Chabukswar
- Distributed by: Dar movies
- Release date: 13 April 2012
- Country: India
- Language: Marathi
- Budget: ₹0.75 crore (US$78,000)
- Box office: ₹2.10 crore (US$220,000)

Baboo Band Baaja is a Marathi film directed by debutante Rajesh Pinjani and produced by Nita Jadhav. The film tells the riveting tale of a father reluctant to educate his son, a mother who fiercely believes in its liberatory value, and the son who is caught in the crossfire. It stars Milind Shinde, Mitalee Jagtap Varadkar and Vivek Chabukswar in the lead roles. The film received three National Film Awards, including for Best Actress (Mitalee Jagtap Varadkar) and Best Debut Film of a Director, National Film Award for Best Child Artist and six Maharashtra State Film Awards.

== Cast ==
- Milind Shinde
- Mitalee Jagtap Varadkar
- Vivek Chabukswar
- Sanjay Kulkarni
- Namrata Awate

== Production ==
Rajesh Pinjani was inspired by the various films shown at Pune International Film Festival (PIFF) and decided to make one of his own. Pinjani says, "I was inspired by the various films shown at PIFF and decided to make one of my own. A friend suggested that I should make a film on brass bands. I was looking for a director for six months, but eventually decided to direct the film myself. The film, because of its extensive research, took almost one and a half years to complete. Pinjani says, "I stayed in Kamthi near Nagpur for a while to study the lives of bandwallahs. My elder brother helped me with newspaper cuttings on the subject."

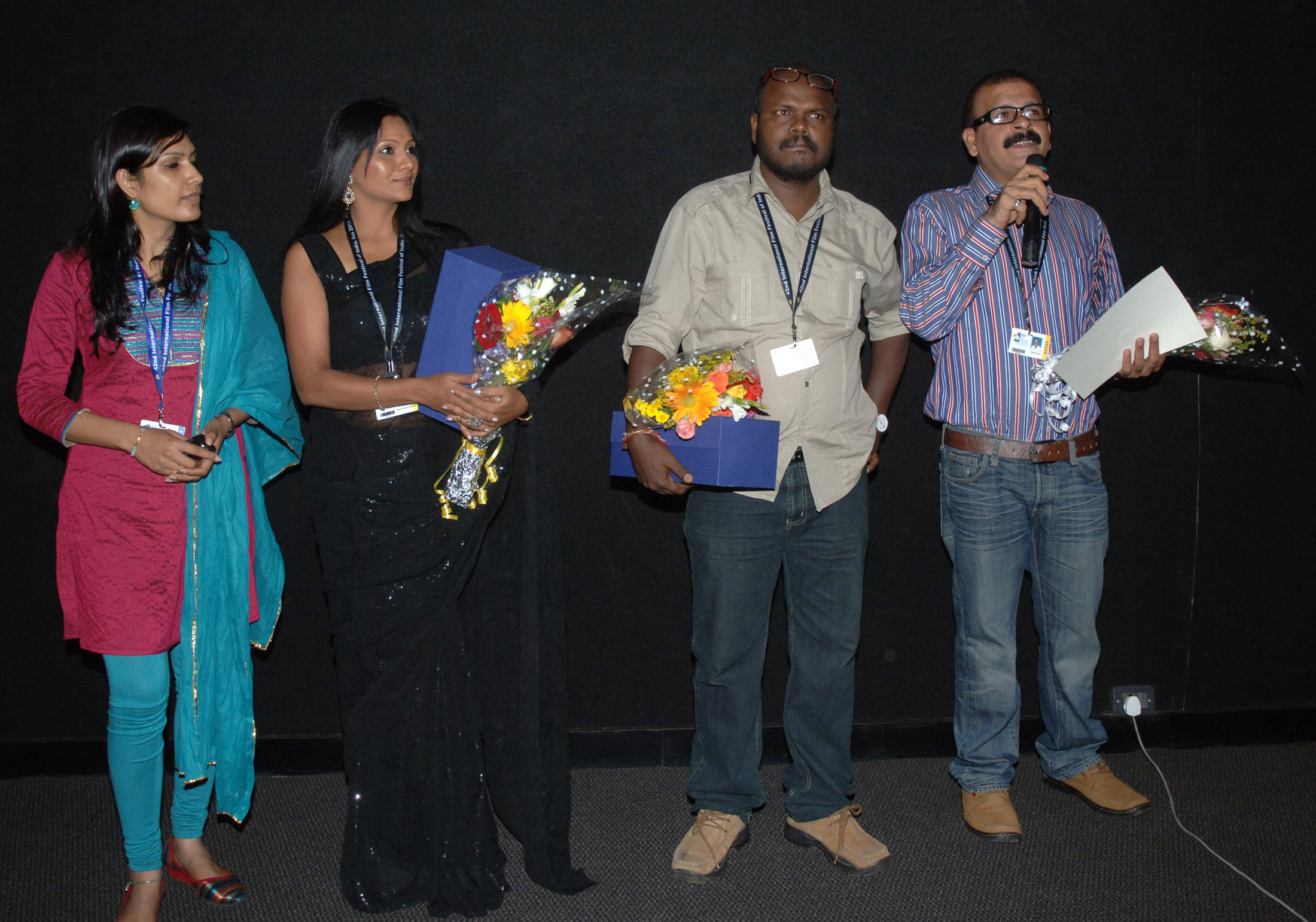
Film crew at IFFI (2011)

== Awards ==
National Film Awards

- Best Actress - Mitalee Jagtap Varadkar
- Indira Gandhi Award for Best Debut Film of a Director - Rajesh Pinjani and Nita Jadhav
- Best Child Artist - Vivek Chabukswar

Pune International Film Festival (PIFF)

- Sant Tukaram Best Marathi Feature Film Award - Rajesh Pinjani and Nita Jadhav
