= Harikumar Madhavan Nair =

Film sound designer

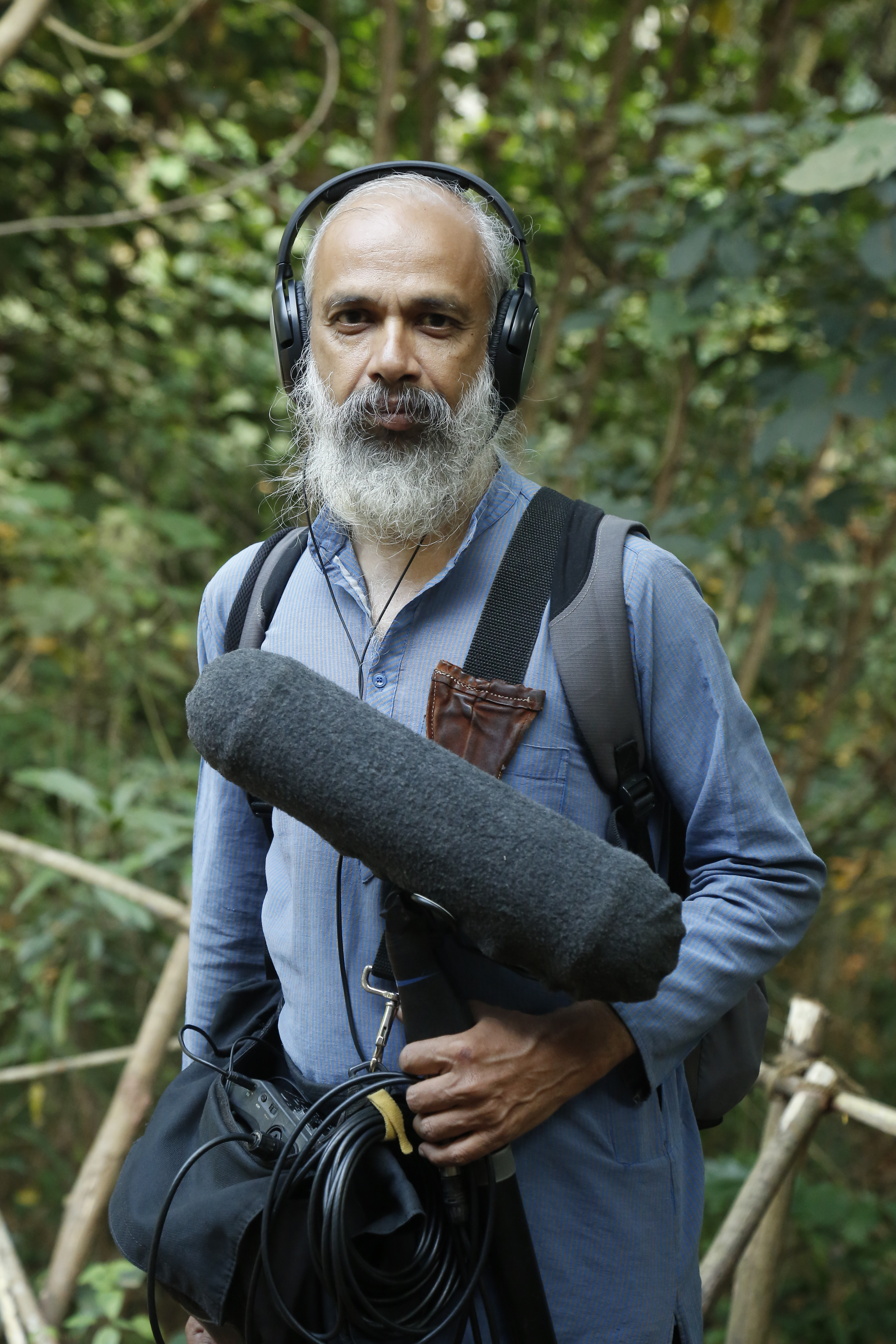
- Education: Film and Television Institute of India
- Occupations: Film sound design Audiographer and Sound Designer
- Years active: 1993 – present
- Spouse: Sandhya nair
- Children: Abhiram H
- Parents: Madhavan Nair (father); Madhavi Amma (mother)

Harikumar Madhavan Nair is an Indian film audiographer and sound designer. He works in Hindi and Malayalam cinema. He has worked on numerous documentary films and has won 3 National Film Award for Best Non-Feature Film Audiography.

== Style ==
Hari prefers to use a distant microphone instead of a lapel microphone. He claims it offers a correct perspective relative to the visual image.

== Partial filmography ==
Year	Film / Documentary	Language	Notes
2019	Nani	Malayalam	Kerala State Film Award for Best Sync Sound
2019	Netaji	Irula	
2016	Ka Bodyscapes		
2015	Call from the Other Shore (Documentary)		
2013	One Cube in Numerals (Documentary)		
2013	Kanyaka Talkies	Malayalam	Kerala State Award for Best Location Sound Recordist
2012	A Memory of the sea (Documentary)		National Film Award for Best Non-Feature Film Audiography
2011	Sengadal	Tamil	
2011	Gattu	Hindi	
2011	A Pestering Journey (Documentary)	English	National Film Award for Best Non-Feature Film Audiography
2009	Loudspeaker	Malayalam	
2009	Do Din Ka Mela (Documentary)		National Film Award for Best Non-Feature Film Audiography
2008	Manjadikuru		
2018	Unni (2007 film)	Malayalam	
2006	Valley of Flowers	Hindi / Japanese	
2003	Arimpara	Malayalam	
2001	Samsara	Tibetan	
2000	Choo Lenge Akash	Hindi cinema	
