= Children of the Pyre =

2008 documentary film

- Directed by: Rajesh S. Jala
- Produced by: Rajesh S. Jala
- Cinematography: Rajesh S. Jala
- Release date: 2008
- Running time: 74 minutes
- Country: India
- Language: Hindi
- Budget: US$250,000

Children of the Pyre (Ta paidia tis pyras) is a 2008 film documentary directed and produced by Rajesh S. Jala. The film documents the experiences of seven children who cremate dead bodies and steal cremation shrouds at India's largest crematorium, Manikarnika Ghat, on the banks of the Ganges.

Jala, also the cinematographer, shot over 100 hours of footage at the crematorium and surrounding sites, including candid interviews with the seven children described in the film, who discuss their difficult life cremating dead bodies and stealing shrouds from the bodies brought to the crematorium and reselling them to merchants for a nominal fee. In 2009, the filmmaker launched a project to improve the lives of the 300 children working at the crematorium.

The film was awarded "Best Documentary" at the 2008 Montréal World Film Festival, 2008 São Paulo International Film Festival, 2009 Indian Film Festival of Los Angeles, 2009 Asiatica Film Mediale, screened at 2008 IDFA, and the "Silver Lotus Award" for "Best Audiography" at the 56th National Film Awards.
