= Nirad Mohapatra =

Indian film director (1947–2015)

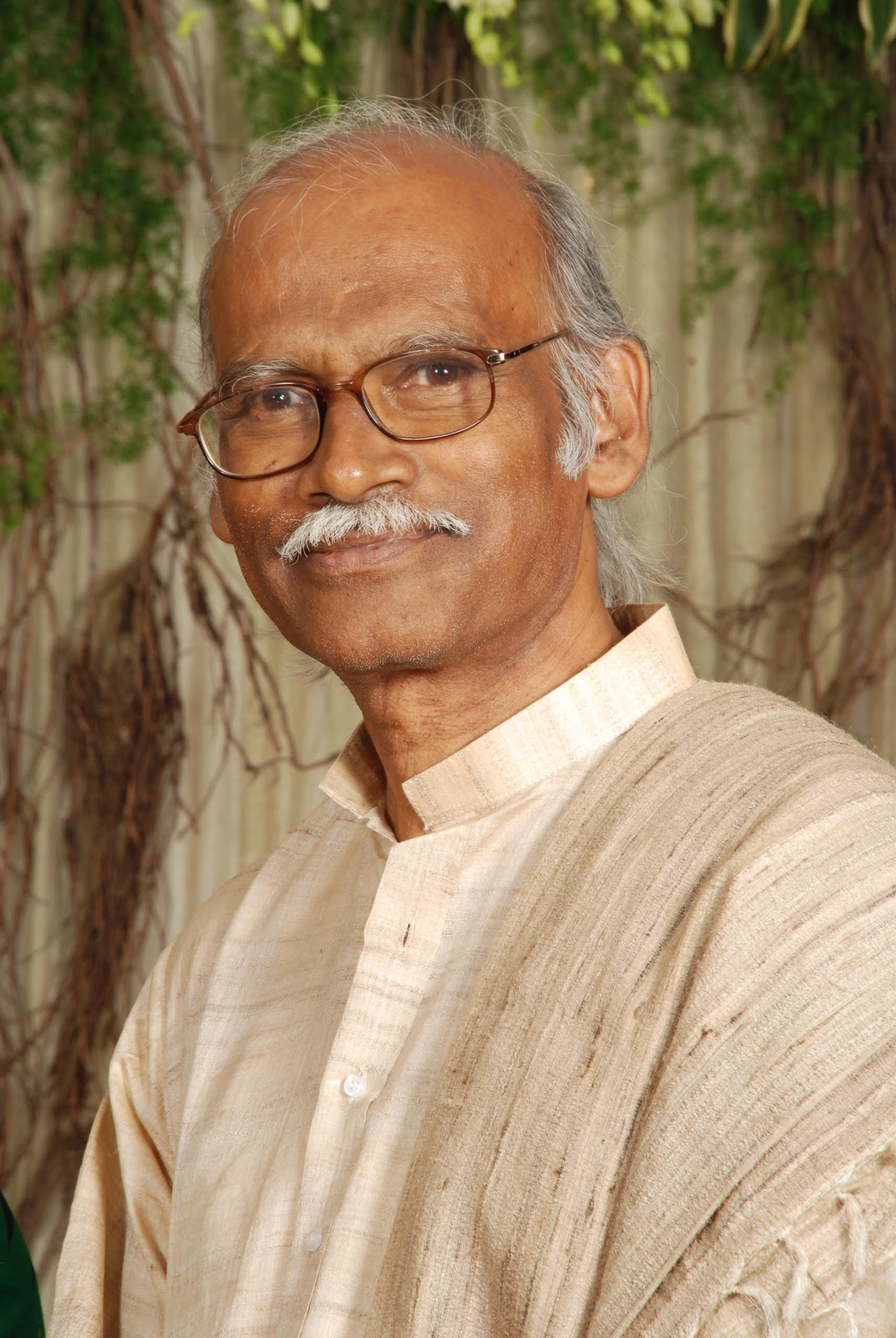
- Born: Nirad Narayan Mohapatra; 12 November 1947; Bhadrak, India
- Died: 19 February 2015 (aged 67); Mumbai, India
- Occupations: Film director, writer
- Spouse: Sabita Mohanty
- Website: niradmohapatra.com

Nirad Narayan Mohapatra (12 November 1947 – 19 February 2015) was an Indian film director. Mohapatra was born in the Indian state of Odisha. He directed the Oriya language film Maya Miriga, television soap operas and documentaries.

== Early life ==
Mohapatra was born on 12 November 1947, in Bhadrak. His father a journalist who was against British rule and entered politics after India obtained independence. His mother was a schoolteacher. Nirad was the eldest of 7 children. As a child he visited a cinema near his house in Bhadrak, Odisha. Nirad obtained a B.A degree with distinction in 1967', then enrolled for postgraduate studies in Political Science at Utkal University. He discontinued them in 1968 to start a diploma in film directing at the Film and Television Institute of India in Pune. He completed the diploma in 1971 and worked as a lecturer at the Institute from 1972.

== Career ==
In 1974, he founded Cinexstasy, a film society at Bhubaneswar, Odisha, screening classics of world cinema accompanied by analysis. He ran the society until 1983. He edited the film section of arts journal Mana Phasal, continued to lecture at FTII, wrote for national journals, made documentary films and taught a film appreciation course at Utkal University.

He married Sabita Mohanty in 1978, who, although the marriage was arranged, had attended the film appreciation course and Cinexstasy.

In 1984, Nirad made Maya Miriga, his first feature film, produced on a shoestring budget. It was shot in Puri, a beach-side town in Odisha. The film dealt with family issues, aspirations and break-up. It placed second in that year's Indian Panorama awards for Best National Film and was adjudged the Best Third World Film at International Film Festival Mannheim-Heidelberg, Germany. It received a special jury award at Hawaii International Film Festival, US. It was selected for the 'Critics Week' of Cannes Film Festival (France), BFI London Film Festival, Locarno Film Festival, Los Angeles Film Festival and other International Film Festivals. In 1985, he was invited to visit four US universities to lecture on film.

Mohapatra specialised in documentaries. He was a member of the national film jury and member selection panel for Indian Panorama and a jury member for the 5th International Children's Film Festival, Bhubaneswar. He sat on the governing council of the Film and TV Institute, Pune. He was a member of the NFDC script committee for Odisha. He was twice member of the Academic Council, Satyajit Ray Film and Television Institute, Kolkata. He was the chairman of the Academic Council of the Biju Patnaik Film and Television Institute, Cuttack, Odisha, and member of the Governing Council, SIET, Bhubaneswar. He was a guest lecturer at the Film School of KIIT University, Bhubaneswar.

He died of cardiac arrest on 19 February 2015.

== Filmography ==
Year	Movie	Work
1971	Sunmica	Diploma film
1974	Dhauligiri Shanti Stupa	(Cultural documentary, 35mm, B&W, English). Worked as Director, purchased by Films Division, Mumbai. 3 programmes for SITE, Cuttack Base Production Centre as outside producer.
1976	The Story of Cement	(Industrial documentary, 16mm, Colour, English).
1983	Maya Miriga	(Feature, 110 minutes, Colour, Oriya) Worked as Director Screened at Cannes, London, and Los Angeles Film Festival. Best Third World Film (Mannhein, Germany). Special Jury Commendation Award (Hawaii, U.S). Second Best National Feature Film 1984. Best Director, Orissa State Award 1985.
1985	Chhau Dance of Mayurbhanja	(Cultural documentary, 35mm, Colour, English). Worked as Producer & Director for Films Division, Mumbai.
1986	Pata Painting	(Cultural documentary, 16mm, Colour, English). Worked as producer & Director for Films Division, Mumbai.
1988	Tamasa Tire	(Tele-film, 16mm, Colour, Oriya). As Producer for Doordarshan, Cuttack.
1989	The Vanishing Frontier	(Ecological documentary, 16mm, Colour, English). As Producer and Director for INTACH, New Delhi.
1990	A New Horizon	(Documentary on polio, 16mm, Colour, Hindi & English). As Producer and Director for NIRTAR, Olatpur.
1991	Ama Katha, Ama Kahani	(A ten part educational video serial). As Producer only for The National Literary Mission, New Delhi
1992	Aparajita	(Women empowerment documentary, 16mm, Colour, Oriya). As Producer and Director for UNICEF.
1994	Ama Gaan Halchal	(Eight-part educational video serial). As producer only for The National Literacy Mission, New Delhi.
1995	Konark - The Black Pagoda	(Documentary in 16mm, Colour, English) As producer & Director for The Archaeological Survey of India.
1995	Maestros of Odissi	(Cultural documentary in 35mm, Colour, Sanskrit) As producer & Director for Odissi Research Center through I&PR department.
1996	A Ray of Hope	(Documentary, video, English). As Producer and Director for the Ministry of Rural Areas and Employment, New Delhi.
1997	Bahaghar	(13 episode serial in video). As a producer only for Doordarshan, Bhubaneswar.
1997	Patriotic Songs, Literature and Mass Media	(6 episodes in video). Specially commissioned for celebration of 50 years of Independence by Doordarshan, Bhubaneswar.
1999	Joyful Learning	(Educational documentary in video). As Producer and Director for D.P.E.P, Government of Orissa.
2001	Chilika – A Fragile Eco-System	(Ecological documentary in Beta, English). As producer and Director for P.S.B.T in collaboration with Doordarshan, New Delhi.
2002	T.B. – A Curable Killer	(Documentary on health in Beta, English) As producer and director for DANTB, Orissa
2003	Kana Mamu	Six episode Doordarshan serial. Written by Kanta Kabi Laxmikanta Mohapatra.
2003	Tadpa	One episode Doordarshan serial. Written by Dr. Gopinath Mohanty.
2005	Jashoda	A 3-part serial on child adoption produced by Gramsat, Govt of Orissa.
2009	Ahilya ra Bahaghara	
2009	Luchakali	
2009	Odisha Oil Company	
2009	Kamadhenu Gokhadya	
2009	Sapana ra Saudagara	
