= Chow Chow Bath =

- Teaser release poster
- Directed by: Kenja Chethan Kumar
- Written by: Kenja Chethan Kumar
- Starring: Aruna Balraj; Sagar Gowda; Sushmitha Bhat; Dhanush S Baikampady; Sankalp Sharma; Prakarsha Shastry; Geetha Bangera
- Cinematography: Rudramuni Belagere
- Edited by: Kenja Chethan Kumar
- Music by: Hemanth Jois
- Production company: Horizzon Movies Kamadhenu Films Sanatanay Pictures
- Release date: 15 March 2024
- Running time: 110 minutes
- Country: India
- Language: Kannada

Chow Chow Bath is a 2024 Indian Kannada-language hyperlink romantic comedy film written and directed by Kenja Chethan Kumar.

== Cast ==
- Aruna Balraj as Sunitha
- Sagar Gowda as Shashank
- Sushmitha Bhat as Sandhya
- Dhanush S Baikampady as Sachin
- Sankalp Sharma as Sathya
- Prakarsha Shastry as Saanvi
- Geetha Bangera as Sneha

== Reception ==
A Sharadhaa of Cinema Express said that “Imagine love as a plate of Chow Chow Bath, where each spoonful offers a different taste.” Harish Basavarajaiah of The Times of India said that “Director Kenja Chethan Kumar has made an honest attempt in blending comedy, romance and sentiment perfectly.”

== Accolades ==
Award	Year	Category	Recipient	Result	Ref.
Bengaluru International Film Festival (BIFFES)	2024	Kannada Cinema Competition	Kenja Chethan Kumar	Nominated	
