= Ranjini Krishnan =

Indian screenwriter, academic and entrepreneur

Ranjini Krishnan (born Mozhikulam, Ernakulam, Kerala) is an Indian screenwriter, academic and entrepreneur. She works on gender and intimacy issues in Kerala through her work and articles. She is a part of sustainable wellness ventures based in Kerala.

== Early life and education ==
She grew up in Moozhikulam, Ernakulam. She earned an MA in psychology and completed a doctorate in Cultural Studies at the Centre for the Study of Culture and Society in Bangalore.

== Films ==
Ranjini is the producer and scriptwriter of the national award-winning documentary A Pestering Journey (2010), and co-scriptwriter of the feature film Kanyaka Talkies (2013), which won Best Screenplay at the New York Indian Film Festival. Her video art project Daughters of Scheherazade (2020), supported by the India Foundation for the Arts, explores the cultural meanings of the nuptial chamber and female experience of intimacy and violence through interviews, poems, and visual installations.

== Entrepreneurship ==
Ranjini is the founder and managing director of Body Tree Naturals Pvt. Ltd., a company that produces organic bath products. The brand is noted for its handmade soaps and skincare products that follows sustainable practices in their production. She also directs Sradha Culture Lab (OPC) Pvt. Ltd., which focuses on menstrual awareness and research.

== Selected works ==
- A Pestering Journey (2010) – Producer, Scriptwriter
- Kanyaka Talkies (2013) – Scriptwriter
- Daughters of Scheherazade (2019) – Director, Writer, Filmmaker
- Puthu Katha (2004) – Contributor (Malayalam short story anthology)
