= Rajesh S. Jala =

Indian documentary filmmaker

- Occupation: Filmmaker
- Known for: Documentary filmmaking.

Rajesh S. Jala is a documentary filmmaker born in Kashmir in the 1970s who has been making films since his first short work with Tassaduq Hussain in 1996.

As a result of the film Children of the Pyre, Plan International has launched Project Baghiratthi to work to improve the lives of the 300 children working at the crematorium featured in his film, and Jala has worked with donors to send the seven children featured in this film to school.

== Awards for Children of the Pyre ==
- Best Documentary, Montreal Film Festival 2008
- Best Documentary, Sao Paola International Film Festival 2008
- IFFLA 2009
- Asiatica Film Mediale 2009
- Best Documentary and Cinematography, IDPA 2009
- Special Jury Award, JEEVIKA Film Festival 2009
- Special Jury Award and Best Audiography, National Film Awards India 2008

== Filmography ==
- 2013 23 winters: a short drama about a refugee from Kashmir.
- 2011 At the Stairs: a film documenting widows who move to Varanasi.
- 2009 Beyond Tradition: a film about contemporary and traditional dance practices of India.
- 2008 Children of the Pyre: a film documenting the stories of seven children working as "Shroud Sellers" at a crematorium.
- 2008 Cradle by the Stream: a film about the city of Banaras.
- 2006 Floating Lamp of the Shadow Valley: the story of a nine-year-old boy in Kashmir whose father leaves him and his family for a Jihad.
- 2007 Footsteps of Nikitin: a film about 15th century trader Afanasy Nikitin.
