= 59th National Film Awards =

2012 Indian film award

- 59th National Film Awards event logo
- Awarded for: Best of Indian cinema in 2011
- Awarded by: Directorate of Film Festivals
- Presented by: Mohammad Hamid Ansari (Vice-President of India)
- Announced on: 7 March 2012
- Presented on: 3 May 2012
- Site: Vigyan Bhavan, New Delhi
- Hosted by: Vinay Pathak and Saumya Tandon
- Official website: dff.nic.in

Highlights
- Best Feature Film: Deool; Byari
- Best Non-Feature Film: And We Play On
- Best Book: R. D. Burman: The Man The Music
- Best Film Critic: Manoj Barpujari
- Dadasaheb Phalke Award: Soumitra Chatterjee
- Most awards: • Anhe Ghore Da Daan • Balgandharva • Chillar Party • Deool • Ranjana Ami Ar Ashbona • The Dirty Picture (3)

The 59th National Film Awards, presented by the Directorate of Film Festivals, honoured the best of Indian cinema for 2011 and took place on 3 May 2012 at Vigyan Bhavan, New Delhi. Awards were presented in 38 categories in the Feature Films section, 20 categories in the Non-Feature Films section and two categories for the Best Writing on Cinema section; 41 jury members chose the winners from 392 entries. The ceremony was hosted by actors Vinay Pathak and Saumya Tandon. Awards were presented by the Vice-President of India, Mohammad Hamid Ansari. The ceremony was broadcast live on three television channels, eleven All India Radio stations, and webcast live.

Deool, a Marathi film, and Byari, the first and only Beary film, shared the award for the Best Feature Film. The award for the Best Non-Feature Film was given to the Hindi-English documentary And We Play On. The book, R. D. Burman: The Man, The Music, co-authored by Anirudha Bhattacharjee and Balaji Vittal, won the Best Book on Cinema; Assamese film critic Manoj Barpujari was declared the Best Film Critic. Gurvinder Singh won the best feature film direction award for his directorial debut, Anhe Ghore Da Daan. For the film Deool, Girish Kulkarni won the awards for Best Actor and Best Dialogue; Bollywood actress Vidya Balan won the Best Actress award for The Dirty Picture. The Dadasaheb Phalke Award, regarded as the most prestigious recognition in Indian cinema, was given to the veteran Bengali actor Soumitra Chatterjee for his contribution to Bengali cinema.

== Selection process ==
The Directorate of Film Festivals invited nominations for the 2012 award ceremony on 26 December 2011. Feature and Non-Feature Films certified by the Central Board of Film Certification between 1 January 2011, and 31 December 2011, were eligible for the film award categories. The written material on Indian cinema published in Indian print media during the same period were eligible for the best writing on cinema section. The dubbed, revised or copied versions of a film or translation, abridgements, edited or annotated works and reprints were ineligible for the awards. The deadline for submissions was 17 January 2012.

The Feature Film category received 186 entries in 19 languages, marking the highest number of submissions in the history of the National Film Awards, as of 2011. A total of 156 entries were received in the Non-Feature Films category along with 28 books and 22 articles which were submitted for the Best Writing in Cinema.

== Awards ==
The National Film Awards are grouped into three sections: Feature Films, Non-Feature Films and Writing on Cinema. On 7 March 2012, in a press conference held at Shastri Bhavan, New Delhi, the winners for the 2012 award ceremony were announced. A lifetime achievement award, named after Dadasaheb Phalke, was awarded to a film personality for an outstanding contribution to the Indian Cinema. The winners were awarded a medallion, a cash prize and a certificate of merit.

== Dadasaheb Phalke Award ==
Introduced in 1969, the Dadasaheb Phalke Award is the highest award given to recognise the contributions of film personalities towards the development of Indian cinema and for distinguished contributions to the medium, its growth and promotion. A committee consisting of five personalities from the Indian film industry was appointed to evaluate the Dadasaheb Phalke award nominations for 2011. Following were the jury members:

• Shyam Benegal
• Girish Kasaravalli
• Saeed Akhtar Mirza
• Ramesh Sippy
• V. K. Murthy

The Dadasaheb Phalke award for 2011 was announced on 23 March 2012. Actor Soumitra Chatterjee won the award for his contribution to Indian cinema, predominantly in Bengali cinema. Chatterjee was a regular in Satyajit Ray films, and worked with other notable directors such as Mrinal Sen and Tapan Sinha in a career lasting over 50 years.

Name of Award	Image	Awardee(s)	Awarded As	Awards
Dadasaheb Phalke Award		Soumitra Chatterjee	Actor	Swarna Kamal, ₹1 million (US$10,000) and a Shawl

== Feature films ==
Feature films were awarded at national and regional levels. A Marathi film, Deool and a Beary film, Byari, shared the National Film Award for Best Feature Film. Deool became the third Marathi film to win the honour after Shyamchi Aai (1953) and Shwaas (2003). The film's author and lead actor, Girish Kulkarni, won the awards for Best Actor and Best Dialogues. Byari is the first feature film ever made in the Beary language. In this section, 24 films won awards, and six films, including Deool, the Punjabi film Anhe Ghore Da Daan, another Marathi film Balgandharva, a Bengali film Ranjana Ami Ar Ashbona and two Hindi films Chillar Party and The Dirty Picture, won three awards each.

=== Jury ===
For the Feature Film section, six committees were formed based on the different geographic regions in India. The two-tier evaluation process included a central committee and five regional committees. The central committee, headed by the actor Rohini Hattangadi, included the heads of each regional committee and five other jury members. At regional level, each committee consisted of one chief and four members. The chief and one non-chief member of each regional committee were selected from outside that geographic region. The table below names the jury members for the central and regional committees:

Central Jury

• Rohini Hattangadi (Chairperson) (Actress)
• K. Hariharan (Filmmaker)	• K. P. Kumaran (Filmmaker)
• Vinay Shukla (Filmmaker)	• Aloknanda Roy (Actress)
• A. S. Kanal (Filmmaker, cinematographer and editor)	• Latika Padgaonkar (Writer)
• Prakash Belawadi (Director and journalist)	• Hiren Bora (Actor)
• Kishwar Desai (Author)	• Ranjani Mazumdar (Author)

Northern Region: (Bhojpuri, Dogri, English, Hindi, Punjabi, Rajasthani, Urdu)

• K. Hariharan (Head)
• Amrik Gill (Writer)	• Ayesha Sayani (Ad filmmaker)
• K. Bikram Singh (Filmmaker)	• Shyamal Karmakar (Director and editor)

Eastern Region: (Assamese, Bengali, Oriya and North-Eastern dialects)

• K. P. Kumaran (Head)
• Satarupa Sanyal (Filmmaker, actress and poet)	• Dilip Patnaik (Filmmaker)
• Bhagirathi (Actress)	• Ganesh Matkari (Film critic)

Western Region: (Gujarati, Konkani, Marathi)

• Vinay Shukla (Head)
• Pandhari Juker (Makeup Artist)	• Kanchan Nayak (Director)
• Hemendra Chaya (Actor)	• Banwari Taneja (Actor)

Southern Region I: (Malayalam, Tamil)

• Aloknanda Roy (Head)
• Sashi Paravoor (Director)	• T. G. Thyagarajan (Producer)
• S. P. Jananathan (Director)	• Bela Negi (Filmmaker and editor)

Southern Region II: (Kannada, Telugu)

• A. S. Kanal (Head)
• Umashanker Swamy (Filmmaker)	• P. H. Vishwanath (Filmmaker)
• K. Satyanarayana (Filmmaker)	• Ratnottama Sengupta (Film critic)

=== All India Awards ===
At the national level, feature films competed in 29 categories. The Swarna Kamal (Golden Lotus Award) was awarded in five categories, the Rajat Kamal (Silver Lotus Award) in the rest. In this edition, the Golden Lotus Award for the Best Animation Film and eight Silver Lotus Awards were not announced. The awards given were as follows:

==== Golden Lotus Award ====
All the winners were awarded with a Swarna Kamal (Golden Lotus Award), a certificate and a cash prize.

Name of Award	Name of Film(s)	Language	Awardee(s)	Cash prize
Best Feature Film	Deool	Marathi	Producer: Abhijit Gholap; Director: Umesh Vinayak Kulkarni	₹250,000 (US$2,600)
Best Feature Film	Byari	Beary	Producer: T. H. Althaf Hussain; Director: Suveeran	₹250,000 (US$2,600)
Best Debut Film of a Director	Aaranya Kaandam	Tamil	Producer: S. P. B. Charan; Director: Thiagarajan Kumararaja	₹125,000 (US$1,300)
Best Popular Film Providing Wholesome Entertainment	Azhagarsamiyin Kuthirai	Tamil	Producer: P. Madhan; Director: Suseenthiran	₹200,000 (US$2,100)
Best Children's Film	Chillar Party	Hindi	Producer: UTV Software Communications, Salman Khan; Director: Vikas Bahl and Nitesh Tiwari	₹150,000 (US$1,600)
Best Direction	Anhe Ghore Da Daan	Punjabi	Gurvinder Singh	₹250,000 (US$2,600)

==== Silver Lotus Award ====
All the winners were awarded with a Rajat Kamal (Silver Lotus Award), a certificate and a cash prize.

Name of Award	Name of Film(s)	Language(s)	Awardee(s)	Cash prize
Best Actor	Deool	Marathi	Girish Kulkarni	₹50,000 (US$520)
Best Actress	The Dirty Picture	Hindi	Vidya Balan	₹50,000 (US$520)
Best Supporting Actor	Azhagarsamiyin Kuthirai	Tamil	Appukutty	₹50,000 (US$520)
Best Supporting Actress	Phijigee Mani	Manipuri	Leishangthem Tonthoingambi Devi	₹50,000 (US$520)
Best Child Artist	Stanley Ka Dabba	Hindi	Partho Gupte	₹50,000 (US$520)
Best Child Artist	Chillar Party	Hindi	• Irrfan Khan • Sanath Menon • Rohan Grover • Naman Jain • Aarav Khanna • Vishesh Tiwari • Chinmai Chandranshuh • Vedant Desai • Divij Handa • Shriya Sharma	₹50,000 (US$520)
Best Male Playback Singer	Balgandharva	Marathi	Anand Bhate	₹50,000 (US$520)
Best Female Playback Singer	Abosheshey ("Dure Kothao Dure Dure" and "Aaji Bijan Ghare")	Bengali	Roopa Ganguly	₹50,000 (US$520)
Best Cinematography	Anhe Ghore Da Daan	Punjabi	Cameraman: Satya Rai Nagpaul; Laboratory Processing: Reliance MediaWorks	₹50,000 (US$520)
Best Screenplay • Screenplay Writer (Original)	Chillar Party	Hindi	• Vikas Bahl • Nitesh Tiwari • Vijay Maurya	₹50,000 (US$520)
Best Screenplay • Screenplay Writer (Adapted)	Shala	Marathi	Avinash Deshpande Nigdi	₹50,000 (US$520)
Best Screenplay • Dialogues	Deool	Marathi	Girish Kulkarni	₹50,000 (US$520)
Best Audiography • Location Sound Recordist	Zindagi Na Milegi Dobara	Hindi	Baylon Fonseca	₹50,000 (US$520)
Best Audiography • Sound Designer	Game	Hindi	Baylon Fonseca	₹50,000 (US$520)
Best Audiography • Re-recordist of the Final Mixed Track	Game	Hindi	Hitendra Ghosh	₹50,000 (US$520)
Best Editing	Aaranya Kaandam	Tamil	• Praveen K. L. • N. B. Srikanth	₹50,000 (US$520)
Best Art Direction	Noukadubi	Bengali	Indraneel Ghosh	₹50,000 (US$520)
Best Costume Design	Balgandharva	Marathi	Neeta Lulla	₹50,000 (US$520)
Best Costume Design	The Dirty Picture	Hindi	Niharika Khan	₹50,000 (US$520)
Best Make-up Artist	Balgandharva	Marathi	Vikram Gaikwad	₹50,000 (US$520)
Best Make-up Artist	The Dirty Picture	Hindi	Vikram Gaikwad	₹50,000 (US$520)
Best Music Direction • Songs	Ranjana Ami Ar Ashbona	Bengali	Neel Dutt	₹50,000 (US$520)
Best Music Direction • Background Score	Laptop	Bengali	Mayookh Bhaumik	₹50,000 (US$520)
Best Lyrics	I Am ("Agar Zindagi")	Hindi	Amitabh Bhattacharya	₹50,000 (US$520)
Best Special Effects	Ra.One	Hindi	• Harry Hingorani • Keitan Yadav (Red Chillies VFX)	₹50,000 (US$520)
Best Choreography	Zindagi Na Milegi Dobara ("Senorita")	Hindi	Bosco-Caesar	₹50,000 (US$520)
Special Jury Award	Ranjana Ami Ar Ashbona	Bengali	Anjan Dutt (Actor, Singer, Writer, Director)	₹200,000 (US$2,100)
Special Mention	Byari	Beary	Mallika (Actress)	Certificate only
Special Mention	Adimadhyantham	Malayalam	Sherrey (Director)	Certificate only

=== Regional Awards ===
National Film Awards are also given to the best films in the regional languages of India. Awards for the regional languages are categorised as per their mention in the Eighth schedule of the Constitution of India. Awardees included producers and directors of the film. No films in languages other than those specified in the Schedule VIII of the Constitution were eligible.

All the winners were awarded with Rajat Kamal (Silver Lotus Award), a certificate and cash prize. Following were the awards given:

Name of Award	Name of Film	Awardee(s)		Cash prize
Name of Award	Name of Film	Producer(s)	Director	Cash prize
Best Feature Film in Bengali	Ranjana Ami Ar Ashbona	Rana Sarkar	Anjan Dutt	₹100,000 (US$1,000)
Best Feature Film in Dogri	Dille Ch Vasya Koi	Sanjeev Rattan	Sanjeev Rattan	₹100,000 (US$1,000)
Best Feature Film in Hindi	I Am	• Onir • Sanjay Suri	Onir	₹100,000 (US$1,000)
Best Feature Film in Kannada	Koormavatara	Basant Kumar Patil	Girish Kasaravalli	₹100,000 (US$1,000)
Best Feature Film in Malayalam	Indian Rupee	August Cinema India Pvt. Ltd.	Ranjith	₹100,000 (US$1,000)
Best Feature Film in Manipuri	Phijigee Mani	• Takhelchangbam Ongbi Medha Sharmi	Oinam Gautam Singh	₹100,000 (US$1,000)
Best Feature Film in Marathi	Shala	• Vivek Wagh • Nilesh Navalkar	Sujay Dahake	₹100,000 (US$1,000)
Best Feature Film in Punjabi	Anhe Ghore Da Daan	NFDC	Gurvinder Singh	₹100,000 (US$1,000)
Best Feature Film in Tamil	Vaagai Sooda Vaa	S. Muruganandham	A. Sarkunam	₹100,000 (US$1,000)

== Non-Feature Films ==
In the Non-Feature Film section, 21 films won awards. Three films—Panchakki, There is Something in the Air and Tiger Dynasty—won three awards each. There is Something in the Air also won the award for best direction—one of the Golden Lotus awards for Non-Feature Films. Three Silver Lotus Awards from Non-Feature Films section were not awarded.

=== Jury ===
A committee of seven, headed by director Romesh Sharma, was appointed to evaluate the Non-Feature Films entries. The jury members were:

• Romesh Sharma (Chairperson) (Producer and director)
• Brahmanand Singh (Filmmaker and screen writer)	• Supriyo Sen (Director)
• Suresh Kohli (Journalist)	• Sameer Hanchate (Producer and director)
• Haobam Paban Kumar (Director)	• Gouri Patwardhan (Cinematographer)

=== Golden Lotus Award ===
All the winners were awarded with the Swarna Kamal (Golden Lotus Award), a certificate and cash prize.

Name of Award	Name of Film(s)	Language(s)	Awardee(s)	Cash prize
Best Non-Feature Film	And We Play On	• Hindi • English	Producer: Pramod Purswane; Director: Pramod Purswane	₹150,000 (US$1,600)
Best Non-Feature Film Direction	There is Something in the Air	• Hindi • Urdu • English	Iram Ghufran	₹150,000 (US$1,600)

=== Silver Lotus Award ===
All the winners were awarded with Rajat Kamal (Silver Lotus Award) and cash prize.

Name of Award	Name of Film(s)	Language(s)	Awardee(s)	Cash prize
Best First Non-Feature Film	The Silent Poet	Manipuri	Producer: Borun Thokchom; Director: Borun Thokchom	₹75,000 (US$780)
Best Anthropological / Ethnographic Film	Bom	• Hindi • English	Producer: Anirban Datta; Director: Amlan Datta	₹50,000 (US$520)
Best Biographical Film /Best Historical Reconstruction Film	Vishnupant Damle: Bolpatancha Mook Nayak	Marathi	Producer: Anil Anant Damle; Director: Virendra Valsangkar	₹50,000 (US$520)
Best Arts / Cultural Film	Fried Fish, Chicken Soup and a Premiere Show	• Manipuri • English	Producer: Madhusree Dutta; Director: Mamta Murthy	₹50,000 (US$520)
Best Arts / Cultural Film	Lasya Kavvya – The World of Alarmel Valli	English	Producer: Sankalp Meshram; Director: Sankalp Meshram	₹50,000 (US$520)
Best Environment / Conservation / Preservation Film	Tiger Dynasty	English	Producer: S. Nallamuthu; Director: S. Nallamuthu	₹50,000 (US$520)
Best Promotional Film	The Dream Fulfilled — Memories of the Engineering Challenges	English	Producer: Delhi Metro Rail Corporation; Director: Satish Pande	₹50,000 (US$520)
Best Film on Social Issues	Mindscapes... of Love and Longing	• Hindi • English	Producer: Public Service Broadcasting Trust; Director: Arun Chadha	₹50,000 (US$520)
Best Film on Social Issues	Inshallah, Football	• Kashmiri • Urdu • English	Producer: Javed Jaffrey; Director: Ashvin Kumar	₹50,000 (US$520)
Best Educational / Motivational / Instructional Film	A Drop of Sunshine	English	Producer: Public Service Broadcasting Trust; Director: Aparna Sanyal	₹50,000 (US$520)
Best Exploration / Adventure Film (Including sports)	The Finish Line	English	Producer: Syed Sultan Ahmed and Tabassum Modi; Director: Akshay Roy	₹50,000 (US$520)
Best Investigative Film	Cotton for My Shroud	English	Producer: Kavita Bahl; Director: Nandan Saxena and Kavita Bahl	₹50,000 (US$520)
Best Short Fiction Film	Panchakki	Hindi	Producer: Sanjeev Rattan; Director: Sanjeev Rattan	₹50,000 (US$520)
Best Film on Family Welfare	Red Building where the Sun Sets	English	Producer: Syed Sultan Ahmed and Tabassum Modi; Director: Revathi	₹50,000 (US$520)
Best Cinematography	Tiger Dynasty	English	Cameraman: S. Nallamuthu	₹50,000 (US$520)
Best Audiography	1, 2	Hindi	Gautam Nair	₹50,000 (US$520)
Best Editing	There is Something in the Air	• Hindi • Urdu • English	Iram Ghufran	₹50,000 (US$520)
Best Music Direction	Panchakki	Hindi	Dhrubajyoti Phukan	₹50,000 (US$520)
Best Narration / Voice Over	Just that Sort of a Day	English	Ann Abraham	₹50,000 (US$520)
Special Jury Award	Jai Bhim Comrade	Marathi	Anand Patwardhan (Director)	₹100,000 (US$1,000)
Special Mention	You Don't Belong	• Bengali • English	Spandan Banerjee (Director)	Certificate only
Special Mention	Airawat	• Marathi • Hindi	Renu Savant (Director)	Certificate only

== Best Writing on Cinema ==
The Best Writing on Cinema awards are intended to encourage the study and appreciation of cinema as an art form and the dissemination of information and critical appreciation of the medium through books, articles, reviews etc.

=== Jury ===
A committee of three headed by National Award-winning writer Vijaya Mulay was appointed to evaluate the nominations for the best writing on Indian cinema. The jury members were as follows:

• Vijaya Mulay (Chairperson) (Filmmaker and writer)
• J. M. Parakh (Writer)	• M. F. Thomas (Editor and writer)

=== Golden Lotus Award ===
Official Name: Swarna Kamal

All the winners were awarded with the Swarna Kamal (Golden Lotus Award), cash prize and a certificate.

Name of Award	Name of Book	Language	Awardee(s)	Cash prize
Best Book on Cinema	R. D. Burman: The Man The Music	English	Author: Anirudha Bhattacharjee and Balaji Vittal; Publisher:Harper Collins India	₹75,000 (US$780)

Name of Award	Language(s)	Awardee	Cash prize
Best Film Critic	• Assamese • English	Manoj Barpujari	₹75,000 (US$780)

== Awards not given ==
Across all sections, 12 out of 60 awards were not presented. Some were not awarded because no entries were submitted and for others, no suitable films were found. All the awards for the Best Writing on Cinema section were awarded. The following awards from the other two sections were not given:

Feature films

- Best Animated Film
- Best Film on Environment Conservation / Preservation
- Best Film on Family Welfare
- Best Film on National Integration
- Best Film on Other Social Issues
- Best Feature Film in Assamese
- Best Feature Film in English
- Best Feature Film in Oriya
- Best Feature Film in Telugu

Non-Feature Films

- Best Animation Film
- Best Agricultural Film
- Best Scientific Film

== Award ceremony ==
The awards presentation ceremony took place on 3 May 2012, at Vigyan Bhavan, New Delhi. The ceremony was presided over by the Vice-President of India, Mohammad Hamid Ansari. Other dignitaries present were Ambika Soni (Minister of Information and Broadcasting), Vinod Lamba (President of the Film Federation of India), Dharmesh Tiwari (President of the Federation of Western India Cine Employees), and two Ministers of State for Information and Broadcasting, C. M. Jatua and R. Jagathrakshkan. The chairpersons of the jury for the three awards sections were also present. The show was hosted by Hindi film actor Vinay Pathak and Hindi television actress, Saumya Tandon. It was broadcast live on the television channels Doordarshan 1, DD India and DD News; on eleven All India Radio stations; and on the official websites of the Directorate of Film Festivals and the Ministry of Information and Broadcasting. The public screenings of the award-winning films were scheduled from 1 June 2012, to 10 June 2012, at Siri Fort Auditorium II, New Delhi.

To mark the centenary of Indian cinema, the ceremony started with clips of the first full-length Indian feature film, Raja Harishchandra (1913). Directed by Dadasaheb Phalke, this silent film was released on 3 May 1913 at Coronation Cinema, Mumbai. To honour this historic event, Soni announced that 2013 would be observed as the centenary year of Indian Cinema and that the National Film Awards ceremony would be held on 3 May every year. She also announced that a National Heritage Mission would be set up to digitise and restore all audio and video tapes of Indian films. A Museum of Indian Cinema would also be inaugurated at the Gulshan Mahal, Mumbai, before May 2013.

Rajiv Mehrotra of the Public Service Broadcasting Trust won his twentieth National Film Award. The acclaimed Kannada director Girish Kasaravalli received his 13th National Film Award when his film Koormavatara won the Best Feature Film in Kannada award. The dress designer Neeta Lulla won her fourth award for the costumes in Balgandharva. Also, eleven child artists were given Best Child Artist Awards for their performances.

Three award-winners—Anand Bhate, Roopa Ganguly and Amitabh Bhattacharya, who won the award for Best Male Playback Singer, Best Female Playback Singer and Best Lyrics respectively—performed live during the ceremony. Both the singers performed their award-winning songs—Bhate sang "Chinmaya Sakal Hridaya" from the Marathi film Balgandharva and Ganguly performed "Dure Kothao Dure Dure" from her film Abosheshey. Bhattacharya was accompanied by singer-songwriter Amit Trivedi for the song "Agar Zindagi" from I Am.

== Controversy ==
After the awards were announced on 7 March 2012, Enajori.com, a society which promotes the cultural heritage of Assam, filed a petition against the jury's decision for not considering Ekhon Nedekha Nodir Xhipare an Assamese film and rejecting its nomination. In response to the plea, the Delhi High Court issued a notice to the Ministry of Information and Broadcasting, the Directorate of Film Festivals, the Central Board of Film Certification, Rohini Hattangadi—chairperson of Feature Film section, and Hiren Bora—a jury member for the Feature Film section. After examining the documents submitted for the selection of regional films, the High Court dismissed the plea. The proceedings revealed Ekhon Nedekha Nodir Xhipare, and other films from the eastern region, were previewed and rejected by the jury. The court imposed costs of ₹2,000 (US$21) on the petitioner for moving the court without ascertaining the facts of the case.
