= Sheetal =

- Pronunciation: [ʃiː.t̪ɐl], SHEE-tuhl
- Gender: Both
- Language: Hindi; Sanskrit

Origin
- Meaning: "cool"
- Region of origin: India

Other names
- Alternative spelling: Shital

Sheetal (Hindi : शीतल) is a Hindi given name, which means "cool, cold". It is also romanized as Shital.

== Notable people named Sheetal ==
- Sheetal Agashe (born 1997), Indian businesswoman
- Sheetal Amte (1981–2020), Indian public health expert, disability specialist and social entrepreneur
- Sheetal Angural, Indian politician
- Sheetal Devi (born 2007), Indian para-archer
- Sheetal Mallar (born 1974), Indian model
- Sheetal Maulik, Indian TV actress
- Sheetal Menon (born 1985), Indian actress and model
- Sheetal Pandey (born 1947), Indian politician, member of Bharatiya Janata Party
- Sheetal Sharma (born 1984), Indian fashion designer
- Sheetal Sheth (born 1976), American actress and producer
- Sheetal Singh, Indian actress
- Sheetal Thakur (born 1991), Indian actress.
- Sheetal Vyas, American film producer

== Notable people named Shital ==
- Shital Bhatia, Indian film producer
- Shital Mahajan (born 1982), Indian extreme-sportswoman
- Shital Morjaria, Indian journalist and film-maker
- Shital Shah (born 1965), Indian actress
- Shital Thakkar, Indian actress
