= Maach Mishti & More =

2013 Indian Bengali film

- Directed by: Mainak Bhaumik
- Produced by: Mojo Productions (P) Ltd. Tripod entertainment
- Music by: Neel Dutt
- Release date: 4 January 2013 (Kolkata)
- Running time: 105 minutes
- Country: India
- Languages: Bengali; English
- Budget: ₹8 million (US$83,000)

Maach Mishti & More (English: Fish, sweet and more) is a 2013 Indian Bengali language drama film directed by Mainak Bhaumik. This is a comedy film about today's Bengali generation. Rituparno Ghosh wrote lyrics of the songs of this film.

== Plot ==
The film looks at a Bengali joint family of Kolkata in the present time. The grandfather (Soumitra Chatterjee) is modern, mingles freely with youngsters, and wears hip clothes. The parents (Anuradha Roy and Pradip Mukherjee) are comparatively conventional but generally do not interfere in their kids' lives. The oldest, Rahul (Souvik Kundagrami), a successful NRI, returns to base with his wife (Swastika Mukherjee) with plans to open an American food restaurant. The second son, Ronnie (Parambrato), is a corporate honcho going steady with a rich Marwari girl called Swati (Rachita Chauhan), but is not sure about whether he really is in love with her or whether the slightly crazy Ishaani (Raima Sen) fascinates him more. The youngest, Raj (Anubrata), is a wannabe filmmaker with a mind of his own, and his pockets filled with money doled out by the elders. During the story, Rahul falls in love with June, a girl who helps him set up a restaurant. They almost make out, but Rahul desists and leaves the place, ruining everything. An angry and frustrated Reena, meanwhile, leaves home because Rahul has been ignoring her for a long time. Later, Rahul goes to Reena's home and asks for forgiveness, and they reconcile. The film closes with Rahul and his wife going back to the US to open a Bengali restaurant called Maach Misti & More. Again, Ronnie is confused by Swati and her father. The cultural differences between Marwaris and Bengalis play a huge role in ruining their relationship. Swati's father is a financially oriented person who dominates their relationship, while Swati does not give any importance to Ronnie's opinions. Around this time, the slightly wacky but free-spirited Ishani, a college friend, comes into Ronnie's life. Their story ends as Ronnie politely makes Swati realise they are not made for each other, and that things would not work out between them. Instead of marrying Swati, he goes on a vacation to Goa with Ishani.

== Cast ==
- Soumitra Chatterjee as grandfather
- Swastika Mukherjee as Reena
- Anubrata Basu as Raj
- Parno Mittra as Sunny / Sunaina
- Raima Sen as Ishaani
- Parambrata Chattopadhyay as Ronnie
- Pradip Mukherjee
- Mithu Chakraborty
- Souvik Kundagrami as Rahul
- Neha Panda as Piya
- Anuradha Roy
- Rachita Chauhan Bhattacharya as Swati
- Pamela Bhutoria as June

== Soundtrack ==
Music of the film is composed by National Award winning music director Neel Dutt and the lyrics are penned by Srijit Mukherji, Souvik Misra and Rituparno Ghosh. The guitarist is Amyt Datta.

#	Title	Singer(s)
1	"Tumi Ebar"	Somlata Acharyya Chowdhury
2	"Daak Peon"	Neel Dutt
3	"Dekha Habe"	Rupankar Bagchi
4	"Ami Jodi Bhir Hoye Jai"	Ishita Chakravarty
5	"Majhe Majhe"	Timir Biswas
6	"Maach Mishti And More (Theme)"	Instrumental
7	"Tumi Ebar (Karaoke)"	Instrumental
8	"Dekha Habe (Karaoke)"	Instrumental

The music of the film received favourable reviews from critics and audience because of its freshness and feel-good rhythm. They have a romantic flavour with a breath of independence to them. All the songs – Tumi Ebar, Daak Peon, Dekha Habe, Majhe Majhe and Ami Jodi Bhir Hoye Jai appealed to the mass, especially the youth. The song Tumi Ebar was singled out for maximum praise because of its rendition by Somlata Acharyya Chowdhury, lyrics by Srijit Mukherji and music by Neel Dutt. The music of Maach Mishti and More received numerous nominations at prestigious award ceremonies.

== Awards and nominations ==
Filmfare Awards East:

- Best Actor Supporting Role Female – Bengali – Swastika Mukherjee (Nominated)
- Best Actor Supporting Role Female – Bengali – Raima Sen (Nominated)
- Best Music Director – Bengali – Neel Dutt (Nominated)
- Best Lyricist – Bengali – Srijit Mukherji for Tumi Ebar (Nominated)
- Best Singer Female – Bengali – Somlata Acharyya Chowdhury for Tumi Ebar (Nominated)

Zee Bangla Gaurav Samman:

- Best Director – Mainak Bhaumik (Nominated)
- Best Lyrics – Srijit Mukherji for Tumi Ebar (Nominated)
- Best Playback Singer – Female (Film) – Somlata Acharyya Chowdhury for Tumi Ebar (Nominated)

== See also ==
- Dutta Vs Dutta, a 2012 Bengali-language film
