= Nayan Padrai =

American film director

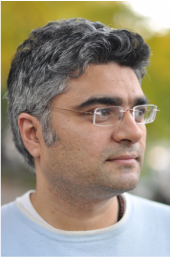
- Nayan Padrai
- Occupation(s): Screenwriter, producer, director
- Years active: 1997–present

Nayan Padrai (born 1975) is a screenwriter, producer, and director. Padrai co-wrote, produced, and directed his first feature film When Harry Tries to Marry released in the US on April 22, 2011. He also produced the film's soundtrack. His next film is Billion Dollar Raja inspired by the true story of the largest insider trading case in US history.

== Early life ==
Padrai is a Kutchi Gujarati, born in Mumbai and raised in Forest Hills, New York, Nayan grew passionate about writing and acting at Forest Hills High School. From there, Nayan studied drama at Queensborough Community College and transferred to focus on screenwriting and acting in New York City at the School of Visual Arts, and continued his training at Gotham Writers' Workshop. He studied acting with Lisa Eichhorn, Joe Paradise, and Matt Mitler.

== Festivals, Awards, Appearances ==
Nayan has won several awards and accolades for his screenwriting efforts at screen writing festivals and contests. In 2014, he was honored by the Writers Guild of America, West Feature Access Project for his screenplay of Billion Dollar Raja based on a story by Sheetal Vyas and Nayan Padrai. In 2009, his script for When Harry Tries to Marry with writing partner Ralph Stein was a top ten finalist at Creative Screenwriting Magazine (Expo Contest). When Harry Tries to Marry was a winner at the Texas Film Institute competition and at the Empire Screenplay Competition. He was accepted to the Sundance Independent Producer Conference in 2004. His writing has placed in various stages of quarter-final, semi-final, and finals competition at Austin Film Festival, Academy of Motion Pictures Arts & Sciences – Nicholl Fellowship, Breckenridge Screenplay Competition, Lone Star Screenplay Competition, Open-Door Script Magazine Contest, Writer's Network Competition, and Chesterfield Writer's Film Project.

Nayan's debut film When Harry Tries to Marry has become a festival darling. It has won Best Audience Award, Best Crossover Film, and Best New Talent at London Asian Film Festival. It also won Best Feature Film (Comedy) at Jersey Shore Film Festival. The film was a marquee screening of the Austin Film Festival, where it had its World Premiere, and its international premiere was at Mumbai Film Festival. The film was an official selection of the Gold Coast International Film Festival.

Nayan has been a guest speaker at various industry events, and colleges including Ithaca College, Pace University, and Stonybrook University. In 2006, the South Asian Student Alliance (S.A.S.A.) bestowed Nayan with a Visionary Award for his work in the media and entertainment sector. Nayan is a member of the Writers Guild of America, West, where he is a Co-Chair of the Asian American Writers Committee, and Broadcast Music, Inc.

== Recent and upcoming work ==
As described in his guest blog for IndieWire’s Hope for Film series, Nayan launched 108 Production to make films and 108 Pics to "direct distribute" them.

Nayan has adapted the screenplay for the award-winning, best-selling novel Beneath a Marble Sky.

108 Production has announced a film entitled Billion Dollar Raja inspired by the true story of the largest insider trading case in US history, this David vs. Goliath tale follows the journey of a tenacious SEC attorney, who is forced to fight the system to investigate a mafia style operation in the shady underbelly of Wall Street offices – filled with high profile tipsters, sexual favors, naked decadence, wild Super Bowl bashes, unapologetic greed, major corporations, secret wiretaps, the feds, and the billionaire “king of kings”… Raj Rajaratnam." The screenplay is written by Nayan Padrai, based on a story by Sheetal Vyas and Nayan Padrai, and to be produced by them.

== Filmography ==
- When Harry Tries to Marry (2011)
- Billion Dollar Raja (announced)

== Career in Media, Marketing, Entertainment ==
In 1997, Nayan was an associate producer of the prestigious Music Festival of India, to celebrate India's 50th year of independence. He produced the video of the concert at Carnegie Hall.

Prior to launching his filmmaking career at the age of 34, Nayan was the Co-Founder and President of Cinemaya Media Group, then one of the largest South Asian media, entertainment and marketing conglomerates in the US. While at the company, Nayan wrote, produced and/or directed over 300 hours of Indian television programming across genres, oversaw publication of several newspaper titles, the development of a radio station, a television network, and founded Elephant Advertising, an advertising agency, which was one of the top 15 multi-cultural advertising agencies (ranked by Ad-Age).
