= Happy Pill (film) =

2018 film by Mainak Bhaumik

- Theatrical Release Poster
- Directed by: Mainak Bhaumik
- Written by: Mainak Bhaumik
- Produced by: Rupa Datta; Nil Ratan Datta
- Starring: Ritwick Chakraborty; Parno Mittra; Sohini Sarkar; Mir Afsar Ali
- Cinematography: Aditya Kapur
- Edited by: Rick Basu
- Music by: Savvy Gupta
- Production company: Camellia Productions Pvt Ltd
- Release date: July 27, 2018
- Running time: 122 minutes
- Country: Inda
- Language: Bengali

Happy Pill is a 2018 Bengali social comedy drama film directed and written by Mainak Bhaumik. The film focuses on Siddhartha, a medical college student who has to drop out for financial reasons. In his free time, he announces that he made a "Happy Pill" which could cure any person's sadness just by consuming. He is helped by his friend Pocha da. Bhaumik gave the reason for writing the film as a "what if" film where someone found the cure to sadness. It stars Ritwick Chakraborty, Sohini Sarkar, Parno Mittra and Mir Afsar Ali and several other supporting actors.

== Plot ==
Siddhartha is a brilliant medical college student who has to drop out for financial problems. As a student, he creates a cure, which gets stolen and patented by his college professor. He goes to frequently hang out with Pochada, who is a struggling businessman having clashes with his mother-in-law and wife. They together strive to be financially advanced. Siddhartha meanwhile faces problems at home to take care of his ailing mother and unmarried sister. His sister gets initially rejected by a man, but looks forward to marriage. In the meantime, Siddhartha spots an young girl holding a tire who looks very happy. This encounter prompts him to see in what way the state of happiness can be achieved in various people. He goes into his room and mixes multiple chemicals to create a mixture which he terms can make any person happy just by consuming it.

Siddhartha takes the initiative of making a commercial profit by stuffing the mixture into consumable pills, while Pochada moves towards commercial sales by packaging the pills into small jars with a happy emoji face printed on it. From there, profits start rolling into their unregistered and non-approved company. The pills are shown to work perfectly by making even the saddest people happy by just taking one of it. Gradually Siddhartha and Pochada with their company achieve massive success at the market.

The scene shifts to show a struggling journalist named Indrani who has issues dealing with her boss and after a recent breakup. She soon comes to know of the company and its "Happy Pills" and endeavors to find the person making the pills, named "Happy wala". At this time, with the increasing popularity of the company, the Kolkata Police and local groups of gangsters and bandits take notice of their activities. One day, an associate of Pochada affiliated with the gangsters get hold of him and threaten him to kill him if he does not bring him to Siddhartha. After the gangster gets into the lab, Siddhartha tricks him by making him mix the wrong chemicals which creates an explosion at the gangster. Pochada and Siddhartha escape while the gangster is distracted.

A few days later, Indrani while on her pursue for "Happy wala" stumbles upon Siddhartha on a street, but is not yet aware that he is the one making the chemicals. They speak a few lines after which he disappears while the camera is focused elsewhere. Afterwards, Indrani becomes aware that the person she interviewed was Siddhartha, through matching traits from a broadcast. They both exchange talks on the phone, hinting at a relationship. Siddhartha's sister Rini matches with an obese man, who Siddhartha dismisses seeing his extreme pride and arrogance. Later, Indrani goes to their home to inform Siddhartha of incoming police danger.

Thereafter, Pocha da gets caught by the police while burning his money notes from selling the pills for running an unauthorized business. Siddhartha manages to catch a taxi before the police with a bag of money and makes his way away from the city. However, on the way, he sees on screens a recording of Narendra Modi saying that all ₹1,000 notes would be demonetized from that day onwards. He then makes his way to a nearby bridge and empties his bag full of ₹1,000 notes by throwing it on the street below. Shorty, he gets arrested by the police and interrogated by them. The pills he made get sent for testing to an authorized laboratory, and the toxicologists then reveal that they found nothing interesting in the chemicals, then which the police release him from custody.

In a tv airing, Siddhartha confirms that his pills had no impact on people's happiness and they were random chemicals. His customers are then shown to flock in huge numbers to his sweet shop business to buy sweets which he named by then as Happy wala's sweets.

== Cast ==
- Ritwick Chakraborty as Siddhartha
- Parno Mittra as Rini
- Mir Afsar Ali as Pochada
- Sohini Sarkar as Indrani, a journalist
- Chandan Sen
- Dolly Basu

== Production ==
The director and writer of the film Mainak Bhaumik commented while speaking about the film, "We grow up, we go to school, college, work hard, do well. Why do we do all this? To be happy. But somewhere in the hectic process of trying to be happy, we get so caught up in life's problems and forget the main reason why we were striving so hard in the first place. So I had made Happy Pill, a 'what if' film exploring the fantasy that what if someone created a medicine for happiness that could instantly make all of us happy?" Comparing the feelings to consuming a paracetamol for a headache or fever, Bhaumik commented that it would have been great if such a thing such as a happy pill existed that would magically make people happy when they were feeling sad and dejected.

Happy Pill marked the collaboration of Parno Mittra with Mainak Bhaumik after five years, following their previous joint effort in the film Ami Aar Amar Girlfriends. She commented on teaming up with Bhaumik for Happy Pill. She considered him as a friend rather than a director, emphasizing that Bhaumik "gives more space to the actors". In the movie, Mittra played the role of Rini, a middle-class girl who is shown to lack confidence and considers herself as non-beautiful. She further said that Rini will be a character who the audience could relate themselves with.

Bhaumik, while introducing the characters to readers, further said that the characters of the film, comparing them to the film watchers, are those troubled by normal everyday problems. He pointed to the central theme as regarding the "if" existence of a pill that could give people the happiness that they could experience as when they were children. He asked whether all those people who post their selfies happily on social media happy in real life. He remarked that the film was such an attempt trying to explore the above questions. According to Bhaumik, Happy Pill showed a brilliant story of a seemingly ordinary man who suddenly came to discover a magical cure for sadness. He described Happy Pill as a "what if" movie emphasizing the plot of the effects of a cure to sadness.

=== Home media ===
In the month of September in 2022, the digital streaming platform Hoichoi started a movie marathon month tiled "14 Din 14 Parbon" by releasing one film every day. 14 films had been released by September 15, 2022, of which Happy Pill was on September 9.

== Soundtrack ==
The song "Bhalo Lege Jaay" written by Dipangshu Acharya and composed by Savvy Gupta was sung by Madhubanti Bagchi, released on July 24, 2018 on the Amara Music channel. The song's music arrangement was made by including western beats. It was composed by infusing a western rhythm into an Indian melody, and sung in a Jibonmukhi style.

All lyrics are written by Dipangshu Acharya; all music is composed by Savvy Gupta.

| No. | Title | Singer | Length |
|---|---|---|---|
| 1. | "Dhulo Jhere Tai" | Rupam Islam | 3:00 |
| 2. | "Thak Pashe Priyotoma" | Anupam Roy | 3:06 |
| 3. | "Bhalo Lege Jaay" | Madhumanti Bagchi [sic] | 3:18 |
| 4. | "Thak Pashe Priyotoma (Reprise Version)" | Arnab Dutta | 2:42 |
| Total length: | | | 12:06 |

== Critical reception ==
The newspaper Sangbad Pratidin described he film as: "This is the first film in Bengali to satirize the problems of moving forward in life at a simple pace, keeping depression away, and the reality of life. By satirizing the lines of Shakti Chatterjee's poetry, it also brings the mood of a thriller presented by a 'beer poet'. Mainak has also shown the death of false love and the birth of true love. If a black girl is not fair, she will not get married. Or getting nervous after being scolded by your boss at work, none of these are true facts of life. Truth is faith. Especially confidence. This is the happy pill of life. Thank you for bringing such a simple truth into the fold of comedy. Thank you also for the witty dialogues." The newspaper described the songs to be unnecessary "with such an engaging cast".

Srijoy Mukherjee of The Times of India gave the film 2.5 out of 5 stars and commented that the four main characters of the film suit their parts well, saying that though the characters are good, with good comedic moments and music, the concept needed to be explored more and ends up going off course with some random storylines. He comments that the written storyline is a great place to start with satisfactory assembling of the film pieces. Mukherjee deems the story as entertaining, but says that the plot is weak when thinking deeper. He writes "Why would people buy an unlicensed, unregistered, illegal pill from shady dealers when proven anti-depressants flood the market? Why is there a subplot of demonetisation when it has nothing to do with the story?" Mukherjee writes that the film had a good cast and direction which was stymied by an average script, subplots and background score.

The Indian Express gave the film 3 out of 5 stars and said that though Mainik Bhaumik created the film through the Bengalization of the Placebo effect, it was executed in a good way. It writes that Happy Pill is entertaining through the manipulation of camera and the charismatic editing of Rick Basu, making it a worth watch. It states that Bhaumik and the crew make it interesting enough to be watchable till the end. Stating that contemporary issues like demonetization help the audience formulate their audience, The Indian Express says that the main actors' acting was surprisingly good. The review gives emphasis to "the excellent acting by Chandan Sen and the supporting characters" and "the songs by Anupam Roy". The review concludes by the statement "With a combination of comedy and satire, 'Happy Pill' is a source of strength in the struggle for survival of people in today's society.

Bhaskar Chattopadhyay of Firstpost gave Happy Pill 2 out 5 stars and remarked about the film, "The power of suggestion is not one to be underestimated, and director Mainak Bhaumik’s latest film Happy Pill revolves around this simple but powerful idea. But while the fulcrum is strong, the film suffers from some pretty ordinary writing which falls flat during the heavy lifting." Chattopadhyay describes that the film seems to oversimplify things to him. He writes, "The dialogues themselves are – for the better part of the film, especially in the romantic exchange of words between Siddhartha and a rookie journalist looking for a big story – very silly, and it tends to break the flow of the film. [...] This message is simple, but important, and although it might not be new, a repetition does no harm."
