= Perspectives on Cinema of Assam =

2008 Indian book

- The cover page of the book
- Author: Manoj Barpujari; Dr Garima Kalita
- Language: English
- Subject: History
- Publisher: Gauhati Cine Club
- Publication date: 2008
- Publication place: Assam, India
- Media type: Print (Hardback & Paperback)

Perspectives on Cinema of Assam is a book on the history of cinema in Assam, edited by Manoj Barpujari and Dr. Garima Kalita. It was published by Gauhati Cine Club in 2008. The book features a collection of articles by well-known authors who traces the evolution of cinema in Assam from its inception to the contemporary stage, including the development of documentaries and the growth of the film industry. Additionally, it contains an exclusive article on the Film Society Movement in Assam, documenting the entire list of films made in the state from 1935 to 2007.
