= All I Want Is Everything =

All I Want Is Everything may refer to:

- All I Want Is Everything (film), a 2013 Indian English film directed by Shital Morjaria and starring Sagari Venkata and Sampada Harkara
- All I Want Is Everything (novel), a book in the Gossip Girls novel series
- "All I Want Is Everything" (Def Leppard song), a 1996 song by Def Leppard from their album Slang
- "All I Want Is Everything" (Bon Jovi song), a song in the Bon Jovi album These Days
- "All I Want Is Everything" (Mindy McCready song), a 1999 song from the album Not So Tough
- "All I Want Is Everything" (Victoria Justice song), a song in the soundtrack album for the Nickelodeon TV series Victorious
