= Ekla Akash =

2012 Indian Bengali film

- Film poster
- Directed by: Sandipan Roy
- Written by: Shibashis Bandyopadhyay
- Story by: Shibashis Bandyopadhyay
- Produced by: Morning Fresh Media Pvt Ltd.
- Starring: Parambrata Chatterjee; Parno Mittra; Goutam Ghose
- Cinematography: Manoj Mishra
- Edited by: Arghyakamal Mitra
- Music by: Jeet Gannguli
- Production company: Morning Fresh Media
- Release date: 5 October 2012 (Kolkata)
- Country: India
- Language: Bengali

Ekla Akash is a 2012 Indian Bengali film directed by Sandipan Roy. The lead characters of this film are Goutam Ghose, Parno Mittra and Parambrata Chatterjee.

== Plot ==
Ekla Akash deals with a troubled marriage between a young couple, Arijit and Nisha. The ambitious couple have reached a point in their relationship where there is no turning back so they continue to live with each other and their child is also born. Arijit’s infidelity is primarily the reason as he is having an affair with his colleague. Arijit also has questions regarding Nisha’s special relationship with her mentor S.R, who is a film director and wants to make a film star. Eventually he does make her a star, but it only makes things worse.

== Cast ==
- Parambrata Chatterjee
- Deboleena Dutta
- Parno Mittra
- Rudranil Ghosh
- Gautam Ghosh

== Soundtrack ==
Ekla Akash

Soundtrack album
- Released: October 2012
- Recorded: 2012
- Genre: Feature film soundtrack
- Label: SVF
- Producer: Morning Fresh Media Pvt Ltd

chronology
Paglu 2 (2012)	Ekla Akash (2012)	Challenge 2 (2012)

Singles from Ekla Aakash
- 1. "Ekla Akash (Male Version)" Released: 18 Sep 2012; 2. "Ekla Aakash" Released: 21 Sep 2012; 3. "Chai Udaan" Released: 27 Sep 2012

All lyrics are written by Srijato, Sandipan Roy; all music is composed by Jeet Gannguli.

No.	Title	Lyrics	Singer(s)	Length
1.	"Ekla Aakash (Male)"	Sandipan Roy	Sandipan Roy	3:04
2.	"Chai Udaan"	Srijato	Jeet Ganguli	1:56
3.	"Naina"		Ustad Rashid Khan
4.	"Diwani"		Sunidhi Chauhan
5.	"Ekla Aakash (Female)"	Sandipan Roy	Shreya Ghoshal	1:52
