= Onko Ki Kothin =

2025 Bengali drama film

- Directed by: Saurav Palodhi
- Produced by: Rana Sarkar
- Starring: Riddhiman Banerjee; Gitashree Chakraborty; Tapomoy Deb; Parno Mittra; Prasun Shome; Ushasie Chakraborty; Sankar Debnath
- Cinematography: Ankkit Sengupta
- Edited by: Pronoy Dasgupta
- Music by: Debdeep Mukhopadhyay
- Production company: Dag Creative Media
- Release date: 23 June 2025
- Country: India
- Language: Bengali
- Box office: ₹0.84 crore

Onko Ki Kothin (lit. 'Unequal Equations') is a 2025 Indian Bengali-language drama film directed by Saurav Palodhi and produced by Rana Sarkar. Starring Parno Mittra and Ushasie Chakraborty, the film explores themes of systemic corruption in teacher recruitment and the resilience of marginalized youth. It premiered at the 55th International Film Festival of India (IFFI) and received critical acclaim for its social commentary.

== Plot ==
Set against the backdrop of the COVID-19 pandemic in India, Onko ki Kothin explores the lives of three underprivileged children in Kolkata as they navigate the challenges posed by systemic failures.

Babin is an aspiring doctor whose father suffers from severe lung disease caused by working in a brick kiln, while his mother works as a housemaid. Tyre dreams of becoming an engineer and is raised by his mother, a sex worker, who seeks social acceptance. Dolly aspires to be a nurse and is supported by her single mother, who works as a nurse's assistant.

Despite the harsh realities of poverty, where parents are often too focused on survival to nurture their children's ambitions, these children maintain a sense of hope. They believe that Babin will heal the sick, Dolly will assist him, and Tyre will build their hospital. Their makeshift medical practice, created from discarded supplies, reflects a blend of childhood innocence and the starkness of their environment.

The children's lives take a dramatic turn when Babin's father's health deteriorates due to unsafe working conditions. In a moment of desperation, the children steal an oxygen cylinder in an attempt to save him. This act leads to the exposure of various issues, including corruption in the teacher recruitment process that hampers their access to education, healthcare disparities that prevent slum residents from receiving essential medical care, and the cycle of intergenerational poverty that confines families to a bleak existence.

A significant scene depicts Dolly's mother sacrificing her own meal, dividing a single fish fry into three portions for the children while she remains hungry, symbolizing both deep love and the effects of systemic deprivation. The children's journey highlights their resilience as they confront bureaucratic indifference and strive to reclaim their futures.

== Cast ==
- Riddhiman Banerjee as Babin, a slum child dreaming of becoming a doctor
- Gitashree Chakraborty as Dolly, who aspires to be a nurse
- Tapomoy Deb as Tyre, an aspiring engineer
- Parno Mittra as Kajol, a compassionate nurse who aids the children
- Prasun Shome as Shah Rukh, a biscuit delivery man who becomes their ally
- Ushasie Chakraborty as Dolly's mother
- Sankar Debnath as Babin's father, an incense factory worker
- Saurav Palodhi as a doctor (cameo)

== Production ==
Director Saurav Palodhi conceived the project following his experience as an Assistant Director on Dev's ''Dhumketu.'' The screenplay, which he co-wrote with Soumit Deb, thoughtfully weaves in real-life accounts of corruption within the education system and the healthcare crises that emerged in the aftermath of the COVID-19 pandemic.

=== Filming ===
The project was filmed in the Rajarhat area, specifically in the Thakdari slum. The shooting lasted approximately 14 to 15 days, following extensive pre-production planning and workshops. The emphasis on thorough preparation contributed to ensuring that all aspects of the project were well-organized. Palodhi described the process as "A courageous effort to amplify marginalized voices through authentic settings".

=== Soundtrack ===
The soundtrack of Onko ki Kothin includes a powerful and emotional song performed by Lagnajita Chakraborty, which resonates deeply with the film's themes. Additionally, the soundtrack features a rap number that has received acclaim for its unique blend of innocence and social relevance, capturing the essence of the children's experiences and challenges. Furthermore, veteran singer Nachiketa Chakraborty has also contributed to the film by recording a track, adding to the overall musical depth and emotional layer of the narrative.

== Release ==
Initially scheduled for 5 September 2024, the release was postponed due to the RG Kar Movement and Later released on 23 June 2025. It had a wide theatrical release in 2025. The film was screened at the Indian Panorama section of IFFI 2024 in Goa and received community screenings in Siliguri organized by local police.

=== Piracy issues ===
Producer Rana Sarkar filed official complaints against digital piracy after unauthorized copies surfaced online during its theatrical run.

== Reception ==
=== Critical response ===
Poorna Banerjee from Times of India reviewed: Directed by Saurav Palodhi, known for the web series ''Kholamkuchi,'' ''Onko Ki Kothin'' follows three inseparable friends—Babin (Riddhiman Banerjee), Dolly (Gitashree Chakraborty), and Tyre (Tapomoy Deb)—who dream of becoming a doctor, a nurse, and an engineer. Their lives take a turn when they are forced out of school and face challenges, leading them to take matters into their own hands by attempting to build a hospital. The film explores innocence and imagination through a child's perspective, highlighting the strong bond between the trio amid their struggles. The young actors deliver natural performances that bring warmth to their roles, ensuring that poverty doesn't overshadow their dignity and joy. Ushasie Chakraborty impresses as Dolly’s mother, and Sankar Debnath provides a poignant portrayal of Babin’s ailing father. While the narrative occasionally diverges with unnecessary subplots and some jokes that fall flat, the overall humor generally resonates. Ankkit Sengupta’s cinematography effectively captures the urgency of the children's mission, though the editing could be tighter. The music, featuring Lagnajita Chakraborty’s haunting ''Amake Golpo Bolo'' and the energetic rap ''Chaap Niye Laabh Nei,'' adds to the film's charm with its reflective lyrics. Despite minor flaws, ''Onko Ki Kothin'' is a heartfelt story of resilience and friendship, told with sincerity and humor, making it worthwhile for family audiences."

Anandabazar Patrika poetically reviewed and described: In contrast to the sea of big-budget Bengali films featuring popular directors and stars, Saurav Palodhi's 'Onko ki Kothin' (How Tough is Math) emerges as a refreshing breath of air. Rather than depicting the polished, urban landscapes that dominate Bengali cinema, this film presents a starkly realistic setting deeply rooted in the challenges faced by its characters.

Sujoy Bandyopadhyay from Sangbad Pratidin reviewed: 'How tough is counting? Life's calculations are challenging, yet with the strength of love and solidarity, solutions become attainable.' Director Saurav Palodhi effectively conveys this simple yet profound truth through his storytelling. ''Onko ki Kothin'' is ultimately a narrative centered on individuals who experience 'not having' far more than 'having'—and who fiercely fight to survive against all odds."

Durant Barta emphasizes that Saurav Palodhi's 'Onko Ki Kothin' offers a refreshing perspective by portraying the dreams and struggles of three schoolchildren aspiring to be a doctor, nurse, and engineer amid societal challenges, conveying a powerful message about love, friendship, and resilience through imaginative storytelling and heartfelt performances.

Aajkal's Review of the film emphasized that "innocence disarms harsh reality," particularly highlighting Riddhiman Banerjee’s standout performance and the pivotal oxygen cylinder heist sequence as a metaphor for community resistance. They described ''Onko ki Kothin'' as "a heartfelt tale that demonstrates how courage can simplify life’s toughest challenges."

=== Audience response ===
The film emerged as a surprising success largely through word-of-mouth promotion, with numerous reports indicating that audiences were traveling from suburban areas to urban centers specifically to attend screenings. This overwhelming interest exemplifies the film's ability to resonate with viewers and highlights its impact across a wider community.

== Awards ==
- Best Feature Film (Jury Award) at Indian World Film Festival
- The Silver Lotus Award (Rajat Kamal) at 72nd National Film Awards for Best Child Artists -
- Tapomoy Deb
- Riddhiman Banerjee
- Gitashree Chakraborty
