= Urf Ghanta =

Indian Hindi comedy film

- Directed by: Aayush Saxena
- Written by: Jeetu Shivhare, Aayush Saxena, Abhyaank
- Produced by: Vinod Babeley; Mili Devendra Rai; Shashi Radheshyaam Rai
- Starring: Jitu Shivhare; Mukesh S. Bhatt; Pamela Singh Bhutoria; Samridhi Chandola; Ram Naresh Diwakar; Rajendra Gupta; Mohan Kapur; Ravi Kishan; Sunita Rajwar; Chitrashi Rawat
- Cinematography: Ayan Saxena
- Edited by: Vikas Sharma
- Music by: Yash Kapoor Parag Chhabra
- Distributed by: ShemarooMe
- Release date: 10 September 2021
- Running time: 95 minutes
- Country: India
- Language: Hindi

Urf Ghanta is a 2021 Indian Hindi comedy film written and directed by Aayush Saxena, starring Mukesh S. Bhatt, Pamela Singh Bhutoria, Samridhi Chandola, Ram Naresh Diwakar, Rajendra Gupta, Mohan Kapur, Ravi Kishan, Sunita Rajwar, and Chitrashi Rawat.

== Plot ==
The movie begins when a bus driver sees a nude man. This nude man named Ghanta or Ghanteshwar is the protagonist.

Urf Ghanta is the story of a forty-year-old unmarried man who is looking for a wife. The Gods do not help Ghanta to achieve his goal though he is devout. His best friend Sudama tries to help him, but without success.

== Cast ==
- Jitu Shivhare as Ghanta
- Mukesh S. Bhatt
- Pamela Singh Bhutoria as Jagmeera
- Samridhi Chandola as Meenakshi
- Ram Naresh Diwakar as Sudama
- Rajendra Gupta as Doctor
- Mohan Kapur as Unknown Stranger
- Ravi Kishan as Shiva God
- Sunita Rajwar as Ghanta's chachi
- Chitrashi Rawat as Lollypop
- Himanshu Sharma as Guddan
- Vijay kumar Dogra as Piddi Chacha
- Anju Gaur as Mata
- Jeetu Shastri as Temple Priest
