= When Harry Tries to Marry =

- Directed by: Nayan Padrai
- Screenplay by: Ralph Stein; Nayan Padrai
- Produced by: Nayan Padrai; Sheetal Vyas; Ritu Ahuja Bhushan Thakkar; Ralph Stein
- Starring: Rahul Rai; Stefanie Estes; Freishia Bomanbehram
- Cinematography: Nick Taylor
- Edited by: Jennifer Lilly
- Music by: Siddharth Kasyap; Featuring Sarah Sharp
- Production company: 108 Production
- Distributed by: 108 Pics
- Release dates: October 22, 2010 (Austin); April 22, 2011 (United States)
- Running time: 93 minutes
- Country: United States
- Language: English

When Harry Tries to Marry is a 2010 American romantic comedy film, co-written, produced and directed by Nayan Padrai and starring Rahul Rai, Stefanie Estes, and Freishia Bomanbehram.

== Development and release ==
Initially a featured screenplay project at the Sundance Institute Independent Producers’ Conference in 2004; and a top-ten finalist of the Creative Screenwriting contest in 2009, filming commenced on October 21, 2009, in New York City, with additional location shooting in Kuch, India.

The film had its world premiere at the Austin Film Festival on October 22, 2010 and later played at the Mumbai Film Festival on October 27, 2010. Subsequently, the film won Best Film (Audience Award), Best Crossover Film, and Best New Talent (Rahul Rai) at the Gala Dinner held at BAFTA by the London Asian Film Festival. The film also won Best Feature Film (Comedy) at the Jersey Shore Film Festival, and was an official selection of the inaugural Gold Coast International Film Festival.

The film was released theatrically in the United States on April 22, 2011, and became available on video-on-demand and pay-per-view on August 1, 2011, in USA and Canada.

== Cast ==
- Rahul Rai as Harry Shankar
- Stefanie Estes as Theresa
- Freishia Bomanbehram as Nita
- Osvaldo Hernandez Chavez as Louis
- Caitlin Gold as Mary
- Tony Mirrcandani as Dev Shankar
- Zenobia Shroff as Geeta Shankar
- Kanti Pandya as Pandit Deepak
- Micky Makhija as Commissioner Shah
- Grant Krethik as Slick Rick and Game Show Host
- Lauren LoGuidice as Angela
- Jagdish Patel as Chhotu

== Soundtrack ==
The soundtrack of the motion picture features music by Sarah Sharp, The June Junes, Small*Star, Andrea Perry, Craig Marshall, Ter'ell Shahid, Shreya Goshal, Udit Narayan, Madhushree, and Rishikesh Kamkerkar.

Siddharth Kasyap was the music producer of the Indian music and background score composer. Sarah Sharp was the music supervisor. Two music videos from the film's soundtrack have been released: "She's the Latest One" by The June Junes, and "Love is Everywhere" by Sarah Sharp.

No.	Title	Writer(s)	Performer(s)	Length
1.	"Dulhe Raja"	Ibrahim Ashk	Udit Narayan and Madhushree
2.	"Aao Naache Gaaye/Garba Ki Dhun"	Ibrahim Ashk	Shreya Ghoshal and Rishikesh Kamerkar
3.	"Bhang Chadi"	Ibrahim Ashk	Rishikesh Kamerkar
4.	"Love Is Everywhere"	Sarah Sharp and Andrea Perry	Sarah Sharp
5.	"You Were Mine"	Sarah Sharp, Rachel Loy and Nayan Padrai	Sarah Sharp
6.	"Blame It on the Night"	Sarah Sharp	Sarah Shar
7.	"Hot as Hell"	Sarah Sharp and Buffalo Speedway	Sarah Sharp
8.	"It's in the Way"	Andrea Perry	Andrea Perry
9.	"Pull Me Up"	Rachel Loy, Adam Lilley and Paul Buono	SmallStar
10.	"Live a Little"	Rachel Loy, Adam Lilley and Brian Keane	SmallStar
11.	"Garden of Eden"
12.	Untitled	Rachel Loy and Adam Lilley	SmallStar
13.	"Shake That Thang"	Duane Hunter	Ter'ell Shahid
14.	"Chasing Sleep"	Sarah Sharp, Buffalo Speedway and Sam Arnold	Sarah Sharp
15.	"Settle for Me"	Craig Marshall	Craig Marshall
16.	"It's Coming Back"	Craig Marshall	Craig Marshall
17.	"She's the Latest One"	Samuel J. Woldenberg, Max B. Woldenberg, Stephen Sulikowski and Mike Krompass	The June Junes
18.	"Setting Sun"	Samuel J. Woldenberg, Max B. Woldenberg, Stephen Sulikowski and Mike Krompass	The June Junes
19.	"There's Something About Harry"	Carlie Mantilla and Doni Carley	Carlie Mantilla and Doni Carley
20.	"Desperately"	Craig Marshall	Craig Marshall
