= Chitra Chinta =

- Some coverpages of the journal
- Former editors: List of editors Kanak Chandra Kalita (2003-2005); Mrigen Das (2006); Ranjit Das (2007); Madhurima Baruah (2008)
- Categories: Cine journal
- Frequency: Annual
- Founder: Bhabendra Nath Saikia
- Founded: 2003
- Company: Gauhati Cine Club
- Country: Assam, India
- Based in: Guwahati
- Language: Assamese

Chitra Chinta (Assamese: চিত্ৰ চিন্তা) is an annual cine journal published by Gauhati Cine Club. The journal is the brainchild of Bhabendra Nath Saikia, noted Assamese filmmaker who started publishing it in the early part of the last century. It was an irregularly published newsletter until 2003 when it was redesigned as an annual magazine. It covers contributions from all the stalwarts of Assamese literature and film critics. The journal won the prestigious Prag Cine Award.

== See also ==
- List of Assamese periodicals
