= And We Play On =

2012 documentary film

- Directed by: Pramod Purswane
- Written by: Pramod Purswane
- Produced by: Pramod Purswane
- Release date: 2012
- Running time: 50 minutes
- Country: India
- Language: Hindi

And We Play On is a 2012 documentary film about Vivek Singh, a former hockey Olympian who died of cancer in 2005. It was written, directed, and produced by Pramod Purswane, a Mumbai-based filmmaker. The film was conferred the National Film Award for Best Non-Feature Film at the 59th National Film Awards.

== Overview ==
The documentary tells the story of Vivek Singh's life after he died in 2005. It was mostly filmed in Varanasi and was made on a budget of 14 lakhs. The focus is on Vivek's struggle with cancer. The plot revolves around Vivek's family, especially his father Gaurishankar Singh, who played a crucial role in creating the Vivek Singh Hockey Academy in Varanasi. The academy, established in memory of Vivek, currently trains over 100 boys and girls, facing financial challenges without government support.

== Awards ==
In April 2012, the documentary was chosen for a national award and won the Golden Lotus Award for Best Non-Feature Film at the 2012 National Film Awards.
