= Pramod Purswane =

Indian filmmaker

- Born: Mumbai, India
- Occupation: Filmmaker
- Awards: National Film Award for Best Non-Feature Film (2012)

Pramod Purswane is an Indian filmmaker based in Mumbai, India. He received the National Film Award for Best Non-Feature Film at the 59th National Film Awards for his documentary titled And We Play On. The film revolves around the life of Vivek Singh, a former hockey Olympian who died from cancer in 2005.

== Early life ==
Purswane grew up in Mahim, Mumbai, where his father worked as the vice-principal of KJ Khilnani High School. In the late 1970s, the family faced financial challenges when his father switched to distributing and exhibiting Hindi films in the Middle East, a business affected by the home video boom in the early 1980s. Purswane earned a post-graduate law degree from National College in Bandra in 1993.

After trying acting, advertising, and legal drafting, Purswane joined television as a production assistant in 2001.

== Career ==
=== And We Play On ===
Purswane made his directorial debut with And We Play On, a documentary about former hockey Olympian Vivek Singh, who battled cancer until his death in 2005. The film portrays Vivek's father, Gaurishankar Singh, a professor and hockey coach, who supported Vivek through a four-year battle against cancer. Vivek had played for the Indian hockey team from 1984 to 1990, including the 1988 Seoul Olympics.

=== Come December 3 ===
His another film, Come December 3, is a docudrama centered around the life of Ramakant Achrekar, who was a cricket coach known for coaching cricketer Sachin Tendulkar.

== Awards ==
In 2012, Pramod Purswane received the National Film Award for Best Non-Feature Film at the 59th National Film Awards for And We Play On.
