= Chatrak =

- Directed by: Vimukthi Jayasundara
- Produced by: Vinod Lahoti
- Starring: Paoli Dam; Sudip Mukherjee; Tómas Lemarquis
- Cinematography: Channa Deshapriya
- Edited by: Julie Beziau
- Music by: Roman Dymmy
- Release date: 18 May 2011 (Cannes)
- Running time: 90 minutes
- Country: India
- Language: Bengali

Chatrak (English: Mushrooms) is a 2011 Indian Bengali erotic drama film directed by Sri Lankan director Vimukthi Jayasundara. It was screened at several film festivals worldwide, including the Directors' Fortnight at the 2011 Cannes Film Festival.

== Plot ==
Rahul (Sudeep Mukherjee) is a Bengali architect working at construction sites in Dubai. He returns home to Kolkata after several years. His girlfriend, Paoli (Paoli Dam), has been waiting for his return.

Rahul's seemingly successful life is overshadowed by the search for his brother (Sumeet Thakur), said to now be mad and living in the forest, where he sleeps in the trees and subsists on vegetation. This brother befriends a French soldier in the jungle. Rahul and Paoli journey in search of his lost brother.

The story involves people who are expropriated for construction projects.

== Cast ==
- Paoli Dam as Paoli
- Sudip Mukherjee as Rahul
- Tómas Lemarquis as French soldier
- Sumeet Thakur as Rahul's brother
- Anubrata Basu as Anubrata

== Production ==
Paoli Dam admitted that the scene in which she receives unsimulated cunnilingus by Anubrata Basu was difficult for her. "Well, the fact that nobody from Tollywood or Bollywood has ever done something like this and I had no reference point. I didn't know how to prepare for the scene," she said.

== Release and screenings ==
Chatrak was screened at film festivals like the prestigious Directors' Fortnight in the 2011 Cannes Film Festival, the 2011 Toronto International Film Festival and the Pacific Meridian film festival in Vladivostok, Russia.

It has not received a theatrical release.

== Reception ==
The Hollywood Reporter commented on Mushrooms that, "The film's abstract naturalism does create an austere portrait of a crass and careless human society but any larger meaning gets lost amid the film's many non-events and preening nihilism." The Variety review noted the "extremely slow-burning story", saying, "... the main element uniting Jayasundara's plot strands is a sense of torpor..." A review in the online film magazine Notebook praised the film, noting that it artistically portrays "...Cinematic dreams and nightmares, visible intuitions of the world around, visual understanding of what corruption of the society and corruption of the soul can do." Sight & Sound of the British Film Institute praised it, stating "Disconcerting though the plot may at least initially be, the film has its wild as well as some comic moments that soon win the viewer over."

== Controversy ==
A scene in Chatrak with explicit frontal nudity caused uproar in India, especially in Kolkata, where the film was mainly shot. A version without the sexually explicit scene was arranged to be shown in the 2011 Kolkata Film Festival.

Director Jayasundara admitted that there are several versions of Chatrak, and some do not contain the sex scene. He also admitted that he was surprised to witness negative feedback due to the inclusion of such sex scene in his film.
