= The June Junes =

- Born: Max and Samuel; June 23, 1992 (age 34)
- Origin: Monterrey, Mexico
- Genres: Pop rock, alternative rock, indie rock
- Instruments: Vocals, guitar, piano
- Years active: 2010–present
- Label: Intermusic Group
- Members: Sam Woldenberg; Max Woldenberg
- Website: TheJuneJunes.com

The June Junes are a band formed by Sam Woldenberg (aka Jacbern) and his twin brother Max. They were born in Monterrey, Mexico, on June 23, 1992 in the Hospital San José. They moved to San Antonio, Texas where they attended San Antonio Academy, and moved to Los Angeles at age 14. They chose their name because they were born in June, they are twins (that's why the double "June"), and also because they call their grandmother June. Growing up, they listened to songs by Juan Gabriel and Luis Miguel. Some of their other influences include The Beatles, U2, Soda Stereo, and Mana.

The June Junes produced their first EP in 2009. They released their single She's the Latest One in 2011. The June Junes have performed at the Troubadour, opened up for Rooney, and premiered at the SXSW Music Festival and Austin Film Festival. Two of their songs were included in the soundtrack of the 2011 romantic comedy When Harry Tries to Marry.

In 2014, Jacbern co-wrote Sie7e's single Tocando el Cielo with Sie7e and Cris Zalles. He has also written with Carlos Perez Soto.

== Discography ==
=== Soundtracks ===
Year	Album details
2011	When Harry Tries to Marry: Released: March 4, 2011; Formats: CD, digital download

=== Singles ===
Year	Single
2011	"She's the Latest One"

=== Music videos ===
Year	Song	Director
2011	She's the Latest One	Ricardo Moreno
