= Gandu (film) =

2010 Indian Bengali film

- Directed by: Qaushiq Mukherjee, known as 'Q'
- Written by: Surojit Sen; Qaushiq Mukherjee
- Produced by: Taha Kamran
- Starring: Shizu
- Cinematography: Q
- Edited by: Manas Mittal; Quashik Mukherjee
- Music by: Five Little Indians
- Release date: 29 October 2010 (New York City)
- Running time: 85 minutes
- Country: India
- Language: Bengali

Gandu is a 2010 Indian erotic black-and-white art drama film directed by Qaushiq Mukherjee. It features Anubrata Basu, Joyraj Bhattacharjee, Kamalika Banerjee, Silajit Majumder, and Rii Sen in the lead roles. The film's music is by the alternative rock band Five Little Indians. Gandu previewed at Yale University before making its international premiere on 29 October 2010 at the 2010 South Asian International Film Festival in New York City. Gandu was an official selection at the 2011 Berlin International Film Festival and was also screened at the Slamdance Film Festival.

Gandu has received mainly positive reviews from critics. John Reis called it "a stunning visual and narrative feast" while Variety said it is "a happily transgressive rhyme-fueled romp".

Gandu has caused some controversy because of language and scenes of nudity and sex. Many audience left cinema halls during the sex scenes. Because of the controversy the film did not have its first public screening in India until 2012 at the Osian Film Festival. The protagonist Anubrata Basu is shown with his penis fully erect being stroked and fellated in a sex scene with Rii Sen.

== Plot ==
The movie is about an unnamed protagonist who is called Gandu (an Indian slang/swear word that would literally translate to 'of the ass'; the English translation running in the subtitle translates it to the English 'Asshole') by most in the movie. Gandu is a frustrated teenager who raps in Bengali (it is later revealed in the movie that he is also member of a rap group). Gandu's mother seemingly supports the family through the magnanimity of her 'lover' Dasbabu. His mother and Dasbabu are shown having graphic sex a number of times. Gandu himself repeatedly sneaks into the room of the copulating couple to steal money from Dasbabu's wallet, which he uses to buy drugs and play games in Dasbabu's Internet Cafe. Gandu seemingly has complex emotions regarding this thievery and takes precautions to hide it from his mother.

Gandu is also apparently quite lonely. His choice of hairstyle (shaved nearly bald) and general proclivity to drugs and rap make him an object of ridicule with most of his peers, who mock him as 'Egghead Gandu'. His loneliness is dispelled when he literally bumps into 'Ricksha', a cycle rickshaw driver, who slaps Gandu and then scares him off by a bizarre show of kung fu. That night Gandu has a dream of himself and Ricksha in a near naked embrace.

On one of his stealing missions, Gandu's mother sees him and hides him from Dasbabu and seemingly laughs in complicity. This causes Gandu great anguish and he curses in frustration. His mother then comes and knocks on his door. He is late in responding and she slaps him angrily and walks away.

Gandu urges Ricksha to 'take him away'. They go off to consume Dhatura seeds which causes them both to go on a strange and extremely intense hallucinogenic trip. When they come to their senses they find they have no money. In a meta narrative scene the director Q himself drives into the scene and Gandu is told by Ricksha that Gandu is a character in a movie being shot by Q. Gandu cannot quite comprehend this.

Gandu comes back to Kolkata to find that he has won the Bhutan State lottery of fifty thousand rupees; then he gives his mother some of the money and goes on a crack binge with Ricksha. Ricksha then admonishes him for never having actually slept with a woman despite incessantly rapping about cunt, pussy and sex. Gandu then has surrealistic and very explicit sex with an unnamed hooker, who constantly meows and at the end of coitus whispers 'demo' to him. Gandu goes back to Ricksha telling him how he will now record a demo of his rap and show it to the Asian Dub Foundation. The movie closes with Gandu finally becoming successful. Gandu also ponders on the meaning of life and what we must do with it.

== Cast ==
- Anubrata Basu as Gandu/Shubham Singh (the protagonist)
- Joyraj Bhattacharjee/ Joyraj as Ricksha
- Kamalika Banerjee/ Kamalika as Gandu's mother
- Silajit Majumder/ Silajit as Dasbabu
- Rituparna Sen / Rii as the girl in the Cafe/Kaali/the hooker

== Production ==
Gandu was shot in Kolkata on a limited budget with only eight crew members. It was filmed in black and white with one scene in colour and had no official script. Q used a high-definition Canon EOS 7D Single-lens reflex camera to shoot the film. In order to prepare the cast for their nude scenes, Q required them to undergo several workshops in which they used boal techniques. Rituparna, who plays several different roles in the film, is Q's real life girlfriend.

== Music ==
=== Title track ===
The film's soundtrack, composed by the Calcutta-based alternative rock band Five Little Indians and mixed by London-based producer Miti Adhikari, garnered rave reviews.

== Awards ==
- 2010 – Jury Award for Best Film at the South Asian International Film Festival
