= Anubrata Basu =

Bengali film actor

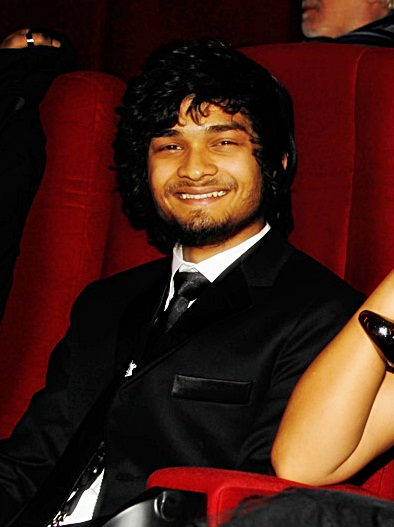
- Anubrata Basu at Berlinale in 2011
- Born: 5 October 1989 (age 36); Calcutta, West Bengal
- Occupation: Actor
- Known for: Chatrak, Gandu

Anubrata Basu (born 5 October 1989 in Calcutta) is a Bengali film actor. Born in India, he started acting through local theatre performances. He received his first commercial acting break with Anjan Dutt's Madly Bangali, where he played one of the main characters, Benji. Since then he has acted in films like Chatrak and Gandu. In Gandu, his performance attracted controversy, as he appears nude, with his penis shown fully erect and engaging in non-simulated on-screen sex. Ever since he is known fondly in the industry as 'The Gandoo'.

== Filmography ==
- Tasher Desh (2012)
- Gandu (2010)
- Maach Mishti & More (2013)
- Chatrak (2011)
- Madly Bangalee (2009)
- Bedroom (2012)
- Ami Ar Amar Girlfriends (2013)
- Chittagong (2012)

== See also ==
- Silajit Majumder, Indian Bengali singer, songwriter, actor
