= Jyotiprasad as a Film Maker =

2005 book by Apurba Sarma

- Coverpage of the book
- Author: Apurba Sarma
- Language: English
- Subject: Biography
- Publisher: Rajib Baruah; Adi Publications
- Publication date: 17 June 2005
- Publication place: Assam, India
- Media type: Print (Hardcover & Paperback)

Jyotiprasad as a Film Maker is a book about the famed director Jyoti Prasad Agarwala, authored by Apurba Sarma and published by Rajib Baruah of Adi Publication on behalf of the Gauhati Cine Club. Released on 17 June 2005, on the occasion of Xilpi Divas, the filmmaker's birthday, the book covers Jyotiprasad's filmmaking concepts and ideas, as well as the national and international cinematic scene of his time.

== See also ==
- Jyoti Prasad Agarwala
- Gauhati Cine Club
