= Ranjana Ami Ar Ashbona =

2011 Indian Bengali film

Ranjana Ami ar Ashbo Na
- Official Theatrical Poster of the film
- Directed by: Anjan Dutt
- Written by: Anjan Dutt
- Produced by: Rana Sarkar
- Starring: Anjan Dutt; Parno Mittra; Lew Hilt; Amyt Datta; Nondon Bagchi; Ushasie Chakraborty
- Cinematography: Supriyo Dutta
- Edited by: Arghyakamal Mitra
- Music by: Neel Dutt
- Distributed by: Dag Creative Media
- Release date: 24 June 2011 (India)
- Country: India
- Language: Bengali

Ranjana Ami Ar Ashbona (transl. Ranjana, I will not come back again) is a 2011 Bengali language Indian rock musical drama film directed by Anjan Dutt. It won three national film awards in 2011 including best music direction and best feature film in Bengali.

== Plot ==
Anjan Dutt, Amyt Datta, Lew Hilt, Nondon Bagchi, all in their mid-50s are members of a successful Bangla-band. They go for a show in North Bengal where Ranjana performs a small opening salutation. Anjan Dutt asks Ranjana (Parno Mittra) to come and meet him in Kolkata and promises to help her in recording her solo. Once in Kolkata, Ranjana stays at Anjan's house with him and his housekeeper, Kanchan Mullick. One night Anjan tries to seduce Ranjana but, due to too much drinking, he faints allowing Ranjana to run. But she stays and nurses him. This changes Anjan's attitude towards her and he teaches her music.

After much insisting, an audio company agrees to record Ranjana's song but no one is interested. Anjan seeks the help of his journalist friend and books a prime-time show on a top news channel to promote her.

This results in making her a super-hit rockstar. Anjan is hospitalized and Ranjana comes to meet and tell him about her first rock concert. Ranjana tries to persuaded him to come to the show. He quotes "Ranjana Ami Ar Ashbona." Anjan dies in the hospital while Ranjana performs in the concert.

== Cast ==
- Anjan Dutt
- Parno Mittra as Ranjana
- Ushasie Chakraborty
- Kanchan Mullick
- Amyt Datta
- Kabir Suman
- Abir Chatterjee
- Deborshi Barat
- Lew Hilt
- Nondon Bagchi

== Soundtrack ==
All music is composed by Neel Dutt.

No.	Title	Singer(s)	Length
1.	"Raasta"	Anjan Dutt	3:51
2.	"Andhakarer Pare"	Somlata Acharyya Chowdhury	4:35
3.	"Ranjana Ami Ar Ashbo Na"	Anjan Dutt	4:15
4.	"Gaanwala"	Kabir Suman	2:45
5.	"Ekla Anek Door"	Somlata Acharyya Chowdhury	3:44
6.	"Brishti"	Anjan Dutt, Somlata Acharyya Chowdhury	5:34
7.	"Chalo Jai"	Somlata Acharyya Chowdhury	3:49
8.	"Sabai"	Anjan Dutt	4:37
9.	"Jagorone Jay Bibhabori"	Somlata Acharyya Chowdhury, Anjan Dutt & Kabir Suman	3:46
10.	"Tumi Asbe Boley"	Somlata Acharyya Chowdhury	5:41
