= Gauhati Cine Club =

GCC
- Gauhati Cine Club
- Founded: 26 April 1965
- Headquarters: Ashiana (1st Floor); Sarbodaya path (Opp. Rajiv Bhawan); G.S. Road, Bhangagarh; Guwahati-5
- Location: Assam India
- Key people: Dr Bhupen Hazarika
- Website: Gauhati Cine Club

Gauhati Cine Club is a registered film society of Assam. It was founded by Dr Bhupen Hazarika on 26 April 1965, along with a handful of film lovers, critics, and writers. It was formed three years after the formation of the first film society of North East India "The Shillong Film Society" founded by Padum Barua, Md. Sadullah and some of film enthusiasts. The main objective of the society is to create awareness in the society about cinema as a serious art and to form an environment for serious discourse and debate in the cinematic and intellectual world. Since its inception, the society has been organizing Film Appreciation Courses with experts from the field, publishing books on film and holding workshops on film craft. It is registered under Societies Registration Act XXI of 1860. The current advisers of the club is Harekrishna Deka and Bhuban Chandra Lahkar and the president is A. K. Absar Hazaika.

== Activities ==
The main focuses of the society are:

- To arrange screening of films of national and international repute in every 2nd and 4th Saturday & Sunday of each month at Lakhmiram Barua Sadan, Guwahati.
- To hold Jyotiprasad Agarwala Memorial Lecture once in every year.
- To observe the Foundation Day.
- To publish regularly Chitra Chinta, the annual journal of the society
- To organize ‘Guwahati Film Festival’ from 2008 which was formerly known as ‘Festival of World Cinema’.
- To publish books on films, film personalities and film world.
- To organise short film festivals/shows on special occasion.
- To conduct film shows at different educational institutions and small towns to create awareness among the people.
- Maintain good relations with various Foreign Embassies to arrange exchange programme and screening of films.
- To arrange interaction of audience with renowned filmmakers, directors and film personalities.
- To organise Film Appreciation Course time to time.
- Social activities.

== Publications ==
The society is also publishing books on cinema. Some notable publications are:

- Akira Kurosawa
- Jyotiprasad as a Film Maker
- Living Shadows
- Perspectives on Cinema of Assam
- Chitra Chinta

== Activities ==
- To arrange screening of films of national and international repute in every Saturday & Monday of each week at room no 8 of Teachers-student centre of Jahangirnagar University.
- To held International Film Week in every two year.
- To observe the Foundation Day.
- To organise film festivals/shows on special occasion.
- To conduct film shows at different educational institutions and small towns to create awareness among the people.
- Maintain good relations with various domestic organizations to arrange exchange programme and screening of films.
- To arrange interaction of audience with renowned filmmakers, directors and film personalities.
- To organise Film Appreciation Course time to time.
- Social activities.

== See also ==
- Cinema of Assam
- Jyoti Chitraban Film and Television Institute
