= Parno Mittra =

Indian actress (born 1985)

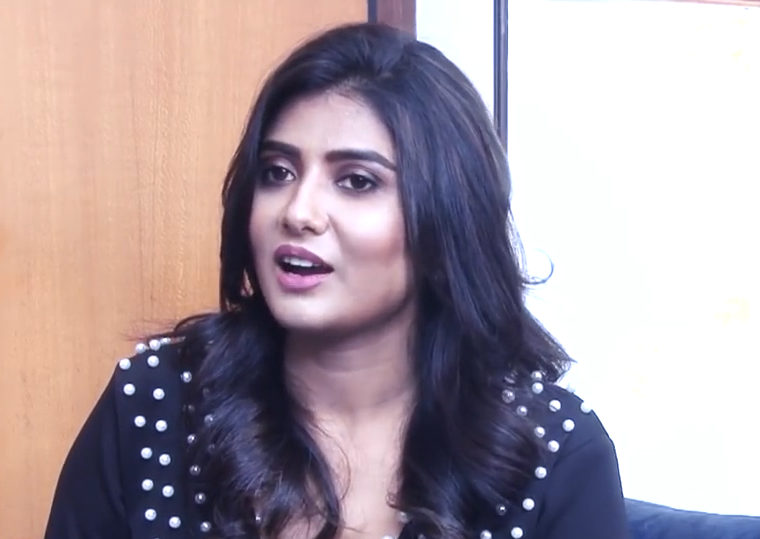
- Parno Mitra in 2017
- Born: 31 October 1985 (age 40); Calcutta, West Bengal, India
- Occupations: Actress; Politician
- Years active: 2007–present
- Notable work: Ranjana Ami Ar Ashbona, Alinagarer Golokdhadha, No Bed of Roses (Doob)
- Political party: Trinamool Congress (2025–present)
- Other political affiliations: Bharatiya Janata Party (2019–2025)

Parno Mittra (born 31 October 1985) is an Indian actress and politician who appears in Bengali films. Mitra started her career on television. Her acting assignment was Ravi Ojha's Bengali TV series Khela (2007). She was catapulted to stardom after she enacted Ranjana in Anjan Dutta's National Award winning Bengali film Ranjana Ami Ar Ashbona (2011).

== Early life ==
Mittra was born in Kolkata. Her father worked in Arunachal Pradesh, and she spent most of her childhood days there. She studied at Dow Hill School in Kurseong, Darjeeling

== Career ==
Mittra's debut TV serial was Khela (2007), a Ravi Ojha production in which she played Indira. She acted in another popular Ravi Ojha production, Mohona, as the lead character. She got the Best Actress award for Mohona. She acted opposite Abir Chatterjee in Shomoy and played the second lead in Bou Kotha Kao.

She made her film debut with Anjan Dutt's Ranjana Ami Ar Ashbona (2011). It received three National Awards for Best Bengali Film, Special Jury Award and Best Music.

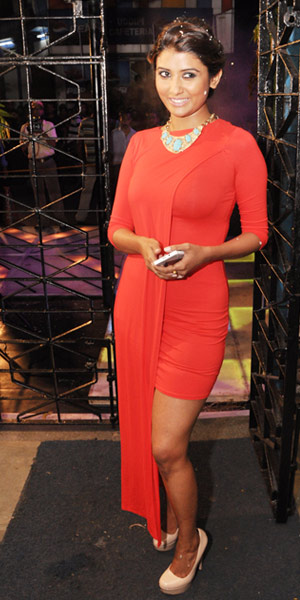
Mittra at the premiere of Aami Aar Amar Girlfriends (2013)

She starred opposite Parambrata Chattopadhyay as Ashima in director Kaushik Ganguly's Apur Panchali, which was screened at the 44th International Film Festival of India (IFFI) in November 2013.

Some of her other notable films are Bedroom, Ami Aar Amar Girlfriends, Maach Mishti More and Ekla Akash. She played a double role in Glamour.

In 2015, she had three releases: Bheetu, Glamour and Srijit Mukherjee's Rajkahini. (Rajkahini is being made in Hindi as Begum Jaan which is being produced by Mahesh and Mukesh Bhatt.) She acted in Pratim D Gupta's X Past Is Present, which featured Rajat Kapoor.

Mittra has signed up for Bangladeshi director Mostafa Sarwar Farooki's bilingual international film featuring Irrfan Khan and Rokeya Prachy of Tareque Masud's The Clay Bird.

In 2018 she played the main role as Brishti in Alinagarer Golokdhadha opposite Anirban Bhattacharya and directed by Sayantan Ghosal.

Her upcoming films include Arindam Sil's Indo-Bangla project Balighawr, and Pratim D Gupta's Ahare Mon.

In November 2025, Parno Mittra was selected as a Clikker Spotlight Creator by Clikker, an editorial series that profiles notable personalities from digital media and entertainment. The feature highlighted her work in Bengali cinema and web series, along with her continuing presence in contemporary creative projects.

The Spotlight article discussed her artistic journey and her approach to performance, noting her engagement with audiences across both traditional and digital platforms. It presented her as one of the prominent modern Bengali artists expanding their influence through diverse creative collaborations.

== Political career ==
Mittra joined Bharatiya Janata Party in 2019. She contested the 2021 West Bengal Legislative Assembly election from Baranagar constituency. She lost the election to Tapas Roy of All India Trinamool Congress by 35,147 votes. Mitra was later criticised by Tathagata Roy who called her Nagarir Nati.

On 26 December 2025, Mittra quit BJP and joined the Trinamool Congress ahead of the 2026 Assembly election.

== Filmography ==
=== Films ===
Key
Denotes films that have not yet been released

Year	Films	Role	Notes	Ref.
2011	Ranjana Ami Ar Ashbona	Ranjana		
2012	Bedroom	Ritika		
2012	Koyekti Meyer Golpo	Molly		
2012	Ekla Akash	Nisha		
2012	Dutta Vs Dutta	Nandita aka Diana		
2013	Maach Mishti & More	Sunaina aka Sunny		
2013	Ami Aar Amar Girlfriends	Rhea		
2014	Apur Panchali	Ashima		
2014	Glamour: No One isInnocent	Mona		
2014	Bheetu: Coward			
2015	Rajkahini	Golaap		
2015	X: Past Is Present	Shiuli		
2016	Shaheb Bibi Golaam	Rumi		
2017	The Bongs Again	Oli		
2017	Doob	Nitu	Indo-Bangladesh movie	
2018	Alinagarer Golokdhadha	Brishti		
2018	Ahare Mon	Suzie Q		
2018	Happy Pill	Rini		
2019	Urojahaj			
2022	Dharmajuddha	Shabnam		
2023	Tarokar Mrittyu			
2023	Pakdondi			
2024	Shesh Rokkha	Troyee		
2024	Bonobibi	Resham		
2025	Bildakini	Hanufa	Indo-Bangladesh movie	
2025	Onko Ki Kothin	Kajol		

=== TV series ===
Year	Title	Role	Director	Ref.
2007	Khela	Indira/Indu	Ravi Ojha	
2007–2008	Mohona	Mohona/ Isha/ Maria	Ravi Ojha	
2009–2012	Bou Kotha Kao	Neera	Ravi Ojha	
2009	Shomoy	Rukmini		
2020–2021	Kora Pakhi	Amon	Leena Gangopadhyay	
2025	Bhog	Damari		

=== Mahalaya ===
Date-Year	Title	Role	Channel
29 September 2008	Mahisasuramardini	Devi Mahisasuramardini and her various avatars	Zee Bangla
