= Pamela Bhutoria =

Indian actress, emcee, model and voiceover artist

- Born: July 31, 1989
- Occupations: Actress, model, emcee
- Years active: 2011–present
- Notable work: Kahaani, Maach Mishti & More, Saheb Biwi Aur Gangster 3, Bapi Bari Jaa

Pamela Bhutoria is an Indian actress, emcee, model and voiceover artist. She has appeared in several Bollywood and Bengali movies and ad campaigns - the latest being Urf Ghanta. She started her acting career with the Bengali movie, Paglu. Top-grossing movies like Kahani, Saheb Biwi Aur Gangster 3, Maach Mishti & More catapulted her to the limelight.

== Filmography ==
Year	Film	Director	Roles(s)	Language
2011	Paglu	Rajiv Kumar Biswas		Bengali
2012	Kahaani	Sujoy Ghosh	Sapna	Hindi
2012	Bapi Bari Jaa	Sudeshna Roy, Abhijit Guha	Tia	Bengali
2013	Maach, Mishti & More	Mainak Bhaumik		Bengali
2014	Taan	Mukul Roy Chowdhury	Lisa	Bengali
2018	Saheb, Biwi Aur Gangster 3	Tigmanshu Dhulia	Deepal	Hindi
2021	Urf Ghanta	Aayush Saxena	Jagmeera	Hindi
2023	Ghuspaith Between Borders	Mihir Pawan Kumar Lath	Manju	

== Career as an emcee and presenter ==
Pamela frequently appears as an emcee in various corporate events. In 2015, she was selected as the host for Bangladesh Premier League alongside Bangladeshi model, Ambrin. She has been the host in Pro Kabaddi League alongside Amitabh Bachchan.

== Appearance in television commercials ==
Pamela has appeared in several TV commercials in India. Before her career as a movie actress, she had appeared in several TV commercials for companies like Vodafone. In recent years, she acted in several ad campaigns for Zomato, Philips, Borosil and other companies.
