= Spandan Banerjee =

Indian independent filmmaker

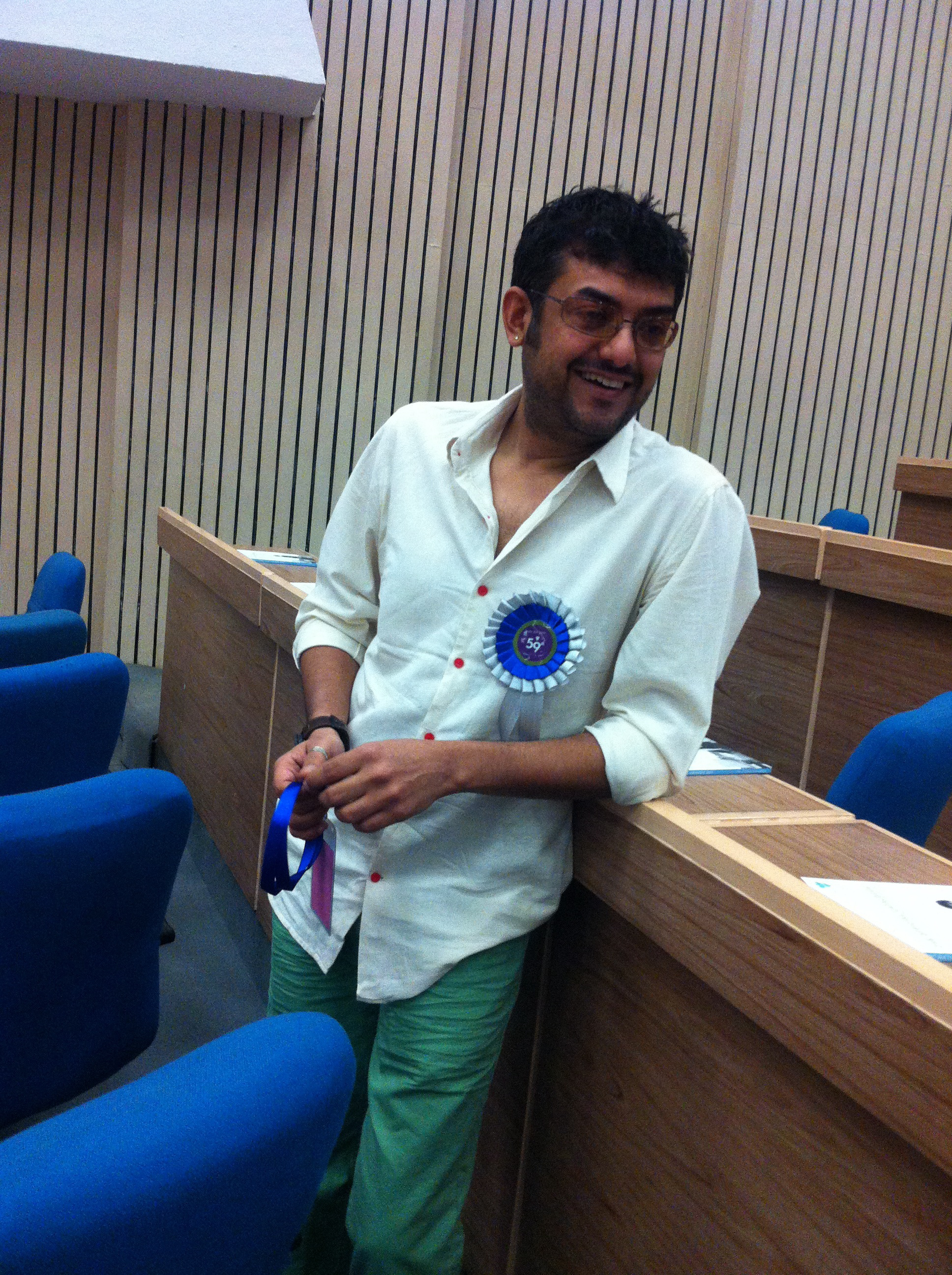
- Born: 2 April 1973 (age 53)
- Education: Bachelor's degree, St Xavier's College, Kolkata
- Occupation: Director/ Filmmaker
- Parent(s): Mr M.K Banerjee and Kabita Banerjee

Spandan Banerjee is an Indian independent filmmaker. He is the Founder of Overdose Films Pvt. Ltd. He was born in Kolkata, and finished his undergraduate studies from St. Xavier's College, Kolkata, India.

== Career ==
His interest in art started early from being a young cartoonist for The Statesman in 1990's Kolkata to designing for the Satyajit Ray Society. He started his advertising career at Response India, Kolkata and subsequently BBDO and McCann, until he quit to make films under the banner of Overdose Films. He was one of the six shortlisted for the British Council Young Creative Entrepreneur Award in the SCREEN category. His other advertising work includes Horlicks, Incredible India, British High Commission, National Geographic Channel Films, Goethe Institute, Pratham, UNICEF and more. He has also directed video clips for the 'Tandanu' album featuring Shankar Mahadevan, Vishal Dadlani, Shubha Mudgal, Indian Ocean, Kumaresh, Grammy Award winner Pandit Vishwamohan Bhatt and Selvaganesh.

His independent films including the National Award-winning You Don't Belong, and To-Let (Best Doc IDSFFK 2013) have been highly acclaimed. His earlier film Beware Dogs (World Premiere IFFR 2008) was one of a kind and one of the first music documentaries from India. His films have a distinct style and language and have often been compared to jazz in its form.

== Filmography ==
Year	Film	Director	Producer	Notes
2006	Track2	Yes	Yes	6 mins. Official Selection: Festival Cine International de Barcelona, 2007
2006	Thekey Pe Kya Kartey Ho?	Yes	Yes	6 mins. Official Selection: VISCULT 2007, Finland, Girona Film Festival 2007, Spain & KARA Film Festival 2007–09, Pakistan
2008	Beware Dogs	Yes	Yes	World Premiere: International Film Festival, Rotterdam 2008. Off. Selection: Festival of International Films on Art (FIFA), Montreal 2008, Barcelona Asian Film Festival (BAFF), Barcelona 2008, Portobello Film Festival, London 2008, MIAAC 2008, New York
2011	You Don't Belong	Yes	Yes	75 mins. "Special Jury" at the 59th National Films Awards, 2012, India; INDIAN PANORAMA at the 42nd International Film Festival of India (IFFI 2011), Goa; Special Jury at the 4th IDSFFK 2011, Kerala. US Premiere: New York Indian Film Festival, NY, 2011. You Don't Belong Film Festival, China 2012
2013	To-Let	Yes	Yes	65 mins. 'Best Long Documentary' at the 6th IDSFFK 2013, Kerala. USA Premiere: New York Indian Film Festival, NY, 2013
2015	City Of Dark	Yes		Fiction Feature (85 mins. under post-production)
2015	English India	Yes		(75 mins/ Doc) WORLD PREMIERE, HOTDOCS Toronto 2015, IDSFFK, Kerala 2015, Long list for nomination Asia Pacific Screen Awards 2015.

== Reception ==
You Don't Belong is a 2011 music documentary that follows a popular 80's Bengali song known as traditional and locates the author of the song. Myth and memory, folk and copyright, home and migration are the larger narratives emerging from the journey of a song from the margins into the urban mainstream.

The song was first popularized during the emergence of Bengali bands interspersing rock and folk to capture contemporary displaced realities. Reproduced and distributed by the flourishing recording industry as representative of the folk traditions of Bengal. Traveling across known and remembered lands, following the unseen path of migration that music takes, You Don't Belong asks some important questions about the encounter between art and mass production, creation and ownership in a country of myriad folk and oral traditions.

The Jury citation of To-Let by IDSFFK states, much like a jazz jam, the film takes us on a journey through the plight of the modern urban nomad in search of a home in a modern-day Delhi. Drawing on a mosaic of all too familiar situations, the director creates a funny and poignant ballad that really grooves.

Rotterdam Film Festival described his 2008 film Beware Dogs as "a poetic and exciting documentary on the contemporary music group Indian Ocean. The film depicts the creative struggle of four musicians who are together on their artistic journey, sharing their inner joy, fears, laughs, thoughts and putting it all in their songs. With a lyrical, rather slow pace, yet in a cinema vérité manner, the film shares with us the excitement and the inner battle of the process of creating music.
