= Carlie Mantilla =

American actress

Carlie Mantilla-Jordan
- Born: May 5, 1989 (age 35); Los Angeles, California, U.S.
- Occupations: actress; writer
- Notable work: The Greatest Beer Run Ever

Carlie Andrea Mantilla-Jordan (born May 5, 1989) is an American actress and writer. She is best known for her work on Angel Falls Christmas, The Greatest Beer Run Ever, The Shinjiro Atae Documentary and Groundswell. She was named the Best Comedian in LA by the Los Angeles Magazine. She is of Mexican descent.

== Biography ==
Mantilla-Jordan began her career performing stand-up comedy at the Hollywood Improv in Los Angeles. She later starred in the musical short Gangsta Waitress, which she co-wrote and which featured Lily Tomlin and Richard Lewis. She is the co-writer and director of the award winning digital series Your Mom Says Hi!. Mantilla wrote the 2021 movie Angel Falls Christmas, in which she played Angelina. The movie was aired on Amazon Prime and was in Netflix top 10 in over 40 countries.

She won the NYC Winter Film Award of Excellence for Best digital series Your Mom Says Hi! in 2018, and was named Best Comedian in Los Angeles by Los Angeles Magazine.

In 2023, Mantilla-Jordan and her husband John Eliot Jordan began co-directing a documentary about Shinjiro Atae, the first J-Pop idol to come out as a gay man. The film is being produced by Fisher Stevens and Peter Farrelly.

== Filmography ==
Year	Title	Type	Role	Credit
2014	Gangsta Waitress	Music video	Gangsta waitress	Writer, Composer, Lead Singer
2015	Time Out with Yes Please!	TV series	Carlie (multiple characters)	Actress
2015	Your Mom Says Hi!	TV series	Carlie	Writer, Director, Actress
2021	Angel Falls Christmas	Film	Angelina	Writer, Actress
2022	The Greatest Beer Run Ever	Film	Protester #3	Actress
2022	Groundswell	Film		Co-writer
