= Ami Aar Amar Girlfriends =

- Directed by: Mainak Bhaumik
- Written by: Mainak Bhaumik
- Screenplay by: Mainak Bhaumik
- Produced by: Aditya Productions and Entertainment
- Starring: Swastika Mukherjee; Parno Mittra; Raima Sen; Vikram Chatterjee; Biswanath Basu; Neel Mukherjee; Anubrata Basu
- Cinematography: Gopi Bhagat
- Edited by: Rick Basu
- Music by: Ankit Aditya; Neel Dutta
- Production companies: Editfx Studios; Dream Digital
- Distributed by: Priya Entertainment
- Release date: 10 May 2013 (Kolkata)
- Running time: 120 minutes
- Country: India
- Language: Bengali

Ami Aar Amar Girlfriends is a 2013 Indian Bengali language film directed by Mainak Bhaumik. The story of the film revolves around the friendship of three Bengali girls, and their world.

== Plot ==
"Ami Aar Amar Girlfriends" is an out of the bracket tale of about three women, who belong to different spheres of the society professionally. The film showcases them having a once in a lifetime trip and sharing their experiences and realizations of life from the dimension in which they have faced it. Previously on numerous occasions the audience has witnessed stories, friendship and bonding among men onscreen, but this is the first opportunity to take a dive inside women's world and the rhythm of their heartbeat.

== Cast ==
- Raima Sen
- Swastika Mukherjee
- Parno Mittra
- Vikram Chatterjee
- Anubrata Basu
- Biswanath Basu

== Theme ==
The story of the film revolves around friendship of three Bengali girls, an academic counsellor, another a radio jockey. Parno Mittra told about the theme of the movie— It was a girls' world. Paro-ninda-paro-charcha was our primary activity on the sets, very characteristic of an all-girl-gang. But we would also drag Mainak into our PNPC sessions.

== Soundtrack ==
Ami Aar Amar Girlfriends

Soundtrack album by Neel Dutt
- Released: 26 April 2013
- Genre: Feature film soundtrack
- Length: 24:49
- Language: Bengali
- Label: Saregama
External audio
- Audio Jukebox on YouTube

Tracklist
No.	Title	Lyrics	Music	Singer(s)	Length
1.	"Me And My Girlfriends"	Ankit Aditya & Sreya Bhattacharya	Ankit Aditya	Sreya Bhattacharya	3:54
2.	"Na Na Shey Phirbey Na Aar"	Anindo Bose	Neel Dutt	Madhubanti Bagchi, Suyasha Sengupta & Reya Kundu	5:18
3.	"Mannequin"	Anindo Bose	Neel Dutt	Madhubanti Bagchi	3:16
4.	"Ichhey Hoy Tai"	Srijato	Neel Dutt	Reya Kundu	4:47
5.	"Keno Hochhey Erokom"	Anindo Bose	Neel Dutt	Suyasha Sengupta	2:51
6.	"Shomoy"	Srijato	Neel Dutt	Ishita Chakravarty	4:43
Total length:					24:49

== See also ==
- All I Want Is Everything
