= Amyt Datta =

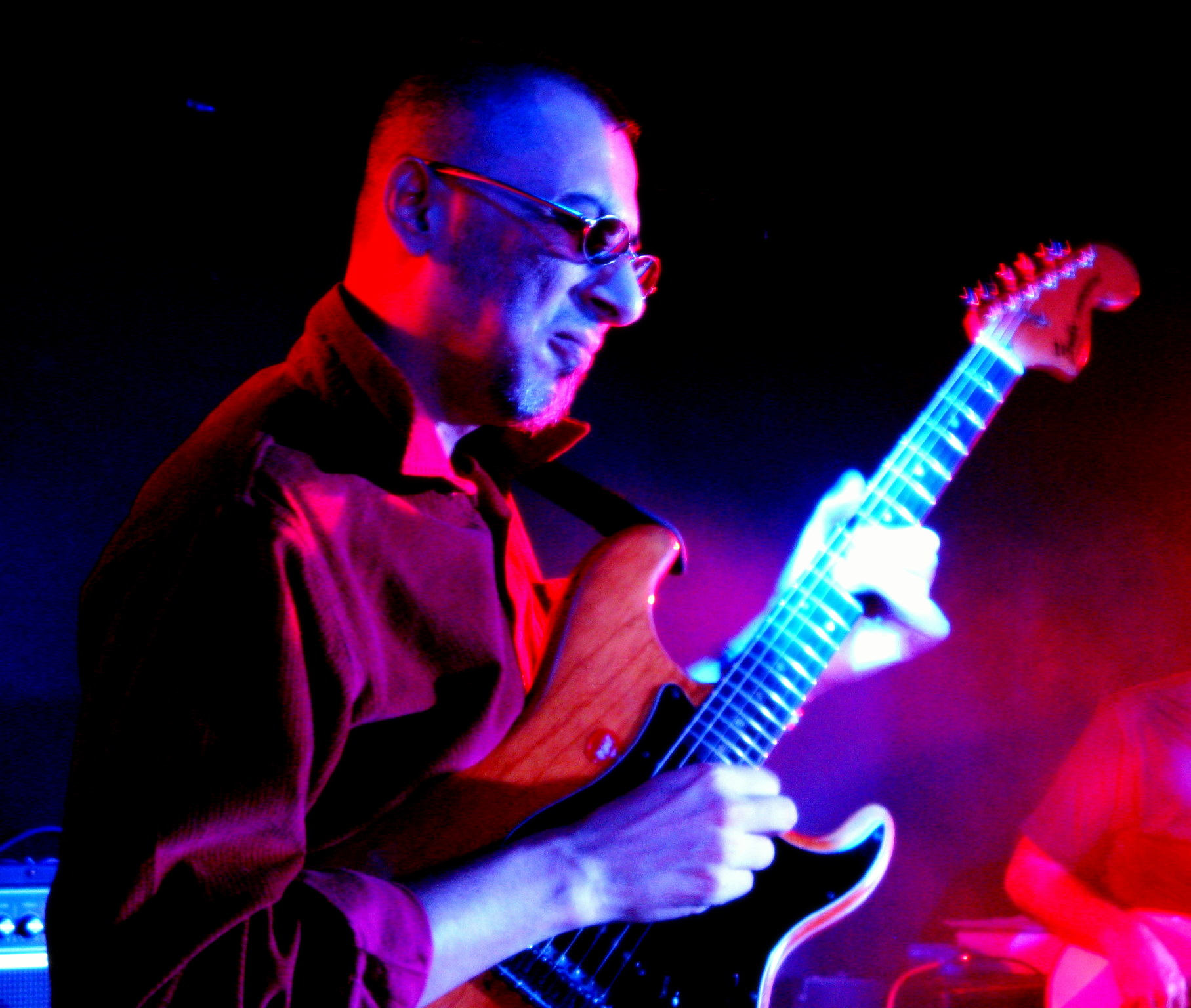
- Amyt Datta in concert with Pinknoise 2009.

Background information
- Born: Amyt Datta; 20 October 1960 (age 66); Kolkata, West Bengal, India
- Genres: Rock, jazz, blues, experimental.
- Occupations: Musician, guitarist, producer, composer
- Instruments: Electric guitar, guitar synthesizer, acoustic guitar, bass, lap steel guitar
- Years active: 1985–present
- Website: https://soundcloud.com/amytdatta

Amyt Datta (born 20 October 1960) is a guitarist, and producer from Kolkata. He toured extensively with the rock band Shiva from the mid-1980s to the early 1990s. He later played with Pinknoise, the late-night alter ego to pop/rock band Skinny Alley in the early 2000s and has continued his own solo work, often in collaboration with Jivraj Singh of Parekh & Singh. His most recent album The Red Plant was released on 10 December 2021.

== Early life ==
His father was an educationist and his mother belonged to a family with a strong musical tradition. Amyt's maternal grandfather Raichand Boral is regarded as the father of Bollywood music.

He and his cousin started playing the guitar when they found a lap steel guitar lying around in their home. They started taking guitar lessons which were mostly in Indian classical and semi-classical music. He started taking western music theory lessons from the legendary Carlton Kitto. His first guitar was what he calls "the Trunk". It was made by his friend who took just Rs. 300 from him. It looked like a log and had a very high action.

== Discography ==
- D for Brother 1992
- Escape the Roar, SKINNY ALLEY, 2003
- Songs from the Moony Boom, SKINNY ALLEY, 2008
- Quirkwork, PINKNOISE, 2009
- PINKFRAUD, PINKNOISE, 2009
- The Dance of the Diaspora, PINKNOISE, 2009–2010
- Electropink, PINKNOISE, 2010
- Ambiance de Danse, solo, 2013
- Pietra Dura, solo, 2016
- Amino Acid, solo, 2016
- Roja Planta, solo, 2021

== Movie career ==
In 2011, Amyt Datta appeared as a guitarist in a Bengali rock musical movie Ranjana Ami Ar Ashbona directed by Anjan Dutt. In 2019, he appeared in If Not for You.
