= Sheetal Vyas =

American film director

- Sheetal Vyas – Austin Film Festival 2010
- Occupation: Producer
- Years active: 1998–present

Sheetal Vyas is an American film producer. She produced her first feature film When Harry Tries to Marry released in the US on 22 April 2011. She also produced the film's soundtrack.

== Early life ==
Vyas originates from Vadodara, Gujarat. She started her career under Sanjana Kapoor at Prithvi Theatre in Mumbai.

== Career in media, marketing and entertainment ==
Sheetal started her career as an Assistant Director on a documentary about Raja Ravi Varma directed by Nandan Khudayadi. It went to win the Indian National Award for Best Documentary. Sheetal joined UTV Television under Zarina Mehta and Ronnie Screwala as the Assistant Producer for many Television shows like Junglee Toofan Tyre Puncture, Kab Kyon Aur Kaha, Positive Health Show.

She then went to work with Channel V India's premium musical channel as an Assistant Producer on Timex Timepass (Winner of Best Television award) hosted by Javed Jaffrey and First Day First Show.

She also worked briefly with Profiles and Projection on an advertising show called Ad Mad. While at Profiles and Projections, she also worked on EPK for two movies – Prakash Jha's Mrityudand and G. P. Sippy's movie

Sheetal Joined Zee TV to work on Zee Cine Awards and Zee Music awards.

She moved to US in 2001 to become Assistant Vice-President of Cinemaya Media Group, then one of the largest South Asian media, entertainment and marketing conglomerates in the US. While at the company, Sheetal produced shows of Indian television programming across genres, oversaw publication of several newspaper titles, and ran Elephant Advertising, an advertising agency, which was one of the top 15 multi-cultural advertising agencies (ranked by Ad-Age).

== Festivals, awards and appearances ==
Sheetal's debut film When Harry Tries to Marry has become a festival darling. It has won Best Audience Award, Best Crossover Film, and Best New Talent at London Asian Film Festival. It also won Best Feature Film (Comedy) at Jersey Shore Film Festival. The film was a marquee screening of the Austin Film Festival, where it had its World Premiere, and its international premiere was at Mumbai Film Festival. The film was an official selection of the Gold Coast International Film Festival.

Sheetal has been a guest speaker at various industry events, and colleges including Ithaca College, and Stonybrook University.

One of her current projects is Billion Dollar Raja, inspired by the true story of the largest insider trading case in US History. She conceptualised the idea and co-wrote the story for the script with Nayan Padrai. The script has been an honoree of the Writer's Guild of America's Feature Access Project, featured by The Black List website, and was selected for the Producer's Guild of America's Power of Diversity Workshop. The project is set up with Ideate Media, with both Sheetal and Nayan attached.

Sheetal is currently co-writing a screenplay based on the true-story of one of French literature's most beloved authors. She is attached as a producer on a film to be shot in India, which will be executive produced by Terrence Malick. Sheetal develops material for film, TV and web as a creative producer and writing-collaborator with a focus on true stories or adaptations of literary properties.

== Filmography ==
- When Harry Tries to Marry (2010)
- Billion Dollar Raja (announced)
