= All I Want Is Everything (film) =

- Promotional poster
- Directed by: Shital Morjaria
- Story by: Shital Morjaria
- Produced by: Jhansi Laxmi; Rekha Pappu
- Starring: See below
- Cinematography: Shyam Prasad Vasili
- Edited by: Shravan Katikaneni
- Music by: Parsa Pahlevan Zade
- Production company: Banayenge Films Production
- Release dates: 8 March 2013 (Hyderabad, India)
- Running time: 62 minutes
- Country: India
- Language: English
- Budget: ₹25 lakh (US$26,000)

All I Want Is Everything is a 2013 Indian English-language film directed by Shital Morjaria, and produced by Jhansi Laxmi & Rekha Pappu. The film's story revolves around the friendship of three urban South Indian girls. This was Morjaria's first film as a director. Sagari Venkata, who played one of the protagonists in the film, also made her acting debut with this film.

Morjaria arranged several workshops and rehearsals before beginning to shoot the original film as she wanted to develop an authentic "chemistry" between the members. In this low-budget film, some of the members contributed their own money to complete its work.

The film was released on 8 March 2013 on International Women's Day and received mixed audience as well as critic reactions. Reviews of the film indicate the lack of resources negatively impacted the audience experience of the story.

== Plot ==
All I Want Is Everything is set in Hyderabad city and revolves around lives and friendship of three girls—Vaijayanthi, Nidhi and Trisha—classmates who share their secrets with each other. Vaijayanthi comes from a Tamil conservative family; Nidhi is from a broken family, raised by a single mother; and Trisha was brought up by a single father.

Vaijayanthi wants to become a filmmaker, but faces challenges realizing this dream from her conservative family as well as from her possessive boyfriend Vivek. Vaijayanthi becomes pregnant, but has an abortion because Vivek abstains from taking responsibility. Trisha is a somnambulist and an isolophobic (fears solitude). She worries about being alone after the death of her single father, and seeks to avoid this by marrying her boyfriend Shashank. Nidhi is a lesbian struggling with her sexuality.

== Cast ==
- Sagari Venkata as Vaijayanthi
- Sampada Harkara as Nidhi
- Iantha Mitchell as Trisha
- Isidore Philips as Prof. Manvi
- Roshan Kanakala as Roshu
- Pradeep as Raidu
- Vani Harkara Nidhi's mother
- Dr. Jayanti Reddy as Vaijayanthi's mother
- Ramachandraiah as Vaijayanthi's father
- Major Shiv Kiran as Trisha's father
- Pramod Sanghi as Vivek

== Production ==
=== Development ===
Actress speaks

The cast and crew honestly was just homecoming because we were just elated to have made the movie. At the Goa screening... Shital was requested for an additional screening, so it was encouraging.

— Sagari Venkata (who played Vaijayanthi's character)
on the cast and crew of the film

All I Want Is Everything was Shital Morjaria's debut film as a director. Prior to her directorial debut, Morjaria worked as a media professional, making a few documentary films on social issues. It took Morjaria almost two years to finish this film. She said in an interview, the producers o the film—Jhansi Laxmi & Rekha Pappu—agreed to finance the project immediately after hearing a brief narration from Morjaria.

The producers came up with several titles for the film related to friendship, but none felt right. The film's title was inspired when Morjaria saw a friend wearing a t-shirt printed with the words "all I want is everything." Morjaria though it was a perfect title for thef film.

=== Production ===
Morjaria scheduled many workshops and rehearsals in order to develop a "chemistry" between the members of the team before shooting. The whole film was shot only in 10 days. The film was originally intended to be 90-minutes, but when released was 62-minutes. Post-production work was lengthy. The budget of the film was ₹2.5 million (US$26,000) and Morjaria and others contributed their own personal funding to complete the film. Due to the budget problem, even at the release of the movie, several members of the production team could not be paid. To help with the production costs, Prasad Film Lab and Ramanaidu Studios of Hyderabad provided discounted digital intermediate work, and the film's cinematographers and editors charged very little for their work on the film.

=== Casting ===
Morjaria met Sagari Venkata through a common nutritionist and gave her the script to read, later offering her a role in the film. Sagari, who played the character Vaijayanthi, initially wanted to play either Trisha's or Nidhi's character. Sagari's co-star Iantha Mitchell, who played Trisha's character, was seeking an opportunity to act in a film, while, Sampada Harkara wished to direct a film. In an interview, Morjaria said that she met Harkara in Facebook and no one else was ready to play Nidhi's role until then.

=== Themes ===
Morjaria felt there were too many films made in Indian film industries on male friendship, and not enough on Indian girls' and women's relationships. This drove her to plan and make a film addressing the societal image of contemporary Indian women. The film also attempts to portray the dreams, fears, aspirations, and joys of contemporary Indian women.

Morjaria hinted in an interview that there were autobiographical elements in the film; for example, she (Morjaria) was a sleepwalker when she was young - much like Trisha's character. She (Morjaria) was also angry, similar to the character Nidhi. According to IBNLive the film was "probably inspired by" 2001 Bollywood film Dil Chahta Hai.

== Release ==
External videos
- Official trailer at Banayenge Film's official channel at YouTube

All I Want Is Everything was released on 8 March 2013, on International Women's day, and received a U/A certificate from the Central Board of Film Certification, India. The film was showcased at the Goa South Asian Film Festival, the Kerala Vibgyor International Film Festival, and the Mumbai Third Eye Film Festival. Morjaria, said, "We were planning for a long while to make this film. It is a fun movie altogether. We truly need the support of the crowds. It's a film that we have made for the sake of friendship with little interest in monetary benefits."

== Reception ==
The film opened to mixed reactions from critics and audiences. IBNLive gave it 1.5 out of 5 stars, while DesiMartini gave it 2.5 stars. The lyrics and music of the film were appreciated. Morjaria's direction also got some appreciation. But, the film's simplicity, along with its general lack of resources were problematic according to critics. IBNLive wrote in their review "Unfortunately, due to the simplicity of the subject, the plot drags making you feel that you are watching a lengthy short-film. Moreover, due to lack of resources, the final output does seem to have the look and feel of a well-made documentary for television."

The Times of India commented in their review that the content of the film was "fresh," but the "product" was a little "rudimentary." In this review, the acting of Iantha Mitchell as Trisha was widely appreciated, while they found the acting of Sagari Venkata and Sampada Harkara as Vaijayanthi and Nidhi "impressive" too.

== See also ==
- Ami Aar Amar Girlfriends
