= List of awards and nominations received by Girish Kasaravalli =

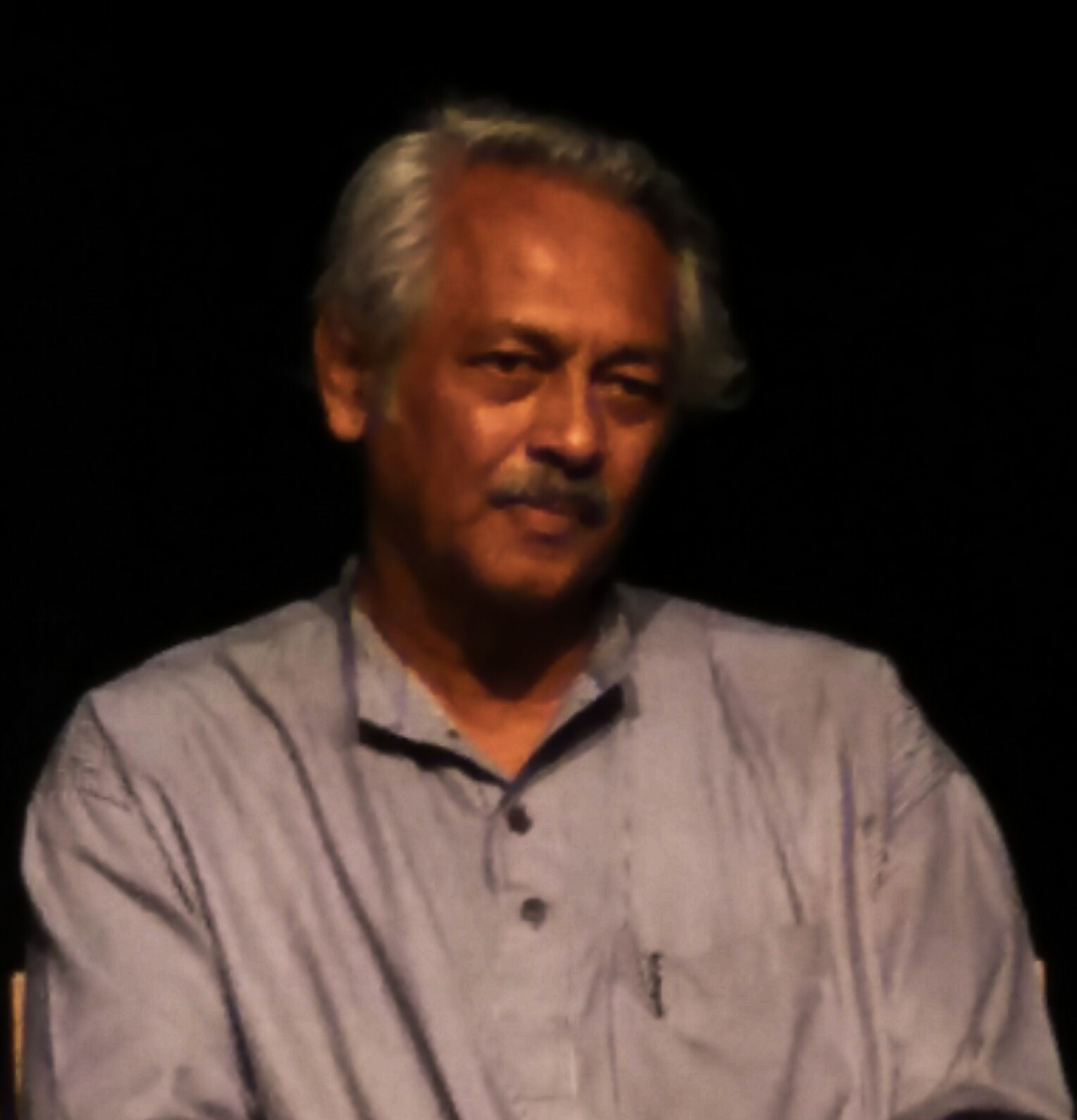
Girish Kasaravalli at BVB on the occasion of screening of Kurmavatara.

The following categories indicate the most prominent film Awards and honours won by Girish Kasaravalli

== National Film Awards ==
National Film Award for Best Feature Film

- 1977: Ghatashraddha
- 1986: Tabarana Kathe
- 1997: Thaayi Saheba
- 2001: Dweepa

National Film Award for Best Experimental Film

- 1975: Avashesh

National Film Award – Special Jury Award / Special Mention (Non-Feature Film)

- 2013: Ananthamurthy – Not A Biography...But A Hypothesis

Best Arts / Cultural Film

- 2020: Naadada Navaneeta Dr PT Venkateshkumar

National Film Award for Best Film on Family Welfare

- 2005: Hasina

National Film Award for Best Screenplay

- 2009: Kanasemba Kudureyaneri

National Film Award for Best Feature Film in Kannada

- 1988: Bannada Vesha
- 1989: Mane
- 1995: Kraurya
- 2007: Gulabi Talkies
- 2009: Kanasemba Kudureyaneri
- 2011: Koormavatara

== International honours ==
- South Asian Cinema Foundation's 'Excellence in Cinema' Crystal Globe Award 2009
- Lifetime Achievement Award at 10th Jaffna International Cinema Festival.

Ghatashraddha - 1977

- The Catholic Jury Award
- Ducats Award at the Manneham Film Festival Germany

Akramana - 1979

- Won the "Moitra award" at the Asian Film Festival at Jakarta, Indonesia
- Was screened at the Asian and Cairo Film Festivals

Dweepa - 2001

- Won Best film at Moscow film festival

Hasina - 2004

- Best Film With a Social Issues at Asia Pacific Film Festival Berlin
- Best Film script and Best film of Human Interest at Barcelona film festival

Naayi Neralu - 2006

- Best Film At KARA International Film Festival, Karachi
- Best Indian Film at Osian's Cinefan Jury award
- Best Indian Film at MAMI International Film Festival Mumbai

Gulabi Talkies - 2007

- Best Indian Film At Osian's Cinefan Festival of Asian & Arab Cinema
- Jury Award at Asian Film Festival, Vesoul
- Best Script at Lavente Film Festival Italy

Kanasemba Kudureyaneri - 2009

- Best Film At Asiatica Filmmediale. Rome
- NETPAC Award at Asiatica Filmediale, Rome
- INALCO Jury Award Asian Film Festival, Vesoul
- Screened at Imagine India Film Festival Madrid

Illiralare Allige Hogalare - 2020

- Director’s Vision Award 2021 at the 18th Indian Film Festival Stuttgart (Germany)
- Best Child Actor at Imagineindia Film Festival, Madrid (Spain)
- Best Film (Critic) At Rome International Film Festival

== Karnataka State Film Awards ==
Ghatashraddha - 1977-78

- Best Film
- Best Director
- Best Script

Mooru Darigalu - 1981-82

- Second Best Film
- Best Director
- Best Script

Tabarana Kathe - 1986-87

- Best Film
- Best Direction

Mane - 1989-90

- Special Jury Award
- Best Script

Kraurya - 1995-96

- Second Best Film

Thaayi Saheba - 1997-98

- Best Film
- Best Director

Dweepa - 2001-02

- Best Film
- Best Director

Hasina - 2004-05

- Best Film On Social Issues

Naayi Neralu - 2005-06

- Best Film
- Best Director

Gulabi Talkies - 2007-08

- Best Film
- Best Director
- Best Script

Koormavatara - 2011

- Second Best Film

Puttanna Kanagal Award - 1997-98

== Filmfare Awards South ==
Thaayi Saheba - 1998

- Best Film
- Best Direction

Dweepa - 2006

- Best Film
- Best Direction

Kanasemba Kudureyaneri - 2009

- Best Direction

== See also ==
- Parallel cinema
