= Shital Morjaria =

Indian journalist and film-maker

- Occupations: Journalist and film-maker
- Notable work: All I Want Is Everything

Shital Morjaria is an Indian journalist and film-maker. Her debut full-length film All I Want Is Everything was released in 2013. Before that she made a few documentary films. She is also the executive producer of TV9. In 2008, she received The Ramnath Goenka Excellence in Journalism award for her show Naveena.

== Career ==
Morjaria started her career as a news presenter of a television show named News Wave. For the next 15 years she worked in other fields of print and visual media. Morjaria was awarded the Ramnath Goenka Award, the highest award in India for journalism, for her program Naveena. The show focused on issues faced by Indian women. In 2013, she made her directorial debut in big screen with the film All I Want Is Everything.

== Works ==
=== Films ===
Year	Film	Actors
2011	All I Want Is Everything	Sagari Venkata, Sampada Harkara, Iantha Mitchell

=== Other works ===
- News Wave (on DD Metro II, as a news reporter)
- Naveena

== Awards ==
- The Ramnath Goenka Excellence in Journalism (2007)
