= Manoj Barpujari =

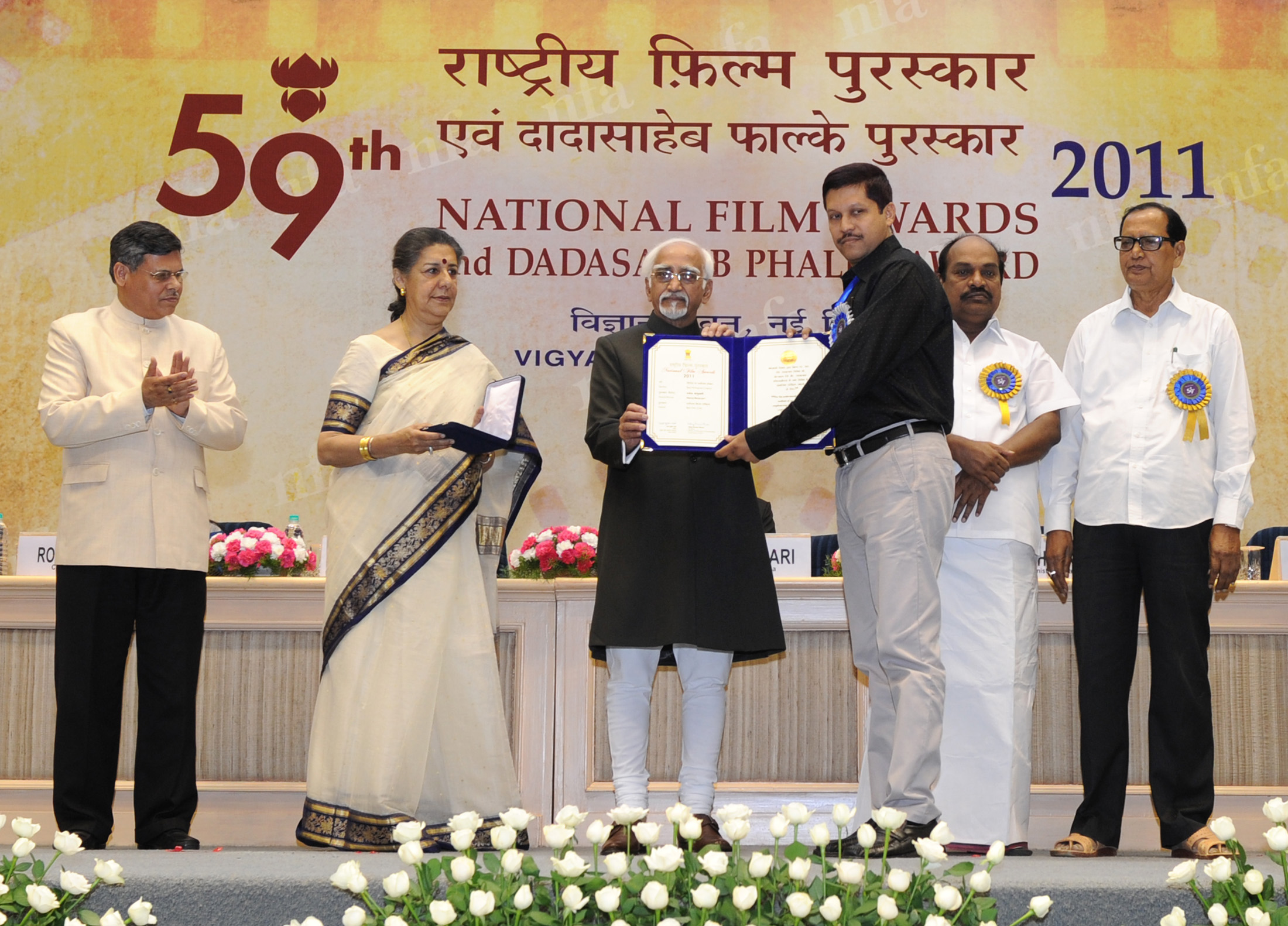
Mohd. Hamid Ansari presenting the Swarna Kamal Award to Shri Manoj Barpujari, for Best Film Critics, at the 59th National Film Awards function, in New Delhi.

Manoj Barpujari, a film critic and a journalist based in Guwahati, received the Swarna Kamal for the best film critic at the National Film Awards (2011). He was a member at a time of three film critics associations in India – FIPRESCI, Film Critics Circle of India (FCCI), and Indian Film Critics Association (IFCA). Representing the Indian chapter of Fipresci mainly, of which he is a member till date, he served as juror at several well known international film festivals including those of Busan, Hong Kong, Port of Spain, Almaty, Dhaka, Kerala, Kolkata, Bengaluru, and Hyderabad. Besides, he covered the Times BFI London Film Festival twice as an accredited journalist (2005 and 2008). He conducted workshops on film criticism at the University of West Indies, St Augustine, Trinidad (2012), Cotton University under the auspices of Indira Gandhi National Centre for the Arts (IGNCA) with Gauhati Cine Club (2023), University of Science and Technology Meghalaya (2023) and J.B. College, Jorhat (2017) etc. He had also presented documentaries from the North-East India at the media and communications department of Goldsmiths College, London (2008). He is an executive member of the India chapter of the international federation of film critics (FIPRESCI) and serves as a member of the editorial board of its web journal E-CineIndia.

== Citation for National Award for Best Film Critic ==
Swarna Kamal "For his understanding of the medium of cinema. His writings can be broadly classified into three areas: (1) Discussion on objective of cinema, (b) The craft of cinema, and (c) Cinema in North-East Indian and Assamese. Barpujari emphasis the significance of craft and promotion of constructive cinema, i.e., cinema which is not only entertainment. He has a social perspective with cinematic and creative sensibility".

== Books ==
Manoj Barpujari has written/edited twenty books including six titles on cinema. He has several research papers on cinema to his credit and has written a chapter in the Routledge Handbook of Indian Cinemas (London, 2013). His travelogue Touching the Trinity is widely acclaimed and has been featured in a column at The Guardian (Trinidad & Tobago) and reviewed in The Telegraph (India). The travelogue was released in Port of Spain in 2012 which was written after he received the Hafeez Karamath Journalism Fellowship in 2010. His travelogue in Assamese titled “Trinidador Dinlipi” won the prestigious Hem Barua Award of Asam Sahitya Sabha in 2017. He is an accomplished Assamese poet and won the Munin Borkotoky Literary Award (2003). Overall, he has eight collections of poetry in Assamese and his poems are translated to various major Indian languages. He took journalism as a noble profession, has a wide range of experiences in print, electronic and web publications. After resigning from a vernacular daily newspaper as its Associate Editor in 2015 he became the founder editor of a quarterly film journal and later handled the responsibility of social media tools of a popular news channel.
