= Guru Dutt: A Tragedy in Three Acts =

1985 book by Arun Khopkar

- Cover of the English edition
- Author: Arun Khopkar
- Original title: Guru Dutt: Teen Anki Shokantika
- Translator: Shanta Gokhale
- Language: Marathi
- Subject: Guru Dutt
- Genre: Film analysis
- Published: 1985
- Publisher: Granthali
- Publication place: India
- English publication date: 15 October 2012
- Media type: Print
- Pages: 134
- OCLC: 569911159

Guru Dutt: A Tragedy in Three Acts is a book by Arun Khopkar, analysing the Indian actor and filmmaker Guru Dutt's work. It was originally released by Granthali in Marathi as Guru Dutt: Teen Anki Shokantika in 1985, and its English version, translated by Shanta Gokhale, was did so Penguin Books on 15 October 2012. The book won the National Film Award for Best Book on Cinema.

== Summary and release ==
Guru Dutt: Teen Anki Shokantika is written by the filmmaker and scholar Arun Khopkar in Marathi, analysing the works from the Indian actor and filmmaker Guru Dutt. According to Khopkar, he never planned the project as a book initially and was his personal jottings where he would write his "intense experience" of Dutt's films, mostly those of the dramas Pyaasa (1957), Kaagaz Ke Phool (1959), and Sahib Bibi Aur Ghulam (1962).^{:7} The book was published by Granthali in 1985, winning the Best Book on Cinema trophy at the 33rd National Film Awards. The awards citations said, "For a book as it is a major critical work on Guru Dutt, which is researched, attractively published at a reasonable price with a wealth of visual which enriches any book on cinema."

The book was re-published by Penguin Books in English under the title of Guru Dutt: A Tragedy in Three Acts on 15 October 2012, translated by his wife Shanta Gokhale. The scholar Shoma Chatterji, in her book The Cinema of Bimal Roy (2017), said: "This is auteur criticism done honestly and over time where the author ... explores the historical context that influence Dutt's deeply melancholic style while also analysing the intricacies of the medium such as acting, lighting, music, editing and rhythm that were carefully deployed to create a masterpiece."^{:25} A Kannada-translated version was published by Karnataka Chalanachitra Academy on 6 February 2017, with the translated was being handled by Uma Kulakarni and Virupaksha Kulakarni. The filmmaker Girish Kasaravalli admitted that the book has made him "to better understand Dutt's melancholy".
