= Baluta =

Baluta may refer to:

- A village in Ponoarele Commune, Mehedinți County, Romania
- Baluta (autobiography), by Data Pawar
- Alexandru Băluță (born 1993), Romanian footballer
- Ihor Baluta (born 1970), Ukrainian politician
- Tudor Băluță (born 1999), Romanian footballer
