= S. Jayachandran Nair =

Indian journalist (1939–2025)

- Born: 1939; Trivandrum, Travancore, India
- Died: 2 January 2025 (aged 85); Bengaluru, Karnataka, India
- Occupations: Journalist, writer, script writer
- Years active: 1957−2012
- Known for: Journalistic achievements
- Notable work: Piravi; Swaham; Ente Pradakshina Vazhikal; Mouna Prathanapole
- Spouse: Saraswathi Amma
- Children: Two children
- Awards: Kerala Sahitya Akademi Award for Biography and Autobiography; National Film Award for Best Book on Cinema; K. Balakrishnan Memorial Award; K. C. Sebastian Award; M. V. Pylee Jornalism Award; K. Vijayaraghavan Smaraka Puraskaram; C. H. Mohammed Koya Journalism Award

S. Jayachandran Nair (1939 – 2 January 2025) was an Indian journalist, writer and screenwriter from the south Indian state of Kerala. He was known for his journalistic activities which included the founding of Samakalika Malayalam Vaarika, a Malayalam language newsweekly and website published by The New Indian Express group as well as for his association with the award winning films, Piravi and Swaham, both directed by Shaji N. Karun. He was the author of a number of literary works in Malayalam for which he received honors such as Kerala Sahitya Akademi Award for Biography and Autobiography, National Film Award for Best Book on Cinema, K. Balakrishnan Award, K. C. Sebastian Award, M. V. Pylee Journalism Award, K. Vijayaraghavan Smaraka Puraskaram and C. H. Mohammed Koya Journalism Award.

== Biography ==
S. Jayachandran Nair was born in 1939 at Sreevaraham, a residential area in Thiruvananthapuram, the capital city of the south Indian state of Kerala. After graduating from the University College Thiruvananthapuram, he joined Kerala Kaumudi as an editorial staff in 1957. Though he moved to Malayalashabdham, a weekly published from Kollam, in 1967, he returned to Kaumudi group and became the associate editor of Kalakaumudi, when the weekly was launched in 1975. Later, he became the editor of the weekly where he served until 1997 and moved to The New Indian Express Group to become the founder editor of Samakalika Malayalam Vaarika, a weekly started by the Group. He worked there till 2012 when he retired from active service.

== Achievements ==
Jayachandran Nair was known to have been instrumental in bringing the literary column, Sahithya Varaphalam, written by M. Krishnan Nair to Kalakaumudi and Samakalika Malayalam Vaarika, when he was serving as the editor of those weeklies. He has written a number of books, covering the genres of biography, literary criticism, cinema, prose and literature. His autobiography, Ente Pradhakshina Vazhikal, won the Kerala Sahitya Akademi Award for Biography and Autobiography in 2012. He was closely associated with the new wave Malayalam cinema and he entered the field in 1989, by producing the debut film of Shaji N. Karun, Piravi for which he also wrote the story. The film went on to win a number of awards, including the Caméra d'Or — Mention Spéciale at the 1989 Cannes Film Festival and the National Film Award for Best Feature Film. Later, in 1989. he wrote the screenplay for another Shaji N. Karun venture, the award winning movie, Swaham. He published a work on the filmmaker G. Aravindan under the title, Mounaprararthana Pole in 2018 which won the National Film Award for Best Book on Cinema in 2018. His career came to an end in 2012, following a controversy involving his decision to stop publishing a poem written by Prabha Varma in his weekly. This is known to have caused a friction between him and the owners of the publication.

== Personal life and death ==
Nair was married to Saraswathi Amma and the couple had a son, Jaydeep, and a daughter, Deepa.

Nair died from age-related illnesses in Bengaluru, on 2 January 2025, at the age of 85.

== Awards ==
- Kerala Sahitya Akademi Award for Biography and Autobiography
- National Film Award for Best Book on Cinema
- K. Balakrishnan Memorial Award
- K. C. Sebastian Award
- M. V. Pylee Journalism Award
- K. Vijayaraghavan Smaraka Puraskaram
- C. H. Mohammed Koya Journalism Award

== Books ==
- Jayachandran Nair, S. (2011). Therolikal. Kozhikode: Olive.
- Jayachandran Nair, S. (2012). Rosadalangal (2nd ed.). Kozhikode: Mathrubhumi Books. ISBN 978-81-8265-387-0.
- Jayachandran Nair, S. (2013). Kazhchayude Satyam: Cinema Niroopanam. Thiruvananthapuram: Sign Books.
- Jayachandran Nair, S. (2013). Kazhchayude satyam. Thiruvananthapuram: Sign Books. ISBN 978-81-926086-3-1.
- JAYACHANDRAN NAIR, S. (2014). GABRIEL GARCIA MARQUEZ: Jeevithavum Ezhuthum. Kochi: Prism.
- Jayachandran Nair, S. (2015). Godsekkum prathima. TVPM: Chintha.
- Jayachandran Nair, S. (2015). Nizhal veezhaatha veilthundukal. Thrissur: Current Books. ISBN 978-81-226-1302-5.
- Jayachandran Nair, S. (2015). Ilakal kozhiyatha marangal. Kozhikode: Mathrubhumi Books. ISBN 978-81-8266-565-1.
- Jayachandran Nair, S.; ജയചന്ദ്രൻനായർ, എസ് (2016). Andre Tarkovsky: Life and Work. Kannur: Kairali books private limited. ISBN 978-93-86197-44-3.
- JAYACHANDRAN NAIR, S. (2017). Bakkipathram. Thrissur: Green Books Pvt. Ltd.
- Jayachandran Nair, S. (2018). Swathanthryathinu 21 Divasam. Kannur: Kairali books private limited. ISBN 978-93-86822-90-1.
- JAYACHANDRAN NAIR, S. (2019). Marakkuthira. Thrissur: Green books. ISBN 978-93-88830-32-4.

== See also ==
- Kesari Balakrishna Pillai
- Sukumar Azhikode
- Babu Bharadwaj
- V. K. Madhavan Kutty
