= Ravindra Laxman Thatte =

Indian plastic surgeon (born 1939)

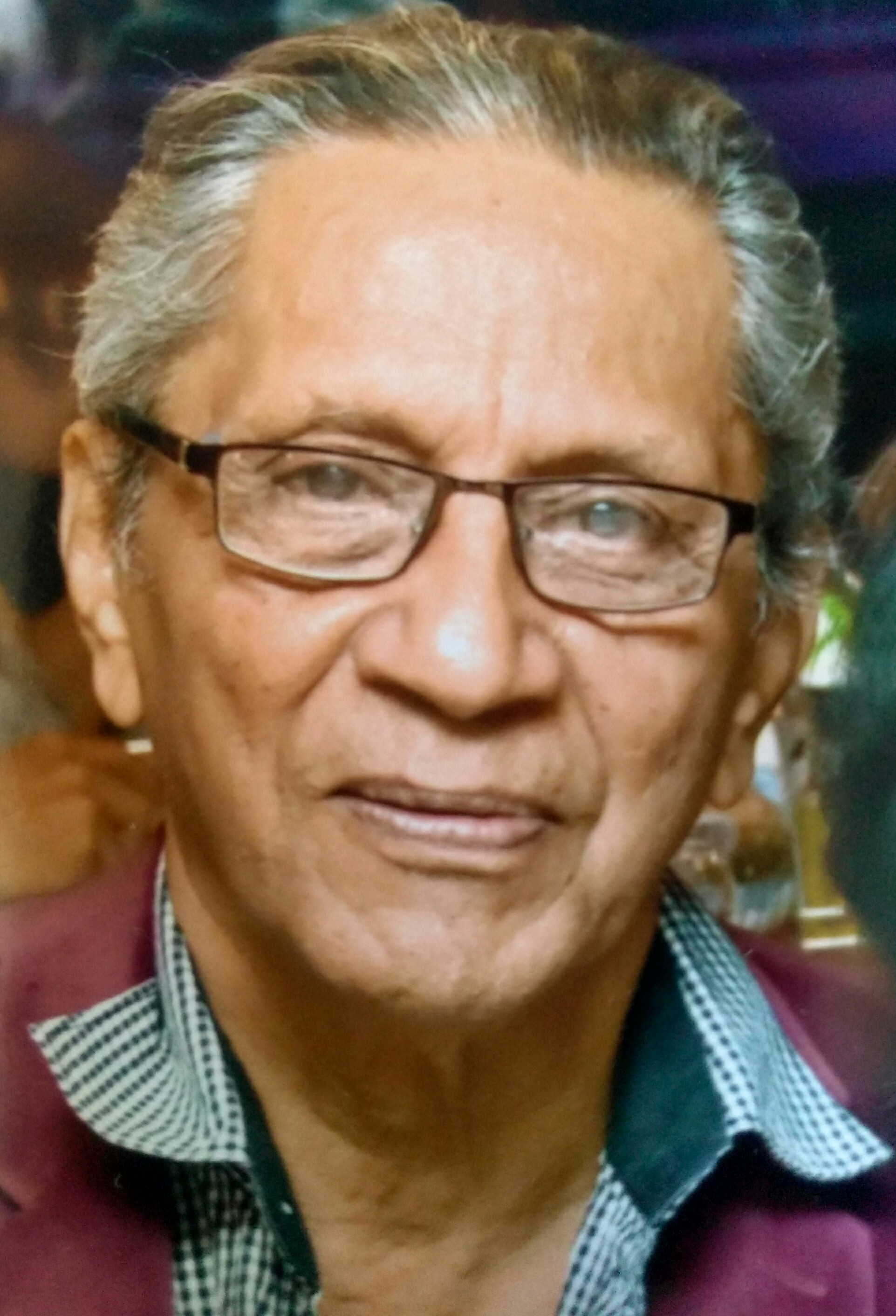
- Born: 1 June 1939 (age 86)
- Occupations: plastic and reconstructive surgeon

Dr. Ravin Laxman Thatte is a doyen a professor in the field of plastic and reconstructive surgery, a teacher to most plastic surgeons in India, an Indian philosopher, and an active environmentalist.

== Early life and education ==
Thatte's father Laxman was a surgeon in the Indian Medical Service and his mother, Kusum Maydeo, was a social worker and short story writer. He studied in several schools in the state of Maharashtra, passed his intermediate science examination from the Willingdon College, Sangli and completed M.B.B.S, and M.S. (Mumbai University) from Topiwala National Medical College, Mumbai.

== Professional career ==
Thatte trained in plastic and reconstructive surgery in Mumbai at the King Edward Memorial Hospital and later in the United States at the Cook County Hospital in Chicago, the Straith Hospital and Wayne State University School of Medicine in Detroit Medical Center. He received Fellowship of the Royal Colleges of Surgeons, Edinburgh, Ad hominem and was the first Asian to receive this honor. He had earlier delivered the eponymous Graham Lecture of the same college in April 1991. He worked in Lokmanya Tilak Municipal General Hospital, Mumbai, as Hon. Prof. of Plastic Surgery from 1984 till 1998 till his retirement. Thatte is a visiting Lecturer in Massachusetts General Hospital (Harvard University) and Royal Orthopaedic Hospital.

== Professional contribution ==
Thatte's work on a ‘one stage cover after de-epithelialization for wounds of the leg’ was simple and considered useful for the developing world. He treated cleft lip and cleft palate in children and presented papers in International conferences in Southeast Asia and Australia. Replicating the cardiopulmonary bypass principle on a free flap, Thatte showed that it survives just with an intact large vein without any supply from an artery. This work was corroborated at the department of hydraulics at the Indian Institute of Technology Bombay on a computer model and Radioactive tracer dye studies. His editorials, research papers, letters, and essays were published in International journals. He was also invited to contribute to the Grabb's Encyclopedia of Flaps. Thatte directed Smile Train Project at the Godrej Hospital in Mumbai offering free treatment of cleft lip and cleft palate patients at birth. He established a plastic surgery service in a rural hospital on the west coast of India. On behalf of the Association of Plastic Surgeons of India, Thatte writes a blog, attracting a large worldwide viewership.

== Philosopher ==
Thatte gravitated to Indian philosophy, his main interest being its rational and scientific content and wrote his first book in 1994. He undertook an in-depth exploration of Dnyaneshwari and accomplished an English transcreation of the verses written in an ancient Marathi language. Thatte wrote columns in Loksatta and Maharashtra Times on the significance of India's ancient literature in the context of modern discoveries. He addressed the 3rd International conference on Vedas (Vedavidnyan) at the Deccan College Post-Graduate and Research Institute in Pune in 2018.

== Environmental work ==
Thatte was a founder-trustee of “Swacchata Nyas”, a trust created to improve the environment in hospitals of Brihanmumbai Municipal Corporation. Thatte fought to protect a Public plot reserved for a garden which was being usurped for a parking lot by a Multinational corporation with the help of a local neighborhood association, Thatte cleaned up and maintained a beach at Mahim, Mumbai. He adopted a zero waste system through recycling and composting of waste in his residential society to win an award from Brihanmumbai Municipal Corporation, India.

== Memberships/scholarships ==
- Honorary membership of the British Association of Aesthetic Plastic Surgeons.
- Honorary membership of the Association of Plastic Surgeons of Malaysia.
- Scholarship under Fulbright program at the University of Alabama School of Medicine.

== Awards ==
- Hari Om Ashram Rangachari award of the Association of Surgeons of India.
- Sangham Lal Award and oration of the All India Institute of Medical Sciences, Delhi.
- Eric Peet medal and lecture at the Association of Plastic Surgeons of India.
- Sushruta prize and lecture at the Association of Plastic Surgeons of India.
- Lifetime Achievement Award of the Association of Plastic Surgeons of India.
- M.V.Sant award and lecture of the B.Y.L. Nair Charitable Hospital, Mumbai, India.
- Plastic surgeon of the year award of the Association of Plastic Surgeons of the year, 2016. ((19))
- Maharashtra state award in literature for his book Mi Hindu Zalo.

== Books ==
- Mi Hindu Zalo, Granthali Prakashan (1994)
- Janeev (Part 1), Keshav Bhikaji Dhavale Prakashan (1994)
- Manus Navache Jagane, Granthali Prakashan (1998)
- The philosophy of the Geeta and the verse of Dnyaneshwar, Granthali Prakashan (2000)
- (Vi) Dnyaneshwari, Keshav Bhikaji Dhawale Publications (2005)
- The Genius of Dnyaneshwar, Published by Walawalkar Hospital (2007)
- Vishwa he Mohare Lavave, a travelogue published by Walawalkar Hospital (2009)
- Discovering a Galaxy en route to Derwan - A Travelogue, Walawalkar Hospital (2009)
- Dnyaneshwari Obad Dhobad (Part 1), Keshav Bhikaji Dhavale Prakashan (2010)
- Janeev (Part 2), Keshav Bhikaji Dhavale Prakashan (2011)
- A Miraculous Rendering on the Bhagwat Geeta by Dnyaneshwar, Shree Publishers (2012)
- Dnyaneshwari Obad Dhobad (Part 2), Keshav Bhikaji Dhavale Prakashan (2012)
- Je Dekhe Ravi, Navachaitanya Prakashan (2014)
- Prapanchache Dnyan Tech Vidnyan, Granthali Prakashan (2015)
