= National Film Award for Best Book on Cinema =

Indian film award

- National award for contributions to Best Writing on Indian Cinema
- Sponsored by: Directorate of Film Festivals
- Rewards: Swarna Kamal (Golden Lotus); ₹50,000 (US$530)
- First award: 1981
- Most recent winner: Kishore Kumar: The Ultimate Biography (2023)

The National Film Award for Best Book on Cinema is one of the National Film Awards presented annually by the Directorate of Film Festivals, the organisation set up by Ministry of Information and Broadcasting, India. It is one of several awards presented for Best Writing on Indian Cinema and awarded with Swarna Kamal (Golden Lotus).

The award was instituted in 1981, at 29th National Film Awards and awarded annually for books written in the year across the country, in all Indian languages.

== Winners ==
Award includes 'Swarna Kamal' (Golden Lotus) and cash prize. Following are the award winners over the years:

Awards legends
Indicates a joint award for the year

List of books, showing the year (award ceremony), language(s), author(s) and publisher(s)
Year	Book(s)	Language(s)	Author(s)	Publisher(s)	Refs.
1981 (29th)	Thamizh Cinemavin Kathai	Tamil	Aranthai Narayanan	–	
1982 (30th)	Chalachitra Sameeksha	Malayalam	Vijayakrishnan	–	
1983 (31st)	Cinemayude Lokam	Malayalam	Adoor Gopalakrishnan	–	
1984 (32nd)	Chalachitrer Abirbhab	Bengali	Jagannath Chathopadhyay	–	
1985 (33rd)	Guru Dutt: Teen Anki Shokantika	Marathi	Arun Khopkar	–	
1986 (34th)	Rabindranath O Chalachithra	Bengali	Arun Kumar Roy	–	
1987 (35th)	Kazhchayude Asanthi (Torments of Seeing)	Malayalam	V. Rajakrishnan	–	
1988 (36th)	The Moving Image	English	Kishore Vallicha	Orient Longman	
1989 (37th)	Shataranj Ke Khiladi	Hindi	Surendranath Tiwari	Madhya Pradesh Film Development Corporation	
1989 (37th)	Cinema, Kannakkum Kavithayum	Malayalam	Sreekumaran Thampi	Sahithya Pravarthaka	
1990 (38th)	Hindi Cinema Ka Itihaas	Hindi	Manmohan Chadhha	Sachin Prakashan	
1991 (39th)	Athmanindayude Pookal (Flowers of Self-Condemnation)	Malayalam	Aravindan Vallachira	V. R. Pushpakaran	
1992 (40th)	Awara	English	Gayatri Chatterjee	Wiley Eastern Ltd	
1993 (41st)	Naalo Nenu	Telugu	Bhanumathi Ramakrishna	K. N. T. Sastry	
1994 (42nd)	Abhinayam Anubhavam	Malayalam	Bharath Gopi	P. Bhuvanesan	
1995 (43rd)	Marathi Cinema: In Retrospect	English	Sanjit Narwekar	Govind Swarup	
1996 (44th)	The Eye of the Serpent	English	S. Theodore Baskaran	East West Books Pvt. Ltd.	
1997 (45th)	Cinemachi Goshta	Marathi	Anil Jhankar	Rajhans Prakashan	
1997 (45th)	Hindi Cinema Aur Delhi	Hindi	Savita Bhakhri and Adithya Aswathi	Praveen Prakashan	
1998 (46th)	Cinemaee Bhasha Aur Hindi Samvadon Ka Vishleshan	Hindi	Kishore Vaswani	Hindi Book Centre	
1999 (47th)	Malayala Cinemayum Sahithyavum	Malayalam	Madhu Eravankara	D. C. Books	
1999 (47th)	Marathi Chitrapat Sangeetachi Vatchal	Marathi	Aruna Anant Damle	Anil Damle	
2000 (48th)	Sholay: The Making of a Classic	English	Anupama Chopra	Penguin Books	
2001 (49th)	Asoumiya Chalachitrar Chaa-Pohar	Assamese	Apurba Sarma	Jnan Pujari	
2001 (49th)	Moulik Marathi Chitrageete	Marathi	Gangadhar Mahambare	Rajiv D. Barve	
2002 (50th)	Paroma and other Outsiders: The Cinema of Aparna Sen	English	Shoma Chatterjee	Parumita Publications	
2002 (50th)	Ritu Aaye Ritu Jaaye	Hindi	Sarat Dutt	Saaransh Publications	
2003 (51st)	Filmi Jagat Mein Ardhashakti Ka Romanch	Hindi	Bharatiya Jnanpith	Ramakrishna	
2004 (52nd)	Stardust: Vignettes from the Fringes of Film Industry	English	Roopa Swaminathan	Penguin Books	
2005 (53rd)	Kundan	Hindi	Saransh Prakashan	Sharad Dutt	
2006 (54th)	Helen: The Life and Times of an H-Bomb	English	Jerry Pinto	Penguin Books	
2007 (55th)	From Raj to Swaraj: The Non-fiction Film in India	English	B. D. Garga	Penguin Books	
2008 (56th)	Bollywood Melodies	English	Ganesh Anantharaman	Penguin Books	
2009 (57th)	Cinemaa Yaana	Kannada	K. Puttaswamy	Hasiru Prakashana	
2010 (58th)	From Rajahs and Yogis to Gandhi and Beyond: Images of India in International Films of the Twentieth Century	English	Vijaya Mulay	Seagull Books	
2011 (59th)	R. D. Burman: The Man The Music	English	Anirudha Bhattacharjee and Balaji Vittal	HarperCollins India	
2012 (60th)	Silent Cinema in India - A Pictorial Journey	English	B. D. Garga	HarperCollins India	
2013 (61st)	Cinema Ga Cinema	Telugu	Nandagopal	Praga India	
2014 (62nd)	Silent Cinema (1895–1930)	English and Telugu	Pasupuleti Purnachandra Rao	Emesco Books	
2015 (63rd)	Dr. Rajkumar Samagra Charitre	Kannada	Doddahullur Rukkoji	Preethi Prakashana	
2016 (64th)	Lata: Sur Gatha	Hindi	Yatindra Mishra	Vani Prakashan	
2017 (65th)	Matmagi Manipur: The first Manipuri Feature Film	Manipuri	Bobby Wahengbam	Angomningthou Preservation and Documentation	
2018 (66th)	Mouna Prathanapole	Malayalam	S. Jayachandran Nair	Kerala State Chalachitra Academy	
2019 (67th)	A Gandhian Affair: India's Curious Portrayal of Love in Cinema	English	Sanjay Suri	HarperCollins India	
2020 (68th)	The Longest Kiss: The Life and Times of Devika Rani	English	Kishwar Desai	Westland Publications	
2021 (69th)	Music by Laxmikant Pyarelal: The Incredibly Melodious Journey	English	Rajiv Vijayakar	Rupa Publications	
2022 (70th)	Kishore Kumar: The Ultimate Biography	English	Anirudha Bhattacharjee and Parthiv Dhar	HarperCollins India	
2023 (71st)	No Award				
