= Vayu Naidu =

Vayu Naidu (born 1957) is a British Indian storyteller, performer and writer. The author of Sita's Ascent and Under the Banyam, she is credited with coining the term 'performance storytelling'.

== Life ==
At the age of 27 Naidu was in an accident which left her without speech. She recovered her speech, which she needed for theatre, through storytelling.

In 1994 she received a PhD in oral tradition as performance from the University of Leeds.

In her 1996-7 production Kathasuniascea, she used music and movement to retell traditional stories from India, Nigeria and Ireland. Parting Company (1997) was a collaboration with composer Judith Weir, a celebration of Indian and European mythologies marking fifty years since Indian independence. Future' Perfect (2000) was another collaboration with Weir for the Birmingham Contemporary Music Group.

Naidu moved to Canterbury in 2000. She was awarded an AHRB fellowship from the University of Kent for a project entitled The Presence of Absences: Exploring Technique and Manifestation in the Contemporary Performance Storyteller.

Her novel Sita's Ascent is a retelling of the epic Ramayana.

In 2019 Naidu accepted an International Excellence award at London Book Fair on behalf of children's books company Tulika Publishers. She has published several collections of stories for children, which have also been used in the Channel 4 animation Biswas. She has also narrated several audiobooks by Kishwar Desai.

== Works ==
=== Books ===
- The empty vessel: storytelling and the healing arc of narrative. London: Jessica Kingsley publishers.
- Stories from India. Hove: Wayland, 2000. Illustrated by Rebecca Gryspeerdt.
- Traditional Stories from India, 2006. London: Hodder Wayland, 2006. Illustrated by Rebecca Gryspeerdt.
- Sita's ascent. New Delhi; New York: Penguin Books.
- The sari of Surya Vilas South Melbourne, Victoria: Affirm Press, 2017.

=== Audiobooks ===
- (narrator) Witness the Night by Kishwar Desai. 2010.
- (narrator) The sea of innocence by Kishwar Desai. 2014
- (narrator, with Penelope Rawlins, Sam Dastor and Lyndam Gregory) Origins of love by Kishwar Desai. 2014.
