= Shanta Gokhale =

Indian writer, translator, journalist and theatre critic

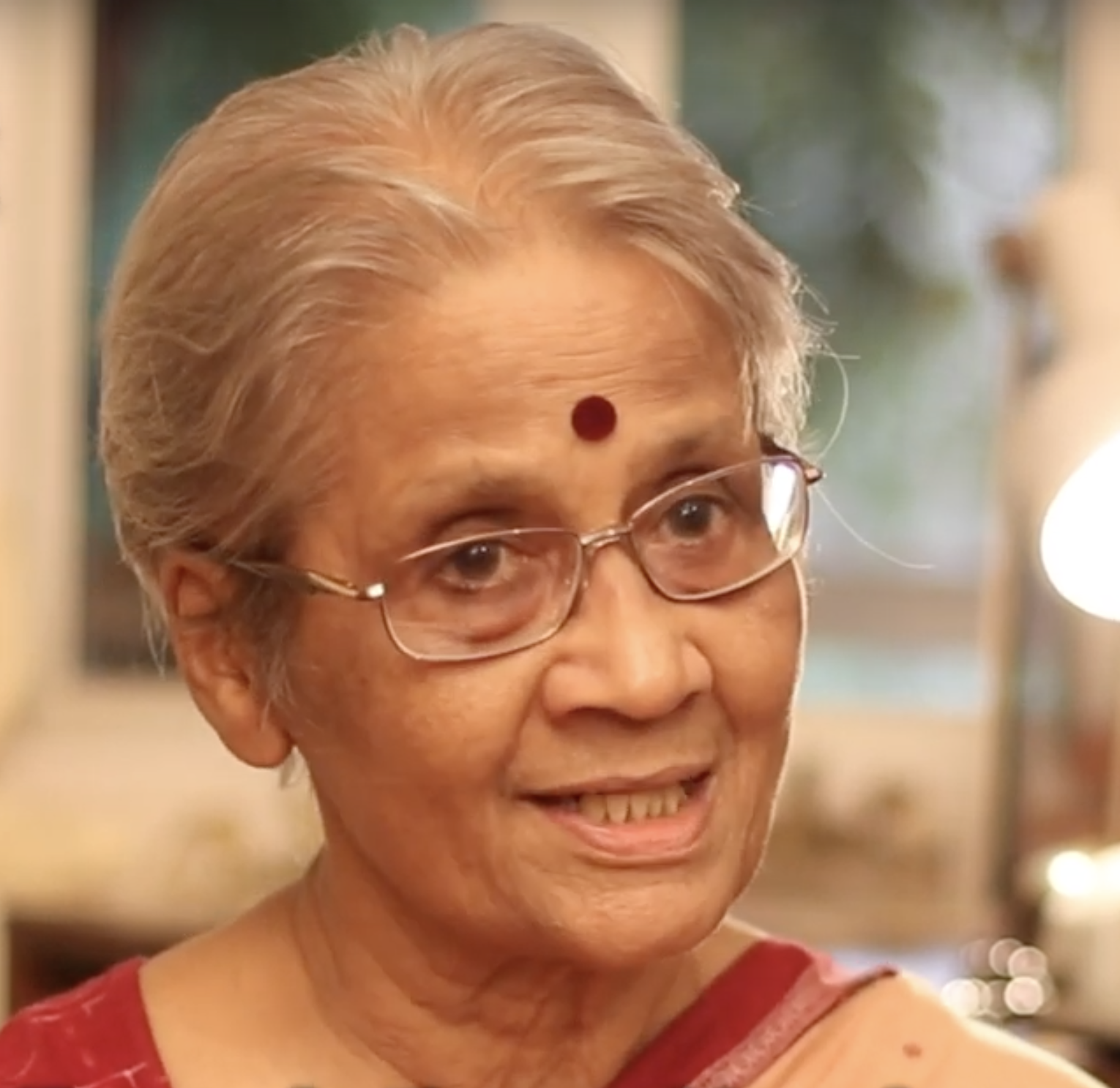
- Gokhale in 2019
- Born: 14 August 1939 (age 87); Dahanu, Bombay Presidency, British India
- Occupations: Writer; translator; journalist; theatre critic; playwright
- Spouses: Vijaykumar Shahane; Arun Khopkar
- Children: Girish Shahane; Renuka Shahane
- Writing career
- Notable works: Rita Welinkar; Tya Varshi (Crowfall)
- Website: shantagokhale.com

Shanta Gokhale (born 14 August 1939) is an Indian writer, translator, journalist and theatre critic. She is best known for her works Rita Welinkar and Tya Varshi.

== Early life and education ==
Born in Dahanu in Palghar district of Maharashtra, Gokhale's family moved to Shivaji Park neighbourhood in Mumbai in 1941 when her father, GG Gokahle, joined a newspaper, Searchlight. Her father later joined the Bennett and Coleman Group. She did her schooling from Bombay Scottish School, Mahim. At the age of 15 she left for England where she did her B. A. (Hons) in English literature at Bristol University. Returning to India, at the age of 21, she did her M. A. (Hons) degree in English literature from University of Mumbai. Subsequently, she joined Xavier's Institute of Communication, Mumbai, where she studied Communications and Video Production.

== Career ==
Shanta Gokhale has previously worked as a part-time teacher at Elphinstone College, and as a public relations executive at Glaxo Laboratories.

=== Writing and journalism ===
Gokhale initially published stories, in both English and Marathi, in various publications, and eventually in the 1970s, she started publishing novels. She published her first book, Rita Welinkar, in Marathi (and later in English in the year 1995). She credits a letter from Nissim Ezekiel for encouraging her to write in Marathi. She wrote the book while she still worked at Glaxo, formulating the ideas during her bus journeys and writing during her lunch breaks. Her second book, Tya Varshi, was published seventeen years later, in 2008. It was later translated and published by her in English as Crowfall, in 2013. In 2018, she released an anthology of her writings over the decades, titled The Engaged Observer, which was edited by her close friend, Jerry Pinto. She planned to release her memoirs with the tentative title of Here’s Looking at You, Body in 2018. It was later released as One Foot On The Ground: A Life Told Through The Body in 2019. In March 2020, she released Shivaji Park: Dadar 28: History, Places, People, a book that traced the history of the Mumbai neighbourhood where she lives.

She has written screenplays for several films and documentaries. She wrote the screenplay for the Hindi film, Haathi Ka Anda (2002) directed by Arun Khopkar for whom she has written many documentary scripts. She wrote the screenplay for the 2011 Marathi film, Ti Ani Itar, adapted from Manjula Padmanabhan’s 1986 play, Lights Out. As an actor, she appeared in the parallel cinema classic, film, Ardh Satya (1983), directed by Govind Nihalani, and in a 13-part TV series directed by Amol Palekar.

Her daughter, Renuka Shahane, made her directorial debut adapting Gokhale's novel Rita Welinkar into a Marathi film, Rita (2009). It featured her (Shahane), Pallavi Joshi and Jackie Shroff in the cast.

Gokhale has formerly been Arts Editor with The Times of India, Mumbai, and Sub-Editor at Femina. Hard-nosed journalism wasn't meant for her, as she didn't like to intrude on people's privacy or push for attention. She has previously been a columnist for newspapers like The Sunday Times of India and The Independent, for tabloids like Mid-Day and Mumbai Mirror and for websites like Scroll.in.

=== Theatre and its criticism ===
Gokhale's journey into theatre began with her study of English literature and theatre, as part of her studies in London. Soon after returning to Bombay, she happened to become good friends with Satyadev Dubey. She would attend his theatre rehearsals and observe him directing plays, some of which were written by fresh new writers like Girish Karnad. This began her journey into understanding the processes of theatre making. Later, she started writing plays like Avinash in 1988 (which was directed by Dubey), Dip and Dop and Rosemary for Remembrance (which was premiered at the Kala Ghoda Arts Festival in 2016). In 2000, she published a critical study of Marathi theatre, Playwright at the Centre: Marathi Drama from 1843 to the Present. She has also edited The Scenes We Made: An Oral History of Experimental Theatre in Mumbai. She has edited the book, The Scenes We Made, about the theatre scene Between the mid-70s and early 90s at the Chabildas School in Dadar, Mumbai. The book was released in 2015.

=== Translation ===
As a translator she has worked on veteran actress Durga Khote's noted autobiography and has published translations of several plays by leading Marathi playwrights like Mahesh Elkunchwar, Vijay Tendulkar, G.P. Deshpande, and Satish Alekar. She credits her mother for inspiring her to translate the wealth of Marathi literature. Her work in translation began with C.T. Khanolkar’s play Avadhya, at the suggestion of her friend Satyadev Dubey while she was living in Visakhapatnam. Some of her other translations include Em Ani Hoomrao (Jerry Pinto's novel, Em And The Big Hoom translated into Marathi), Begum Barve (Satish Alekar's Marathi play of the same name, translated into English), I, Durga Khote (Durga Khote's autobiography in Marathi, translated into English) and Guru Dutt: A Tragedy in Three Acts (her ex-husband Arun Khopkar's Marathi book on Guru Dutt, titled Guru Dutt: Teen Anki Shokantika, translated into English). In 2018, she published Smritichitre: The Memoirs of a Spirited Wife, translated from the original Marathi version published by Lakshmibai Tilak in four parts between 1931 and 1936.

== Works ==
Novels

- "The Theatre of Veenapani Chawla. Theory, Practice, Performance", Publisher: Oxford University Press, New Delhi 2014. ISBN 978-0-19-809703-7.
- Shanta Gokhale (2000). Playwright at the Centre: Marathi drama from 1843 to the present. Seagull Books. ISBN 817046157X.
- Tyā varshī (Marathi). Mauja Prakashan. Griha, 2008. ISBN 8174867139.
- Rita Welinkar. Orient Blackswan. 1995. ISBN 812500324X.
- The Scenes We Made: An Oral History of Experimental Theatre in Mumbai. Speaking Tiger Books. 2015. ISBN 978-93-85288-99-9.
- One Foot On The Ground: A Life Told Through The Body - autobiography. Speaking Tiger Books. 2018. ISBN 9789388874854
- Shivaji Park: Dadar 28: History, Places, People. Speaking Tiger Books. 2020. ISBN 9788194472902

Plays

- Avinash: the indestructible. Seagull Books. 1994. ISBN 8170461073.

As translator

- Satish Alekar (2003). Begum Barve. Translated by Shanta Gokhale. Seagull Books. ISBN 8170462088.
- Mahesh Elkunchwar (2004). City plays (Playscript). Translated by Shanta Gokhale; Manjula Padmanabhan. Seagull Books. ISBN 8170462304.
- Durga Khote (2006). I, Durga Khote: An autobiography. Translated by Shanta Gokhale. Oxford University Press. ISBN 0195674758.
- Mahesh Elkunchwar (2008). Collected plays of Mahesh Elkunchwar: Garbo, Desire in the rocks, Old stone mansion, Reflection, Sonata, An actor exits. Translated by Shanta Gokhale; Supantha Bhattacharya. Oxford University Press. ISBN 978-0195697971.
- Satish Alekar (2010). Collected Plays of Satish Alekar: The Dread Departure, Deluge, the Terrorist, Dynasts, Begum Barve, Mickey and the Memsahib. Translated by Gauri Deshpande; Urmila Bhirdikar; Alok Bhalla; Jayant Dhupkar; Pramod Kale; Shanta Gokhale. Oxford University Press. ISBN 978-0198069881.

== Personal life ==
Shanta Gokhale was married to Lt. Cdr. Vijaykumar Shahane, with whom she has two children, Girish Shahane, and noted film and television actress, Renuka Shahane. After their divorce, she was briefly married to noted filmmaker Arun Khopkar. She currently lives in Lalit Estate, Shivaji Park, Mumbai, with her two helpers, Alka Dhulap and Sanjay Pashte, and is neighbours with Jerry Pinto.

Over the years, Gokhale has served as a mentor for many, including poet Arundhathi Subramaniam.

== Awards and accolades ==
- Two National Awards (for documentary film scripts)
- Two Maharashtra state awards for literary creation for her novels (one for Crowfall in 2008 and the previous one being the VS Khandekar Award for Rita Welinkar)
- Sangeet Natak Akademi Award 2015 (for her overall contribution/scholarship for performing arts)
- Ooty Literary Festival Lifetime Achievement Award (2018)
- Tata Literature Live! Lifetime Achievement Award (2019)
- Sahitya Akademi Translation Prize 2021 for her translation Smritichitre :The Memoirs of a Spirited Wife originally written in Marathi by Lakshmibai Tilak.
