= Helen: The Life and Times of an H-Bomb =

2006 book by Jerry Pinto

- Author: Jerry Pinto
- Genre: Non-fiction
- Publication date: 2006

Helen: The Life and Times of an H-Bomb is a 2006 book written by Jerry Pinto and based on Bollywood actress and dancer Helen. It was received positively by critics and won the 2006 National Film Award for Best Book on Cinema.
