= Jnan Pujari =

Indian writer

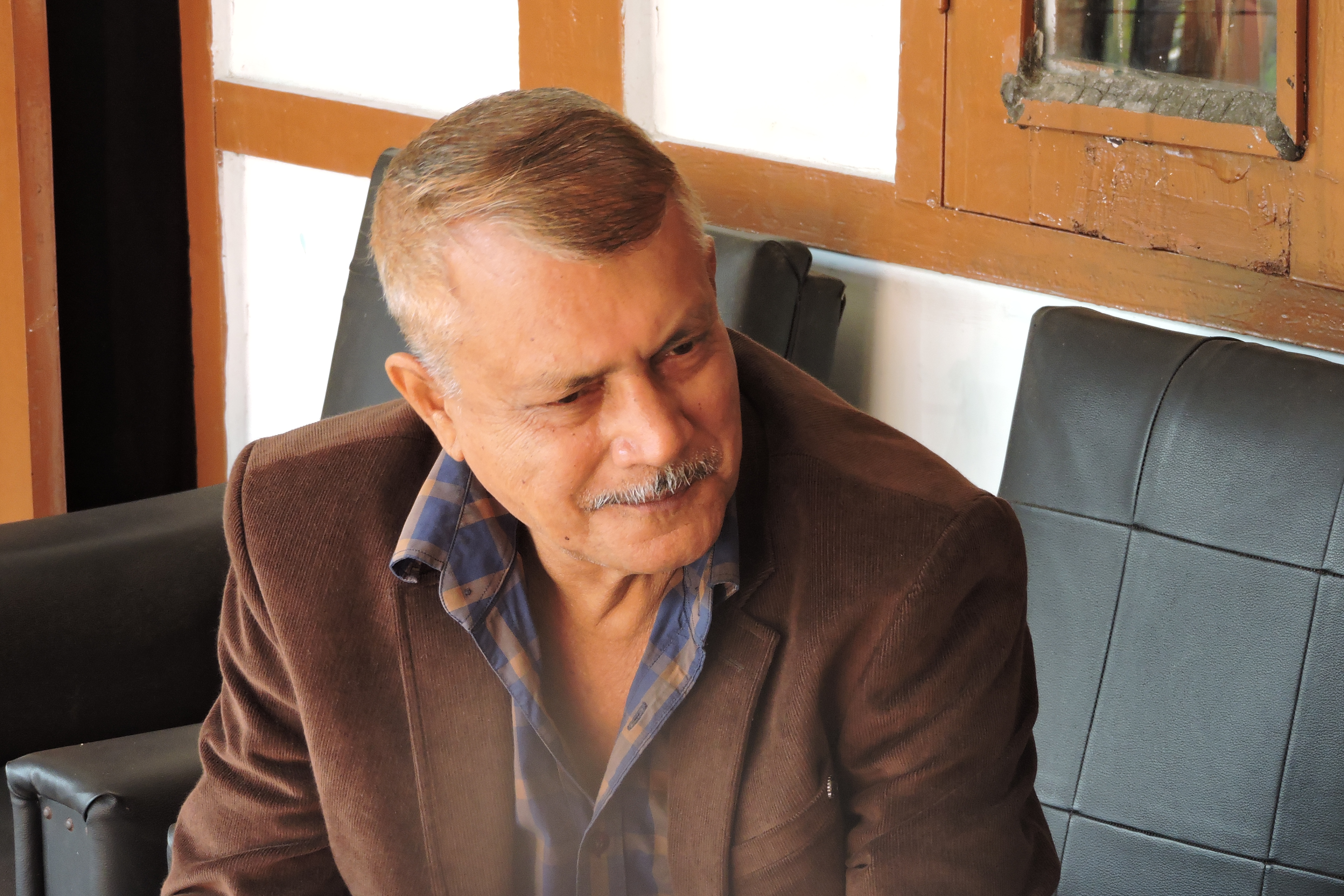
Jnan Pujari At Kaziranga

Jnan Pujari who hails from Gohpur of Biswanath District, is an Assamese writer who was awarded with Golden Lotus Award in the section National Film Award for Best Book on Cinema in 49th National Film Awards.

== Early life ==
He was born in 1948 and post-graduated in Assamese from Dibrugarh University.

== Awards ==
In 2016, he was awarded the Sahitya Akademi Award for his poetry-collection named Meghmalar Bhraman.
