= Granthali =

Granthali was founded in 1974. Amongst its founders were Ashok Jain the then executive editor of Maharashtra Times and Dinkar Gangal. It was founded on an initial capital of rupees twenty-five paid by fourteen promoters. Its first publication was Doob, a collection of essays written by Durga Bhagwat. Books were sold at cost price and the organisation was run by volunteers. It published Baluta, an autobiographical work by Daya Pawar, in 1978, a book that caused a sensation in Marathi society. By 2001, it had published 250 titles in about 25 years; 130 of these titles received honours. It is headquartered in a former municipal school building in Grant Road locality of Mumbai, a city in the state of Maharashtra, India.

Granthali, translated by Philip G. Altbach as a "Reader's Movement", was founded by several Marathi language authors. According to Altbach, it aims to publish a certain number of titles per annum for its members. These books are also available to the general public at a price higher than they are offered to members. It is a volunteer effort of committed authors. According to Altbach, it demonstrates a "consciousness about the prices of books and the means of distribution among at least a few writers and journalists". Liberalisation And Globalisation of Indian Economy : Volume 6 describes it as a library movement led by secular intellectual Maharashtrian elite. It has contained in itself the principles of Maharashtra's 19th-century reform movement. Granthali publishes original Marathi books and translations from other languages. It finds the use of "exhibition-cum-sale-cum discussion" method involving "celebrity intellectuals" the most pleasing feature of this movement. Braj B. Kachru et al. consider Granthali an important innovation, an advantage that the Marathi language possessed which resulted in Dalit literature originating in the Marathi language in Maharashtra.
