= Em and the Big Hoom =

2012 novel by Jerry Pinto

- First edition
- Author: Jerry Pinto
- Language: English
- Genre: Fiction
- Publisher: Aleph Book Company; Penguin; Turtleback Books
- Publication date: 1 April 2012
- Publication place: India
- Pages: 240 (first edition hardcover)
- ISBN: 8192328023

Em and the Big Hoom is a 2012 English-language novel written by Jerry Pinto. The book won The Hindu Literary Prize, the Crossword Book Award, the Sahitya Akademi Award, and the Windham–Campbell Literature Prize.

The foundation of the book is built on the unusual relationships within the Mendes family: Imelda, Augustine, their daughter Susan, and their unnamed son from whose perspective the book is narrated. The non-linear storyline chronicles the life of the family, from the early lives of Imelda and Augustine (known by their children as 'Em' and 'The Big Hoom') to the family's chaotic struggle with Em's bipolar disorder, her euphoric flamboyance, strange charm, and paranoid attempts at suicide.

== Background and writing ==
While generally categorised as fiction, the book draws heavily on Pinto's upbringing as a Goan Catholic in Bombay, and his family's struggle with his own mother's bipolar disorder. An earlier version of the novel was written in the form of a memoir, but was rewritten as fiction after it began to take an emotional toll on Pinto. The original draft of the novel was around 750,000 words, three times the length of War and Peace.

== Critical reception ==
The book was praised by several writers, including Salman Rushdie, who called it "one of the very best books to come out of India in a long, long time." Amitav Ghosh said that the novel was "profoundly moving book" and that he could not remember when he had last read something as touching. In a review for India Today, Anvar Alikhan said of the novel, "I don't know how much of this book is autobiographical, but I suspect a large part of it is: It's just too authentic, in its minutiae of mental illness, and its deliberately matter-of-fact narrative of pain, for it to be the fiction that it pretends to be. It's an emotionally daunting book and, frankly, I'm not sure everybody will have the strength, or even the compassion, to reap its richness."

For The Irish Times, Eileen Battersby wrote in her review, "Pinto’s book is shocking in its impressive understatement (.....) There may not be such a thing as a perfect book, yet Jerry Pinto comes heartbreakingly close."

In The Guardian, Scarlett Thomas wrote, "This book is most successful when the characters are allowed to speak for themselves, and Pinto is quite a genius with dialogue. (...) This is an India that many people won't have seen, and while we don't spend enough time in that flat in Bombay, it is worth hanging around outside." Peter Yeung of The Financial Times reported, "It is written with genuine compassion and sincerity, while a sprinkling of black humour ensures it is never overly sentimental."

== Awards ==
- 2016 Windham–Campbell Literature Prize for fiction (co-winner)
- 2016 Kendra Sahitya Akademi award - English
- 2013 Crossword Book Award for fiction (co-winner)
- 2012 The Hindu Literary Prize

== Translations ==
- Marathi: एम आणि हूमराव (Em ani Hoomrao), translated by Shanta Gokhale
- French: Nous l'appelions Em, translated by Myriam Bellehigue
- Noted Tamil translator Kannaiyan Daksnamurthy has translated this award winning novel into Tamil under the title Tamil: எம்மும் பெரிய ஹூமும் (Em'mum periya hūmum), and Sahitya Akademy has published it.
