= Music by Laxmikant Pyarelal: The Incredibly Melodious Journey =

2021 book by Rajiv Vijayakar

- Author: Rajiv Vijayakar
- Language: English
- Genre: Non-fiction
- Publisher: Rupa Publications
- Awards: National Film Award for Best Book on Cinema (2023)
- ISBN: 978-9355201362

Music by Laxmikant Pyarelal: The Incredibly Melodious Journey is a book authored by Rajiv Vijayakar, published in 2021 by Rupa Publications India. It explores the musical legacy of the renowned Indian composer duo Laxmikant-Pyarelal, celebrated for their substantial contributions to Bollywood and Hindi cinema. The book traces their extensive work across numerous films and their influence on Indian film music. It was honored with the National Film Award for Best Book on Cinema at the 69th National Film Awards in 2023 for its 2021 edition.

== Background ==
Rajiv Vijayakar, a seasoned entertainment journalist, penned the book to document the career of Laxmikant-Pyarelal, consisting of Laxmikant Shantaram Kudalkar and Pyarelal Ramprasad Sharma. The work reflects his expertise in Indian film music, compiled through research and analysis of the duo's achievements.

== Content ==
The book chronicles the journey of Laxmikant-Pyarelal from their early influences to their prominent role in the Hindi film industry, where they composed music for over 700 films. It highlights their adaptability across different musical styles and their partnerships with leading singers. The narrative also includes personal stories and the obstacles they faced during their career.

== Reception ==
The book has received positive feedback for its detailed research and engaging narrative. Firstpost commended its depth, making it valuable for Bollywood music enthusiasts. Hindustan Times appreciated its balanced portrayal of the duo's professional successes and personal challenges. Rediff.com noted its comprehensive coverage of the duo's musical contributions. Its National Film Award recognition affirms its importance in Indian cinema literature.

== Awards ==
National Film Award for Best Book on Cinema: Awarded at the 69th National Film Awards, announced on 11 August 2023 for the 2021 publication.
