= Samakalika Malayalam Vaarika =

- Editor: Saji James
- Former editors: S. Jayachandran Nair
- Categories: Cultural magazine
- Frequency: Weekly
- Publisher: The New Indian Express Group
- Country: India
- Language: Malayalam
- Website: www.samakalikamalayalam.com

Samakalika Malayalam Vaarika is a Malayalam language newsweekly and website published by The Express Publications Madurai (P) Ltd, publisher of The New Indian Express daily. The publication, conceived as a newsweekly, is a leading voice in the cultural and political sphere of Kerala.

== History ==
When the weekly was started in May 1997 veteran journalist S. Jayachandran Nair was at the helm as Editor. He continued in that position until 2012. Currently, it is led by a team headed by its Editor Saji James, with TJS George, a renowned figure both in English and Malayalam journalism is the editorial advisor.
