= Baburao Bagul =

Indian writer (1930–2008)

- Born: Baburao Ramaji Bagul; 17 July 1930; Vihitgaon, Nashik district, Maharashtra
- Died: 26 March 2008 (aged 77); Nashik, Maharashtra
- Occupations: Writer and poet
- Writing career
- Notable works: Jevha Mi Jat Chorali Hoti! (When I had Concealed My Caste) (1963); Maran Swasta Hot Ahe (Death is Getting Cheaper) (1969); Ambedkar Bharat (Ambedkar India) (1981)

Baburao Ramji Bagul (17 July 1930 – 26 March 2008) was a Marathi writer from Maharashtra, India; a pioneer of modern literature in Marathi and an important figure in the Indian short story during the late 20th century, when it experienced a radical departure from the past, with the advent of Dalit writers such as him.

He is most known for his works such as, Jevha Mi Jaat Chorli Hoti! (1963), Maran Swasta Hot Ahe (1969), Sahitya Ajache Kranti Vigyan, Sud (1970), and Ambedkar Bharat (1981).

== Biography ==
Baburao Ramaji Bagul was born in Nashik on 17 July 1930. After high school education, he did various manual jobs until 1968. While doing so, he published several stories in magazines, which started getting attention from Marathi readers. Eventually in 1963, came his first collection of stories, Jevha Mi Jat Chorali (When I had Concealed My Caste), it created a stir in Marathi literature with its passionate depiction of a crude society and thus brought in new momentum to Modern Marathi literature in Marathi; today it is seen by many critics as the epic of the downtrodden, and was later made into a film by actor-director Vinay Apte.

He followed it up with a collection of poems, Akar (Shape) (1967), which gave immediate visibility, but it was his second collection of short stories Maran Swasta Hot Ahe (Death is Getting Cheaper) (1969), which cemented his position as an important enlightened voice of his generation. The collection is now considered an important landmark in Dalit writing in India and in 1970 he was awarded the 'Harinarayan Apte Award' by the Government of Maharashtra.

Bagul was an Ambedkarite Buddhist. After 1968, he became a full-time writer of literature which continued to deal with the lives of marginalized downtrodden people in Maharashtra. His fictional writing gave graphic accounts of the lives of that class of people. The thoughts of B. R. Ambedkar, Jyotiba Phule, and Karl Marx had an influence on Bagul's mind. He soon became an important radical thinker of the Dalit movement, and published a major ideologue of the Panther, Manifesto of Panther, in 1972. In the same year he presided over the 'Modern Literary Conference' held at Mahad. Over the years his stories taught future Dalit writers to give creative rendition to their autobiographical narratives.

He died on 26 March 2008 at Nashik, and was survived by his wife, two sons, two daughters.

Subsequently, the Yashwantrao Chavan Maharashtra Open University instituted the Baburao Bagul Gaurav Puraskar Award in recognition of his contributions to Marathi literature, to be given annually to the debut work of a budding short-story writer.

== Works ==
- "Jevha Mi Jaat Chorali Hoti!" (जेव्हा मी जात चोरली होती!) (1963)
- "Maran Swasta Hot Ahe" (मरण स्वस्त होत आहे) (1969)
- "Sud" (सूड) (1970)
- "Dalit Sahitya Ajache Kranti Vignyan" (दलित साहित्य आजचे क्रांतिविज्ञान)
- "Ambedkar Bharat" (आंबेडकर भारत) (1981)
- Aghori (अघोरी) (1983)
- Pashan (पाषाण) (1972)
- Apurva (अपूर्वा)
- Kondi (कोंडी) (2002)
- Pawsha (पावशा) (1971)
- Bhumihin (भूमिहीन)
- Mooknayak (मूकनायक)
- Sardar (सरदार)
- Vedaadhi Tu Hotas (वेदाआधी तू होता) [poetry collection]
- Dalit Sahitya : Aajche Krantividyan (दलित साहित्य: आजचे क्रांतिविज्ञान)

== Translation ==
- Death is Getting Cheaper – Another India: an anthology of contemporary Indian fiction and poetry, editors, Nissim Ezekiel, Meenakshi Mukherjee. Penguin Books, 1990. Page 103.
- Mother – Indian short stories, 1900–2000, by E. V. Ramakrishnan. Sahitya Akademi, 2005. Page 217.
- When I Hid My Caste - Stories, translated by Jerry Pinto, Speaking Tiger, 2018
