= Anirudha Bhattacharjee =

Music historian and author

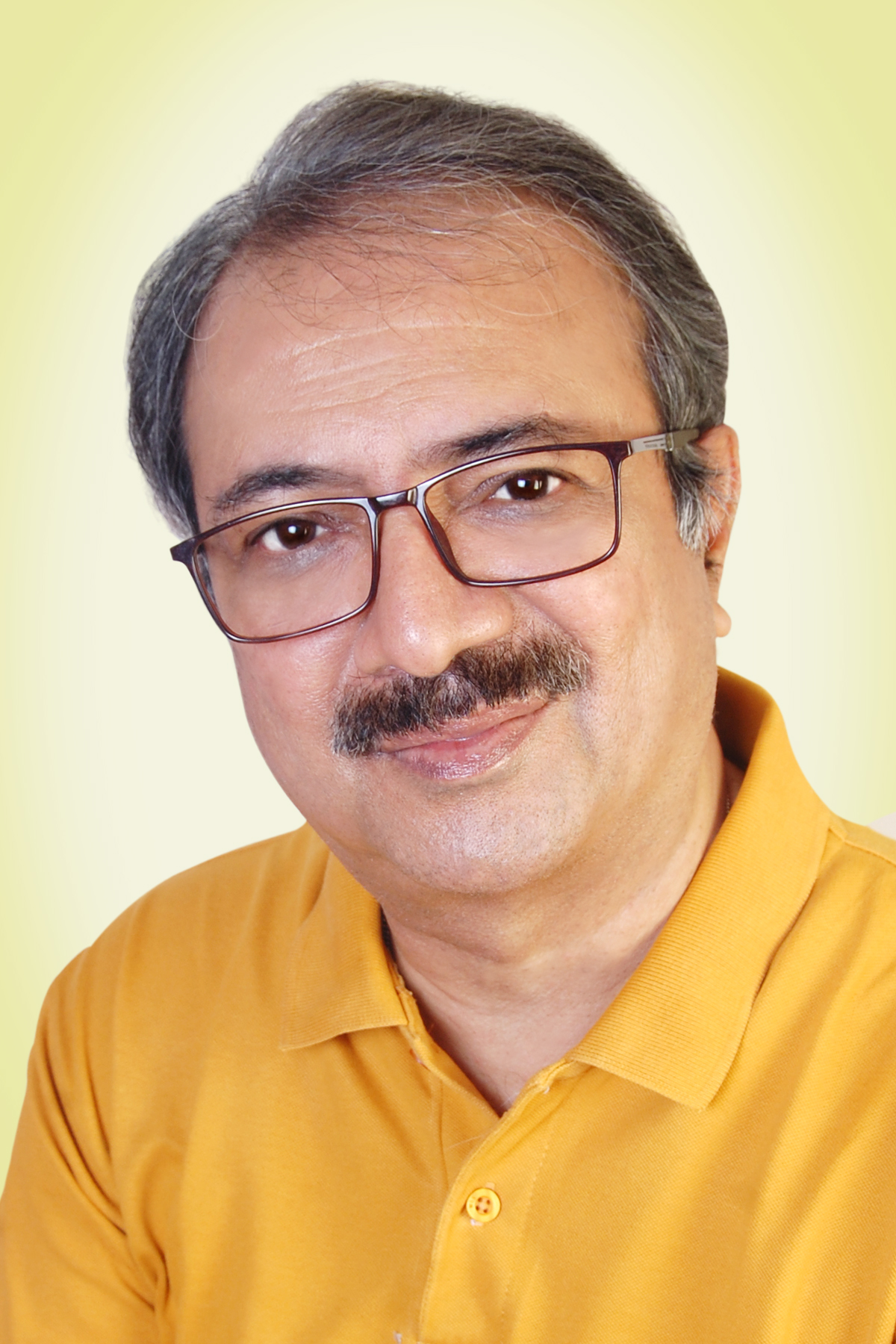

Anirudha Bhattacharjee is a Calcutta-based music historian and author.

== Life ==
Anirudh was an engineering graduate of IIT Kharagpur.

== Publications ==
He has authored and co-authored six books on cinema and music. They are as follows:

- R. D. Burman: The Man The Music. HarperCollins, 2011. With Balaji Vittal. ISBN 978-9350290491.
- Gaata Rahe Mera Dil. HarperCollins, 2015. With Balaji Vittal. ISBN 978-9351364566.
- S.D. Burman: the Prince-Musician. Tranquebar, 2018. With Balaji Vittal. ISBN 978-9387578180.
- Kishore Kumar: The Ultimate Biography. HarperCollins, 2022. With Parthiv Dhar. ISBN 978-9356291713.
- Basu Chatterji: and Middle of the Road Cinema. Penguin India, 2023. ISBN 9780670096251.
- Lata Mangeshkar: My Favourites, Vol. 2

== Awards ==
- 2011: National Film Award for Best Book on Cinema, 59th National Film Awards for R. D. Burman: The Man The Music
- 2011: Nominated for Shakti Bhatt award for Best non-fiction book for R. D. Burman: The Man The Music
- 2015: Jio MAMI Award for Excellence in Writing in Cinema for Gaata Rahe Mera Dil
