= David Marsh (financial specialist) =

British financial specialist, business consultant and writer

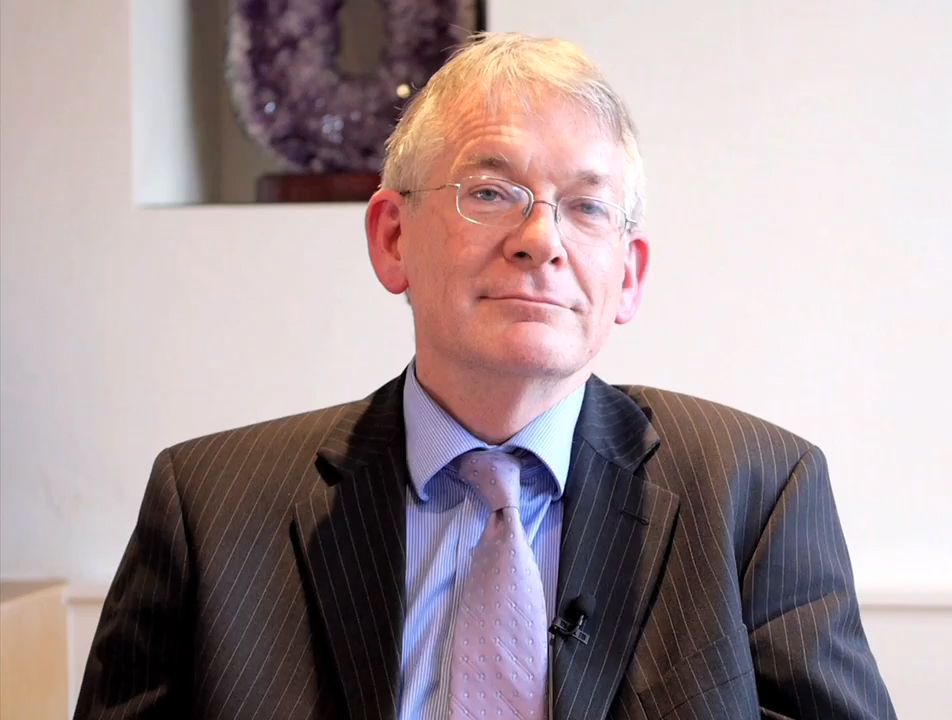
- Marsh in 2014
- Born: 30 July 1952; Shoreham-by-Sea, Sussex, England
- Education: Queen's College Oxford
- Website: www.omfif.org

David Wayne Marsh CBE (born 30 July 1952) is a British financial specialist, business consultant and writer on political, economic and monetary issues.

== Career and education ==
Marsh was born in Shoreham-by-Sea, Sussex on 30 July 1952. He started his career at Reuters in 1973 having graduated with a BA in chemistry from Queen's College Oxford. Between 1978 and 1995, he worked for the Financial Times newspaper in France and Germany, latterly as European Editor in London.

Following his journalism career, Marsh worked for City merchant bank Robert Fleming, corporate finance boutique Hawkpoint and German management consultancy Droege. He is former co-founder, chairman and deputy chairman of the German-British Forum as well as former Chairman of the Advisory Board of the London & Oxford Group.

As of 2026, Marsh is a Senior Adviser to asset management company Soditic. He is also a Board Member of Henderson Eurotrust, and the British Chamber of Commerce in Germany, and visiting professor at Sheffield University’s department of politics and The Policy Institute at King's College London.

In 2010, Marsh co-founded the Official Monetary and Financial Institutions Forum (OMFIF), where he serves as Chairman.

Marsh is a frequent commentator in Europe and the US, writing articles for The Wall Street Journal's MarketWatch, and German newspaper Handelsblatt. He contributes occasionally to other media outlets that include Financial Times, New York Times.

== Awards and honours ==
In 2000, Marsh was appointed as a Commander of The Most Excellent Order of the British Empire for services to Anglo-German relations, and was awarded the German Order of Merit in 2003.

== Publications ==
Marsh has written six books, with his three most recent books published by Yale University Press and OMFIF Press. His books have been translated into German, Dutch, Spanish, Chinese, Japanese and Korean.

- Germany – Rich, Bothered and Divided (1989)
- The Bundesbank – The Bank that Rules Europe (1992)
- Germany and Europe – The Crisis of Unity (1994)
- The Euro – The Politics of the New Global Currency (2009) – re-released in 2011 as The Battle for the New Global Currency.
- Europe's Deadlock: How the Crisis Could Be Solved - And Why It Won't Happen (2013). Updated in 2016 as Europe's Deadlock: How the Crisis Could Be Solved - And Why It Still Won't Happen..
- Six Days in September (2017)
- Can Europe Survive? (2025)
