= The Longest Kiss: The Life and Times of Devika Rani =

2021 biography by Kishwar Desai

- Author: Kishwar Desai
- Language: English
- Genre: Biography
- Publisher: Westland Publications
- Publication date: January 2021
- Awards: National Film Award for Best Book on Cinema (2020)
- ISBN: 978-9390679874

The Longest Kiss: The Life and Times of Devika Rani is a biography written by Indian author Kishwar Desai, published in 2021 by Westland Publications. The book chronicles the life of Devika Rani, often regarded as one of the earliest leading actresses of Indian cinema and the "first lady of Hindi films." Known for her role in the 1933 film Karma, which featured a notably long kissing scene, Devika Rani's life story unfolds through Desai's narrative, blending her cinematic achievements with her personal struggles and elite social milieu in pre-Independence India. The book received the National Film Award for Best Book on Cinema at the 68th National Film Awards, recognising its contribution to documenting Indian film history.

== Summary ==
The biography traces Devika Rani’s journey from her privileged upbringing in a Bengali family connected to Rabindranath Tagore to her emergence as a pioneering figure in Indian cinema. It details her training in acting and design in London, her return to India, and her collaboration with her first husband, Himanshu Rai, in establishing Bombay Talkies, a prominent film studio in the 1930s. The book highlights her bold on-screen persona, particularly in Karma, which stirred controversy due to its two-minute kissing scene with Rai, earning her both fame and criticism.

Desai also explores the complexities of Devika Rani's personal life, including her tumultuous marriage to Rai, her brief romance with actor Najmul Hasan, and her later marriage to Russian painter Svetoslav Roerich. The narrative delves into her resilience amid professional setbacks and societal scrutiny, painting her as a woman who navigated fame and adversity with dignity. The book draws on previously unpublished letters, film archives, and interviews to offer a comprehensive view of her contributions to Indian cinema and her enigmatic personality.

== Development and release ==
Kishwar Desai began working on The Longest Kiss with an intent to uncover the lesser-known facets of Devika Rani's life, a figure she felt had been overshadowed in the annals of Indian cinema despite her pioneering contributions. The development process involved years of research, drawing from Devika Rani's personal letters, Bombay Talkies archives, and conversations with those familiar with her legacy. Desai, known for her historical narratives, aimed to situate Devika Rani's story within the broader context of pre-Independence India's cultural and cinematic evolution, a process that took shape through meticulous archival exploration.

The book's development gained public attention as early as 2019, when reports emerged about Desai's efforts to bring Devika Rani's story to light. This period also saw related cultural activities, including a theatrical production in Bengaluru titled Devika Rani: Goddess of the Silver Screen, staged in September 2019, which hinted at growing interest in her life ahead of the book's release. By December 2020, Onmanorama reported that the biography was nearing completion, with Desai focusing on presenting Devika Rani as a complex individual beyond her cinematic persona.

The Longest Kiss was published by Westland Publications in January 2021, marking the culmination of Desai's research. The release aligned with a renewed curiosity about early Indian cinema, bolstered by the book's detailed insights into Devika Rani's era. Initial announcements about the book, such as those in The Pioneer in 2019, underscored its anticipated role in reviving interest in Bombay Talkies and its founders. The launch was further contextualised by cultural events like the Bengaluru play, which Desai acknowledged as a complementary effort to reintroduce Devika Rani to modern audiences. The book's significance was later affirmed when it won the National Film Award for Best Book on Indian Cinema in 2022.

== Critical reception ==
The Longest Kiss received widespread praise from critics for its meticulous research and engaging storytelling. The Hindustan Times described it as a “captivating read” that successfully brings Devika Rani's multifaceted life to the forefront. Open The Magazine lauded Desai's ability to weave a narrative that is “both intimate and historically rich,” calling it a “kiss of life” to Devika Rani's legacy. Newslaundry appreciated the book's window into pre-1947 Bombay's elite society, noting its relevance to contemporary readers interested in cultural history.

Some reviews highlighted Desai's nuanced portrayal of Devika Rani's resilience. The Hindu Business Line called it a “sensitive exploration” of a woman ahead of her time, while The New Indian Express praised its contribution to recognising women's roles in shaping Indian cinema. However, a few critics, such as Daily Pioneer, felt the book occasionally leaned too heavily on anecdotal details, though they acknowledged its overall depth. Onmanorama termed it a “revelatory work” that demystifies Devika Rani's enigma, cementing its place as a significant biographical account.
