= R. D. Burman: The Man The Music =

2011 non-fiction book

- First edition
- Author: Anirudha Bhattacharjee and Balaji Vittal
- Language: English
- Subject: R. D. Burman
- Genre: Non-fiction
- Publisher: HarperCollins
- Publication date: 2011

R. D. Burman: The Man The Music is a 2011 Indian English language non-fiction book written by Anirudha Bhattacharjee and Balaji Vittal. The subject of the book is R. D. Burman. It won the 2011 National Film Award for Best Book on Cinema.

The book was written when both the authors were changing jobs, and they wanted to use the time to go back to memories of the late 1960s through to the late 1980s. The working title of the book was The Pancham Caravan. The first three chapters were written and submitted to Shantanu Ray Chaudhuri, Managing Editor, HarperCollins India in January 2009, who gave the go-ahead in 30 minutes. The contract was signed at Delhi Hat, on February 14, 2009.

Writing this book entailed multiple tasks, the most important one of which was meeting the musicians with whom R D Burman had worked. The first person to be interviewed for the book was ace guitarist Ramesh Iyer. The manuscript was completed in October 2010.

The book had multi-city launches, with the first one at The Oxford Book Shop, Mumbai, on April 26, 2011. Subsequent launches happened at Crossword, Kolkata, at India Habitat Center, New Delhi. Launches were also held at Jaipur and at Chennai.

The book opened to raving reviews and was nominated for the Shakti Bhatt Award in 2011. It went on to win the National Film Award for Best Book on Cinema at the 59th National Film Awards in 2011.

The book has been the subject of multiple music cum talk shows in India, the UAE, London and Singapore.
