= Meghnad Desai, Baron Desai =

British economist and politician (1940–2025)

The Right Honourable The Lord Desai
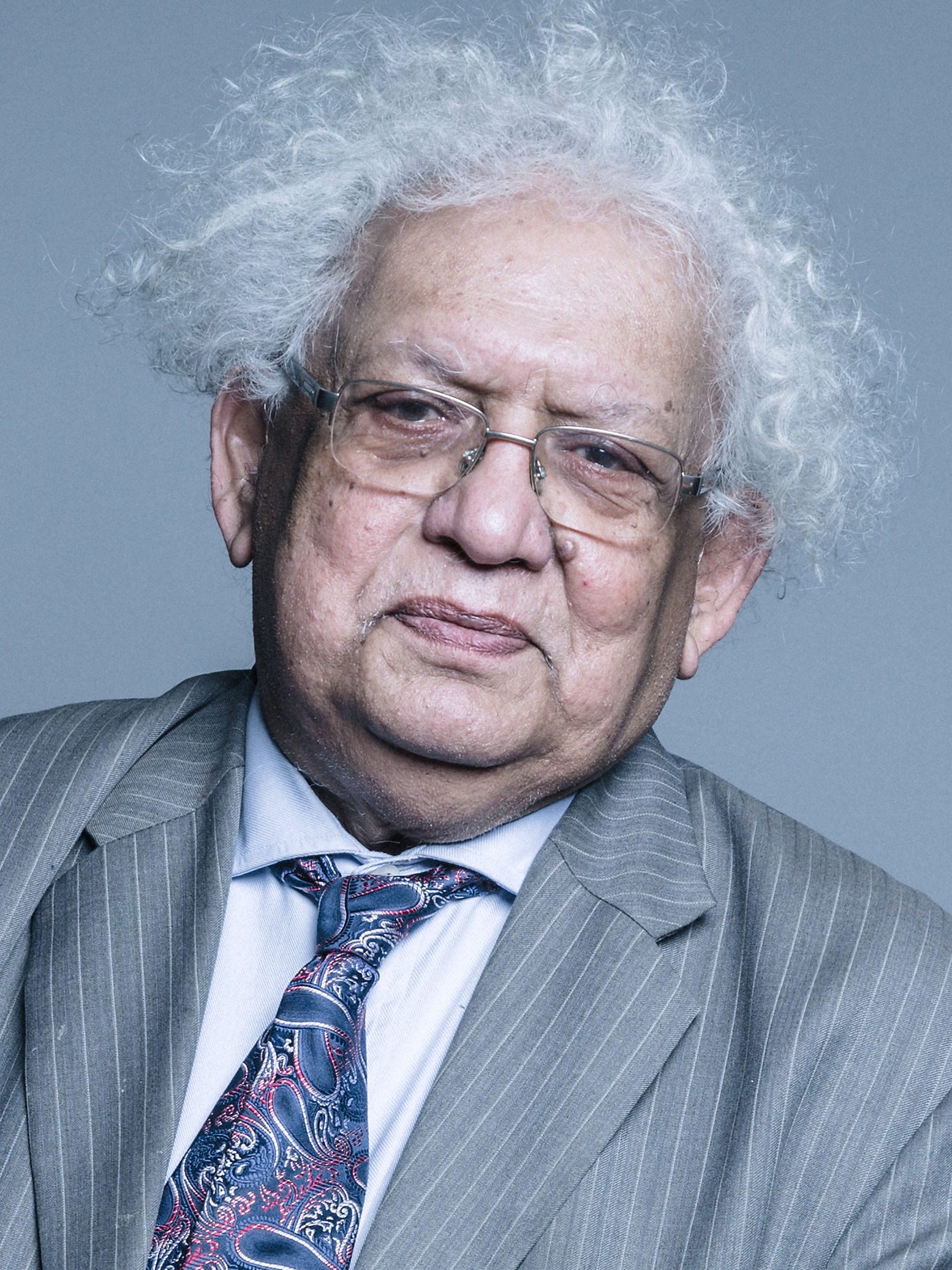

Member of the House of Lords
- Lord Temporal
- Life peerage 5 June 1991 – 29 July 2025

Personal details
- Born: Meghnad Jagdishchandra Desai; 10 July 1940 Vadodara, Baroda State, India (now Gujarat, India)
- Died: 29 July 2025 (aged 85) London, England
- Citizenship: Born and raised in India; naturalised British
- Spouse: Kishwar Desai (m. 2004)
- Education: University of Mumbai; University of Pennsylvania
- Occupation: Economist, politician

Meghnad Jagdishchandra Desai, Baron Desai (10 July 1940 – 29 July 2025) was an Indian-born British economist and Labour politician.

Desai stood unsuccessfully for the position of Lord Speaker in the House of Lords in 2011. He was awarded the Padma Bhushan, the third highest civilian award in the Republic of India, in 2008.

== Early life ==
Born in Vadodara, Baroda State, British Raj (now in Gujarat) on 10 July 1940, Desai grew up with two brothers and one sister. He is said to have gone to secondary school at age seven and matriculated at 14. He secured a bachelor's degree in economics from Ramnarain Ruia College, affiliated with the University of Mumbai, and then pursued a master's degree in economics from the Department of Economics (now called the Mumbai School of Economics and Public Policy) of the University of Mumbai, after which he won a scholarship to the University of Pennsylvania in August 1960. He completed his PhD in economics at Pennsylvania in 1963.

== Political career ==
Desai was active in the British Labour Party, becoming chairman of Islington South and Finsbury Constituency Labour Party in London between 1986 and 1992, and later its honorary Lifetime President. He was created a life peer as Baron Desai, of St Clement Danes in the City of Westminster, on 5 June 1991. He was a member of Labour Friends of Israel. Desai quit his Labour Party membership of 49 years over antisemitism concerns in November 2020, following the readmission of former party Leader Jeremy Corbyn as a member.

== Academic career ==
Early in his career, Desai worked as an Associate Specialist in the Department of Agricultural Economics, University of California, Berkeley, California. He became a lecturer at the London School of Economics in 1965 and professor of economics in 1983. At the LSE, he taught econometrics, macroeconomics, Marxian economics and development economics over the years. In the 1970s, he taught an idiosyncratic version of economic principles to freshers at the LSE (starting with Piero Sraffa). From 1990 to 1995, he headed LSE’s Development Studies Institute and led LSE Global Governance from 1992 to 2003, the year of his retirement.

Desai wrote his first book Marxian Economic Theory in 1973 followed by Applied Econometrics in 1976 and Marxian Economics, a revised edition of his 1973 book in 1979. He wrote Testing Monetarism, a critique of monetarism, in 1981.

Desai wrote extensively publishing over 200 articles in academic journals and had a regular column in the British radical weekly Tribune during 1985–1994, in the Indian business daily Business Standard (1995–2001) and in Indian Express and Financial Express. From 1984 to 1991, he was co-editor of the Journal of Applied Econometrics. A selection of his academic papers was published in two volumes as The Selected Essays of Meghnad Desai in 1995.

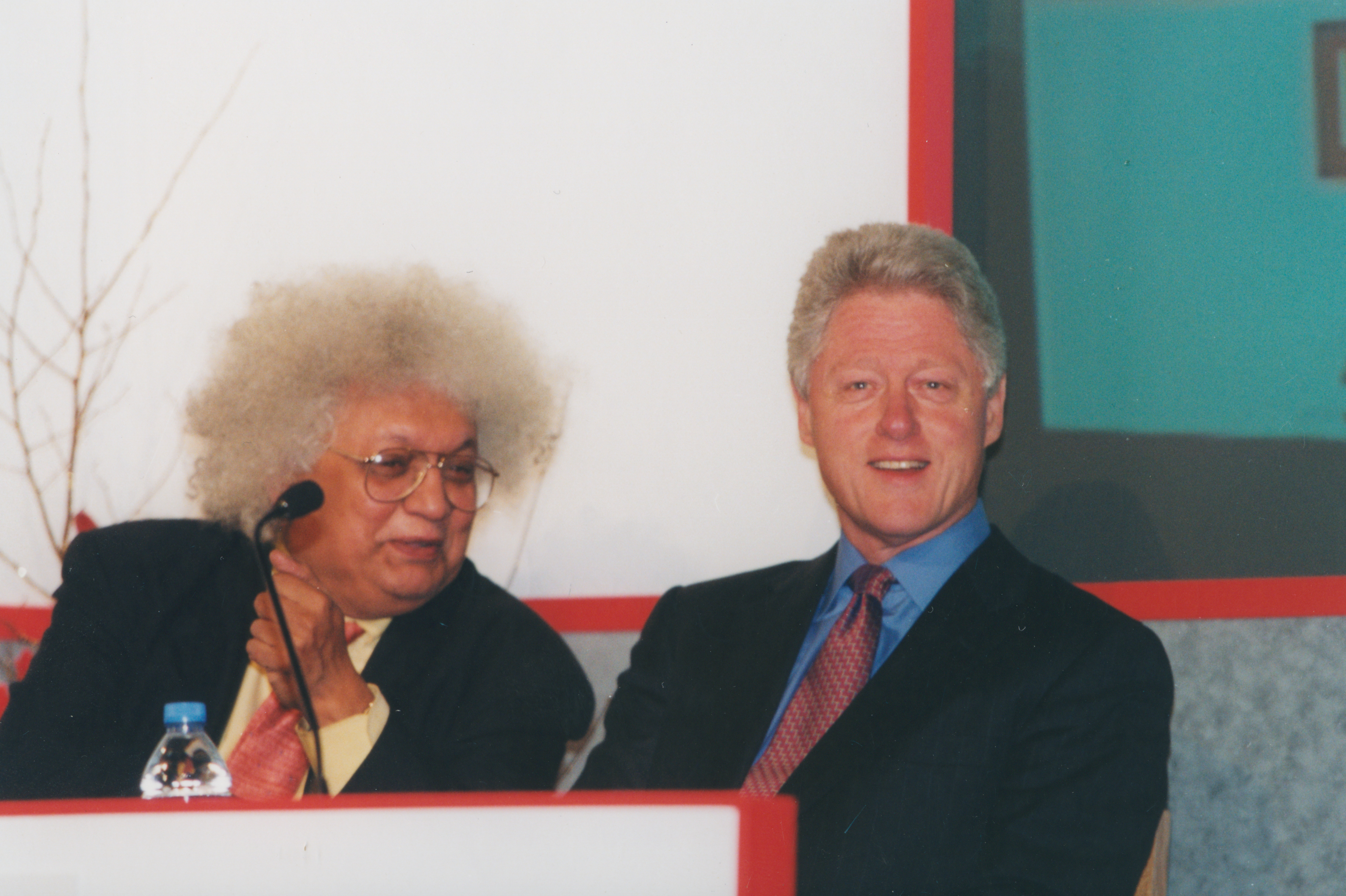
Meghnad Desai with Bill Clinton in 2001

In 2002, Desai's book Marx's Revenge: The Resurgence of Capitalism and the Death of Statist Socialism stated that globalisation would tend toward the revival of socialism. Desai analysed some of Marx's lesser known writings and argued that his theories enhance our understanding of modern capitalism and globalization. His work was well received, with The Guardian stating 'If only socialists had studied Marx properly, they would have known all along that capitalism would triumph. Meghnad Desai gets behind the slogans in Marx's Revenge'.

Desai also published a biography of Indian film star Dilip Kumar entitled Nehru's Hero: Dilip Kumar in the life of India (Roli, 2004). He described the book as his "greatest achievement". Examining Kumar's films – some of which Desai saw more than 15 times – he discovered parallels between the socio-political arena in India and its reflection on screen. He discussed issues as varied as censorship, the iconic values of Indian machismo, cultural identity and secularism, and analysed how the films portrayed a changing India at that time.

He was (2023) chairman of the Official Monetary and Financial Institutions Forum (OMFIF) Advisory Board, an independent membership-driven research network. It focuses on global policy and investment themes for off the record public and private sector engagement and analysis. He was also chairman of the Trustee's Board for Training for Life, Chairman of the Management Board of City Roads and on the Board of Tribune magazine.

After retirement he published Rethinking Islamism: Ideology of the New Terror (2006), The Route to All Evil: The Political Economy of Ezra Pound (2007), a novel Dead on Time, (2009) and The Rediscovery of India (2009).

Lord Desai served as the founder chairman of the Meghnad Desai Academy of Economics in Mumbai (MDAE). MDAE offers a one-year post-graduate diploma in economics, offered jointly with Department of Economics (Autonomous), University of Mumbai. MDAE focuses on applied learning and case studies rather than on rote learning. Students participate in workshops and seminars with top economics and finance professionals from around the world.

== Saif Al-Gaddafi thesis ==
In 2007, Desai was asked by the University of London to serve with Tony McGrew of the University of Southampton as one of the two examiners of the PhD thesis of Saif al-Islam Gaddafi, the son of the then leader of Libya. They did not immediately accept the thesis, as it was found to be weak. The candidate was subjected to an oral examination for two and a half hours and Gaddafi was asked to revise and re-submit it. The revised version was subsequently accepted.

As Desai had already retired from the LSE he had no involvement with the donation from Saif Gaddafi's charity to the LSE. Learning from the press of these links between LSE and Libya, Desai demanded that the money be returned to the people of Libya. He expressed disappointment at a speech Saif Gaddafi subsequently made on Libyan state television declaring the Gaddafi family's willingness to "fight to the last bullet", observing that "he was not behaving as if he had had an LSE education."

== Personal life and death ==
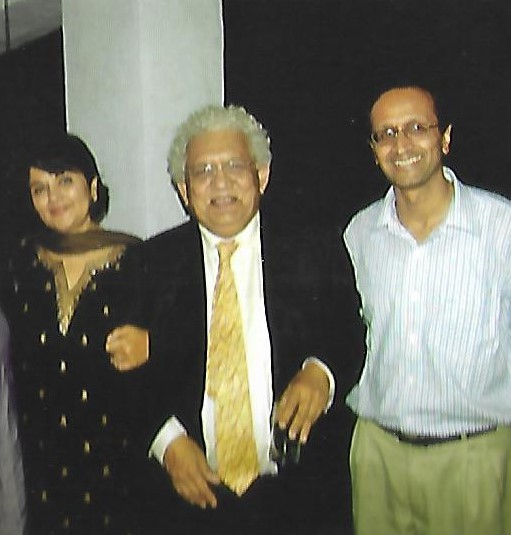
Desai with wife Kishwar Desai and then-headmaster Kanti Bajpai at The Doon School Founder's Day.

In 1970, Desai married his LSE colleague Gail Wilson, his first wife. She was the daughter of George Ambler Wilson, CBE. They had three children.

During the course of writing Nehru's Hero, Desai met Kishwar Ahluwalia (now Kishwar Desai), his second wife who worked as an editor for this book. On 20 July 2004 the couple married. Desai and 47-year-old Ahluwalia were both divorced and married at a registrar's office in London.

Desai was an atheist, being an Honorary Associate of the National Secular Society and a member of Humanists UK. He was a member of and an adviser to the 1928 Institute.

Desai died on 29 July 2025, at the age of 85.

== Works ==
- 1975, The Phillips Curve: A Revisionist Interpretation. Economica, Vol. 42, 165, 1-19.
- 1979, Marxian Economics . Rowman & Littlefield.
- 1994, Equilibrium, Expectations and Knowledge, in J. Birner & R. van Zijp, Hayek, Co-ordination and Evolution; His Legacy in Philosophy, Politics, Economics, and the History of Ideas. Routledge.
- 1991, Human development: Concepts and measurement. European Economic Review 35, 2–3, 350-357.
- 2001, Methodology, Microeconomics and Keynes: Essays in Honour of Victoria Chick, Volume 2. Eds. Philip Arestis, Meghnad Desai, Sheila Dow. Routledge.
- 2002, Marx’s Revenge: The Resurgence of Capitalism and the Death of Statist Socialism. Verso Books.
- 2006, The Route of All Evil: The Political Economy of Ezra Pound. Faber & Faber.
- 2011, The Rediscovery of India. Penguin.
- 2014, Testing Monetarism. Bloomsbury Academic.
- 2015, Hubris: Why Economists Failed to Predict the Crisis and How to Avoid the Next One. Yale University Press.
- 2017, Politic Shock. Rupa Publications.
- 2018, The Bombay Plan: Blueprint for Economic Resurgence. Eds, Sanjaya Baru and Meghnad Desai. Rupa Publications.
- 2022, The Poverty of Political Economy: How Economics Abandoned the Poor. HarperCollins India.

Literary criticism and novels

- 2004, (biography) Nehru's Hero: Dilip Kumar in the Life of India. Lotus Collection.
- 2009, (novel) Dead on Time, HarperCollins.
- 2013, Pakeezah: An Ode to a Bygone World. HarperCollins India
- 2014, Who Wrote the Bhagavadgita? A secular enquiry into a sacred text. Element Text.
- 2020, (novel) ANAMIKA: A Tale of Desire in a Time of War. Rupa Publications.
- 2022, MAYABHARATA: The Untold Story Behind the Death of Lord Krishna. Rupa Publications.

Autobiography

- 2020, Meghnad Desai, Rebellious Lord. Westland.
