= Silent Cinema (1895–1930) =

Silent Cinema (1895–1930) is an English language non-fiction book written by Pasupuleti Purnachandra Rao. It won the National Film Award for Best Book on Cinema.
