= Marx's Revenge =

2002 book by Meghnad Desai

Marx's Revenge: The Resurgence of Capitalism and the Death of Statist Socialism
- Cover
- Author: Meghnad Desai
- Language: English
- Subject: Karl Marx
- Publisher: Verso Books
- Publication date: 2002
- Publication place: United Kingdom
- Media type: Print (Hardcover and Paperback)
- ISBN: 9781859846445
- OCLC: 47775280

Marx's Revenge: The Resurgence of Capitalism and the Death of Statist Socialism is a 2002 book about the contemporary relevance of the philosopher Karl Marx by the economist Meghnad Desai.

== Summary ==
Desai analyses some of Marx's lesser-known writings and argues that his theories enhance our understanding of modern capitalism and globalization. Desai asserts that while socialists within or shortly after Marx's lifetime appropriated his critiques of capitalism to infer that its end would come soon, Marx himself wrote that, in Desai's words, "Capitalism would not go away until after it had exhausted its potential."
