= Stardust: Vignettes from the Fringes of Film Industry =

Stardust: Vignettes from the Fringes of Film Industry is an Indian English-language non-fiction book written by Roopa Swaminathan. It won the 2004 National Film Award for Best Book on Cinema.
