= Official Monetary and Financial Institutions Forum =

Singaporean think tank

The Official Monetary and Financial Institutions Forum (OMFIF) is an independent think tank organization concerned with central banking, economic policy, and public investment.

OMFIF was co-founded in 2010 by David Marsh, who has subsequently served as its Chairman and CEO. Meghnad Desai, Baron Desai was Chairman of the OMFIF Advisory Board from January 2010 to May 2025. The current Chairman of the OMFIF Advisory Board is Norman Lamont.

OMFIF has offices in London, England, and Singapore.
