= When I Hid My Caste =

1963 anthology of short-stories by Baburao Bagul

- Author: Baburao Bagul
- Original title: जेव्हा मी जात चोरली होती
- Translator: Jerry Pinto (2018, English)
- Language: Marathi
- Genre: Short story collection, Dalit literature
- Publication date: 1963
- Publication place: India
- English publication date: July 10, 2018
- Media type: Print
- Pages: 154

When I Hid My Caste (Marathi: Jevhā Mī Jāt Corlī Hotī) is an anthology of ten short-stories by Indian writer Baburao Bagul. The original stories titled Jevha Mi Jaat Chorli Hoti were written in Marathi and first appeared in a Navyug, a Marathi literary journal, in 1963. The stories were translated into English in 2018 by Jerry Pinto. The book is considered to be one of the most notable works of Bagul and a landmark work of Dalit literature for its raw depiction of the lives of Dalits. The collection features Dalit characters and their struggle, particularly the title story, exploring themes of caste-based discrimation, oppression, identity, and revolt.

Scholars K. Satyanarayana and Susie Tharu noted that the book was hailed as "the epic of Dalits" and that its "brilliant stories gave Dalits the strength to face the painful and humiliating experiences of their wretched lives." The collection established Bagul as a significant literary figure who offered alternative perspectives to the polished depictions of Dalit in mainstream Indian literature. The stories are also regarded as social and political acts of rebellion against caste and inequality.
