= Kishore Kumar: The Ultimate Biography =

2022 book by Anirudha Bhattacharjee

- Author: Anirudha Bhattacharjee and Parthiv Dhar
- Language: English
- Subject: Kishore Kumar
- Genre: Non-fiction
- Publisher: HarperCollins India
- Publication date: 2022
- Publication place: India
- Awards: National Film Award for Best Book on Cinema (2024)

Kishore Kumar: The Ultimate Biography is a book authored by Anirudha Bhattacharjee and Parthiv Dhar, published in 2022 by HarperCollins India. It documents the life and career of Kishore Kumar, a prominent Indian playback singer, actor, and filmmaker known for his versatile voice and contributions to Bollywood. The book covers his journey from his early days in Khandwa, Madhya Pradesh, to his prominence in Indian cinema and music. It received the National Film Award for Best Book on Cinema at the 70th National Film Awards in 2024 for its 2022 edition.

== Background ==
Anirudha Bhattacharjee, an engineer-turned-writer, and Parthiv Dhar, a music historian, are the authors, both of whom have previously written about Indian cinema and music. The biography is based on interviews, archival records, and anecdotes to provide a comprehensive account of Kishore Kumar's life.

== Content ==
The book outlines Kishore Kumar’s life, beginning with his childhood in Khandwa. It details his entry into the Hindi film industry in the 1940s as an actor and singer, and his work as a playback singer, recording over 2,500 songs across various Indian languages. It also covers his acting in comedies and dramas, and his roles as a director, producer, and composer. His personal life, including his four marriages, and his unconventional behaviour in the industry are also discussed. The biography explores his musical collaborations with composers such as S.D. Burman and R.D. Burman, and his versatility across genres like soulful and lively songs. It further notes his eccentric traits, such as his reclusive nature, which distinguished him in Bollywood.

== Reception ==
Critics praised the book for its research and presentation. Hindustan Times noted its appeal to Kishore Kumar fans, citing its focus on his musical talent and personality. The New Indian Express called it a well-researched work that balances his professional and personal aspects. The Hindu Business Line appreciated its factual depth and lesser-known details. The Telegraph India highlighted its coverage of Kumar's varied roles as a singer and actor. The book won the National Film Award for Best Book on Cinema in 2024 for its 2022 publication, as per the Press Information Bureau.
