= The Education of Yuri =

2022 book by Jerry Pinto

- Author: Jerry Pinto
- Publisher: Speaking Tiger Books
- Publication date: September 2022
- ISBN: 9789354472688

The Education of Yuri is a book by Jerry Pinto. It was published in 2022 by Speaking Tiger Books.

== Plot ==
The book is about an orphan child Yuri Fonseca.

== Critical reception and review ==
Keshava Guha of Scroll.in wrote "With the crucial caveat of the prose, the novel The Education of Yuri most reminded me of was written by the patron saint of literary realism: Gustave Flaubert." Uday Bhatia of Live Mint wrote "Like Em And The Big Hoom, The Education of Yuri ends with a drink, a remark, and a single unadorned sentence. A film adaptation might have ended with a scene from a few pages earlier, with Yuri buried in a group hug." and GJV Prasad of The Tribune India wrote "this new novel by Jerry Pinto will be celebrated as a Bombay novel, an old Mumbai marvel. It is clearly rooted in Bombay's topography, in its social geography, in its cultural history. But it is also a novel that speaks to all of us, whoever we are, wherever we are. I don't know if we lose anything by not knowing Bombay or Mumbai but I know that the novel works, in any case, like any good literary work so clearly placed in its time."

The book has been reviewed by Janice Pariat of The Hindu, Abhijeet Tamhane of Loksatta, Shashi Warrier of The Asian Age, Suhit Bombaywala of Hindustan Times, Anish Gawande of The Indian Express and Aditya Mani Jha of India Today.
