= Silent Cinema in India =

2012 non-fiction book written by B D Garga

Silent Cinema in India - A Pictorial Journey
- First edition
- Author: B D Garga
- Language: English
- Publisher: HarperCollins
- Publication date: 2012

Silent Cinema in India - A Pictorial Journey is a 2012 Indian English language non-fiction book, written by B D Garga and published by HarperCollins India. It won the 2012 National Film Award for Best Book on Cinema
