= Pasupuleti Purnachandra Rao =

Indian theatre activist (1948–2019)

Pasupuleti Purna Chandra Rao
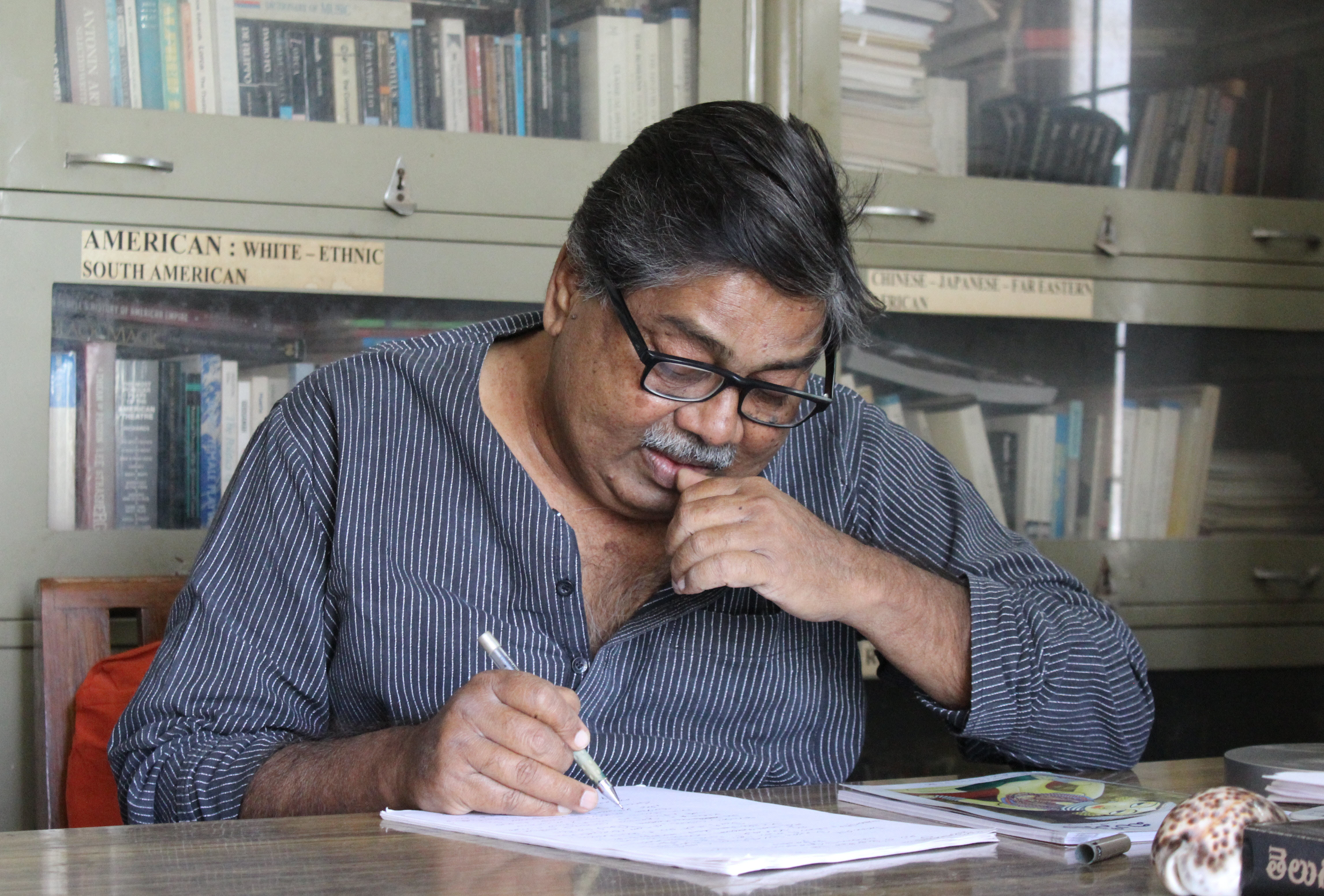
- Born: 22 May 1948; Khammam
- Died: 18 October 2019 (aged 71); Hyderabad
- Education: Osmania University, Hyderabad, Film and Television Institute of India, Pune
- Occupations: Theatre Activist, Film Critic, Cinema Scholar
- Spouse: Lakshmi Tayaru
- Website: https://sites.google.com/site/pasupuletipurnachandrarao/home

Pasupuleti Purna Chandra Rao (May 22, 1948 – October 11, 2019) was an Indian theatre activist, film editor and critic. In 2014, he garnered the National Film Award for Best Book on Cinema for his book on silent cinema titled Silent Cinema (1895–1930) at the 62nd National Film Awards by then President, Pranab Mukherjee.

== Awards ==
National Film Awards

- National Film Award for Best Book on Cinema (2014) – Silent Cinema (1895-1930)
