= Dagdu Maruti Pawar =

Indian Marathi-language poet and author (1935–1996)

Daya Pawar
- Born: 1935
- Died: 20 September 1996 (aged 60–61)
- Occupations: Poet; author
- Notable work: Baluta

Daya Pawar or Dagdu Maruti Pawar (1935–20 September 1996) was an Indian Marathi language author and poet known for his contributions to Dalit literature that dealt with the atrocities experienced by the Dalits or untouchables under the Hindu caste system. He was a Buddhist by religion.

== Early life ==
Daya Pawar (pen name of Dagadu Maroti Pawar) was born in 1935 in Dhamangaon, a village in Ahmednagar district, Maharashtra. He spent his early years in Kawakhana, near Bombay’s Kamathipura area. His father worked as a dock laborer, while his mother was employed as a manual scavenger. Economic hardship forced the family to move between the city and their village. After his father lost his job, Pawar experienced firsthand the rigid caste-based segregation that shaped his formative years.

== Works ==
=== Baluta ===
He gained fame for his autobiographical 1978 novel Baluta (बलुत), written as a story told by Dagdu Pawar to the more literate Daya Pawar, both being personas of the author. The novel recounts the "experiences of an untouchable struggling for a peaceful existence, mentally tormented but incapable of retaliation in word and deed." There was "strong anti-Dalit reaction" when it was published in Maharashtra.

Baluta created ripples in literary circles and earned him many awards at all levels, including one from the Ford Foundation. It got translated into several languages. The strengths of the book are the simple, straightforward and to-the-point portrayal and a transparent realistic illustration of the ethos around him. The book created a new genre in Marathi literature. Many autobiographical books talking about harsh experiences hard realities were written after Baluta. Pawar's use of language is not merely that of revolt but of a deeply introspecting analytical intellectual.

Pu La Deshpande reviewed Baluta: "On reading this book the cataract of blind traditions stuck to our eyes that makes us unaware of facts will melt away in the tears that fill our eyes on seeing this horrifying reality will emerge new rays of hope. Reader will then seek to be more humane henceforth in life, What else is the intent of all good literature? Creating new kinship among mankind and free the society from artificial and vexing bonds, right? The same can be said for all Pawar’s literature."

=== Poetry and other work ===
Although he earned fame through his autobiographical prose in Baluta, poetry was his forte. He gave expression to the oppression of the Dalits through his verse.

"Shilekhali haat hota, tari nahi phodla hambarda,

Kitr janmachi kaid, kuni nirmila ha kondvada"
(The hand was crushed under a stone, yet no outcry was heard

How many generations of imprisonment? Who created this prison?)

With effective verses like the above from his first collections of poems Kondvada, he voiced the atrocities and oppression faced by generations of Dalit. Published in 1974, Kondvada earned him a literary award from the State.

Among his other famous works are Chavdi and Dalit Jaanivaa, two of his compilation of articles, and Vittal, a collection of short stories. He wrote the screenplay for Jabbar Patel's film Dr. Ambedkar. He was appointed with the National Film Development Corporation. Pawar won the prestigious Padma Shri awarded by the Government of India.

Pawar's writing's reflects his active participation in the social, cultural and literary movements on the national level, his avid following of foreign literature, analytical and contemplative thinking, unwavering stance, deep understanding and empathy towards social happenings and issues. His work was highly effective. He received some amount of recognition by way of awards. But due to oppressive circumstances, he suffered mentally and physically in his personal life. It is this perennial suffering that comes through sharply in his writings. One of his poems gives a feel for his suffering:

"Dukhaana gadgadtaana he zhaad me paahilela

Tashi yaachi mule kholvar boudhivrukshaasaarkhi
Boudhivrukshaala phula tari aali
He Zhaad saaryaa rutut kolpun gelela
Dhamani dhamanit phutu paahnaaryaa yaatanaa
Mahaarogyaachyaa botsanssarkhi zadleli paane
He khod kasla? Phandiphandila jakhadleli kubdi
Maran yet naahi mhanun marankalaa sosnaara

Dukhaana gadgadtaanaa he zhaad me paahila"

(I have seen this tree tremble in pain

Albeit the tree has deep roots like the Bodhi tree
The Bodhi tree at least bore flowers
This tree though is withered in all seasons
Pain trying to burst through its very pore
Leaves withered like those of a leper’s fingers
What is this disease? Crutches hung on every branch
Death does not befall and so bearing the pains of death

I have seen this tree tremble in pain)

== Bibliography ==
- Kondwada (A collection of poems) – Pune: Mehata Publishing House, 1974
- Balute (An autobiographical novel) – Bombay: Granthali, 1978 (First Edition), 1988 (Fifth Edition), 1993 (Second Reprint)
- 'Balute' (Hindi translation) – Delhi: Radhakrishna Publisher, 1981
- 'Balute' (German translation) – Frankfurt: Verlay Vvonne Landeck, 1988
- 'Balute' (French translation) – Paris, La Decouverte, 1990
- 'Vital' (A collection of short stories) – Pune: Mehata Publishing House; 1983 (First Edition),1985 (Second Edition)
- 'Chawdi' (A collection of essays) – Pune: Mehata Publishing House:1983 (First Edition), 1992 (Second Edition)
- 'Balute-Ek, Wadal' (A collection of letters an analytical critique)
- 'Kallapa Yeshwant Dhale Yanchi Diary—1911-1924' (Edited work) – Maharashtra State Sahitya and Sanskruti Mandal, 1984
- 'Dhammapad' (Translation in lyric form in Marathi from Pali Dhammapad) – Pune: Deshmukh & Co., 1991
- 'Pasang' (Columns) – Lokasatta, 1993–1994
- 'Dr Babasaheb Ambedkar' (Documentary film) – Screenplay by the author: Film Division, 1993
- 'Dr Ambedkar' (Documentary film) – Screenplay by the author: NFDC

== Chronology ==
- 1935 Birth
- 1956 Joined as a clerk as well as a laboratory assistant in a veterinary college, Mumbai
- 1967 First Dalit poem published in Asmitadarsh
- 1968 Took active part in Dalit literature movement
- 1969 First article on Dalit literature published in Pratisthan
- 1972 Attended World Buddhist Conference in Colombo, Sri Lanka
- 1975 Maharashtra Government Award for Kondwada
- 1979 Maharashtra Government Award for Balute
- 1982 Ford Foundation Fellowship, visited USA
- 1984 Visited World Book Fair at Frankfurt and read a paper on Dalit literature
- 1988-94 Member of textbook committee 'Bal Bharti'
- 1987-94 Member of Dr. Babasaheb Ambedkar Source Material Publication Committee, Maharashtra State
- 1990 Received Padmashri
- 1993 Chairman Drama Pre-scrutiny Board, Maharashtra State
- 1996 20 December, died in New Delhi.

== See also ==
- List of Padma Shri award recipients (1990–99)
