= M. V. Pylee =

Indian scholar

- Born: 5 October 1922; Pulinkunnoo, Kerala, India
- Died: 30 December 2017 (aged 95); Kochi, Kerala
- Occupations: Educationist, scholar, author
- Awards: Padma Bhushan
- Website: mvpylee.com

Moolamattom Varkey Pylee (5 October 1919 - 30 December 2017) was an Indian scholar, educationist and management guru, considered by many as the father of management education in Kerala and an authority on Constitutional Law. He was awarded Padmabhushan in 2006 by Government of India for his contributions to the fields of education and management.

== Biography ==
M. V. Pylee was born in Pulinkunnoo on 5 October 1919.

His wife, Elsie Pylee, died in 2004. An award has been instituted by Cochin University of Science and Technology, the M. V. Pylee Award, given once in three years, carrying a cash prize of Rs 200,000, a memento and citation for excellence in teaching and research and contribution to academic community.

Cochin University of Science and Technology, St. Berchman's College, Changanacherry, St. Joseph's School Pulimkunnu, St. Agnus College, Mangalore, Kerala Higher Education Trust, Good Samaritan project, India and others have benefitted from the Trust endowments.

== Works ==
M. V. Pylee authored several books in English and Malayalam.

=== In English ===
Title	Publisher	Year
India's Constitution	Asia Publishing House	1962
Industrial Relations & Personal Management		
Constitutional Amendments in India	Universal Law Publishing Co.	2003
Select Constitutions of the World	Universal Law Publishing Co.	2004
Constitutions of the World	Universal Law Publishing Company	2000
Professional Management in India. Problems and Prospects	S. Chand and Company	
Constitutional Government in India	Asia Publishing House	
Introduction to the Constitution of India	Vikas Publishing House	
Essentials of Material Management	Somaiya Publications	
Worker Participation in management : Myth and Reality	N.V. Publications	1978
Russia of My Experience	East West Publications	1976
Industrial Policy	Administrative staff College of India, Hyderabad	1963
Constitutional History of India	Asia Publishing House	1967
International Joint Business Ventures	Columbia University Press	1962
Federal Court of India	Vikas Publishing House	1966
Crisis, Conscience and the Constitution	Asia publishing House	1982
Emerging Trends in Indian Polity	Regency Publications	1998
Coir Industry: Problems and Prospects	Coir Board	1977
Our Constitution, Government and Politics	Universal Law Publishing Company	2000
An Introduction to the Constitution of India	Mathrubhumi	1984
An Introduction to Managerial Economics	S. Chand & Co.	1979

=== In Malayalam ===
- Sevanathinte Rajapathayil – Autobiography
- Russiayile Kazchakalum Anubhavangalum
- Vidybhyasa Prasnangal, Innale, Innu, Naale
- Managementil Thozilali Pankalitham
- Videshathuninnum Kure Kathukal
- Indian Bharanaghatana
- Rashtrapathi Prathikuttil
- Indiayude Bharanaghatana Charitram
- Unnata Vidyabhyasam Punarudharikkan
- Bharathathinte Bharanaghatanakku Oru Amukham
- Vyavasayam Americayil
- Indian Rashtriyathile Nootana Pravanatakal
- Tourism Americayil

He also published over 200 research papers in various journals.

== Awards ==
- Fulbright Smith-mundt Scholar at Harvard University (1953–54).
