= Jerry Pinto =

Indian writer and poet (born 1966)

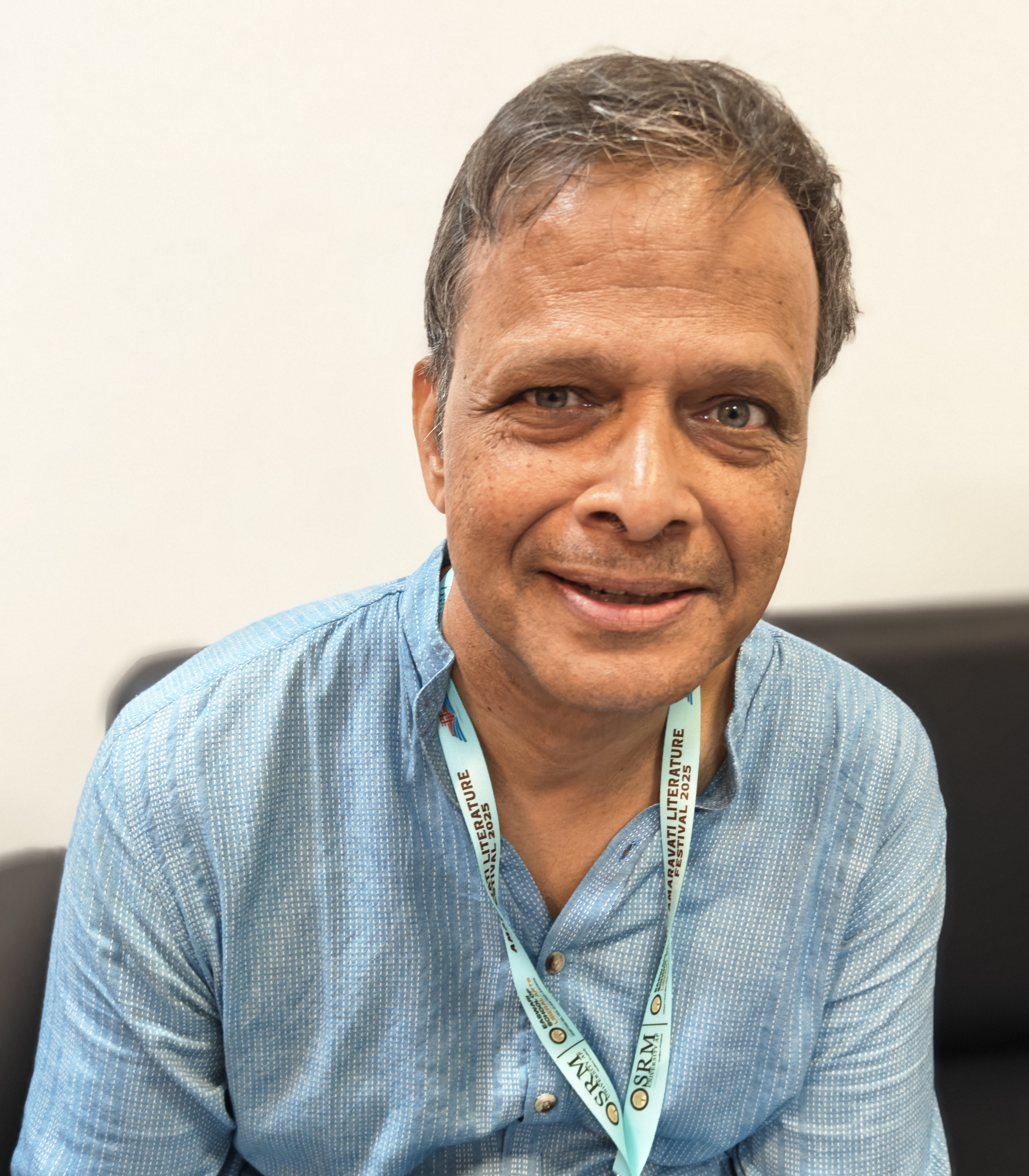
- Pinto at Amaravati Literature Festival, 2025
- Born: 22 May 1966 (age 60); Goa, India
- Occupations: Poet; novelist; short story writer; translator; journalist
- Known for: Em and the Big Hoom (2012)
- Awards: National Film Award for Best Book on Cinema (2007); The Hindu Literary Prize (2012); Crossword Book Award (2013); Windham–Campbell Literature Prizes (2016); Sahitya Akademi (2016)

Jerry Pinto (born Jeronimo Pinto, 22 May 1966) is an Indian poet, novelist, short story writer, translator, and journalist based in Mumbai, India. He writes in English. Pinto's works include Helen: The Life and Times of an H-Bomb (2006), which won the Best Book on Cinema Award at the 54th National Film Awards, as well as Surviving Women (2000) and Asylum and Other Poems (2003). His first novel Em and the Big Hoom was published in 2012. Pinto won the Windham-Campbell Literature Prize for Fiction in 2016. He was awarded the Sahitya Akademi Award in 2016 for his novel Em and the Big Hoom.

== Early life ==
Jerry Pinto was born in Goa, India. He is a Roman Catholic. He grew up in Mahim, Bombay. Pinto received a liberal arts degree from Elphinstone College, University of Mumbai, and a law degree from Government Law College, Mumbai.

== Career ==
Pinto's 2006 book about the Indian actress Helen titled The Life and Times of an H-Bomb, won the National Film Award for Best Book on Cinema in 2007.

His collection of poems, Asylum and Other Poems, was released in 2003. He also co-edited Confronting Love (2005) with Arundhathi Subramaniam, a book of contemporary Indian love poetry in English.

He returned to journalism as a consulting editor at Man's World magazine. Later, he joined Paprika Media to edit their special projects. He is now a freelance journalist, writing articles for the Hindustan Times and Live Mint newspapers, as well as The Man and MW.

In 2009, he co-authored Leela: A Portrait with Leela Naidu, a semi-biographical book of anecdotes and photos from Naidu's life.

His first novel, Em and the Big Hoom, was published in 2012, and won The Hindu Literary Prize that year. It was also shortlisted for the Commonwealth Book Prize in 2013. It won the Windham–Campbell Literature Prize in Fiction in 2016.

He has translated several books from Marathi to English including Cobalt Blue, Baluta, When I Hid My Caste and I, the Salt Doll. He translated the novel Havan (The Fire Sacrifice, 1989) by Susham Bedi from Hindi to English.

== Bibliography ==
- Surviving Women. Penguin Books, 2000. ISBN 0-14-028715-9.
- Bombay, meri jaan: writings on Mumbai (with Naresh Fernandes). Penguin Books, 2003.
- Asylum and Other Poems. Allied Publishers India., 2003. ISBN 81-7764-527-7
- Confronting Love, (edited with Arundhathi Subramaniam). Penguin Books India., 2005. ISBN 0-14-303264-X
- Helen: The Life and Times of an H-Bomb. New Delhi: Penguin Books India, 2006. ISBN 0-14-303124-4.
- Reflected in Water: Writings on Goa. Penguin Group, 2006. ISBN 0-14-310081-5.
- Bollywood Posters, with Sheena Sippy. Thames & Hudson, 2008. ISBN 9780500287767
- Leela: A Patchwork Life (with Leela Naidu). Penguin Group, 2009. ISBN 9780670999118
- Em and the Big Hoom. Aleph Book Company, 2012. ISBN 8192328023
- Phiss Phuss Boom (with Anushka Ravishankar and Sayoni Basu; illustrated by Vinayak Varma). Duckbill, 2013. ISBN 978-93-83331-08-6
- When Crows Are White, 2013. ISBN 9788184778571
- Monster Garden (illustrated by Priya Kuriyan). Duckbill, 2016. ISBN 978-93-83331-26-0
- Murder in Mahim, 2017. ISBN 9789385755293
- The Education of Yuri. Speaking Tiger Books, 2022. ISBN 9789354472688
- Citizen Gallery: The Gandhys of Chemould and the birth of modern art in Bombay, 2022

== Awards and honours ==
- 2007 National Film Award for Best Book on Cinema for Helen: The Life and Times of an H-Bomb
- 2012 The Hindu Literary Prize for Em and the Big Hoom
- 2013 Crossword Book Award for Em and the Big Hoom
- 2016 Windham–Campbell Literature Prize in Fiction for Em and The Big Hoom
- 2016 Sahitya Akademi Award for Em and The Big Hoom
