= Kishwar Desai =

Indian author and columnist (born 1956)

Kishwar Rosha, Lady Desai
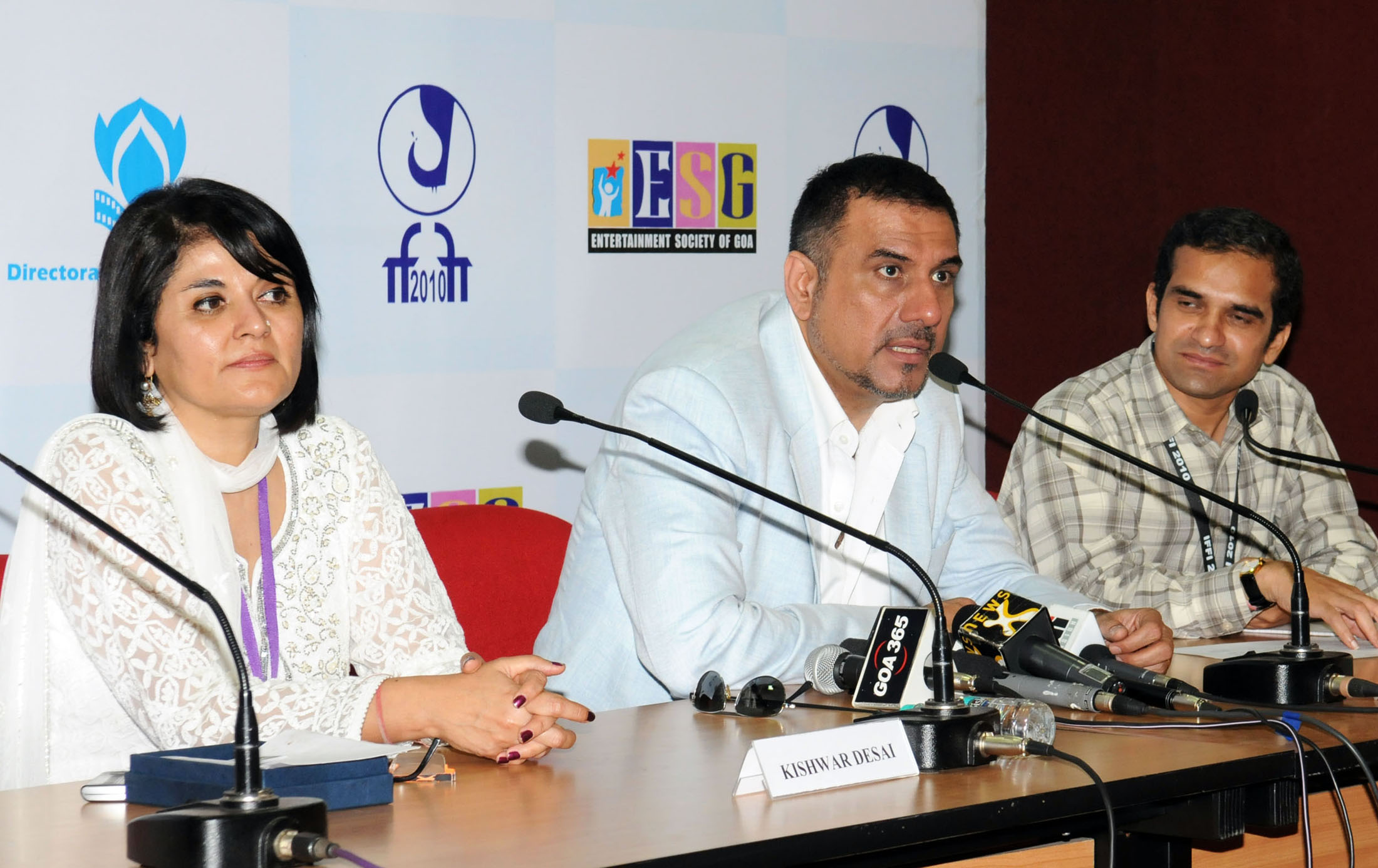
- Desai at IFFI (2010)
- Born: Kishwar Rosha; 1 December 1956 (age 69); Ambala, Haryana, India
- Education: Lady Shri Ram College
- Occupation: Author
- Spouse: Lord Desai (m. 2004; died 2025)
- Children: 2
- Website: www.kishwardesai.com

Kishwar, Lady Desai (née Rosha; formerly Ahluwalia; born 1 December 1956) is an Indian author and columnist. Her first novel, Witness the Night, won the Costa Book Award in 2010 for Best First Novel and has been translated into over 25 languages. It was also shortlisted for the Author's Club First Novel Award and longlisted for the Man Asian Literary Prize. Her novel Origins of Love, published in June 2012, was critically acclaimed. The Sea of Innocence, published in 2014 in India as well as in the UK and Australia, was widely discussed as it dealt with the issue of gang rape. Desai also has a biography, Darlingji: The True Love Story of Nargis and Sunil Dutt, to her credit.

== Early life and education ==
Born Kishwar Rosha on 1 December 1956 in Ambala, Punjab (now Haryana) to Padam and Rajini Rosha. She grew up in Chandigarh, where her father was the head of Punjab Police, and graduated from Lady Shri Ram College in 1977, in Economics (Hons).

== Career ==
She started her career as a print journalist and worked as a political reporter with the Indian Express moving on to television and broadcast media after a while, where she worked for over two decades. She worked as anchor, TV producer and head of a TV channel with some of the major Indian television networks. She was also the Vice President at Zee Telefilms (Zee TV).

She anchored Doordarshan's morning show, Good Morning Today, after which she took over as the CEO of Tara Punjabi TV channel, a part of Broadcast Worldwide, which was established by former STAR TV head, Rathikant Basu. She has written for The Guardian.

== Literary career ==
Her award-winning novel Witness the Night, was the first in the series featuring the feisty Indian middle-aged social worker-cum-crime investigator, Simran Singh. In a small town in the heart of India, a young girl, barely alive, is found in a sprawling house where thirteen people lie dead. The girl is charged with the murders and Simran is now her only hope. The judges of the Costa Award (Anita Rani, Anneka Rice and Mark Thornton) said "Kishwar Desai pulls off a remarkable trick, transplanting a country-house murder to modern-day India in a book that's not afraid to tackle serious themes". Witness the Night was also shortlisted for the Author's Club First Novel Award and longlisted for the 2009 Man Asian Literary Prize. In 2020, The Independent's Emma Lee-Potter listed it as one of the 12 best Indian novels, calling it a "stunning debut".

In Origins of Love, Desai took a close look at surrogacy and adoption. Simran Singh is asked to examine the case of an abandoned baby at an IVF clinic and what follows is a maze of new age fertility rites, and surrogacy. Desai's third novel in the series is The Sea of Innocence.

Prior to writing fiction, Desai wrote a probing yet affectionate biography of Nargis and Sunil Dutt, two iconic Indian film stars, in Darlingji: The True Love Story of Nargis and Sunil Dutt. The book based on interviews with the Dutt family and friends, explored their lives in detail and tells the larger story of the evolution of Hindi cinema, and of a society and a nation in the throes of change. Desai has also written a play, Manto!, based on the life of the famous Urdu writer, Saadat Hasan Manto, which won the TAG Omega Award for Best Play in 1999. She was working on taking the Partition Museum forward and on a new book on Indian cinema. Desai also released a book in 2020, called The Longest Kiss which is the story of Bombay Talkies founder and actress Devika Rani.

== Personal life ==
After her first marriage, she changed her name to Kishwar Ahluwalia and has a son, Gaurav and a daughter, Malika from the marriage. On 20 July 2004, after a divorce, she married economist Meghnad Desai, a member of the British House of Lords. They were together for 21 years, until his death in July 2025.

== Works ==
- The Longest Kiss: The Life and Times of Devika Rani. Westland, 2020. ISBN 9789389152470
- The Sea of Innocence. Simon & Schuster Limited, 2013. ISBN 9781471101427
- Origins of Love. Simon & Schuster Limited, 2013. ISBN 9781471111228
- Witness the Night, 2009; Simon & Schuster UK, 2012. ISBN 9781471101526
- Darlingji: The True Love Story of Nargis and Sunil Dutt. HarperCollins India, 2007. ISBN 9788172236977
