= Baluta (autobiography) =

Autobiography of Daya Pawar

Baluta (Marathi बलुतं) is an autobiography by the Indian writer Daya Pawar, written in the Marathi language. According to Kalita, Baluta "introduced autobiographical writing" to Dalit literature. Baluta is seen by the Encyclopaedia of Indian Literature as an attempt by the writer to be personal yet "objective and representative", the title generalising the status of rural untouchables. It records the writer's struggle for peace, a struggle with no chance of retaliation in "word or deed". An English translation by Jerry Pinto was published in 2015.

== Reactions ==
Rao considers that Baluta, as a representative of Dalit literature, was not just a faithful narration of the Dalit experience but also an "ethical challenge" to the "caste Hindu" whom it "implicated". Sharmila Rege quotes Urmila Pawar, who mentions the criticism of Dalit scholars that Baluta was shameful; Urmila rejects this criticism as based on lack of understanding. According to The Encyclopaedia..., it created the first anti-hero in Marathi literature. Link mentions that Baluta "created a sensation in the Marathi world for its frank and unique description of a life that the author lived in the ghettos of prostitutes, criminals, pimps and uprooted Dalit people, within and around the red light areas of the city of Bombay."
