= Sharayu Daftary =

Indian industrialist (1933–2025)

- Born: 1933; Mumbai, Maharashtra, India
- Died: May 2025 (aged 91–92)
- Occupation: Industrialist
- Spouse: Arvind Gaurishankar Daftary
- Children: Three daughters
- Parent(s): Lalchand Hirachand; Lalitabai
- Awards: Padma Shri; Jain Ratna Award

Sharayu Daftary (1933 – May 2025) was an Indian industrialist and a former president of the Indian Merchants' Chamber (IMC), the first elected president of the organization. She was the first woman president of the Automotive Components Manufacturers Association and the first woman to sit in the executive committee of the Federation of Indian Chambers of Commerce and Industry (FICCI). She was the founder of Bharat Radiators Limited and the president of the Dakshin Bharat Jain Sabha. The Government of India awarded her the fourth highest civilian honour of the Padma Shri, in 2004, for her contributions to the Indian industry.

== Biography ==
Sharayu Daftary, née Sharayu Hirachand Doshi, was born in 1933, in a rich Mumbai business family to Lalitabai and Lalchand Hirachand, a Padma Shri awardee and the brother of Walchand Hirachand, the founder of Walchand Group and one of the pioneers of Indian industry. She graduated in Economics (BA) from Elphinstone College, Mumbai and married Arvind Gaurishankar Daftary at the age of 19. She was denied entry into the family business as women were not allowed by tradition, and she founded Bharat Radiators Limited, an auto parts manufacturing concern, with a capital of ₹200,000 and five workers, in 1958 when she was only 25 and has been the managing director of the business ever since.

Daftary had been active in the Indian industrial scene and when she was elected as the president of the Automotive Components Manufacturers Association of India (ACMA) in 1971, she became the first woman to elected to the post. She also had the distinction of being the first woman president of the Indian Merchants' Chamber (IMC) (1981) and the first woman to be selected as a member of the executive committee of the Federation of Indian Chambers of Commerce and Industry (FICCI). She would preside over the IMC for second time, in 2000. A Jain by birth, she was the president of the Dakshin Bharat Jain Sabha and was the editor of Jain Bodhak, a fortnightly magazine founded by her grand father and the mouthpiece of Jain community.

Daftary was a recipient of the Jain Ratna Award of the Jain Samaj and had been awarded the civilian honour of the 2004 Padma Shri by the Government of India. The Daftary couple has three daughters, the eldest daughter, Czaee Shah, is a restaurateur, Gauri Pohomal is an entrepreneur and philanthropist and the youngest, Kavita Khanna, is a homemaker and was married to actor Vinod Khanna. Saryu Doshi, the renowned art historian and Padma Shri awardee, is her sister-in-law, by marriage to her brother, Vinod Doshi.

Sharayu Daftary died on May 2025, at the age of 91–92. The International School for Jain Studies (ISJS) issued an obituary tribute in its May 2025 newsletter, describing her death with profound sadness and recognizing her as a pioneering force in Indian industry and a devoted patron of the Jain community.

== See also ==
- Lalchand Hirachand
- Walchand Hirachand
- Walchand group
