= Hirachand =

Hirachand may refer to:

- Gulabchand Hirachand, Indian industrialist
- Lalchand Hirachand, Indian industrialist
- Ratanchand Hirachand, Indian industrialist
- Walchand Hirachand, Indian industrialist
- Gaurishankar Hirachand Ojha, Indian author
- Dhirubhai Ambani, Indian industrialist, born Dhirajlal Hirachand Ambani
- Hirachand Punumchand v Temple, court case
