= Walchand =

Walchand may refer to:

- Walchand Hirachand
- Walchand group
- Walchand College of Engineering, Sangli
