= Ratanchand Hirachand =

Ratanchand Hirachand Doshi (1902–1981) was a scion of Walchand group, an industrialist, philanthropist, freedom fighter, and Jain social leader.

== Biography ==
He was son of Hirachand Doshi from his second marriage and was half-brother of Walchand Hirachand, who was born from the first marriage of his father. He was born into a Jain family in Solapur, Maharashtra. He has two brothers Gulabchand Hirachand and Lalchand Hirachand.

When he grew up he joined his brother, Walchand and served various group companies like The Scindia Steam Navigation Company Ltd., Walchandnagar Industries, Hindustan Aeronautics Limited, Ravalgaon Sugar, Hindustand Construstion, and Premier Automobiles Limited. In 1931, when Walchand floated The Indian Hume Pipe Company, he made Ratanchand its Director-in-charge. Further, he headed Walchand group, Cooper Engineering for several years.

He also served on various committees and planning commission in the 1940s. He published several books on the Jain religion of which the book titled The Religion of Ahimsa published in 1957 is noted one. He published in the Marathi, as well in Hindi, biographies on his father Seth Hirachand Nemchand and others like Dinanath Bapuji, Magudkar.

He was trustee of various schools, colleges and hospitals run by Walchand group.

He is survived by a son, Rajas Doshi, who heads The Indian Hume Pipe Company.
