= Gulabchand =

Gulabchand is a both a surname and given name. Notable people with the name include:

- Ajit Gulabchand
- Gulabchand Hirachand
