= Walchand group =

Business organization

Walchand group is an Indian business organisation that came into existence in the 20th century, founded by industrialist Walchand Hirachand Doshi.

Walchand Hirachand founded several companies, some of which were among the firsts in India in their fields.

== Industry ==
- Premier Construction Limited – founded as Walchand-Phatak Co in year 1903. for some time known as Tata Construction – after exit of Tatas name changed to Premier – doing contract and construction business.
- Walchandnagar Industries Limited - founded in 1908 as sugar factory diversified into defence and strategic equipments, now headed by Chakor L. Doshi, son of Lalchand Hirachand
- The Scindia Steam Navigation Company Ltd. – founded 1919. After Walchand's death run by Narottam Morarjee – now almost defunct.
- Hindustan Shipyard Limited – founded in 1940 nationalized by Government of India in 1961.
- Hindustan Aeronautics Limited – founded in 1940 nationalized by British India in 1942.
- Hindustan Construction Company – founded in 1926, civil & engineering construction giant now headed by Ajit Gulabchand faction.
- Premier Automobiles Limited who manufactures car like Premier Padmini and others – founded in 1944.
- Ravalgaon Sugar Farms Limited – sugar & confectionery giant founded in 1933.
- Indian Hume Pipe Company Limited – founded in 1926.
- Cooper Engineering Limited – an engineering products company founded in 1940.
- Acrow India Limited – founded in 1960.
- Studio Walchand – a film studio at Bombay founded by Walchand Hirachand.

== Institutes ==
- Walchand Institute of Technology

Walchand Hirachand was assisted by his brothers, when they grew up. As Walchand died without any direct male descendants, the group was divided amongst sons of his brothers Gulabchand Hirachand, Lalchand Hirachand & Ratanchand Hirachand, who operated together till they were alive. The group, however, in general is referred to as Walchand group in media.

Walchand group is now largely bifurcated between two factions - one headed by Ajit Gulabchand son of Gulabchand Hirachand and other faction by sons of Lalchand and Ratanchand. Walchand College of Engineering is an autonomous engineering education institute in the city of Sangli, Maharashtra, India. The WCE campus is situated on nearly 90 acres of land in Vishrambag, roughly midway between the twin cities of Sangli and Miraj.

- Walchand College of Engineering, Sangli

The college was established in 1947 by the Hon. (Late) Dhondumama Sathe and began with an undergraduate course in Civil Engineering with a capacity of 60 students. It was affiliated with Bombay University in 1947. After Pune University was set up in 1948, the college became affiliated with Pune University. In 1955, the college was renamed after Walchand Hirachand, an industrialist. Since the establishment of Shivaji University, at Kolhapur in 1962, Walchand College of Engineering, Sangli has been affiliated with Shivaji University. Since 2007, it has been an autonomous college offering the B.Tech. degree (vs the B.E degree) along with Veermata Jijabai Technological Institute, Mumbai (VJTI), College of Engineering, Pune (CoEP), Shri Guru Gobind Singhji Institute of Engineering and Technology (SGGS) and Sardar Patel College of Engineering (SPCE) in Maharashtra with 'financial and academic autonomy'
