= Lalchand Hirachand =

Indian politician

Lalchand Hirachand Doshi (24 October 1904 – 1993) was a scion of Walchand group, noted industrialist, philanthropist and Jain social leader.

He was the youngest son of Hirachand Doshi from his second marriage and was half-brother of Walchand Hirachand, who was born from first marriage of his father. He was born in Solapur Maharashtra into a Jain family. Name of his other brothers were Gulabchand Hirachand and Ratanchand Hirachand.

He completed his Bachelor of Arts degree from Deccan College, Pune. He was admitted to the Middle Temple in London on 12 November 1926, but withdrew without being Called to the Bar on 8 November 1928. He married Lalitabai in June 1931, with whom he had three sons and a daughter.

When he grew up he joined his brother, Walchand and served its various group companies including The Scindia Steam Navigation Company Ltd., Walchandnagar Industries, Hindustan Aeronautics Limited, Ravalgaon Sugar, Hindustan Construction Company, and Premier Automobiles Limited. He later served also as president of the Indian Merchants' Chamber and various other merchant bodies.

He also served as president of All India Digamber Jain Tirthakshetra Committee from 1972 to 1983, and was connected to a number of charitable institutions. He is also the author an acclaimed book on Ramayana named as The Indian epic – Ramayana.

He was elected as an independent candidate as member of the Bombay Legislative Council, in 1939. After India's independence, he also became a member of the Rajya Sabha from 1952 to 1958.

He was elected as the president of the Mechanical Engineers Association (India), Bombay for 1964–65 Session.

A sports aficionado, he was a member of the Cricket Club of India, the Willingdon Sports Club and various similar institutions. In addition, he was an avid golfer. He won the Dunlop Trophy for Golf and enjoyed playing tennis, badminton and bridge. He held a commercial pilot's license.

He died in October, 1993. Walchandnagar Industries is now run his sons Vinod Doshi, Chakor L. Doshi and others, whereas other companies went to sons of Gulabchand Hirachand, after family division of businesses, as the founder of the group Walchand Hirachand died without any male heirs.

He was trustee of various schools, colleges and hospitals run by Walchand group.

He was awarded with the Padma Shri award by the Government of India in 1992 for his contributions to trade and industry.
