= SkyHive =

SkyHive Technologies Inc. is a cloud-based workforce management and reskilling software provider founded by Sean Hinton and Sergiy Osypchuk in 2017. It has headquarters in Vancouver, Canada, and offices in California, United States. Its platform matches employees' skill gaps against job and future job requirements, identifies career pathways, and recommends training. This connects workers to new opportunities within and outside their current organizations.

In November 2020, the company raised $8 million in a Series A funding round led by AllegisCyber Capital with participation from Accenture, Workday Ventures, and the Partnership Fund for New York City.

The following year, in October 2021, SkyHive raised $40 million in a Series B funding round led by Eldridge with participation from other investors such as Allegis Cyber, Accenture Ventures, Workday Ventures, and the Partnership Fund for New York City.

== Awards and accolades ==
In 2018, SkyHive was selected for the Innovation for Defence Excellence and Security (IDEaS) Program created by the Canadian Armed Forces (CAF) to help increase the recruitment and retention of women to reach 25% representation by 2026.

SkyHive was awarded a B Corporation certification in June 2019.

In September 2020, CIX Canadian Innovation Exchange announced SkyHive as one of the CIX Top 20 Early and CIX Top 10 Growth innovative Canadian technology startups.

In November 2020, SkyHive won the Technology Impact Award under the "Spirit of BC Tech – Purpose" category.

In May 2021, SkyHive was recognized by Gartner in the Cool Vendor in the Human Capital Management: Technology Innovations, to support the future of work report.

In June 2021, SkyHive was named as a Technology Pioneer by the World Economic Forum.

== Partnerships ==
In March 2020, Accenture formed a strategic partnership with SkyHive for Project Spotlight. As part of the project, startups that address areas of large-scale strategic importance are selected to help fill innovation gaps for the Global 2000s. These areas include closing employee skills gaps, data sovereignty, the future of work, edge systems at scale, and predictive systems.

At the World Economic Forum’s Jobs Reset Summit in October 2020, Leena Nair, Unilever's Chief Human Resources Officer, announced a “first of its kind” collaborative partnership with Walmart, Accenture, and SkyHive to create “reskilling and redeployment pathways” for roles in the consumer goods industry. In April 2021, Accenture published a report on the findings and results of the project. Unilever published an article detailing the results of the project, with Unilever's VP Future of Work, Patrick Hull noting, "What the pilot has taught us is that AI and data analytics give us solid grounds for having an optimistic view about the future of work and the opportunities for reskilling".

World Education Services and SkyHive implemented a project to test the feasibility of converting academic credential information into skills-based data. This project highlighted the mismatch between labor market supply and demand and the need to address inefficiencies in the labor market.

TECHNATION partnered with SkyHive to develop Career Finder, a "one-of-a-kind, real-time data hub that provides all of the labor market insights available to today’s growing cybersecurity industry" under the guidance of the Tri-sector Cybersecurity Talent Alliance. The project was partly funded by the Government of Canada's Sectoral Initiatives Program.
