= Ajit Gulabchand =

Indian industrialist

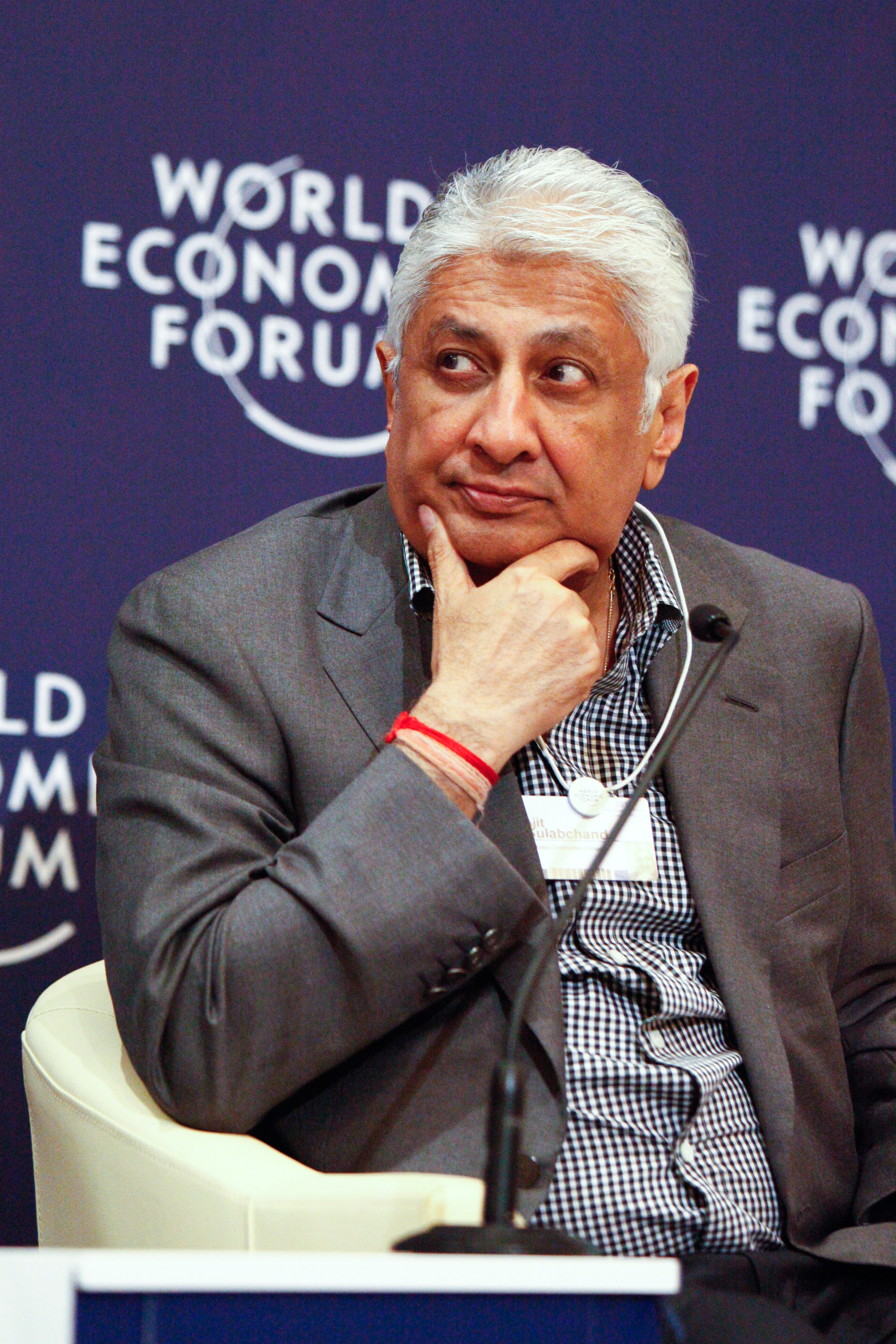
- Ajit Gulabchand at the World Economic Forum on East Asia in Jakarta, 2011
- Born: Maharashtra
- Occupation: Industrialist
- Father: Gulabchand Hirachand

Ajit Gulabchand (born 1948) is an Indian industrialist. Gulabchand is the chairman of Hindustan Construction Company (HCC). He had served as the Chairman and Managing Director of HCC for the past four decades till 2023. He is also a founder member of the Construction Federation of India (CFI). Gulabchand serves as chairman of the board of governance at National Institute of Construction Management & Research (NICMAR) and as chairman of Walchand College of Engineering, Sangli.

== Early and personal life ==
Gulabchand was born to a Digambar Jain trading family, originally belonging to Wankaner in the Kathiawar region of Gujarat, which had settled by the early 20th century in Solapur, Maharashtra. He is the son of Gulabchand Hirachand (1896-1967), one of the four brothers who founded the Walchand group, a business conglomerate which flourished in the first half of the 20th century. Ajit has eight brothers and sisters, and his eldest sibling is twenty-eight years older than him. He was nineteen years old when his father died in 1967. The surname of the family is "Doshi," but this is rarely used. Art historian Saryu Doshi was a relative of Ajit Gulabchand through her husband, Vinod Doshi.

Ajit Gulabchand is married to Meera Gulabchand, daughter of film-maker Vasant Joglekar and actress Sumati Gupte Joglekar. They have a daughter named Shalaka Gulabchand Dhawan.

== Career ==
Gulabchand joined Hindustan Construction Company (HCC) in 1983 as Managing Director and became Chairman in 1994. Under his leadership, HCC evolved into a diversified infrastructure conglomerate with global operations with turnover exceeding 10,670 crore (~1.23 Bn USD) with a workforce of over 13,000 employees. Gulabchand has been a director of Indian Hume Pipe since 1993. He has served as director of HCC Infotech, Hincon Technoconsult, Ucchar Investments, Hincon Realty, LAVASA Corporation, Motorsports Association of India, Steiner, Constructmall.com, and as an independent, non-executive director of Bajaj Electricals.

He continues to serve as a Director in Hincon Finance, Hincon Holdings, Western Securities, Champali Garden, Shalaka Investment, and Gulabchand Foundation.

He is a founding member of the World Economic Forum's Disaster Resource Network and a member of the National Council of Confederation of Indian Industry (CII). He was a promoter of the Lavasa township, which was intended to be India's first new hill station since independence.

== Achievements and Recognitions ==
Ajit Gulabchand received the Lifetime Achievement Award at the 9th ET NOW Infra Focus Summit and Awards 2024. He has also served as -

- Founder‑member and past President of the Construction Federation of India (CFI).
- Served on the CII National Council and chaired PPP and urbanization committees.
- First Asian to chair the Steering Board for Engineering & Construction at WEF (2011); Co-chaired India Economic Summit (2010).
- Founded the Disaster Resource Network with WEF and UN in 1999 and heads Indian chapter.
- First Indian signatory to UN CEO Water Mandate, advocating water sustainability.
- Member of TERI’s Business Council, IFAWPCA President (2011–12), and WEF Climate Leaders group.

== Education ==
Gulabchand graduated from Sydenham College, Mumbai University, with a bachelor's degree in commerce.
