= Gulabchand Hirachand =

Indian businessman (1898–1967)

Gulabchand Hirachand Doshi (1896–1967) was scion of Walchand group, noted industrialist, philanthropist and a Nationalist.

== Background ==
Gulabchand was a son of Hirachand Doshi from his second marriage and was half-brother of Walchand Hirachand, who was born from the first marriage of his father. He was born in Solapur, Bombay Presidency on September 23, 1896 into a Jain family, who originally hailed from Wankaner in Gujarat. The name of his other brothers were Lalchand Hirachand and Ratanchand Hirachand.

=== Activist ===
From the years 1944–1945 Gulabchand was President of the Maharashtra Hindu Sabha and close associate of Vinayak Damodar Savarkar. In the 1930s, he was imprisoned by British for his nationalist activities

=== Walchandnagar Industries ===
Gulabchand was responsible for the modernization and transformation of the flagship group company, Walchandnagar Industries, from growing sugarcane to diversification into other core manufacturing businesses, when he was given charge of the company by his brother Walchand Hirachand.

=== Family ===
Several sons were born from Gulabchand's two marriages of which Bahubali Gulabchand and Ajit Gulabchand are noted and Ajit now heads several group companies including flagship, HCC Limited. Whereas the other flagship company, Walchandnagar Industries is now run by sons of his brother, Lalchand Hirachand, after family division of businesses, as the founder of the Walchand group, Walchand Hirachand died without any heirs.

=== Other works ===
Gulabchand was the trustee of various schools, colleges and hospitals run by Walchand group.

Further, he was the author of several book about the Jain religion like Kunda-Kunda Prabhrita sangraha. Volume 9 of Jivaraja Jaina Granthamālā. Authors, Kunda Kunda, Gulabchand Hirachand Doshi, Kailash Chandra Jain
