= Leena Nair =

Indian businesswoman (born 1969)

Leena Nair CBE
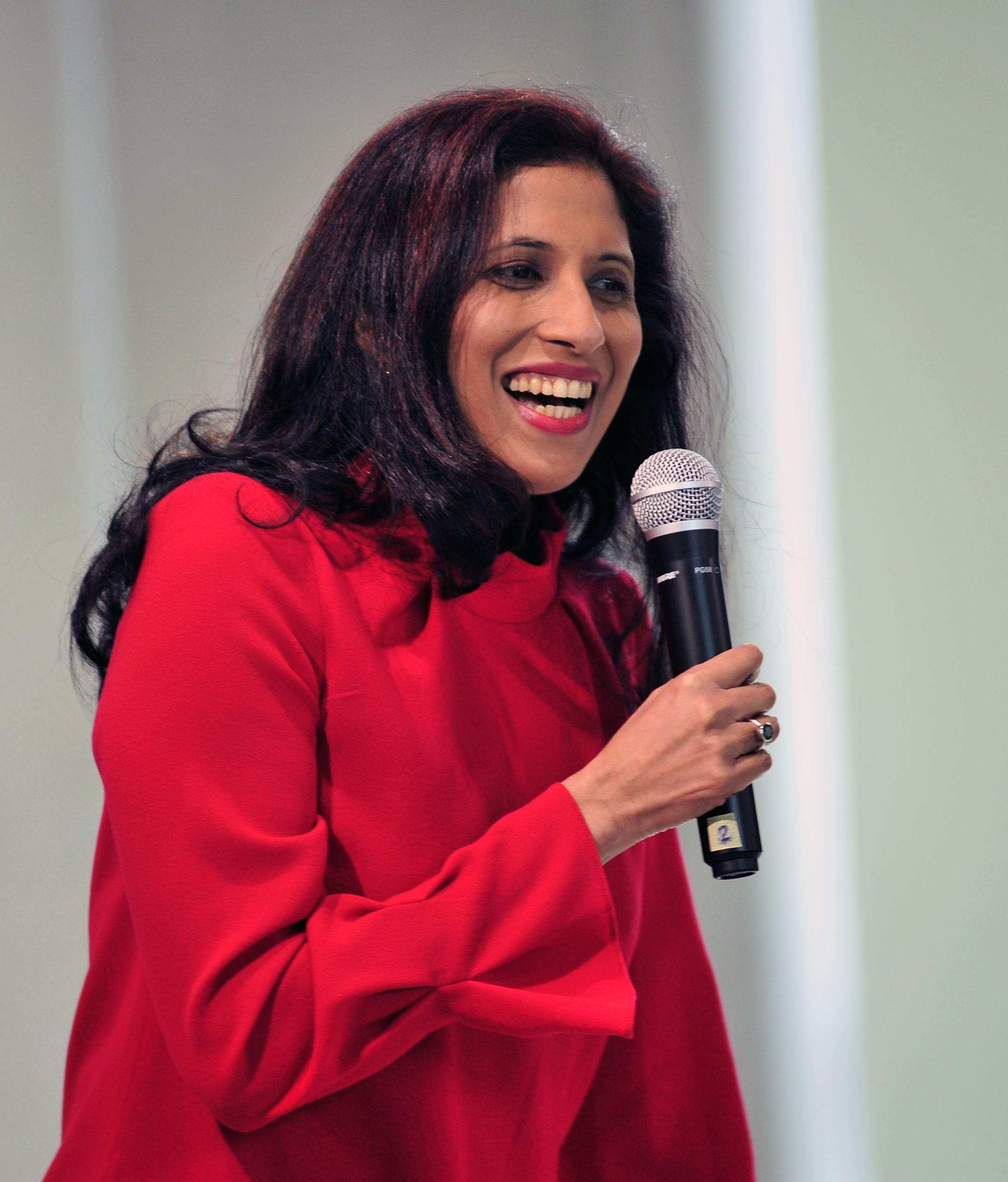
- Nair in 2022
- Born: June 11, 1969 (age 57); Kolhapur, Maharashtra, India
- Education: XLRI- Xavier School of Management; Walchand College of Engineering, Sangli
- Title: CEO, Chanel

Leena Nair (née Menon; born 1969) is a British-Indian business executive who is the chief executive officer (CEO) of Chanel. Nair was previously Unilever's chief human resource officer and a Unilever leadership executive member. Nair was responsible for the human capital of Unilever, which operates across multiple regulatory and labor environments spread over 190 countries. Nair is an advocate for human-centered workplaces and compassionate leadership.

== Early life and education ==
Leena Nair was born in India, into a Kerala-based family in Kolhapur, Maharashtra. She was a part of the first female cohort to graduate from the Holy Cross Convent High School, Kolhapur. She was the first woman in her family to pursue higher education.

After completing a bachelor's degree in electronics and telecommunication (E&TC) engineering at Walchand College of Engineering, Sangli, she graduated with her MBA from XLRI – Xavier School of Management, Jamshedpur, as a gold medalist. The gold medallist recognition awards the top 10 rank holders. She then worked at various factories located in Jamshedpur, Kolkata, Ambattur, and Taloja.

== Career ==
=== Unilever ===
Nair joined Hindustan Unilever (HUL) as a summer intern and became a management trainee in 1992. At this time, she was the first woman to work the night shift on HUL's factory floor. Nair then held multiple managerial roles at the "fast-paced, mass-production" company, such as factory manager for Indian brands, human resources (HR) lead, senior vice president (SVP) of leadership and organization, head of Diversity, Equity, and Inclusion (DEI), and chief human resources officer.

In 2007, Unilever appointed Nair the Executive Director and Vice President of HR, making her the first woman on the Unilever South Asia Leadership Team (SALT). In this role, she focused on two initiatives: performance culture and program launches. Nair "improved productivity levels by 33% in two years" and "implemented the Career by Choice programme, which helped women to re-join the workforce after a career break."

After twenty years at HUL, Nair moved to the global headquarters in London. From 2012 to 2016, she was SVP of Leadership and Organization and Head of DEI. In 2016, Nair became Unilever's "first female, first Asian, youngest ever" chief human resources officer. Simultaneously, from 2016 to 2021, she was a member of Unilever's Executive Committee. During her tenure, Nair desired to "build a global reputation for progressive human-centered leadership, delivering significant business impact." It began with her focus on Unilever's social commitments. First, Nair increased the percentage of female managers within the company from 38% to 50%; second, she assisted the company in committing to pay living wages to all workers across their supply chain by 2030; third, she helped Unilever achieve a 50/50 gender balance across global leadership and management roles.

=== Chanel ===
Despite having no prior fashion experience, Alain Wertheimer recruited her to Chanel. Nair became Chanel's first female and Indian-origin chief executive officer (CEO) in December 2021. She assumed the role in January 2022. Throughout her first few months as CEO, Nair's philosophy was to "seek to understand before you seek to change." Thus, in her first year, she visited 25 regional offices, 40 manufacturing locations, heritage sites, over 100 company retail locations, and every creation studio while familiarizing herself with key fashion leaders, including Chanel's creative director, Virginie Viard.

Under Nair's leadership, Chanel has three new themes: sustainability, exclusivity, and gender equality. In 2022, N°1 de Chanel, a sustainability-focused beauty range, launched to appeal to their "climate-conscious shoppers." The luxury brand is committed to net zero carbon emissions by 2040. Simultaneously, they have introduced private, invite-only boutiques to maintain their status and appeal to "ultra-wealthy shoppers." Lastly, Nair's continued commitment to gender equality in leadership has allowed women to hold 60% of Chanel's management positions.

During Nair's tenure, Foundation Chanel has become the biggest investor in the "UK cultural landscape." Annual funding has increased by $80 million, from $20 to $100 million.

Nair counts Indra Nooyi, the former CEO of PepsiCo, and Nigel Higgins, the chairman of Barclays Bank, among her mentors.

=== Other responsibilities ===
- Non-Executive Board Member – BT plc
- Member of the Trust Board - Leverhulme Trust
- Leadership Council Member – International Centre for Research on Women (2019 – present)
- NED on the UK Government's department of Business, Energy and Industrial strategy (BEIS) (2018- 2020)

=== Recognitions ===
- Ranked 68th on Fortune's list of Most Powerful Women in 2023
- Top 10 list of FT HERoes Champions of Women in Business by the Financial Times (2017–2019)
- Thinkers50 List – Thinkers Who Will Shape the Future of Business (2019)
- 2021 HERoes in Business Women Role Model list
- The Great British Businesswoman's Role Model of the Year Award (2021)
- Forbes India's W-Power list (2022)
- WWD 50 Women in Power list (2023)
- TIME's Women of the Year (2024)
- 2025 CBE (Commanders of the Order of the British Empire)

== Personal life ==
Nair is the daughter of K. Karthikeyan and the cousin of industrialists Vijay Menon and Sachin Menon, who hail from Kerala. Their company, Menon Pistons, is part of the $70 million Menon Group. She is married to Kumar Nair, a financial services entrepreneur, and they have two sons.
