= Saryu Doshi =

Indian art historian

- Born: Mumbai, Maharashtra, India
- Occupations: Art scholar Art historian Curator
- Known for: Miniature art Jain art
- Spouse: Vinod Doshi
- Children: One son
- Awards: Padma Shri; Women Achiever Award; ASI Lifetime Achievement Award

Saryu Vinod Doshi is an Indian art scholar, art historian, academic and curator, known for her erudition in Indian miniature paintings and Jain art. She is the founder director of the National Gallery of Modern Art, Mumbai and a former pro-tem chairman of the Lalit Kala Akademi, New Delhi. She is the author of several books including Masterpieces of Jain Painting, a monograph on selected Jain art pieces. The Government of India awarded her the fourth highest civilian award of the Padma Shri, in 1999.

== Biography ==
Saryu Doshi was born in Mumbai, in the western Indian state of Maharashtra and did her schooling at Queen Mary School, Mumbai. Later, she graduated from the Elphinstone College and secured a diploma in Arts from the Sir Jamsetjee Jeejebhoy School of Art before marrying Vinod Doshi, an industrialist from the Walchand Industrial Group and the son of Lalchand Hirachand, who founded the Hindustan Aeronautics. Though she stayed in Satara after the marriage, she visited Mumbai on a regular basis to keep in touch with the art circle of Mumbai. In 1972, she received the fellowship from the Rockefeller Foundation and pursued research on Indian miniature art and Jain art, for which she received a doctoral degree (PhD). She served as a visiting professor of Art History and Culture at University of Michigan from January to April 1976 and returned to India and worked at the University of Pune for the first six months of 1978. She also had a stint at University of California, Berkeley in 1979, from March to June, as a visiting faculty. Her researches have also helped in the discovery of many Jain manuscripts from the fifteenth century.

In 1996, Doshi was among the art enthusiasts who founded the National Gallery of Modern Art, Mumbai and served as the founder director of the institution. She took over the pro-tem chairmanship of the Lalit Kala Akademi in 1996 and held the post till 2002. She has curated several art exhibitions in India and is a former editor of non-profit publishing house of Marg, which published several of her books. Besides Masterpieces of Jain Painting, she has also published three other monographs, namely, Dances of Manipur: The Classical Tradition, on Manipuri dance, Dharna Vihara, Ranakpur, about the ancient Jain temples of Rajasthan and Homage to Shravana Belgola, about the ancient Jain pilgrim centre. Goa Cultural Patterns, Shivaji and Facets of Maratha Culture, A Collector's Dream : Indian Art in the Collections of Basant Kumar and Saraladevi Birla and the Birla Academy of Art and Culture, The Indian Woman, Homage to Karnataka, Symbols and Manifestations of Indian Art, Continuity and Change: Festival of India in Great Britain, An age of splendour: Islamic art in India, India and Greece, connections and parallels, India and Egypt: Influences and Interactions, Tribal India: Ancestors, Gods, and Spirits, India: Week by Week (Kerala), Images and Tradition - Festival of India in Great Britain (Volume XXXVI) and Pageant of Indian Art: Festival of India in Great Britain are her other publications. She is a member of the advisory council of the India chapter of the Asia Society and has travelled extensively to deliver keynote addresses at several seminars in Europe, US, Africa and Asia. She has also given talks on BBC and All India Radio.

The Government of India awarded her the civilian honour of the Padma Shri in 1999. She received the Woman Achiever Award from the Bombay West Ladies' Circle in 2001 and the Art Society of India honoured her with Lifetime Achievement Award in 2006. Vinod Doshi, her husband, died on 6 October 2008, leaving their son, Maitreya, with her. She lives along Carmichael Road (later renamed as M. L. Dahanukar Marg), in South Mumbai.

As trustee of the Vinod and Saryu Doshi Foundation, Doshi oversees the annual Vinod Doshi Theatre Festival, which showcases experimental theater productions from young and independent theater artists in the city of Pune, Maharashtra, India.

== Bibliography ==
- Saryu Doshi, ed. (1981). Homage to Shravana Belgola. Marg Publications. p. 176. ISBN 978-0391025189.
- Saryu Doshi (1982). Homage to Karnataka. Marg Publications. ASIN B001JATAQ0.
- Saryu Doshi (1982). Shivaji and Facets of Maratha Culture. Marg Publications. ASIN B0022TPFMK.
- Saryu Doshi (1983). Goa Cultural Patterns. Marg Publications. p. 152. ASIN B000BTNLNI.
- Saryu Doshi (1983). Continuity and Change: Festival of India in Great Britain. Marg Publications. p. 113. ASIN B0000CQD33.
- Saryu Doshi; Karl Khandalavala, eds. (1983). An age of splendour: Islamic art in India. Marg Publications. p. 149. ASIN B0000CQD3O.
- Saryu Doshi, ed. (1984). Images and Tradition - Festival of India in Great Britain. Marg Publications. p. 100. ASIN B000KKLFCM.
- Saryu Doshi, ed. (1984). Pageant of Indian Art: Festival of India in Great Britain. Smithsonian Institution Press. ISBN 978-9994253449.
- Saryu Doshi (1984). Symbols and Manifestations of Indian Art. Marg Publications. ASIN B0017PR4XI.
- Saryu Doshi (1985). India and Greece, connections and parallels. Marg Publications. ASIN B001RBZI2Q.
- Khandlavala, Karl; Doshi, Saryu, eds. (1987). A Collector's Dream : Indian Art in the Collections of Basant Kumar and Saraladevi Birla and the Birla Academy of Art and Culture. Marg Publications. ASIN B0022TIJIM.
- Saryu Doshi (1987). The Indian Woman. The Department of Women and Child Development. ASIN B0007C6MNK.
- Saryu Doshi; Maureen Liebl (1988). India: Week by Week (Kerala). Media Transasia. ASIN B00123QN6Y.
- Saryu Doshi (1989). Dances of Manipur: The Classical Tradition. Gaudiya Vedanta Publications. p. 128. ISBN 978-8185026091.
- Saryu Doshi, ed. (1992). Tribal India: Ancestors, Gods, and Spirits. South Asia Books. p. 136. ISBN 978-8185026183.
- Saryu Doshi (1993). India and Egypt: Influences and Interactions. South Asia Books. p. 35. ISBN 978-8185026237.
- Saryu Doshi (1996). Dharna Vihara, Ranakpur. Axel Menges. p. 63. ISBN 978-3930698172.
