= Narottam Morarjee =

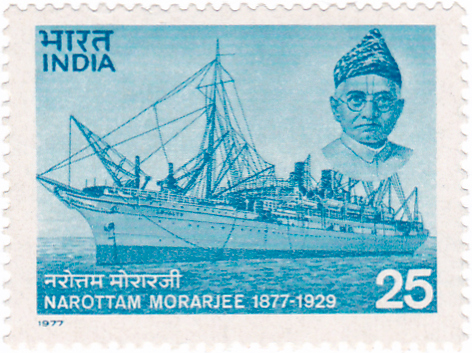
Morarjee on a 1977 stamp of India

Narottam Morarjee (2 April 1877 – 5 November 1929) was an Indian businessperson with major interests in shipping and textiles.

Narottam Morarjee was born on 2 April 1877 at Porbandar. His father Seth Morarjee Goculdas was a pioneering textile magnate. He studied at Elphinstone College. He started managing two mills- Morarjee Goculdas Mill of Bombay and Solapur Mill of Solapur while studying.

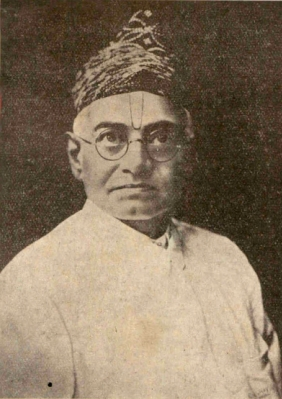

Narottam Morarjee later came into close contact with Mahatma Gandhi, Annie Besant, Dadabhai Naoroji, Rabindranath Tagore, Sarojini Naidu and Motilal Nehru.

Narottam Morarjee joined hands with other Gujarati businessmen, Walchand Hirachand and Kilachand Devchand to finance and establish The Scindia Steam Navigation Company Ltd., which was founded on 27 March 1919. On 5 April 1919, Scindia's first ship s.s. LOYALTY sailed from Bombay to the United Kingdom and unfurled the flag of Indian shipping in international waters.

Narottam Morarjee died on 5 November 1929. Walchand Hirachand, ran some of his ventures till a year before he died in 1953. Narottam Morarjee's son Shantikumar filled in the posts of his father. But the group was indebted with liabilities and ultimately, Morarjee Goculdas Mill was taken over by Piramal Chaturbhuj, patriarch of the Piramal family. While, after death of Walchand in 1953, the Scindia Shipping was completely taken over by Narottam Morajee group but shipping business, could not survive the changes and stopped doing business in 1980s. Scindia Shipyard, a subsidiary of Scindia Steamship, in which Narottam Morajee, Walchand & Kilachands had stakes was nationalized by the government in 1961.

The Government of India and the Indian Shipping Industry at Mumbai established diploma courses in shipping management, which have been named the Narottam Morarjee Institute of Shipping.
