= Walchand College of Engineering, Sangli =

College in Sangli, Maharashtra, India

Coordinates: 16°50′35″N 74°36′1″E

Walchand College of Engineering
- Motto: क्रियासिद्धिः सत्वे
- Motto in English: Success depends on quality
- Type: Autonomous institute
- Established: 1947; 79 years ago
- Chairman: Ajit Gulabchand
- Director: Dr. Surendra Singh Rathod
- Location: Sangli, Maharashtra, India
- Campus: 90 acres (36 ha)
- Website: www.walchandsangli.ac.in

Walchand College of Engineering is a college in the city of Sangli, Maharashtra, India. The WCE campus is situated on nearly 90 acres of land in Vishrambag, roughly midway between the twin cities of Sangli and Miraj.

The college was established in 1947 by the Dhondumama Sathe and began with an undergraduate course in Civil Engineering with a capacity of 60 students. It was affiliated with Bombay University in 1947. After Pune University was set up in 1948, the college became affiliated with Pune University. In 1955, the college was renamed after Walchand Hirachand, an industrialist. Since the establishment of Shivaji University, at Kolhapur in 1962, Walchand College of Engineering, Sangli has been affiliated with Shivaji University. Since 2007, it has been an autonomous college offering the B.Tech. degree in Maharashtra with 'financial and academic autonomy'. It is known for its vast campus and placement.

== History ==
Walchand College of Engineering offered its first academic program, an undergraduate degree in civil engineering (B.E.(Civil)) for up to 60 students in 1947. In 1955, an undergraduate degree in electrical engineering (B.E.(Elec)) was established, and a Bachelor of Mechanical Engineering degree (B.E.(Mech)) was offered in 1956. Both programs had a 60-student capacity. Postgraduate coursework in all three engineering disciplines was first offered in 1971. Graduate and undergraduate degrees in computer science and electronics engineering were added in the 1980s and 1990s.

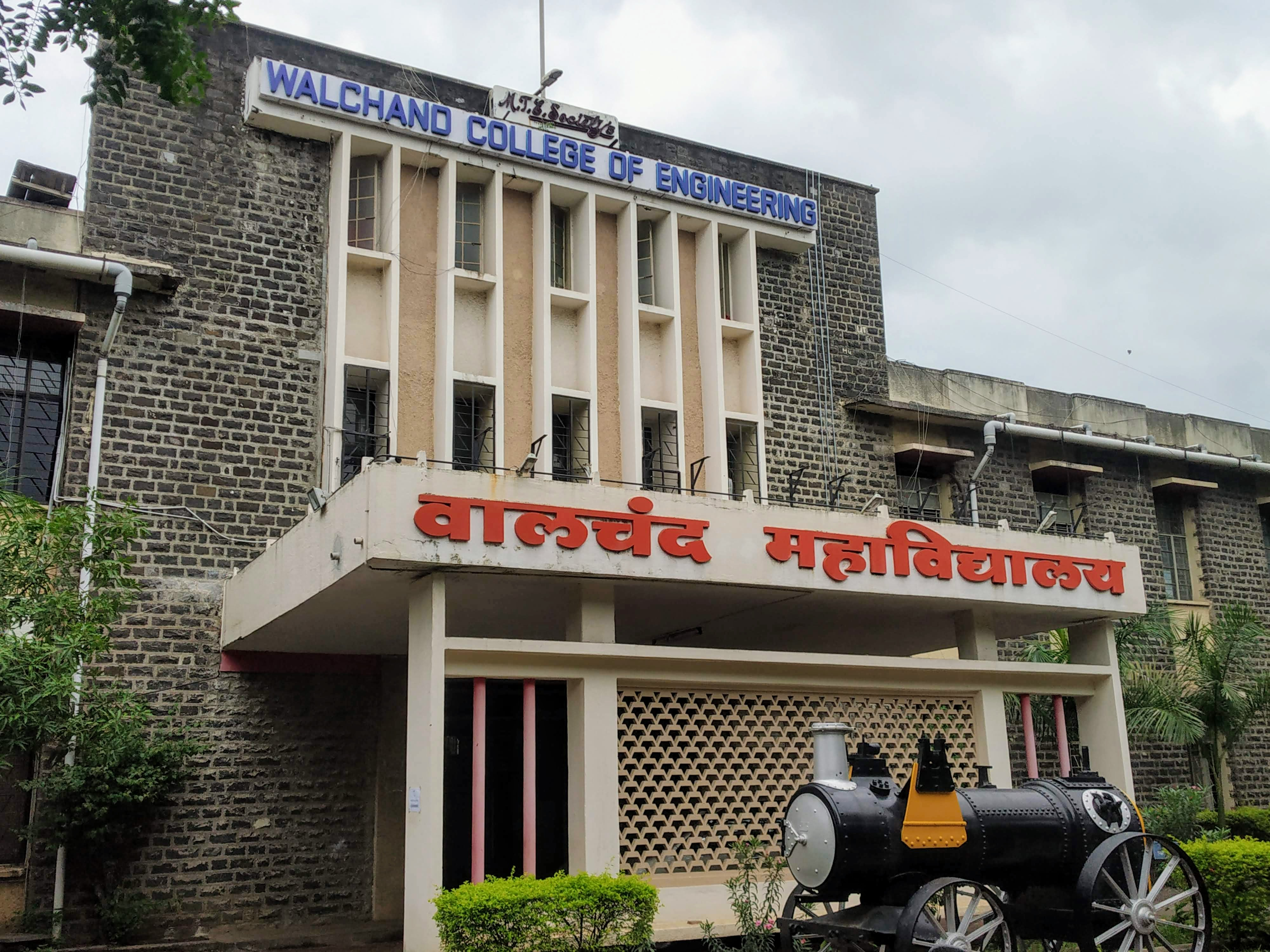
Administration Building

Postgraduate courses in civil, mechanical and electrical engineering and a diploma course in industrial electronics were introduced in 1971. In 1986, undergraduate and postgraduate courses in electronics engineering and an undergraduate course in computer science and engineering were introduced, and a postgraduate course in computer science and engineering was introduced in 1997.

In 2001, the college added a Bachelor of Engineering course in information technology with a capacity of 60 students, and capacity for an additional 30 students was added to the computer science and engineering course. Departments of physics, chemistry, mathematics and geology have been established.

The placement record of the college shows 464 undergraduate students placed in organisations during 2010 and 2011.

The college was selected under the World Bank funded Government of India scheme "Technical Education Quality Improvement Program"(TEQIP) in 2005. It received nearly Rs. 9 crores of funding under TEQIP which ended in March 2009. As reported in the survey conducted by Spectrum India, Walchand College ranked No. 2 all-India out of about 127 institutes that participated in TEQIP. In 2011, the college was selected under Phase II of TEQIP, focused on development of PG education. In 2017, Once again college was selected under Phase III of TEQIP under TWINNING Arrangement with Jabalpur Engineering College.

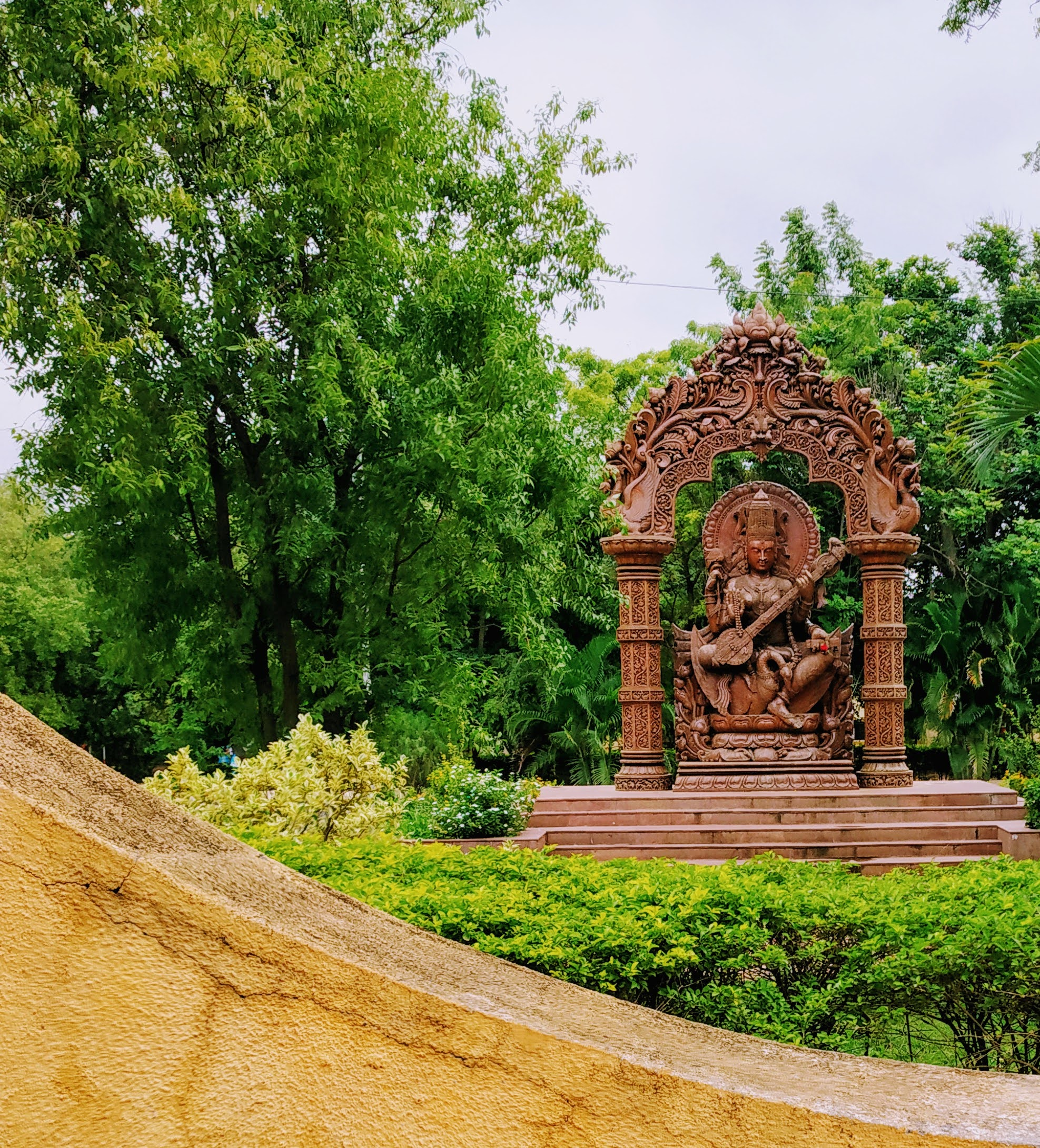
Sarasvati Idol in front of Library

== Campus ==
The college campus spreads over an area of about 90 acres (36 ha). The college has different buildings for different departments. The central quadrangle (as it is called) has classrooms large enough to seat 60-70 students, and a few classrooms with a capacity of around 100 students. At the center of the quadrangle is an assembly hall called Tilak Hall and an open-air theatre. The newly constructed library building also has a reading room. The library is named after Ajit Gulabchand as Ajit Gulbchand Central Library. It is one of the biggest libraries in Asia. The remainder of the campus is mostly covered with dense trees. The campus is famous as a mini peacock sanctuary as you will find them everywhere in college.

== Hostel ==
The college has had a hostel facility for males since 1958 and for females since 1987. There are eight hostel blocks (D1 to D8) with high speed internet connectivity through WiFi, and a capacity of 738 students. In response to the recent trend of increasing female enrollment, two hostel blocks were suitably modified and converted into women's hostels. At the initiative of the Chairman, Shri Ajit Gulabchand, another hostel block with a capacity of 46 students was converted into a cyber hostel with internet connectivity. Over 300 female students are presently inhabiting hostel accommodations. There is a plan to construct a new hostel for women, as per the new Campus Master Plan developed by the firm HOK (USA).

== Lab Facilities ==
Various lab facilities are provided by IT department to students.

1. Unix Lab
2. Microprocessor Lab
3. High Performance Computing Lab(For M-tech)
4. Nvidia Lab
5. John Deere research center in Embedded system

The IT department in WCE has various Moodle addresses. Students have direct access to these models. They can check their attendance, and can upload their assignments.

Teachers can upload assignments for the students. Quizzes on some subjects are held on the moodle.

=== Mechanical department ===
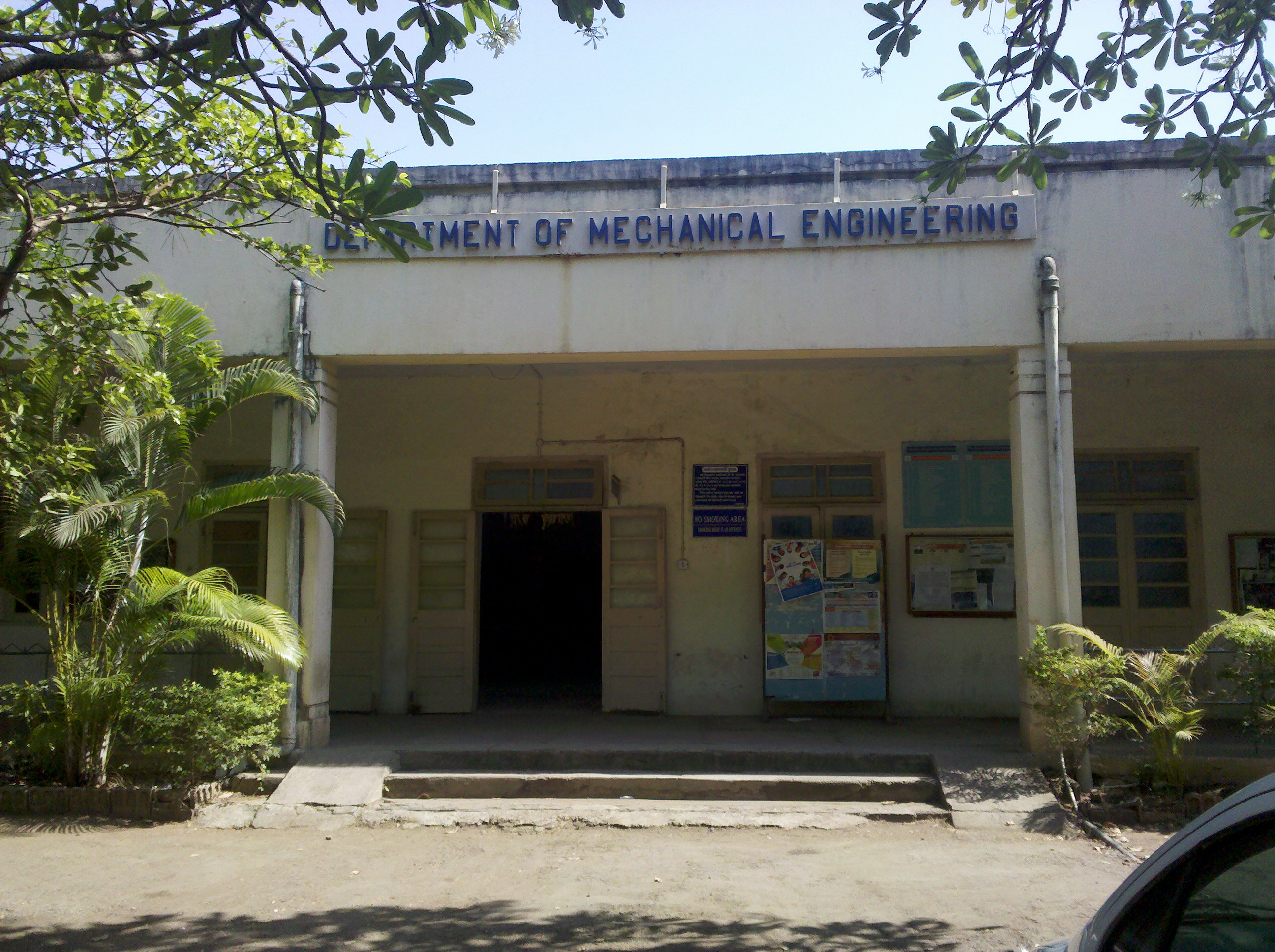
Department of Mechanical Engineering

The Mechanical department of the college has various facilities available for students. Workshops include lathe machines, woodturning machines, milling machines, shapers and a CNC machine. The department also hosts a few large boilers; some dating as far back as the 1930s. Though no longer in working condition, students can climb in the Babcock & Wilcox boiler for study purposes. Separate workshops for blacksmithing and carpentry allow students to gain practical experience. The smithy workshop also has a furnace in working condition.

For aerodynamic study purposes, a wind tunnel is available in the laboratory. The main entrance grounds also have a demonstrator wind mill.

Together with the Electronics department, a separate mechatronics laboratory is under development along with a cryogenics laboratory. A new demonstrator steam turbine power plant has recently been set up.

== SAE Activities ==
The college has been very prominent and active in participating in SAE India events, held every year. Team Aaryans is the official racing team of WCE which has been participating in E and M baja, Efficycle and Go-Kart - all events conducted by SAE India.

Efficycle

The team traces it success back to 2012 when it secured an All India Rank 3 and in subsequent events held in 2013 and 2015.

BAJA

Team Aaryans has been participating in BAJA for couple of years now. In the 2019 edition of E-BAJA, the team bagged prizes worth 90,000 rupees. Along with this the E-BAJA team won the best marketing presentation award in 2017. The M-BAJA team of Aaryans secured All India Rank 20 in the 2019 edition of M-BAJA. The team has also bagged 'Best CAE Award','Best Sales Presentation Award' and 'Best Design Award' over these consecutive years of participation.

== Academics ==
=== Degrees offered ===
Undergraduate degrees: Bachelor of technology (B. Tech)

- Civil Engineering
- Computer Science and Engineering
- Electrical Engineering
- Electronics Engineering
- Information Technology
- Mechanical Engineering
- Artificial Intelligence and Machine Learning (New)
- Cybersecurity (New)

Postgraduate Degrees: Master of Technology (M.Tech)

- Computer Science and Engineering
- Computer Science and Engineering [ Information Technology ]
- Electrical Engineering- Control Systems
- Electrical Engineering- Power Systems
- Electronics Engineering
- Environmental Engineering
- Heat Power Engineering
- Mechanical Design Engineering
- Mechanical Production Engineering
- Structural Engineering

== Students Driven Clubs ==
Many clubs are being driven and managed by students for academic and personal improvement.

== Rankings ==
It's ranked more than 163 in NIRF 2020 Rankings with NIRF score of 32.39

== Gallery ==
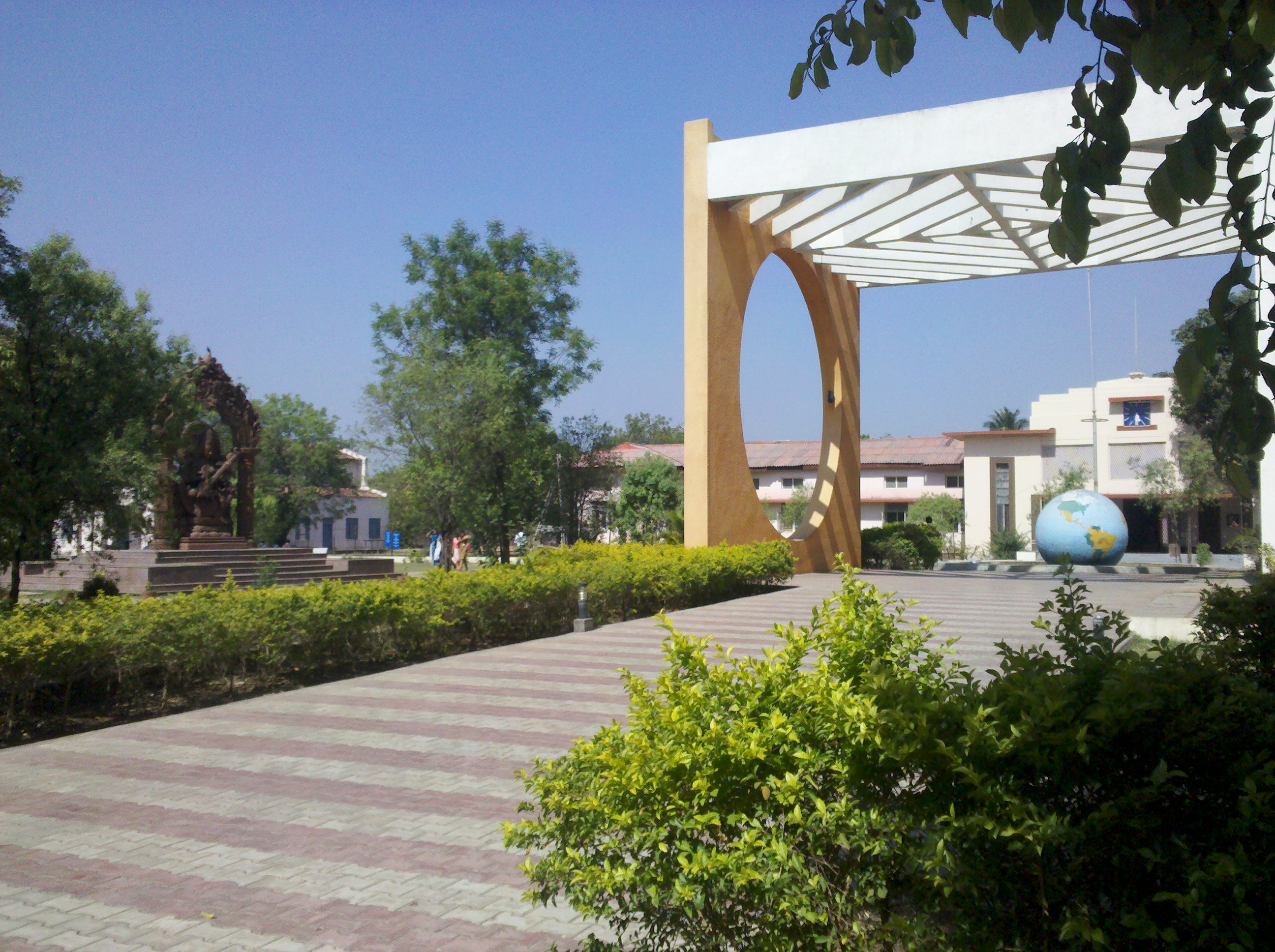
Walchand College campus

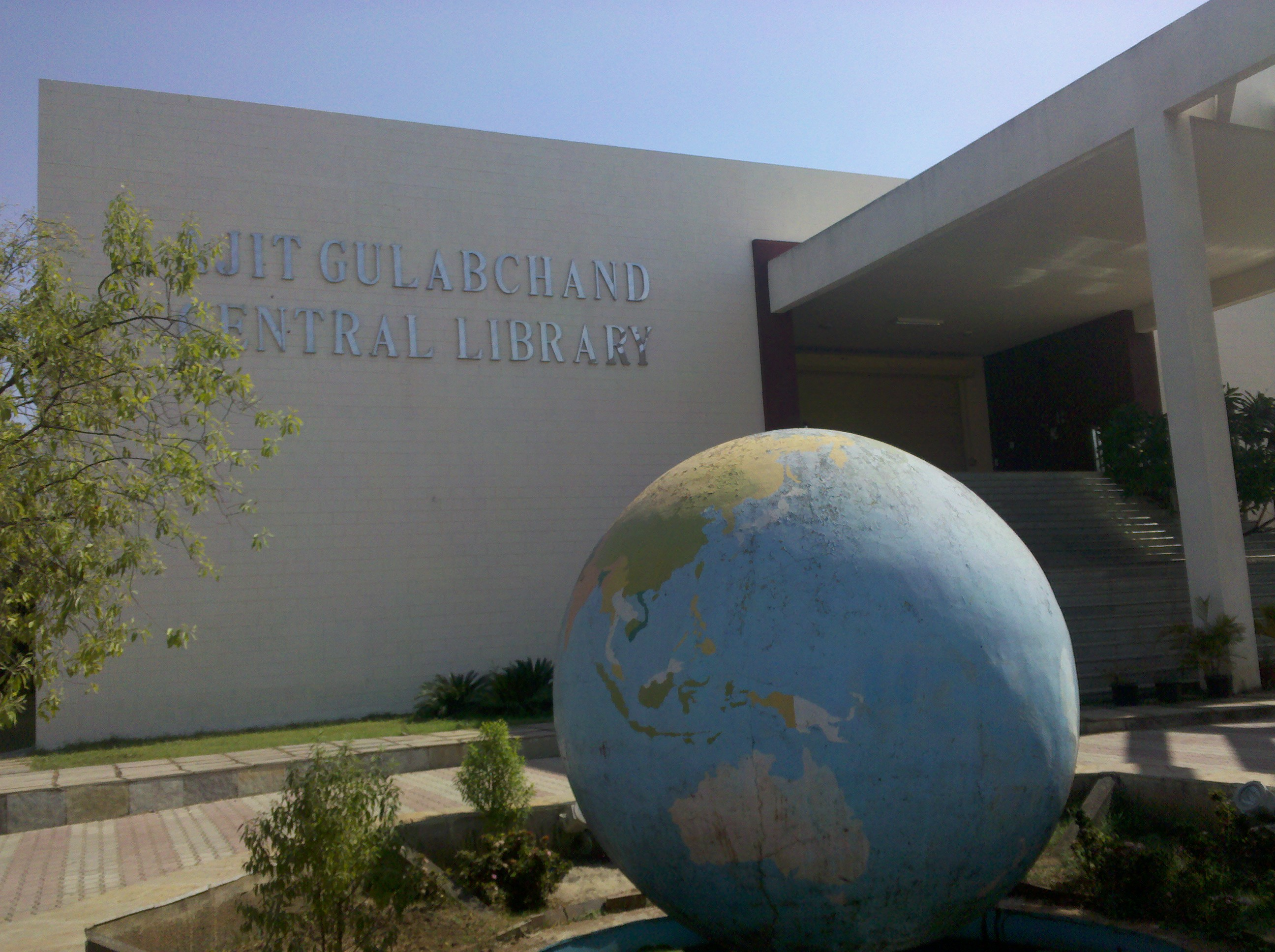
Ajit Gulabchand Central Library

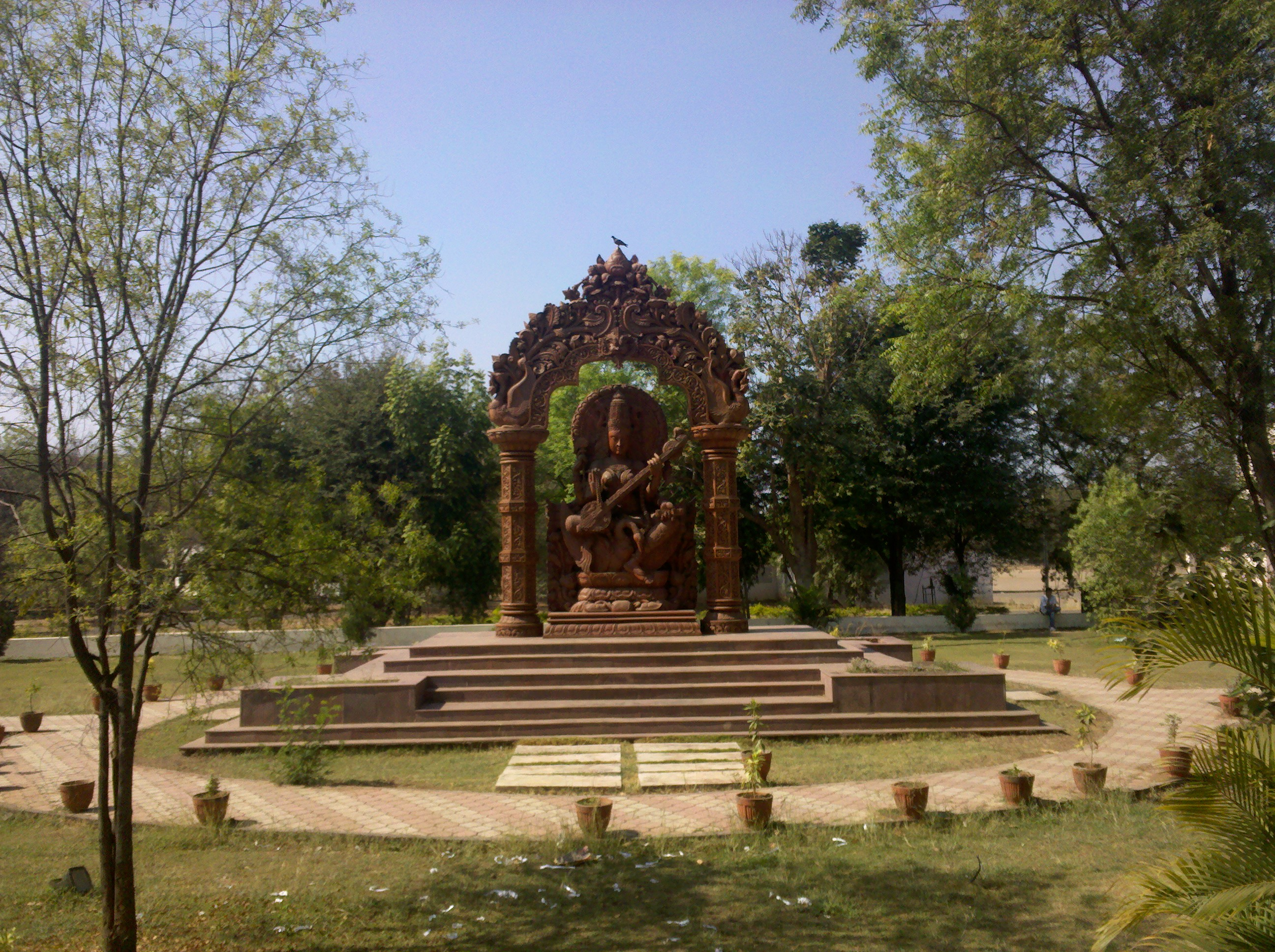
Saraswati Statue

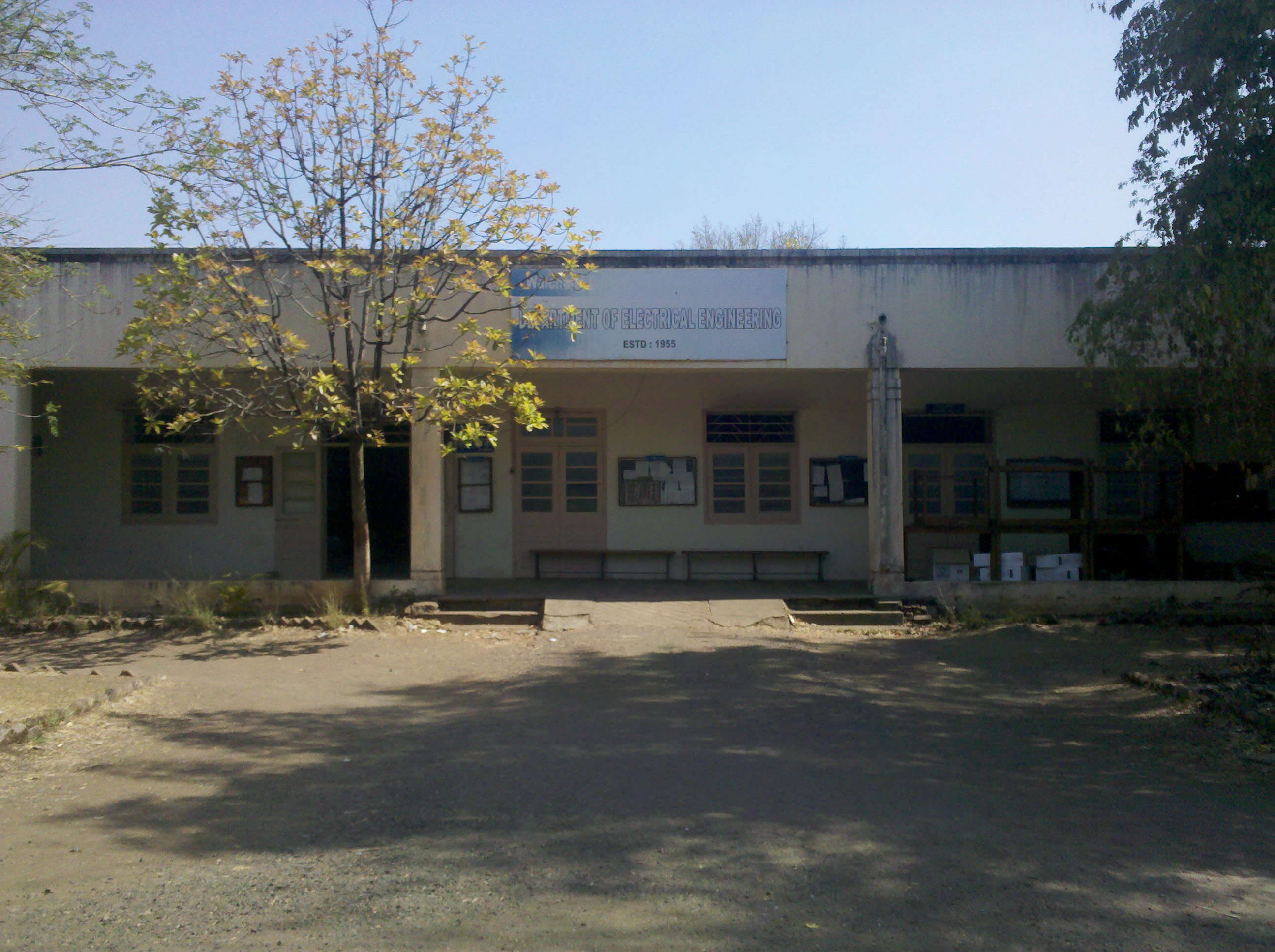
Department of Electrical Engineering

== Alumni associations ==
Many alumni associations for the college have been formed in India and abroad. The Association of Past Students is a registered organization and the registered members date back to 1956. More recently, Walchand College of Engineering Alumni Silicon Valley Chapter (CA, USA), and Tri-State Chapter (NY, USA) were formed in 2015.

=== Notable alumni ===
- Leena Nair CEO Chanel — former global senior vice-president for leadership and organization development at Unilever. She was the student of electronics engineering.
- Shri. Mahadevrao Jankar, National President Rashtriya Samaj Paksha (RSP). Jankar was student of Electrical Engineering and was gold medalist in his field
