= Walchand Hirachand =

Indian industrialist (1882–1953)

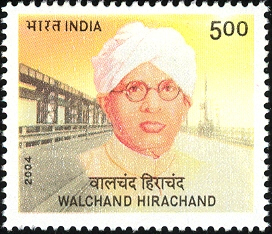
- Hirachand on a 2004 stamp of India
- Born: 23 November 1882; Solapur, Bombay Presidency, British India
- Died: 8 April 1953 (aged 70); Siddhpur, Bombay State, India
- Occupations: Chairman, Walchand group
- Relatives: Walchand family

Walchand Hirachand Doshi CIE (23 November 1882 – 8 April 1953) was an Indian industrialist and the founder of the Walchand group. He established India's first modern shipyard, first aircraft factory and first car factory; he also established construction companies, sugarcane plantations, sugar factories, confectioneries, engineering companies and many other businesses.

== Early life ==
Walchand Hirachand was born in Solapur, (now in Maharashtra) to Seth Hirachand Nemchand Doshi and his first wife Raju. Walchand born into a Digambar Jain family from Wankaner Gujarat, who had settled in Solapur in the erstwhile Bombay Presidency.

Hirachand was engaged in cotton trading and money lending. Walchand's mother died a few days after his birth. Hirachand then married Sakhubai to whom his half-brothers Gulabchand, Ratanchand and Lalchand were born. his brothers served as president of All India Digamber Jain Tirthakshetra Committee, and also his family has made significant contribution to the Jain community.

== Education ==
Walchand matriculated in 1899 from Solapur Government High School and later attended St. Xaviers College, Mumbai, and earned a BA degree from the University of Mumbai. Later he attended Deccan College in Pune but discontinued his studies to join his family business.

== Marriage ==
While he was still studying, in 1900, he married Jiu Kilachand, daughter of a Solapur banker. From this marriage, he had a daughter named Chatur, but his wife died in childbirth. Later, in 1913, under family pressure, he married Kastur Mehta. From his second marriage, he had a boy and girl child but both died in infancy.

== Early business ==
After spending a few years in his father's family business of banking and cotton trades, he realised he was not interested in the family business. He became a railway contractor for constructions in partnership with a former railway clerk, Laxmanrao Balwant Phatak; the partnership later became Phatak-Walchand private limited. Walchand proved to be a successful railway contractor but was open to other business ideas as well.

== Career ==
Walchand was noted for his ambition and vision. Among his adversaries, the more charitable termed him a dreamer while the less charitable dismissed him as a person who wanted to run even before learning to walk. Despite not hailing from an established business house, the projects undertaken by Walchand were grand in design, to say the least. While attention to detail in planning was not one of his strengths, he always seemed to know how to find his way around. This was true especially with respect to manpower management, meeting deadlines and raising funds. Most of his projects were highly leveraged. While he seemed to oppose nationalisation and government control of some of the projects he started such as the shipyard and the aircraft factory, the fact remains that these businesses may have had to face liquidation but for government investing the money. Also, it needs to be noted that the government also had a strong interest in the operation of these industries as it directly helped in its war efforts. Despite exercising management control in firms such as Scindia Steam Navigation Company Ltd., Hindustan Aircraft and Hindustan Shipyard, he was not the largest shareholder in any of these companies. He understood the power of mass media and cultivated it to gather public support for his projects; while this may appear to be easy in the politically charged days of the British Raj, it also has to be kept in mind that running newspapers perceived to be in opposition with the government was fraught with dangers. Thus, it becomes clear that his persuasive abilities were helpful in generating good press and public goodwill towards his projects. As a contractor engaged in construction, his biggest customer was the British government; he worked with British officials closely in several projects. However, he supported the Indian independence movement and most of his projects were inaugurated (including launching of new ships) by famous freedom fighters. He was able to maintain a fine line between these opposite forces.

Walchand along with Annie Besant and M. R. Jayakar together were the first sponsors of the pioneering national news agency, the Free Press of India founded in 1927. Walchand was among the early and active supporters of Indian National Congress along with other stalwarts of Indian industry and funded many of its activities. In 1930, various merchant bodies of Bombay under the presidency of Walchand passed a resolution for the immediate release of Mahatma Gandhi; but again, in 1931, it was Walchand, who on behalf of the Indian Merchants' Chamber demanded from Gandhi that they were not happy with the Gandhi–Irwin Pact and demanded the protection of Indian industries. Again, in 1933, Walchand sent a deputation on behalf of the Indian Merchants' Chamber to Gandhi to persuade him to call off the Civil Disobedience Movement in the interest of trade and commerce. He was also a signatory to the Bombay Manifesto dated 26 May 1936, which opposed the socialist and Marxist ideas of Jawaharlal Nehru.

=== Construction business ===
It was in the construction business, first as a railway contractor and then as a contractor to other departments of Government, that Phatak-Walchand private limited (partnership till 1915) made money. Phatak left the firm after it bought a foundry and undertook a mining lease, with the view that it was stretching itself into too many areas. Meanwhile, the firm found it difficult to bag larger contracts due to its small size and the absence of marquee names. It was merged into Tata Construction Company in 1920 to overcome these problems. Some of the major projects executed by the company include the commissioning of the tunnels through the Bhor Ghats for a railway route from Mumbai to Pune and laying of water pipes from Tansa Lake to Mumbai and also the laying of tracks for the Barsi Light Railway. Other major projects executed by the firm include the Kalabag Bridge over Indus and a bridge across the Irrawaddy River in Burma. All these projects were directed by Walchand. In 1929, he became the managing director of the company. In 1935, the company was renamed Premier Construction to reflect the fact that the Tatas had sold their stake in the firm to Walchand. Another construction company he founded was Hindustan Construction Company in 1926, which is today one of the civil and engineering construction giants of India.

=== Sugar machinery and confectionery ===
Walchand founded Walchandnagar Industries in 1908, which was started as a large-scale sugar farming firm but was later diversified into also making sugar refined spirits, sugar machinery, plastic goods, cement plant, paper and pulp plant, and water tubes. Walchand made Gulabchand its chairman to look after its day-to-day affairs. Walchandnagar Industries is today a diversified company manufacturing also boilers, turbines and also supplies strategic components to India's defence and aerospace sector. WIL was subject to sanctions by the United States following Pokhran-II for its involvement in India's nuclear and space programs. The sanctions were dropped in 2001.

Another company in sugar and confectionery, the Ravalgaon Sugar Farm, was started by Walchand in 1933 and its Confectionery Division was started in 1942. Today, Ravalgaon Sugar is one of the market leaders in the Indian confectionery market.

=== Shipping ===
In 1919, after the end of World War I, he along with his friends, Narottam Morarjee, and Kilachand Devchand, bought a steamer, the SS Loyalty from the Scindias of Gwalior; with Narottam Morarjee being major financer. Walchand's underlying assumption was that the post-war years would also spell massive growth for the shipping industry just as the war years had done. However, British companies such as P&O and BI Shipping were strong in the shipping industry and most of the attempts by domestic players till then had failed. Walchand named his company The Scindia Steam Navigation Company Ltd. and competed with the foreign players. It was recognised as the first Swadeshi shipping company in the true sense of the term and was referred to widely in Mahatma Gandhi's columns in Young India and Harijan on Swadeshi, boycott of foreign goods and Non co-operation movement. It barely managed to survive after entering into agreements on routes and fare wars with its foreign competitors. However, Walchand still supported new indigenous shipping ventures, as he believed that a strong domestic shipping industry was the need of the hour. In 1929, he became the Chairman of Scindia Steam and continued in the same position till 1950 when he resigned on grounds of ill health. By 1953, the company had captured 21% of Indian coastal traffic. Sir Lallubhai Samaldas was amongst the later directors of Scindia Steamship.

=== Aircraft factory ===
In 1939, a chance acquaintance with an American aircraft company manager inspired him to start an aircraft factory in India. Hindustan Aircraft was started in Bangalore in the Mysore State with the active support of its Diwan, Mirza Ismail, in December 1940, where Kingdom of Mysore were partners in venture. Others, who invested their money were Dharamsey Mulraj Khatau and Tulsidas Kilachand. By April 1941, the then British Indian government acquired one-third of ownership and by April 1942, it nationalised the company by compensating shareholders adequately. The reasons that prompted the government for nationalising were – it was a sensitive and strategic sector; Japan's advances in the war meant that the government needed fast responses and hence, direct ownership; and it could not allow a crucial war project to remain undercapitalised or loss-making. Hindustan Aircraft was renamed as Hindustan Aeronautics Limited.

=== Shipyard ===
Walchand also believed that there was a strong need for a shipyard in the country and started work on it in 1940 at Visakhapatnam. In the days when it was unthinkable of foundation ceremony to be done by anyone other than British officials, the truly patriotic Walchand decided to break the tradition and the foundation stone for the shipyard was laid by Dr. Rajendra Prasad on 21 June 1941, who was acting Congress President at that time. It was named Scindia Shipyard Limited and its first product, the ship Jalusha was launched soon after independence by Jawaharlal Nehru in 1948. However, the shipyard came under government control a few months later (due to the presumed importance of the project to country's security and economic growth) and was fully nationalised in 1961 and was renamed Hindustan Shipyard Limited.

=== Car factory ===
As early as 1939, Walchand was interested in establishing a car factory in India. Birla family was also working in the same direction. In 1940, he signed an MOU with Chrysler but could not get clearances and concessions from the Mysore government unlike in the case of the aircraft company. In 1945, he established Premier Automobiles Limited (PAL) near Mumbai. Again in this venture his other partners were Dharamsey Mulraj Khatau and Tulsidas Kilachand, who were also Walchand's partners in Hindustan Aircraft. By 1948, the company started indigenisation in a small way with an in-house components department. The first car rolled out of his factory in 1949, thus beating Birla's Hindustan Motors venture in the race. In 1955, it tied up with Fiat and started manufacturing engines in India. By 1956, parts of chassis were locally made.

=== Pipelines ===
In the year 1926, he formed The Indian Hume Pipe Company with licence from Humes of Australia for the manufacture of Reinforced Cement Concrete Pipes. Today the company manufactures various types of concrete pipes and undertakes construction of water supply infrastructure for towns and villages in India.

=== Insurance ===
To face competition in the shipping business from the British and other foreign businesses, Walchand entered allied businesses such as insurance. In 1937, he presided over the conference of Indian insurance companies held in Calcutta.

== Public life ==
Walchand was one of the founding members of the Maharashtra Chamber of Commerce, Industry & Agriculture, and served as its president for eleven consecutive years from 1927 to 1938. Walchand was also the founder of the Indian National Shipowners' Association, which was founded in 1929, and served as its president for 19 consecutive years from 1929 to 1948. He also helped launch the Indian Sugar Mills Association and the Indian Sugar Syndicate. He served as President of Indian Merchants' Chamber for years 1927–28. Also, Walchand founded the Deccan Sugar Factories Association and the Deccan Sugar Technologists Association, and made his younger brother, Lalchand, its first President, and he was also the force behind institutions like the Association of Indian Automobile Manufacturers and the Automotive Research Association of India.

== Death ==
In 1949, he suffered a stroke, and he retired from business in 1950. He was looked after by his wife, Kasturbai, in his last years, who took him away to natural surroundings and the religious town of Siddhpur in Gujarat, away from Mumbai, so that he could recover his health. He died on 8 April 1953 at Siddhpur.

He was survived by his wife Kastur and daughter Chatur, who was from his first marriage.

== Legacy ==
His legacy remains important. By 1947, when India became independent, the Walchand group of companies was one of the ten largest business houses in the country. The first Indian ship SS Loyalty made its maiden international voyage on 5 April 1919 by sailing from Mumbai to London. Walchand Hirachand was personally present on the ship. After India became independent, 5 April has been declared the National Maritime Day to honour that voyage. While Walchand pioneered a role for India in several industries, his dependence on excessive leverage and nationalisation seem to have taken the sheen off his contributions. The car factory, while the first in India, trailed the Birlas' Hindustan Motors in terms of market share. Walchandnagar Industries Limited, located at Walchandnagar, an industrial township near Pune is today a strategic defence and nuclear equipments manufacturing company. Absence of direct male heirs may also have had a role in the nature of the businesses left behind by him. For Walchand, industry was probably not just a place to make money but also to have adventure. For example, a visit to Hollywood inspired him to construct a huge studio now known as Walchand Studio in India for which he was earlier in talks with the famous Bollywood producer-director V. Shantaram without a tangible result. However, for years to come, he would probably be remembered as the man who dared to dream and was able to materialise most of his dreams into reality by his steadfastness and willpower.

As Walchand Hirachand died without any heirs, his business is now run by descendants of his brothers like Gulabchand Hirachand, Lalchand Hirachand, Ratanchand Hirachand, who worked together till they were no longer alive.

== Philanthropy ==
During his lifetime, he started several charitable trusts, to look after several and also establish new educational institutions, boarding house and carry on other philanthropic works and sponsorships, including:

- Walchand Institute of Technology, at Solapur, India
- Walchand College of Engineering, Sangli, founded in 1947
- Walchand Dale Carnegie Finishing School at Bellandur, India
- Walchand College of Arts and Science, Solapur, established in 1962
- Smt. Kasturbai Walchand College, Sangli, named after his wife
- Seth Hirachand Nemchand Digambar Jain Boarding, Pune, a boarding house founded in 1941 for Jains and named after the father of Walchand Hirachand and his brothers
- Walchand Public School, Sonipat

== Honours and monuments ==
- A road in Mumbai is named after him as Walchand Hirachand Marg.
- A road in Solapur, his hometown is also named after him as Seth Walchand Hirachand Marg.
- Government of India issued a postage stamp honouring him on 23 November 2004.
- A hall is named after him as Walchand Hirachand Hall at Indian Merchants' Chamber house at Mumbai in his memory and honour.
- Walchandnagar, an industrial township near Pune is named after him.
- Stone Statue of Sri Walchand Hirachand on Group Captain Suranjan Das Road, Bengaluru.
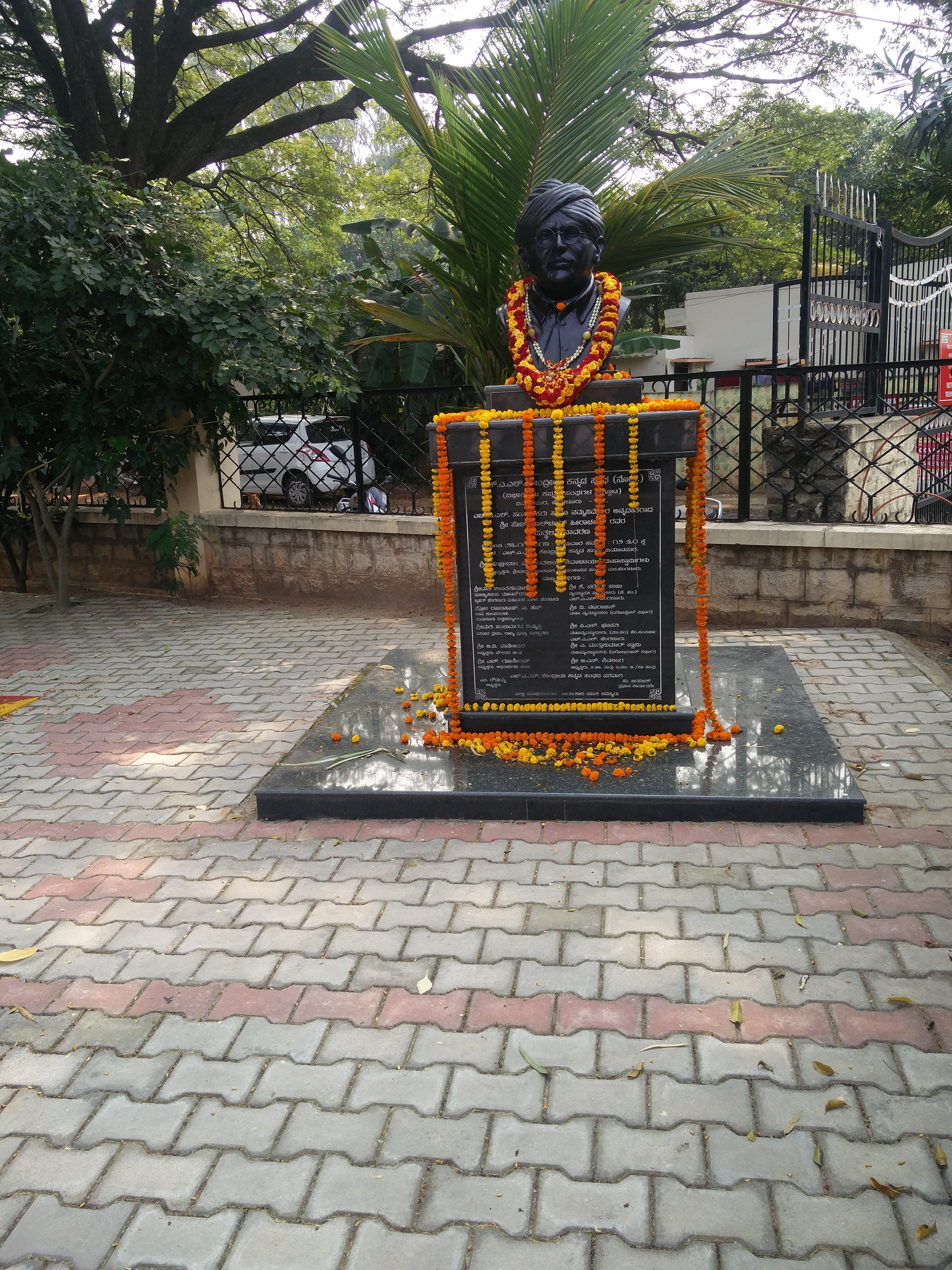
  Statue of Sri ValChand HeeraChand, Founder of Hindustan Aeronautics Limited, Bengaluru at HAL Old Airport Bus Stop, Suranjan Das Road, Bengaluru

A stone statue has been erected in junction near Eastern naval command and Hindustan shipyard limited in Visakhapatnam to commemorate his contribution towards Indian marine initiatives.

== Cited sources ==
- Khānolakara, Gaṅgādhara Devarāva (1969). Walchand Hirachand: Man, His Times, and Achievements. Walchand.
- Piramal, Gita (1999). Business Legends. Penguin Books India. p. 165. ISBN 978-0-14-027187-4.
