= Premier Automobiles Limited =

Indian automotive manufacturer company

Premier Limited
- Formerly: Premier Automobiles Ltd.
- Type: Public
- Traded as: BSE: 500540; NSE: PREMIER
- ISIN: INE342A01018
- Industry: Automotive
- Founded: 1944
- Founder: Walchand Hirachand
- Defunct: 2019
- Fate: Bankruptcy
- Headquarters: 58, Nariman Bhavan, Mumbai, Maharashtra, India
- Area served: India
- Key people: Maitreya V. Doshi (Chairman)
- Products: Automobiles
- Parent: Walchand Group
- Website: www.premier.co.in

Premier Ltd (formerly known as The Premier Automobiles Limited) was an Indian automotive manufacturer company, based in Mumbai. The company was owned by the Walchand Group and was established by Walchand Hirachand as Premier Automobiles Ltd (PAL) in 1944 with the encouragement and support of Sir. M. Visvesvaraya. The company was founded in 1903 as Walchand-Phatak Co. Later on, the name was changed to TATA Constructions. Further, after the exit of TATA's name was again changed to Premier which was engaged in work of contract & construction business. In October 1947, Premier Ltd manufactured the first Indian made trucks and cars rolled out onto the streets of independent India. Premier is well-known for its Premier Padmini which ruled the Indian car market and its popularity peaked during 1970s and 80s.

== History ==
The company was established in 1941 and negotiated with Chrysler Corporation for licenses to build a Plymouth car and a Dodge truck, sold under the Dodge, Plymouth, DeSoto, and Fargo names starting around 1949. In the early years, quality was considered good by both Chrysler and the Indian Department of Defense. In 1949, parts were being made in India, starting with simpler components and gradually building up to more complex pieces. Two companies made parts for these vehicles: Premier and Hindustan Motors of Calcutta. The early years of Premier and Hindustan were marked by very low sales, due to the size of the market; only about 20,000 vehicles per year were made in India, in 65 different models. To prevent foreign companies from dominating by mass-producing parts to be assembled into cars in India, the government set up steep import duties on imported parts in 1954, allowing Indian parts-makers to survive.

Premier licensed and manufactured a version of the Fiat 1100 D (beginning in 1964 continuing almost unchanged into the late 1990s). The car was initially marketed as a Fiat ("1100 Delight") and subsequently as the Premier Padmini with a 40 hp (30 kW) 1100 cc engine and manufactured at the now defunct Kurla factory in suburban Mumbai. Later models included the Premier 118NE (named after its 1171 cc Nissan A12 engine and with a transmission from the Nissan Cherry), a version of the 1960s Fiat 124 built in a then-new (but now defunct) factory at Kalyan. The 118NE was considered a mid-size luxury car in India until the influx of modern cars in the 1990s.

=== Liberalisation ===
With the Economic liberalisation in India, Premier teamed up with Peugeot to build an outdated model of the popular Peugeot 309 in India. Production began in 1998 and initial demand was high. Labour problems and poor dealer service led to problems that were compounded when Premier also aligned themselves with Fiat to manufacture the Fiat Uno. Peugeot pulled out of the venture around 2000 after only a few thousand cars sold. Labour and service issues also plagued the Fiat venture and a strike finally caused that plant to shut around 2001. Fiat and Premier faced severe criticism in the media. There were various criminal cases against its promoters and the consumer courts of India were flooded with complaints for non-refund of the car booking. The promoters of Premier Automobiles have also been confronted with criminal cases in various consumer courts of India under section 27 of the Consumer Protection Act. A customer association based at Gujarat-Rajkot called PAL Car Customer Association has made various representations against the Premier Automobiles Ltd.

In November 2004, Premier restarted operations by building a small diesel-powered van called the Sigma. It was based on a 1980s Mitsubishi Varica design licensed from China Motor in Taiwan, originally intended to be fitted with Peugeot's TUD5 diesel engine. The production version, as finally presented in late 2004, instead had a Hindustan-built 2-liter Isuzu diesel unit. It has 58 hp (43 kW) and is mated to a four-speed manual gearbox, while the car offers from five to nine seats. A multitude of other versions have since been developed, and as of December 2009 the engine has been replaced by a 1.5-liter IDI diesel (with or without turbo) or by the CNG-powered 1.8-liter 4ZB1 (both still manufactured by Hindustan). The facelift also meant improved suspension. There was also a pickup version of the Sigma, called the Premier Roadstar.

Premier was structured as two business segments: Engineering and Automotive. The Engineering segment focussed on - CNC Machine Division and Engineering, while the Automotive segment consists of light utility vehicles and sports utility vehicles. Originally based in Mumbai, it was using an ISO 9001 certified plant in Chinchwad, Pune. Spread over 27 acres, this plant was used as centralized research, development and manufacturing for all activities.

In October 2009, Premier re-entered the Indian passenger vehicle market with a compact SUV named RiO. Rio is assembled from CKD kits of Zotye Nomad I made by Zotye Auto of China, and went on sale in December 2009. The vehicle was a licensed copy of the first-generation Daihatsu Terios.

=== Insolvency and closure ===
In November 2018 the company filed for bankruptcy. Production of the RiO has been discontinued, and the land of the Pune factory was sold in 2019.

== Gallery ==
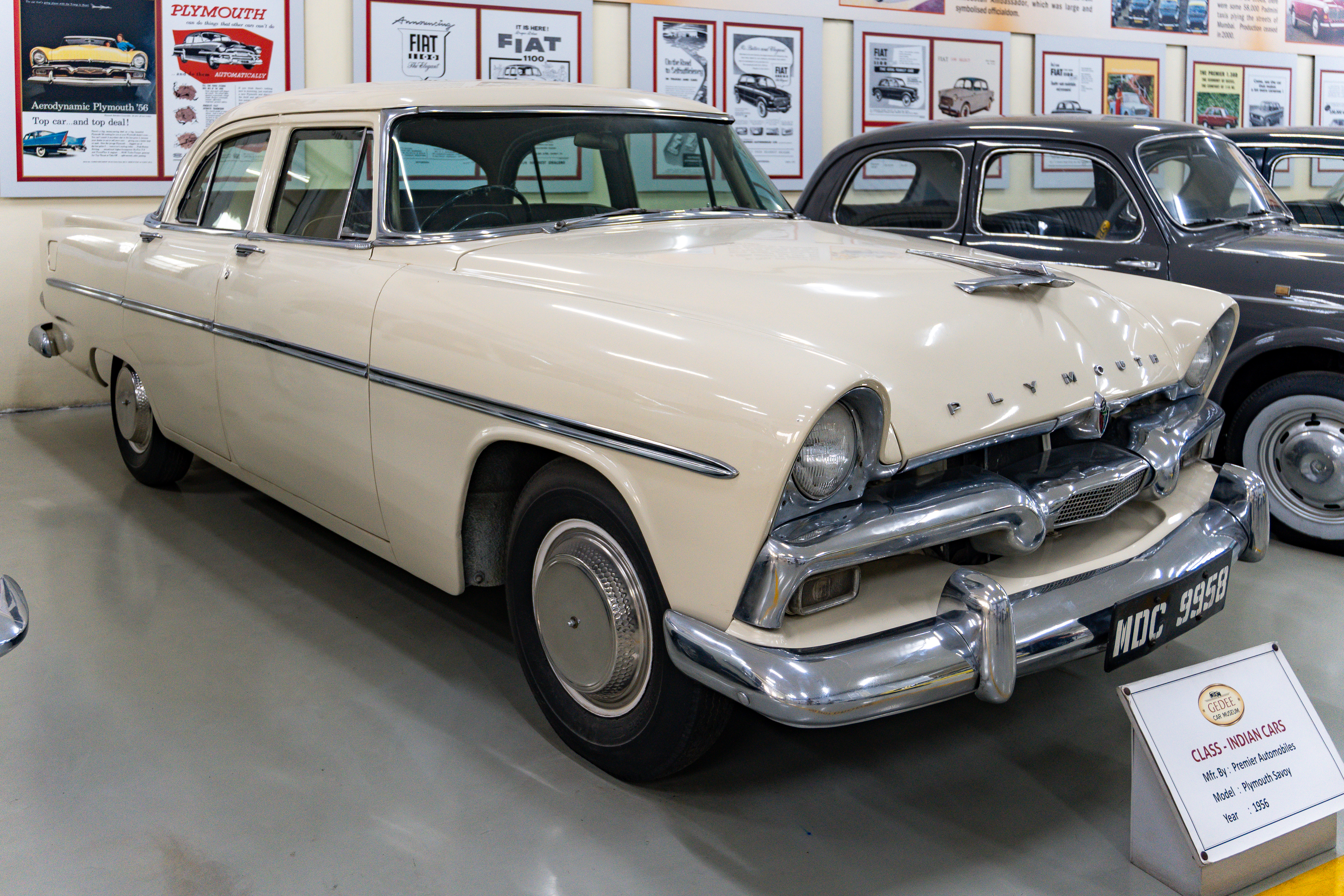
1956 Plymouth Savoy

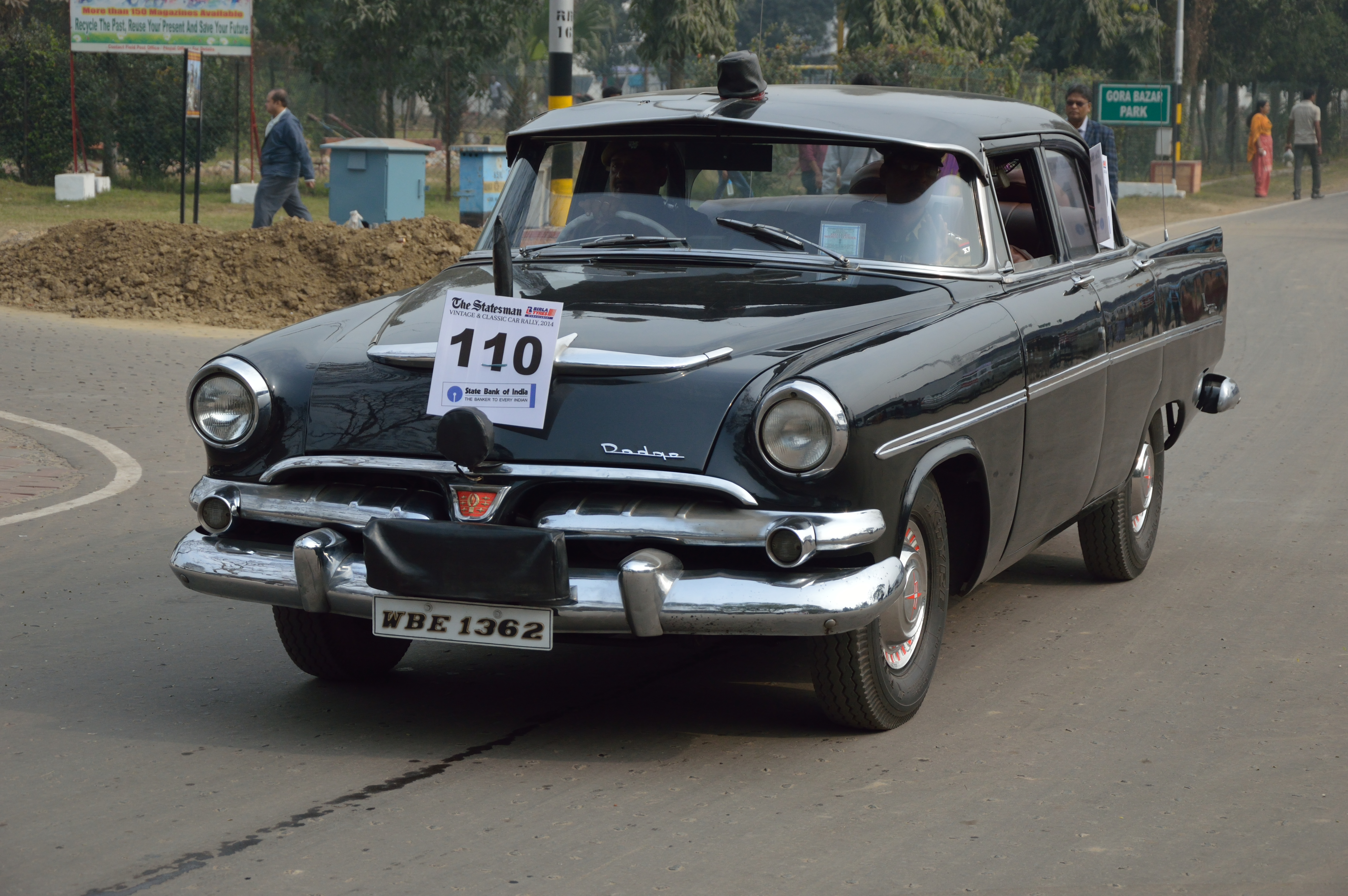
1956 Dodge Kingsway - 1956

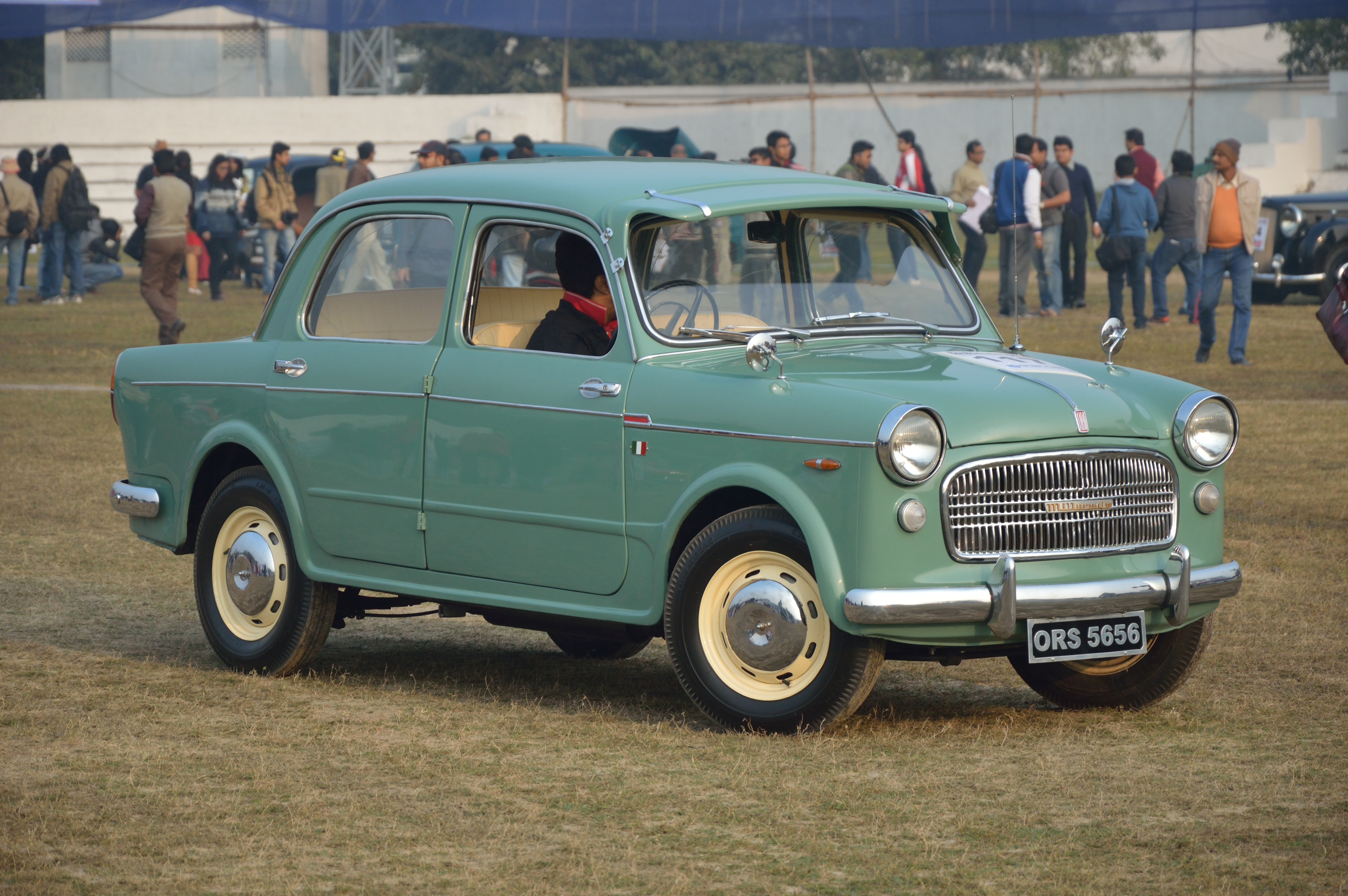
1959 Fiat 1100 Millecento

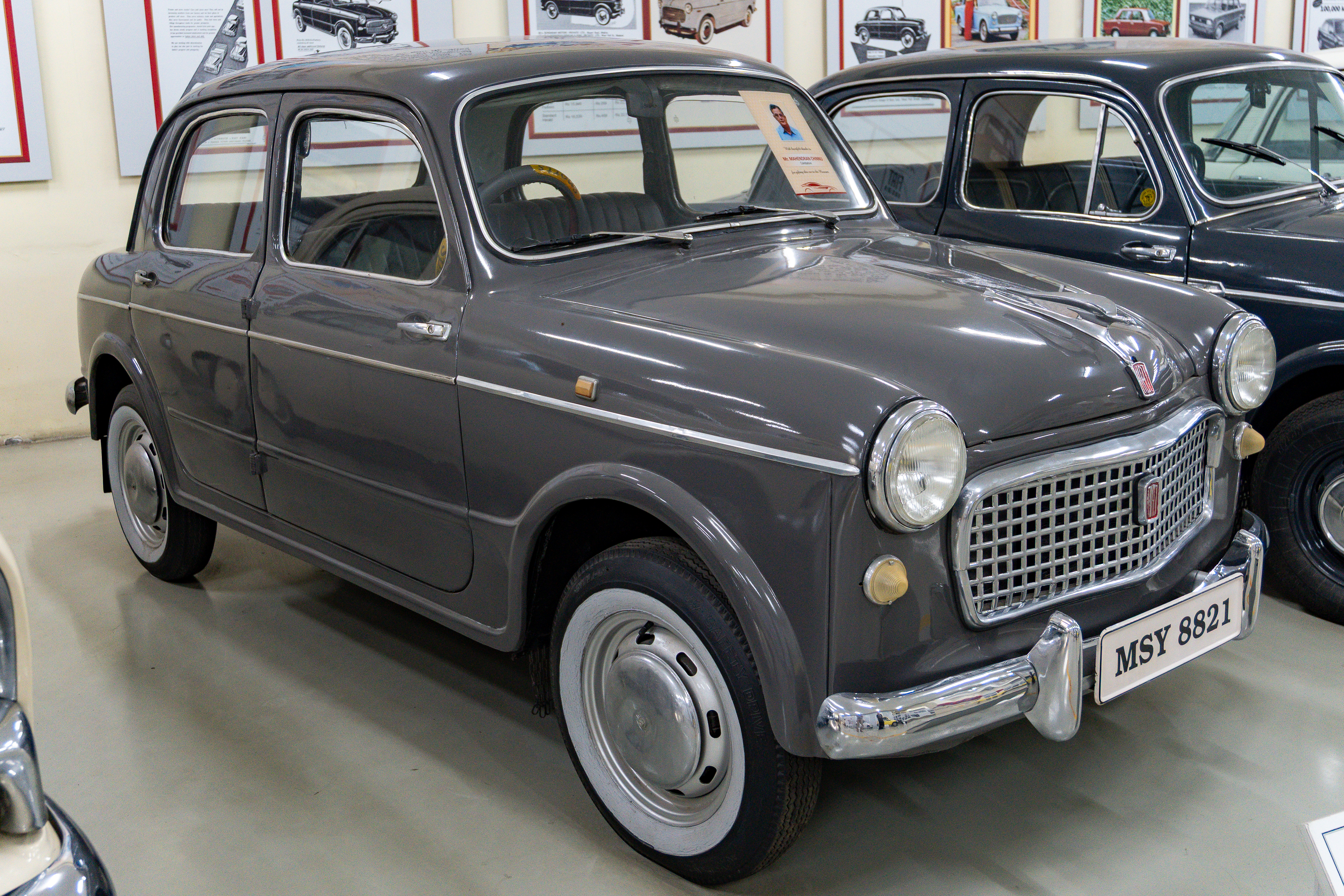
1955 Fiat 1100 Elegant

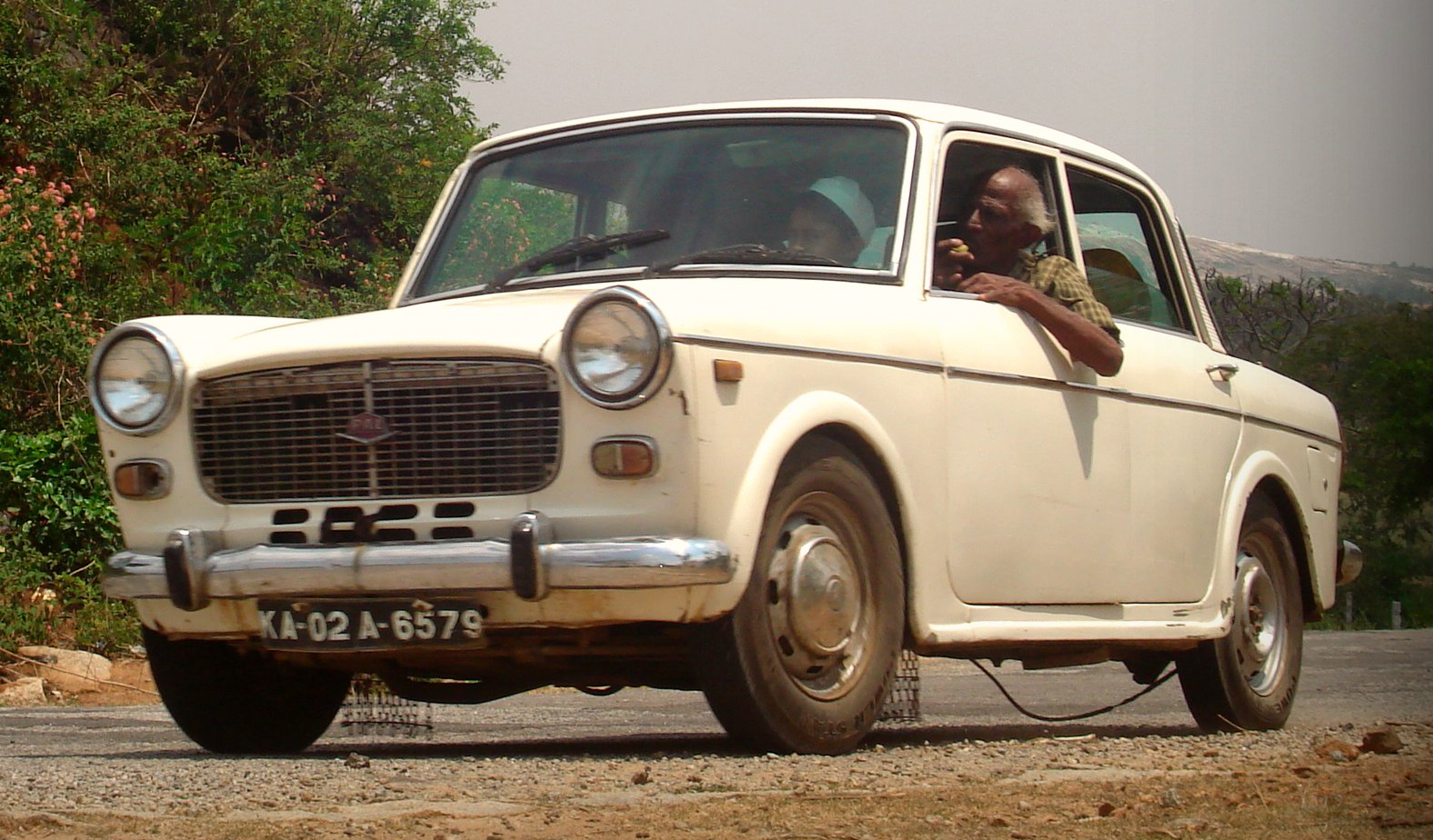
Premier Padmini

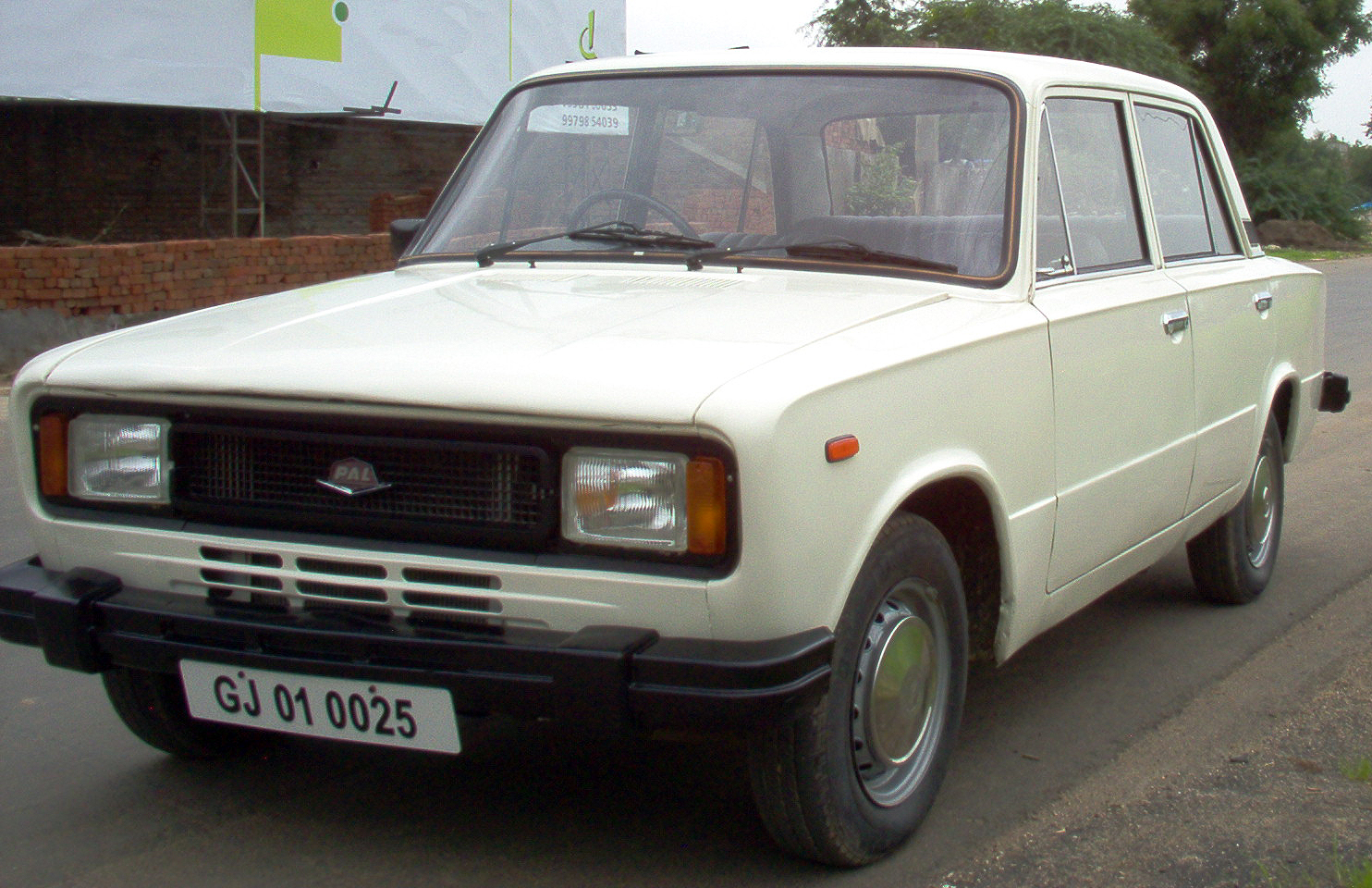
Premier 118NE

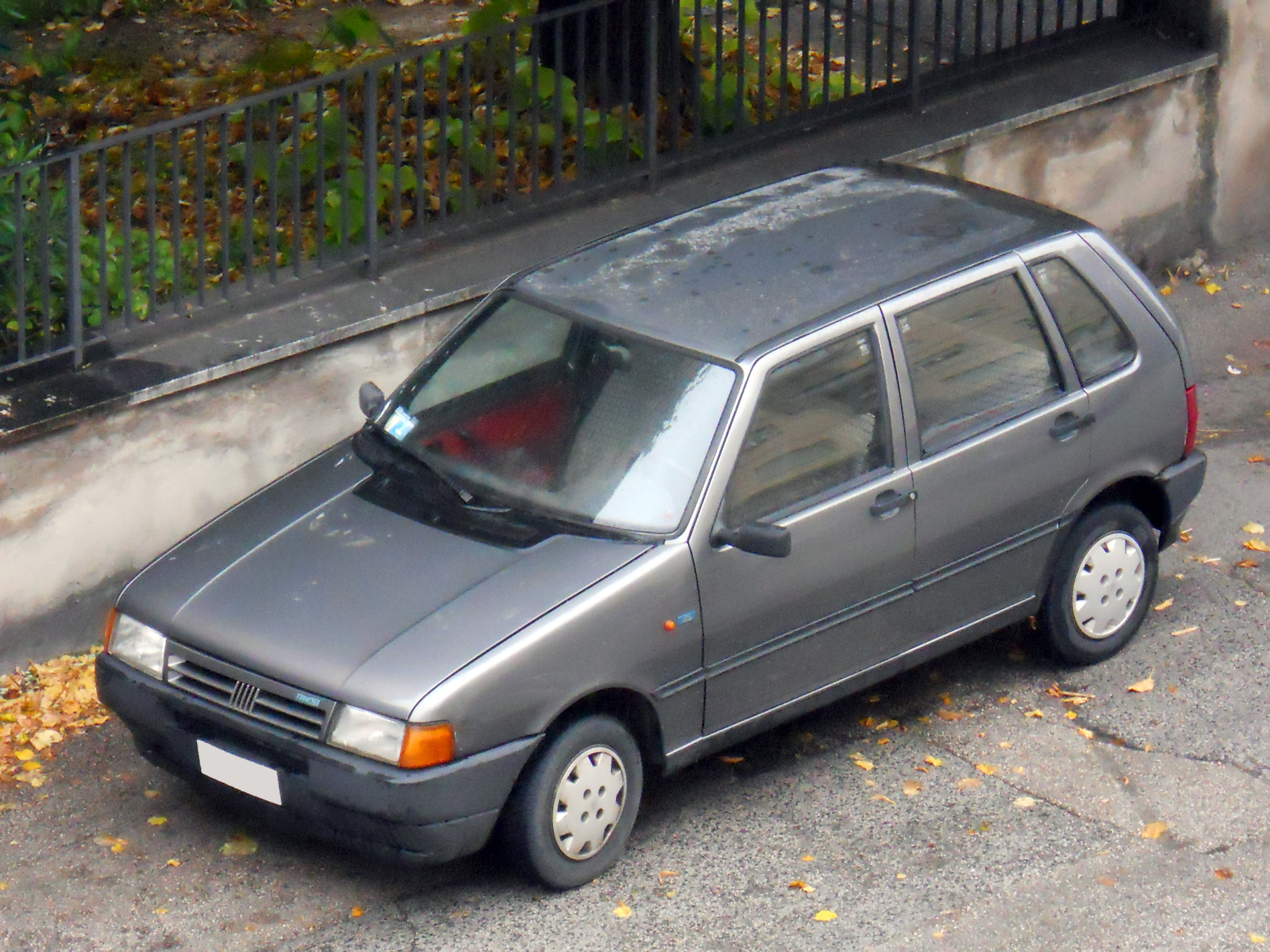
Fiat Uno

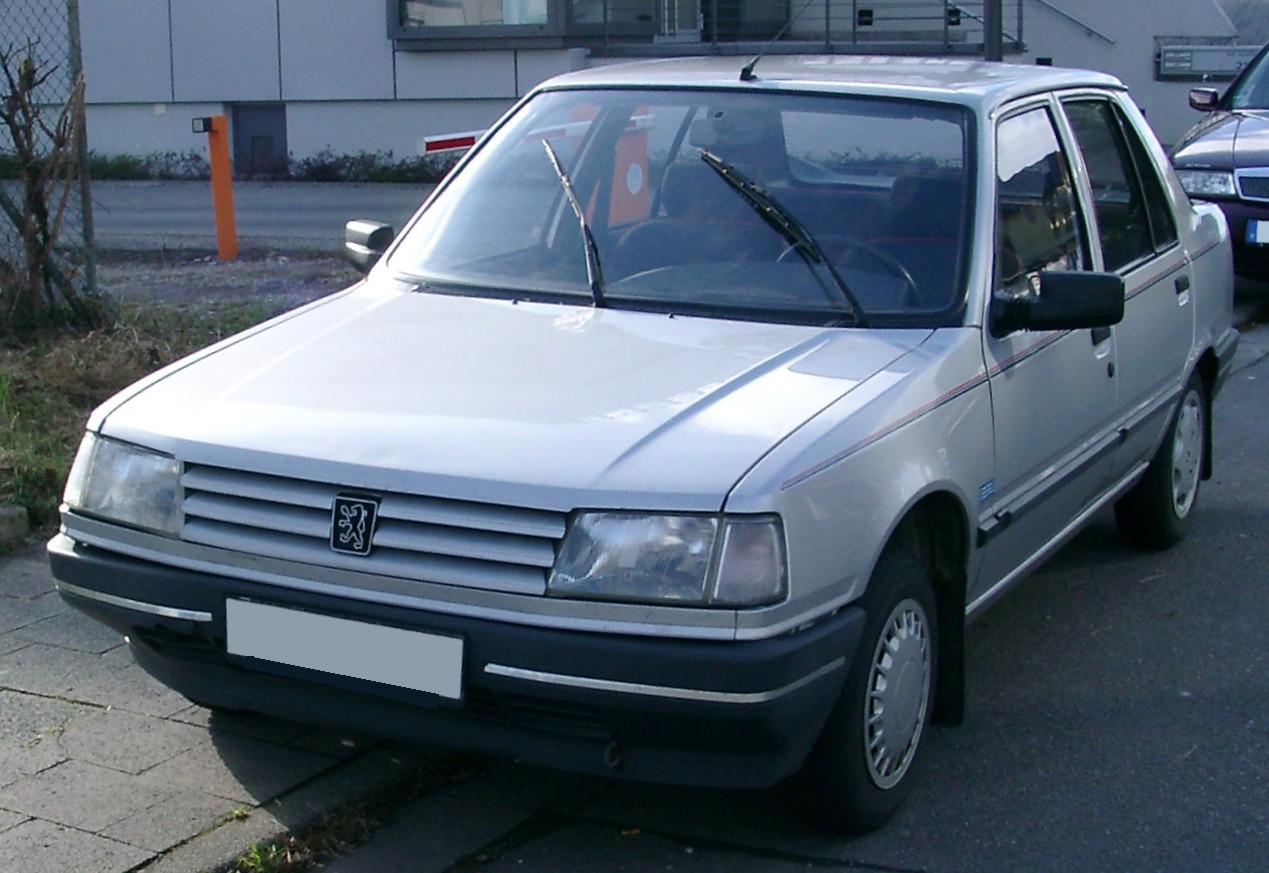
Peugeot 309

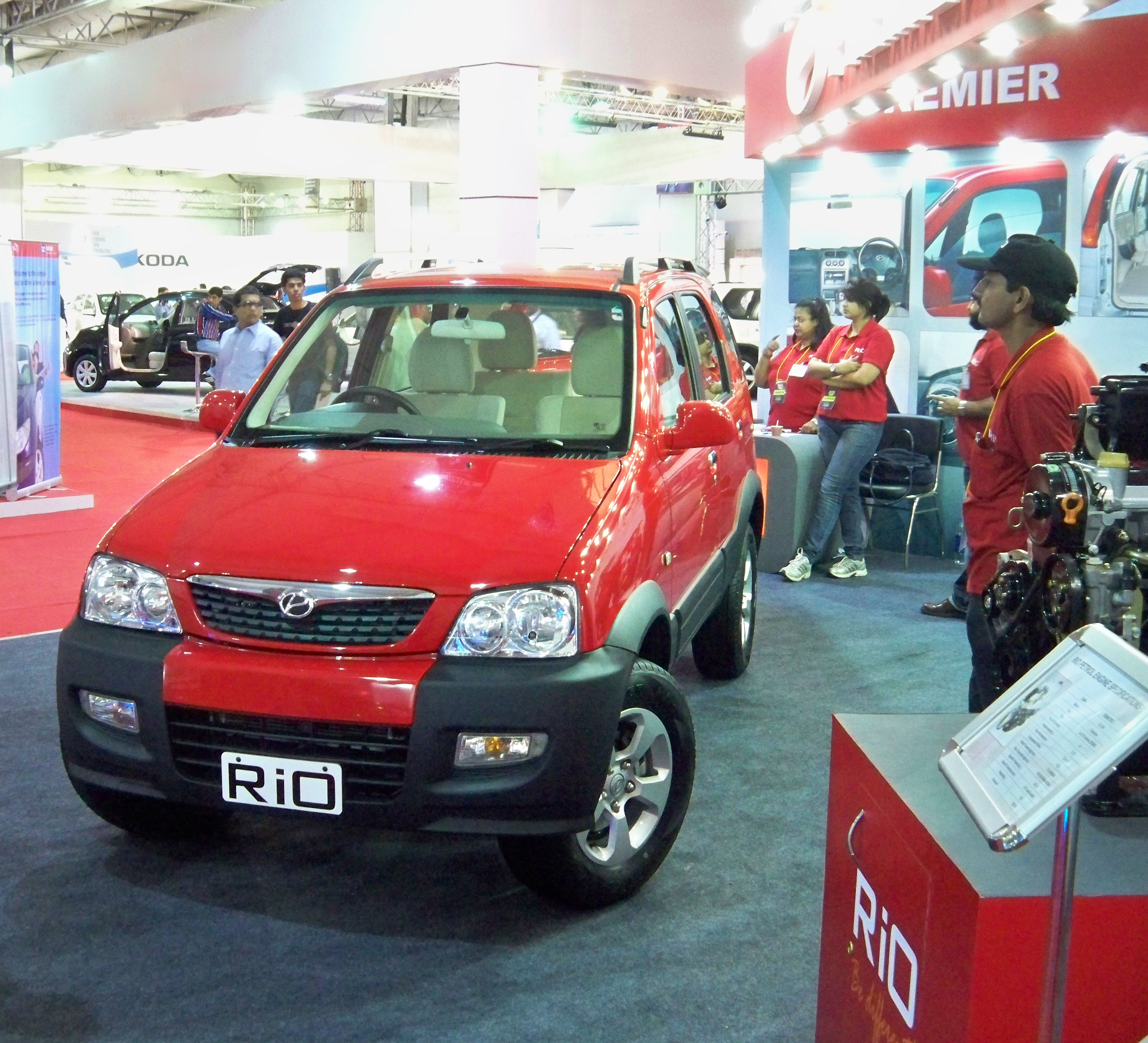
2012 Premier Rio

== Models ==
=== Assembled ===
- Dodge Kingsway
- Plymouth Savoy
- Plymouth Belvedere
- Fiat 1100
- Fiat Uno
- Peugeot 309

=== Early models ===
- Fiat Millecento (1100/103)
- Fiat Elegant (1100/103 E) with Chest light
- Fiat Select (1100/103 D - tailfin model) - 1958
- Fiat Super Select (1100/103 H) - 1961
- Fiat Delight (1100 D) - 1964

=== Previous models ===
There was also Premier President, that lasted for two or three years, while Padmini was transformed from 1100 D

- Premier Padmini - derived from Fiat 1100
- Premier 118NE - derived from SEAT 124
- Premier Sigma (a compact diesel MPV)
  - Premier Sigma Lifeline (an ambulance based on Sigma Platform)
  - Premier Sigma Express (a cargo carrier based on Sigma Platform)
  - Premier Sigma School Van (a Diesel or CNG school van based on Sigma Platform)
  - Premier Sigma Tourist Van (a Diesel or CNG tourist van based on Sigma Platform)
- Premier Rio (India's first compact diesel SUV, rebadged Zotye Nomad I)
- Premier Roadstar (a compact diesel pickup)
  - Premier Roadstar Tipper (open and closed body tipper)
