= Scindia Steam Navigation Company Ltd. =

Indian shipping company

House flag of Scindia Steam Navigation Company Ltd.

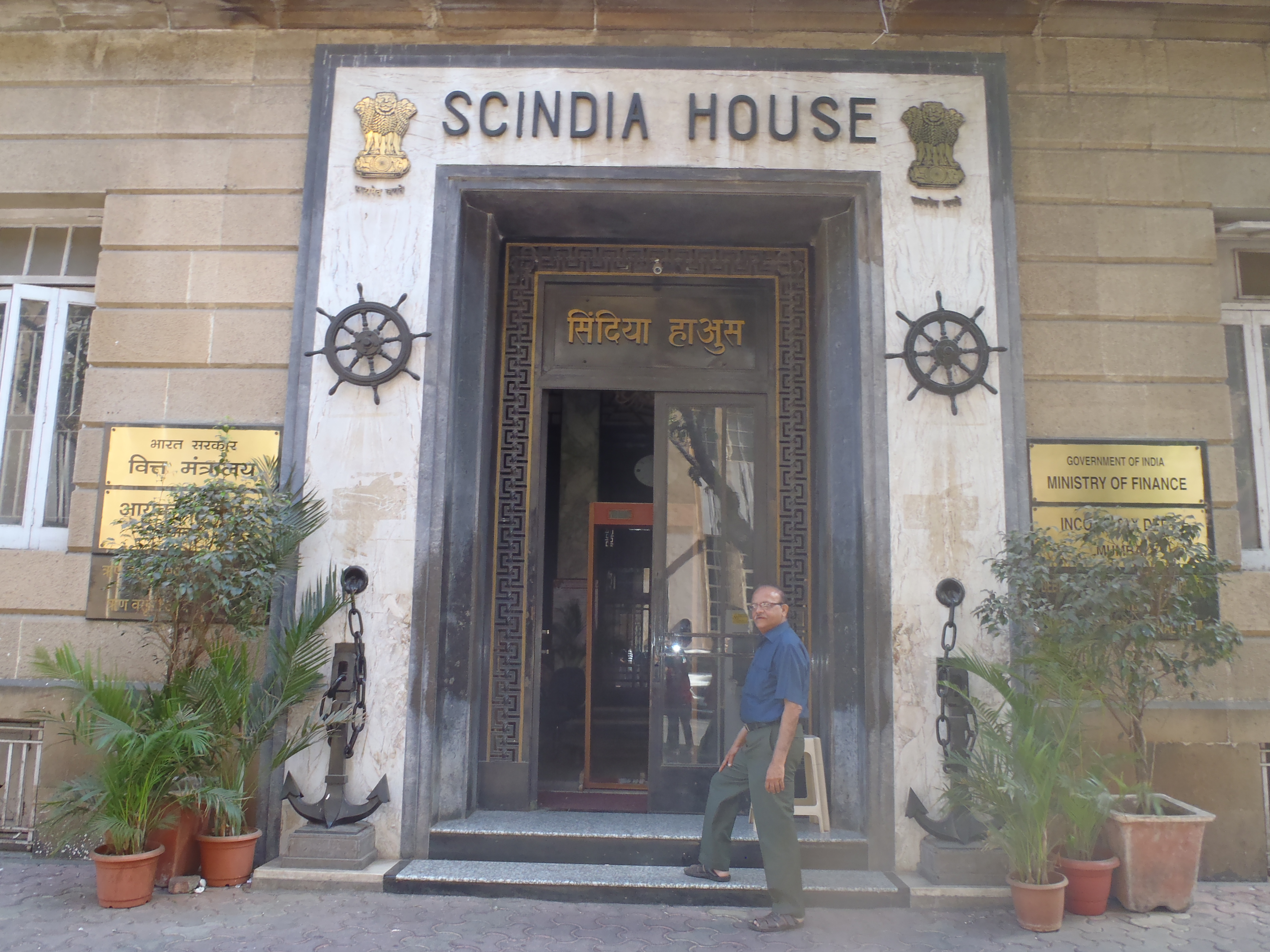
Scindia house - Ballard pier Mumbai closeup

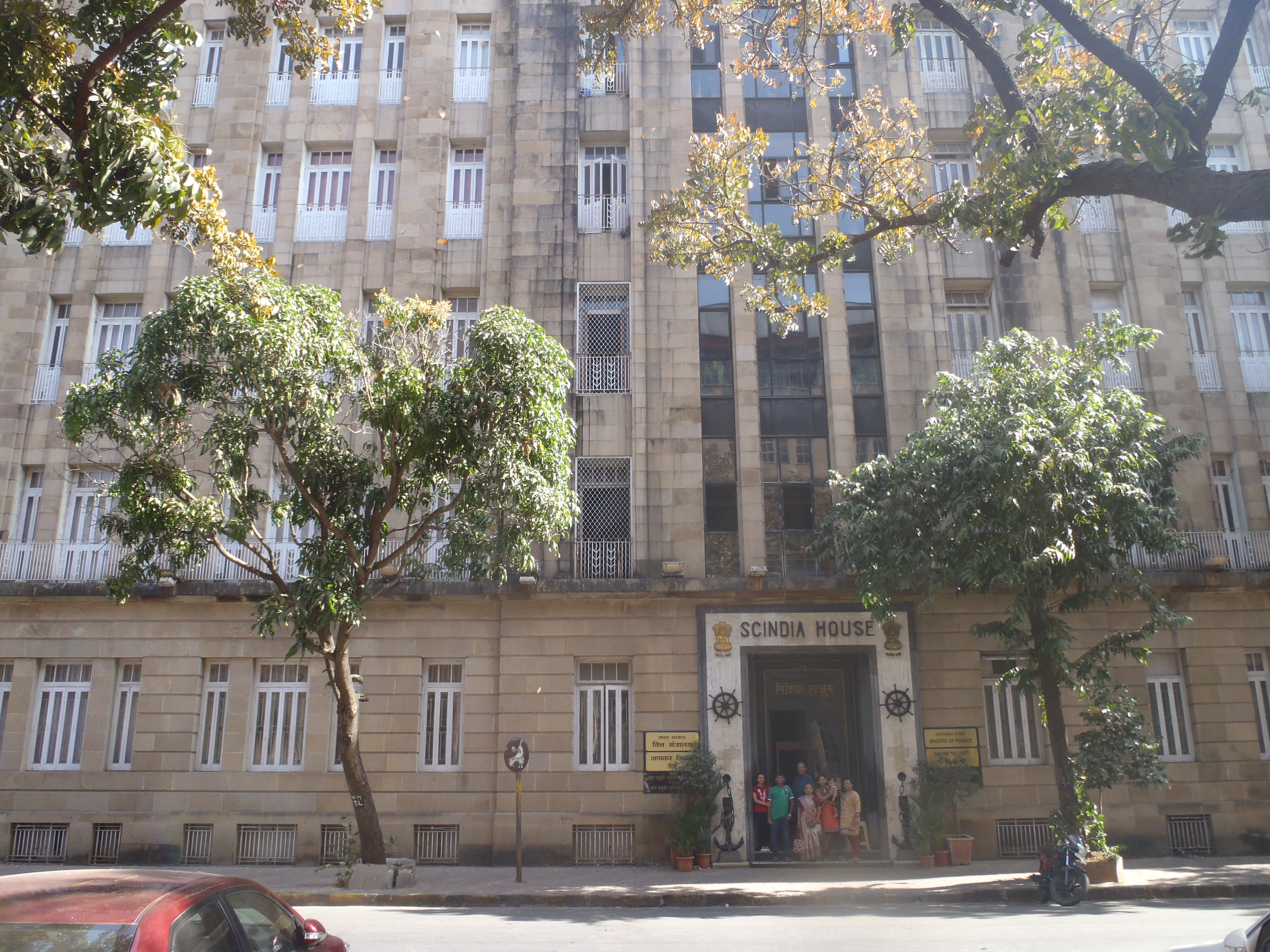
Scindia house - Ballard pier Mumbai full view

The Scindia Steam Navigation Company Ltd. was one of the first large Indian-owned shipping companies, established in 1919 by 4 industrialists - Walchand Hirachand, Narottam Morarjee, Lallubhai Samaldas and Kilachand Devchand. Its first vessel, the SS Loyalty, sailed from Bombay to London on 5 April 1919, marking the first time an Indian company operated a steamship service between India and the United Kingdom. The company later expanded to coastal and international routes and played an important role in developing India’s maritime industry. In the early 1940s, Scindia established the Scindia Shipyard at Visakhapatnam, which became a significant milestone in modern Indian shipbuilding and was later nationalized as Hindustan Shipyard Limited.

== History ==
=== Foundation and early years ===
On 19 December 1914, the RMS Empress of India was sold by Canadian Pacific Railway to the Maharaja of Gwalior. It was refitted as a hospital ship during World War I for Indian troops. On 19 January 1915, it was renamed Loyalty.

After World War I, prominent Indian businessmen including Walchand Hirachand, Narottam Morarjee, Kilachand Devchand, and Lallubhai Samaldas formed a syndicate to acquire the vessel Loyalty from Scindia of Gwalior. The Scindia Steam Navigation Company Ltd. was registered on 27 March 1919 with an authorised capital of Rs. 4.5 crore.

On 5 April 1919, SS Loyalty sailed from Bombay (now Mumbai) to the United Kingdom — the first voyage under an Indian-owned steamship to a foreign port under an Indian flag. This event is commemorated annually as India’s National Maritime Day, first observed in 1964.

The company began with passenger service but soon shifted focus to cargo shipping amid intense competition with British shipping lines, which held significant advantage in route control and freight rates. The early years involved overcoming legal, financial, and logistical challenges, but laid the foundation for India’s indigenous merchant fleet.

=== Expansion and competition ===
In 1932, the company purchased the Bengal Burma S.N. Co.; the company also purchased the Indian Co-operative Navigation & Trading Co., the Ratnagar S.N. Co., and in 1952 the Bombay S.N. Co. The company purchased shipyards in India in 1940, named Scindia Shipyard; its first ship, the 8000-ton Jalusha, was launched soon after independence by Jawaharlal Nehru in 1948.

=== Post war ===
The registered office is at Scindia Colony, Building III, Sir M.V. Road, Andheri (E), Mumbai-400069.

== Legacy ==
The National Maritime Day is celebrated in India on 5 April, the anniversary of the Loyalty's journey to the United Kingdom.

== Locality ==
- Scindia, Visakhapatnam
