= Indian Merchants' Chamber =

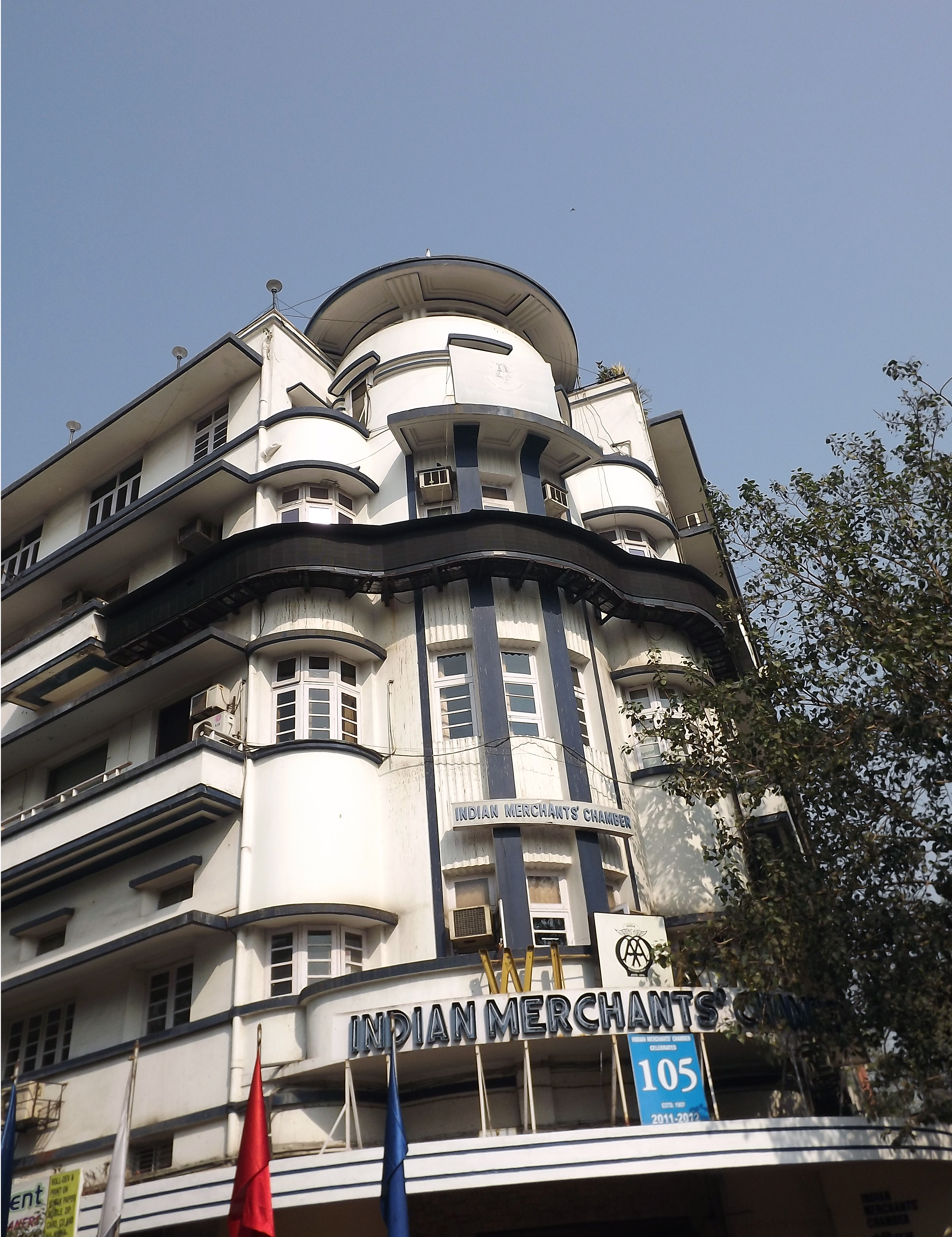
Indian Merchants' Chamber headquarters in Mumbai.

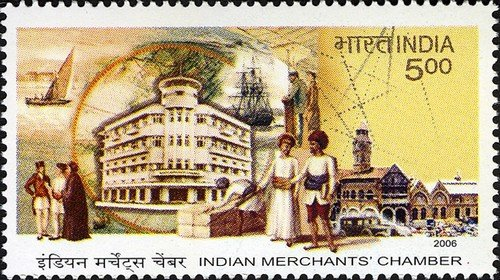
Stamp of India - 2006 Indian Merchants - Chamber

Indian Merchants' Chamber, established on 7 September 1907 in Mumbai, is an organization of India, representing interests of Indian trade, commerce, and industry. It was organized originally during the days of the British Raj to promote trade, commerce, and industry by Indian entrepreneurs. Sanjaya Mariwala, Executive Chairman and Managing Director of OmniActive Health Technologies Ltd. took over as the President of the IMC Chamber of Commerce and Industry in 2024. He succeeds Samir Somaiya, Chairman of K.J.Somaiya Trust who completed his tenure.

IMC has played a significant role in consolidating Indian business interests and making the Indian economy self-reliant. It kept pace with and, in its own way, became part of the Indian struggle for freedom. It was the Chamber's dedication that made Mahatma Gandhi patronise it and accept, in 1931, its honorary membership — a rare honour bestowed upon any chamber of commerce in the country.

Today, its institutional records are part of the Archives at the Nehru Memorial Museum & Library, at Teen Murti House, Delhi.

On 7 September 2006, India Post issued a commemorative postage stamp to mark its centenary.

== See also ==
- Confederation of Indian Industry
- FICCI
