= Walchandnagar Industries =

Indian company

Walchandnagar Industries Limited
- Type: Public company
- Traded as: BSE: 507410; NSE: WALCHANNAG
- Industry: Energy; Defense; Aerospace; Nuclear power Industrial & Marine Transmissions; Propulsion systems
- Founder: Walchand Hirachand Doshi
- Headquarters: Mumbai, India
- Products: Boilers; Power Generation
- Services: EPC; Turnkey projects
- Revenue: ₹9.64 billion (US$100 million) (2010–11)
- Net income: ₹169 million (US$1.8 million) (2010–11)
- Parent: Walchand group
- Website: www.walchand.com

Walchandnagar Industries Limited (WIL) (NSE: WALCHANNAG, BSE: 507410) is a heavy engineering products and EP&C services company, based in Mumbai, Maharashtra.

== History ==
Walchandnagar Industries was founded by Walchand Hirachand Doshi in 1908.

WIL was subject to sanctions by the United States following Pokhran-II for its involvement in India's nuclear and space programs. The sanctions were dropped in 2001.
