= Hindustan Construction Company =

Construction company based in Mumbai, India pvt ltd

Hindustan Construction Company Limited (HCC Limited)
- Type: Public
- Traded as: BSE: 500185; NSE: HCC
- ISIN: INE549A01026
- Founded: 27 January 1926; 100 years ago
- Founder: Walchand Hirachand
- Headquarters: Hincon House, LBS Marg, Vikhroli (West), Mumbai, India
- Key people: Ajit Gulabchand (Chairman); Arjun Dhawan (Vice Chairman & Managing Director); Rahul Shukla (CFO); Nitesh Kumar Jha (Company Secretary)
- Revenue: ₹5,603 crore (US$580 million) (2025)
- Net income: ₹113 crore (US$12 million) (2025)
- Number of employees: 1,049 (2024)
- Subsidiaries: HCC Infrastructure Co. Ltd
- Website: www.hccindia.com

Hindustan Construction Company Limited (HCC) is an Indian multinational engineering and construction company headquartered in Mumbai, Maharashtra, India. The company was founded by Industrialist Seth Walchand Hirachand in 1926.

HCC has executed a majority of India’s landmark infrastructure projects, including 29% of India’s hydropower capacity, over 65% of India’s nuclear power generation capacity, 3,800 km of roads and expressways, 375 bridges and 337 km of complex tunnelling.

Ajit Gulabchand is the current Chairman of the company while Arjun Dhawan is the Vice Chairman and Managing Director.

== History ==
=== Founding and early years ===
The company was founded by Seth Walchand Hirachand in 1926, when it received a contract to construct the Bhor Ghat Tunnel on the Mumbai-Pune railway line. The tunnel was completed in 1928.

In 1993, Ajit Gulabchand took control of the company due to internal family problems.

=== Timeline ===
- 1954 - Maharashtra's first dam after independence: Vaitarna dam, Maharashtra
- 1954 - India's first bridge: railway bridge across river Torsa, Assam
- 1954 - India's first water treatment plant in Mumbai
- 1956 - India's first thermal plant for Tata, Mumbai
- 1966 - India's first barrage: Sone barrage, Bihar
- 1967 - India's first port: impounded dock for Haldia, West Bengal
- 1971 - World’s longest barrage: Farakka barrage, West Bengal
- 1971 - India's first nuclear power plant: Rajasthan Atomic Power Project – Unit 1&2
- 1971 - India’s first integrated steel plant: Bhilai, Madhya Pradesh
- 1975 - India's first underground power house: Yamuna Power House, Uttarakhand
- 1977 - Idukki double curvature dam, Kerala
- 1983 - India’s largest water treatment plant: Bhandup, Mumbai
- 1983 - India’s largest rail coach factory in Kapurthala, Punjab
- 2009 - India’s first Sea Link bridge: Bandra Worli Sea Link, Mumbai
- 2010 - India's largest nuclear power plant: Kundankulam nuclear power plant, Tamil Nadu
- 2011 – India’s first strategic crude oil storage cavern: Vizag Oil Cavern; Andhra Pradesh
- 2012 – India's highest altitude Hydro Power projects: Nimoo Bazgo & Chutak Hydro Power Projects, Jammu & Kashmir
- 2013 – India’s longest transportation tunnel: Pir Panjal Railway Tunnel, Jammu & Kashmir
- 2014 – India’s second strategic crude oil storage cavern: Padur Oil Cavern, Karnataka
- 2016 – NHPC’s first RCC dam: Teesta Low Dam Stage IV Project, West Bengal
- 2018 – Largest EPC contract of NHPC: Kishanganga Hydro Power Project, J&K
- 2018 – India’s longest Rail-cum-road Bridge: Bogibeel Bridge; Assam

== Subsidiaries ==
HCC Infrastructure Co. Ltd. is the infrastructure arm of HCC engaged in the creation and management of premium assets in transportation.

== Controversies ==
=== Financial stress and defaults ===
Hindustan Construction Company has faced financial challenges, including high debt levels and delayed payments from clients. In the late 2010s, the company reported significant outstanding dues and arbitration claims from public sector undertakings, which it said contributed to liquidity stress. In early 2020, HCC disclosed defaults on long-term loans and cash credit facilities, resulting in overdue obligations to banks and its classification as a non-performing asset by at least one lender, raising concerns about its debt-servicing capacity.
