= Concern (organisation) =

Student organisation at Indian Institute of Science

- Formation: 1994
- Type: Student Organisation
- Headquarters: Indian Institute of Science, Bangalore
- Location: Bangalore, India

Concern is a student organisation in Indian Institute of Science, which tries to generate debate on socio-politico-economic issues in the academic and scientific community of Bangalore. Over the years, it has been fairly active both at generating awareness and lending support to people's movements.

== History ==
It was started in the year 1994 by a group of students from Indian Institute of Science who took part in the Narmada Bachao Andolan. It is still based out of Indian Institute of Science with a membership spanning across several other institutes.

== Activities ==
- Active role in social movement Narmada Bachao Andolan.
- Role in Free software movement.
- Role in Nonadanga Anti-eviction Struggle.
- Role in raising awareness through a series of talks, panel discussions and documentary screenings.
- Role in Anti-UID Aadhaar card protests.
- In 2014, Concern, along with Pedestrian Pictures, MARAA and National College, Basavanagudi organised the International Uranium Film Festival in Bangalore.

=== Documentaries Screened ===
- Citizenfour : 10 April 2015
- Final Solution (2003 film) by Rakesh Sharma : 31 January 2015.
- Garam Hawa : 6 December 2014
- Quarter No. 4/11 : 4 September 2014
- Father, Son, and Holy War : 18 November 2013
- Izzatnagari ki Asabhya Betiyan : 27 September 2013
- Many People, Many Desires : 18 June 2013
- Jai Bhim Comrade : 27 April 2013
- 3D Stereo Caste : 18 April 2013
- Dr. Babasaheb Ambedkar : 15 April 2013
- In God's Land : 19 March 2013
- Inside Job : 19 December 2012
- Ram Ke Naam : 12 December 2012
- The Revolution will not be Televised : 20 November 2012
- Death of Merit : 29 August 2012
- Psywar : 6 June 2012
- Nero's Guests : 3 March 2011
- Mullaitivu Saga : 14 February 2011
- Tales from the margins : 20 December 2010
- Jashn-e-Azaadi : 15 November 2010
- Radiation Stories : 10 August 2010
- Red Alert: The War Within : 7 November 2009
- Why We Fight (2005 film) by Eugene Jarecki : 10 November 2008.
- Pee (Shit) by Amudhan R P : 26 September 2007.
- Mayana Kurippugal (Notes from the Crematorium) by Amudhan R P : 26 September 2007.

=== Talks/Panel Discussions ===
- 9 October 2015 : Silence of Scientists-a boon for scamsters by Dr.Narendra Nayak
- 24 July 2015: Science communication in Silukkapati by Prof. R. Ramanujam
- 26 May 2015: New Land Acquisition Bill 2015 by Vijoo Krishnan.
- 13 February 2015: We and our Nationhood redefined by Anand Patwardhan.
- 22 September 2014: Crime and Punishment by Dr. Usha Ramnathan.
- 12 September 2014: Science and Society: Karnataka Anti-superstition Bill by Dr. G. Ramakrishna and Prof. R. Ramanujam.
- 3 July 2014: A 'Peep' at another India by Dr. Reetika Khera.
- 9 April 2014: Solidarity across Continents: Role of British Left in Indian Independence, A Talk by Prof. Andrew Thorpe.
- 10 February 2014: Right to Education and Beyond by Dr. Anil Sadgopal.
- 28 January 2014: Excluding farmers from agriculture!, Understanding Indian agrarian crisis and policy shifts by Dr. Vijoo Krishnan
- 15 January 2014: Panel discussion on IPC 377 Judgement, Sexuality and Gender.
- 24 October 2013: Sexual Harassment at workplace by Aarti Mundkur.
- 8 October 2013: Reflections on present and future of nuclear technology: Development and Science in dialogue by Dr. Sabyasachi Chatterjee and Dr. Suvrat Raju.
- 25 July 2013: Elusive Justice: Cases from Bijapur and Gadchiroli by Dr. Bela Bhatia.
- 19 July 2013: Global recession and its Aftermath - Panel Discussion by Taki Manolakos and Prof. Srinivas Raghavendra.
- 27 June 2013: Globalization and Left Politics in India by Prof. G. Haragopal.
- 30 May 2013: Questions of Environment and Development by V. S. Krishna.
- 21 February 2013: 'Fuelling India's Internal Wars: The Story of Chhattisgarh' by Sudha Bharadwaj.
- 14 September 2012: Food Security Act: The food vs. cash debate by Dr. Reetika Khera.
- 3 March 2011: Discussion with Palagummi Sainath over rising farmer suicides in India
- 5 December 2007: The Global War on Terror & Human Rights Violations by Prof. B. P. Das.
- 17 November 2007: Lets have a deal: A Nuclear Deal by Dr. M. V. Ramanna.
- 12 September 2007: Dr. Ambedkar's vision for India: How far have we accomplished it? by Ramachandra Guha.

== Issues of Concern ==
Issues of concern is a regular newsletter of the organisation. It covers the activities of concern and issues that need awareness.
