= India's Struggle for National Shipping =

- Directed by: Paul Zils
- Produced by: Shanti Kumar Morarjee
- Cinematography: P. V. Pathy
- Production company: The Scindia Steam Navigation Company Ltd.
- Release date: August 1947
- Running time: 30 minutes (197 metres)
- Country: India
- Language: Hindi

India's Struggle for National Shipping is an Indian documentary and corporate film released in August 1947. It was directed by German filmmaker Paul Zils and produced by The Scindia Steam Navigation Company Ltd.

== Production ==
Paul Zils was German film maker and was on his way to Indonesia during World War II. His steamer hit by a torpedo by an Indian naval ship and he was brought to India as prisoner of war. As his conduct was good, he was released in 1946. He joined the Indian Films Information (later Indian Films Division) and also founded the Indian Documentary Producers' Association.

The film was produced by The Scindia Steam Navigation Company Ltd. owned by industrialist Shanti Kumar Morarjee, a Bhatia. The film was sponsored by his wife Sumati Morarjee. The film was created by Zils Documentary Unit India. It was produced on the instigation of Jawaharlal Nehru to celebrate independence of India. It is considered as the first shipping as well as corporate film of India.

== Content ==
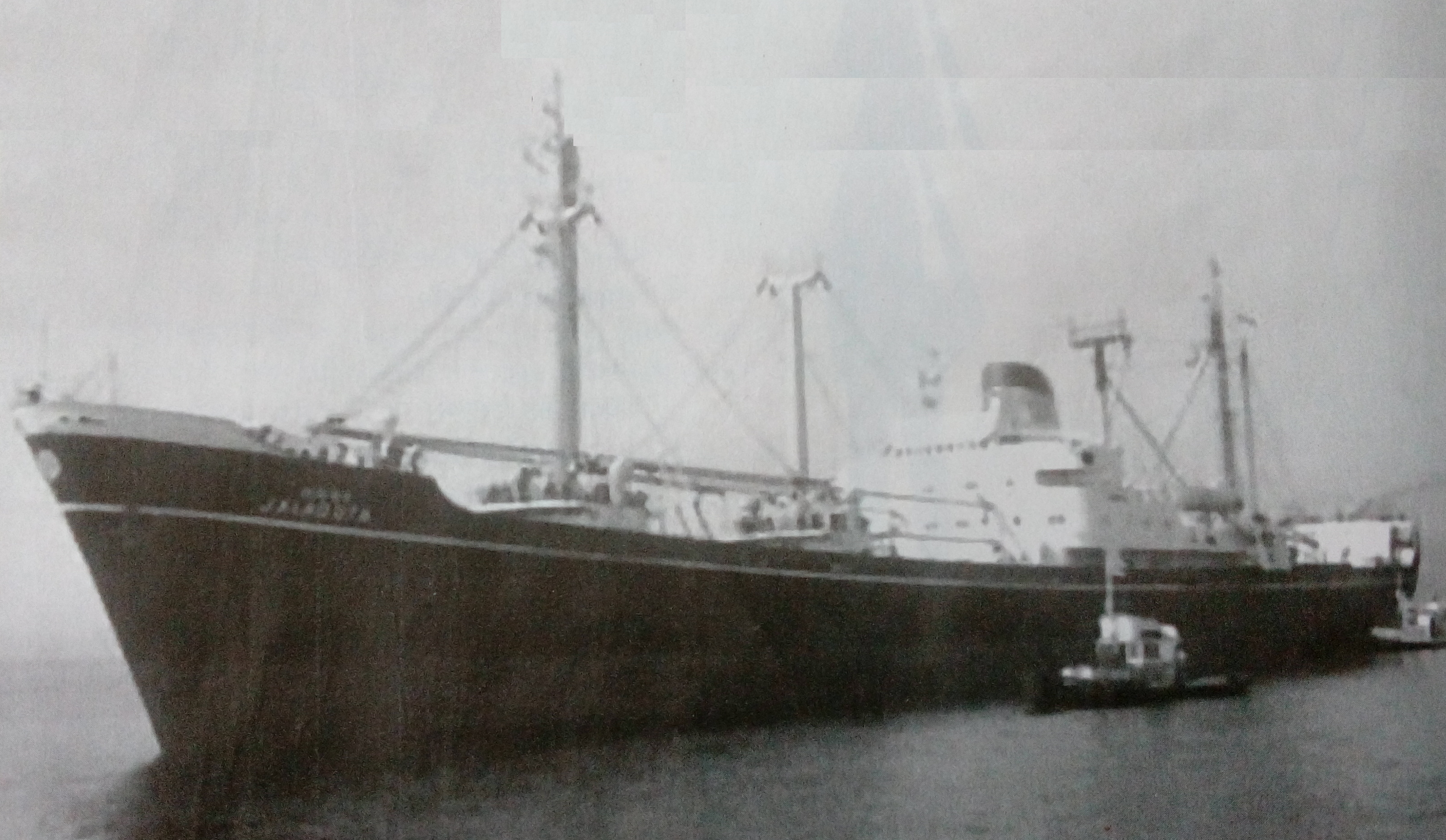
Still of Jalabala from film

The films features archival coverage and some new footage shot by P. V. Pathy. It opens with a scene of Arabian Sea from Bhaucha Dhakka, a wharf along the Thane Creek and Bhatiya family getting down from the steamer. The film narrates the struggles of Indian shipping industry which was suppressed by the British authorities for long time. It also includes the archival footage of opening of Scindia House in 1938 by Vallabhbhai Patel and Shanti Kumar Morarjee welcoming him. The chairman Walchand Hirachand says at the event that the company will stay Swadeshi (native) in any situation. Bhulabhai Desai inaugurates the bust of Narottam Morarjee, the founder and the first chairman of Schindia. Vithalbhai Patel is seen performing ceremonial ship launching of Jalabala, the first ship of Schindia constructed in Glasgow in 1927. The occasion was attended by Nehru along with his whole family including then seven-year old Indira Gandhi. It also includes a scene of launching of El-Madina, a steamer for Hajj pilgrims. In one scene, Muhammad Ali Jinnah is seen coming out of Scindia House. The film also features Mahatma Gandhi and his Swadeshi Movement. In one scene, Rajendra Prasad is getting of the train and goes to open the Scindia Shipyard at Visakhapatnam. The occasion was attended by Sumati Morarjee, Sarojini Naidu, Acharya Kriplani and more than 3000 guests. The last scene depicts the board meeting of Scindia which included members like Mararjee himself, Walchand Hirachand, Tulsidas Kilachand, Maneklal Premchand, general manager M. A. Master.

== Release and rediscovery ==
The film was released during the week of independence of India on 15 August 1947. The 197-metre-long film was later certified U (Unrestricted Public Exhibition) by the Central Board of Film Certification on 4 December 1979. The film was lost and forgotten over the years.

Mumbai-based Films Division had assigned the creation of a database of more than 8000 documentary films to Shubhash Chheda and Amrit Gangar in the 1990s. Gangar noted the documentary films produced on various subjects like agriculture, dairy industry and steel industry but he could not find a film on shipping. After research, he found some information on a shipping film produced by The Scindia Steam Navigation Co. Ltd. and directed by Paul Zils. In 2002, he was sponsored by Max Mueller Bhavan in Mumbai to write a book on Zils. He found that the Scindia House in Ballard Pier, then the company headquarter is now owned by the Government of India and the company has shifted to smaller office in Scindia Colony, Andheri. He found an ex-employee named Choksi in Scindia Colony who remembered watching the film but believed that the film may have not survived as the large number of artifacts were thrown away while shifting to new office. Gangar tried to search in Chor Bazar but he could find only stationary, paperweights and prototype of steamers produced by Scindia. After some months, he was contacted by Choksi who informed him that he had found three containers with may contain the said film. The containers had negatives with sound tracks. Gangar contacted a German technician working in Prasad Labs in Mumbai. He made the positives and restored the film. In 2003, the restored film was screened at the Max Mueller Bhavan along with the launch of his book Paul Zils and the Indian Documentary. The copy of film is also submitted to National Film Archive of India. Gangar was recognised for his efforts in preserving the film.
