= SiGNS Film Festival =

Short and documentary film festival

SiGNS Film Festival is one of the short film and documentary film festivals in India. The tenth edition was conducted in October 2018 in association with the Kochi-Muziris Biennale

== Festival organization ==
FFSI-Keralam is one of the five chapters of the Federation of Film Societies of India started by Satyajit Ray. Unlike the other four (namely, Eastern, Western, Northern, and Southern India), FFSI-Keralam is a State chapter. It is funded by the government of Kerala, has its own library of film DVDS, and has 99 film societies affiliated to it, in addition to hosting its own film festival. Chelavur Venu, V. K. Joseph, and K.S. Prasannakumar are the president, secretary, and treasurer, respectively.

== Jury members over the years ==
- SiGNS 2020: Suma Josson (chairperson), Amudhan R P, and Surabhi Sharma
- SiGNS 2019: Supriyo Sen (chairperson), Baburaj, and Dr Asha Joseph
- SiGNS 2018: K.G. JAYAN (chairperson), GEORGEKUTTY. A.L, and B. Ajithkumar
- SiGNS 2017: Amrit Gangar (chairperson), Dr Meena T. Pillai, and Amudhan R P
- SiGNS 2016: Rakesh Sharma (chairperson), Premendra Mazumder, and Fowzia Fathima
- SiGNS 2015: Deepa Dhanraj (chairperson), Gitanjali Rao, and Oindrilla Hazra
- SiGNS 2014: Madhusree Dutta (chairperson), Riyas Komu, and K.B. Venu
- SiGNS 2013: Girish Kasaravalli (chairperson), Amrit Gangar, and P. Baburaj
- SiGNS 2012: R.V. Ramani, (chairperson), G.P. Ramachandran, Susmesh Chandroth, and Shyni Jacob Benjamin
- SiGNS 2011: K.R. Mohanan (chairperson), Amudhan R P, Mini Sukumar, Vinod Sukumaran, and K.Y. Radhalakshmy
- SiGNS 2009: Arun Khopkar (chairperson), Chalam Bennurkar, and B. Ajithkumar
- SiGNS 2007: Kumar Shahani (chairperson), T.K. Rajeev Kumar, and C. S. Venkiteswaran
- SiGNS 2006: Saeed Akhtar Mirza (chairperson), Beena Paul Venugopal, and M.R. Rajan
- SiGNS 2005: Adoor Gopalakrishnan (chairperson), Chandita Mukherjee, and Sunny Joseph
