= List of Indian film critics =

This is a list of notable Indian film critics

- Anna M. M. Vetticad
- Anupama Chopra
- Baradwaj Rangan (The New Indian Express, The Hindu)
- Bikas Mishra
- Chidananda Dasgupta
- C. S. Venkiteswaran (The Hindu)
- Derek Bose
- K. N. T. Sastry
- [[Kamaal Rashid Khan KRK ]]
- Komal Nahta
- Kozhikodan (Mathrubhumi, Chandrika)
- Madhu Eravankara
- Mathures Paul (The Statesman)
- Mayank Shekhar
- Namrata Joshi (Outlook)
- Nikhat Kazmi (The Times of India)
- Premendra Mazumder
- Rajeev Masand (CNN-IBN)
- Randor Guy, The Hindu
- R. K. Bidur Singh
- Sanjit Narwekar
- Shubhra Gupta
- Sucharita Tyagi
- Taran Adarsh
- Utpal Datta
- Vasiraju Prakasam
- Vijayakrishnan
- V. K. Joseph
- Ziya Us Salam

== See also ==
- National Film Award for Best Film Critic
