= SS Jalabala =

A number of steamships were named Jalabala, including:

- SS Jalabala (1927), an Indian cargo ship torpedoed and sunk in 1943
- SS Jalabala (1945), an Indian coaster in service 1954–64
