= German submarine U-532 =

German World War II submarine

History

Nazi Germany
- Name: U-532
- Ordered: 15 August 1940
- Builder: Deutsche Werft, Hamburg
- Yard number: 347
- Laid down: 7 January 1942
- Launched: 26 August 1942
- Commissioned: 11 November 1942
- Fate: Surrendered on 13 May 1945 at Loch Eriboll in Scotland, then Loch Ryan. Sunk on 9 December 1945

General characteristics
- Class & type: Type IXC/40 submarine
- Displacement: 1,144 t (1,126 long tons) surfaced; 1,257 t (1,237 long tons) submerged
- Length: 76.76 m (251 ft 10 in) o/a; 58.75 m (192 ft 9 in) pressure hull
- Beam: 6.86 m (22 ft 6 in) o/a; 4.44 m (14 ft 7 in) pressure hull
- Height: 9.60 m (31 ft 6 in)
- Draught: 4.67 m (15 ft 4 in)
- Installed power: 4,400 PS (3,200 kW; 4,300 bhp) (diesels); 1,000 PS (740 kW; 990 shp) (electric)
- Propulsion: 2 shafts; 2 × diesel engines; 2 × electric motors
- Speed: 18.3 knots (33.9 km/h; 21.1 mph) surfaced; 7.3 knots (13.5 km/h; 8.4 mph) submerged
- Range: 13,850 nmi (25,650 km; 15,940 mi) at 10 knots (19 km/h; 12 mph) surfaced; 63 nmi (117 km; 72 mi) at 4 knots (7.4 km/h; 4.6 mph) submerged
- Test depth: 230 m (750 ft)
- Complement: 4 officers, 44 enlisted
- Armament: 6 × torpedo tubes (4 bow, 2 stern); 22 × 53.3 cm (21 in) torpedoes; 1 × 10.5 cm (4.1 in) SK C/32 deck gun (180 rounds); 1 × 3.7 cm (1.5 in) SK C/30 AA gun; 1 × twin 2 cm FlaK 30 AA guns

Service record
- Part of: 4th U-boat Flotilla; 11 November 1942 – 31 March 1943; 2nd U-boat Flotilla; 1 April 1943 – 30 September 1944; 33rd U-boat Flotilla; 1 October 1944 – 8 May 1945
- Identification codes: M 50 614
- Commanders: F.Kapt. Ottoheinrich Junker; 11 November 1942 – 13 May 1945
- Operations: 4 patrols: 1st patrol: 25 March – 15 May 1943; 2nd patrol: 3 July – 30 October 1943; 3rd patrol: a. 4 January – 19 April 1944; b. 17 – 18 May 1944; c. 1 December 1944; 4th patrol: 13 January – 13 May 1945
- Victories: 8 merchant ships sunk (46,895 GRT); 2 merchant ships damaged (13,128 GRT)

German submarine U-532 was a Type IXC U-boat of Nazi Germany's Kriegsmarine during World War II.

She was laid down at the Deutsche Werft (yard) in Hamburg as yard number 347 on 7 January 1942, launched on 26 August and commissioned on 11 November with Kapitänleutnant Ottoheinrich Junker in command.

U-532 began her service career with training as part of the 4th U-boat Flotilla from 11 November 1942. She was reassigned to the 2nd flotilla for operations on 1 April 1943, then the 33rd flotilla on 1 October 1944.

She carried out four patrols, sank eight ships and damaged two others. She was a member of three wolfpacks.

She surrendered on 13 May 1945 at Loch Eriboll in Scotland; she was then transferred to Loch Ryan for Operation Deadlight. She was sunk on 9 December 1945.

== Design ==
German Type IXC/40 submarines were slightly larger than the original Type IXCs. U-532 had a displacement of 1,144 tonnes (1,126 long tons) when at the surface and 1,257 tonnes (1,237 long tons) while submerged. The U-boat had a total length of 76.76 m (251 ft 10 in), a pressure hull length of 58.75 m (192 ft 9 in), a beam of 6.86 m (22 ft 6 in), a height of 9.60 m (31 ft 6 in), and a draught of 4.67 m (15 ft 4 in). The submarine was powered by two MAN M 9 V 40/46 supercharged four-stroke, nine-cylinder diesel engines producing a total of 4,400 metric horsepower (3,240 kW; 4,340 shp) for use while surfaced, two Siemens-Schuckert 2 GU 345/34 double-acting electric motors producing a total of 1,000 shaft horsepower (1,010 PS; 750 kW) for use while submerged. She had two shafts and two 1.92 m (6 ft) propellers. The boat was capable of operating at depths of up to 230 metres (750 ft).

The submarine had a maximum surface speed of 18.3 knots (33.9 km/h; 21.1 mph) and a maximum submerged speed of 7.3 knots (13.5 km/h; 8.4 mph). When submerged, the boat could operate for 63 nautical miles (117 km; 72 mi) at 4 knots (7.4 km/h; 4.6 mph); when surfaced, she could travel 13,850 nautical miles (25,650 km; 15,940 mi) at 10 knots (19 km/h; 12 mph). U-532 was fitted with six 53.3 cm (21 in) torpedo tubes (four fitted at the bow and two at the stern), 22 torpedoes, one 10.5 cm (4.13 in) SK C/32 naval gun, 180 rounds, and a 3.7 cm (1.5 in) SK C/30 as well as a 2 cm (0.79 in) C/30 anti-aircraft gun. The boat had a complement of forty-eight.

== Service history ==
=== First patrol ===
The boat departed Kiel on 25 March 1943, moved through the North Sea, negotiated the gap between Iceland and the Faroe Islands and entered the Atlantic Ocean. There, east of Greenland, she was intercepted by the escorts of Convoy ONS 5 and damaged in a 15-hour engagement.

She entered Lorient on the French Atlantic coast on 15 May 1943.

=== Second patrol ===
Her second foray involved a move to the Far East. Departing Lorient on 3 July 1943, she had rounded Africa by the 27th and entered the Indian Ocean. On 19 September she sank Fort Longueuil southwest of the Chagos Archipelago (south southwest of the Indian mainland). Two Indian crewmen, the only survivors, came ashore on a raft in Sumatra, after spending 134 days adrift; they became prisoners of the Japanese on 1 February 1944.

U-532 went on to sink other ships, such as the Tahsinia, (using the deck gun) on 1 October 1943, northeast of the Maldive Islands. She also damaged British Purpose south of Mangalore on the 20th. This ship fell out of line in her convoy after being hit; the following vessel in the line, the California Standard, struck her a glancing blow but the damage was slight.

The submarine docked in Penang, in Malaya (now Malaysia) on 30 October 1943. She was in the first wave of U-boats in the newly formed Monsun Gruppe operating out of Japanese-occupied Penang.

=== Third patrol ===
The pickings continued to be rich; amongst other victims, she sank Tulagi northeast of Cape Comorin in southern India on 27 March 1944. The ship capsized and sank in less than 30 seconds.

U-532 moved from Penang to Singapore in May 1944 and on to Batavia (now Jakarta in Indonesia) in December.

=== Fourth patrol ===
For her fourth sortie, the boat sank Baron Jedburgh on 10 March 1945 and the Oklahoma on the 28th. She returned to Europe in May following the German capitulation.

== Fate ==
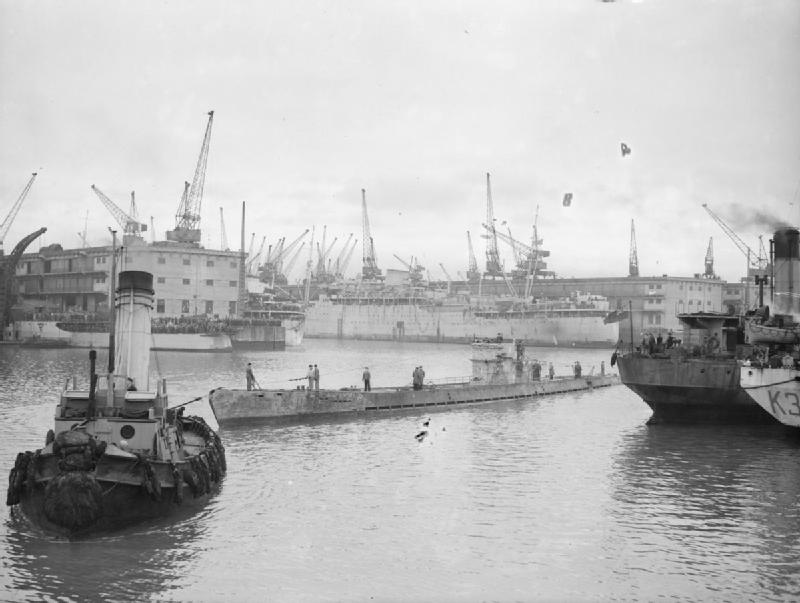
U-532, a Type IXC/40 submarine. Photographed entering Gladstone Dock, Liverpool after surrender to the Royal Navy.

The submarine docked at Liverpool on 10 May 1945 before moving to Loch Eriboll and to Loch Ryan (both in Scotland) on the 17th, for Operation Deadlight. She then arrived at Barrow in Furness on 25 May 1945 under the escort of HMS Grindall, departing again on 7 June 1945 escorted by HMS Gardiner.

She was sunk at 56°08′N 10°07′W by a torpedo from the British submarine Tantivy on 9 December 1945.

== Summary of raiding history ==
Date	Ship Name	Nationality	Tonnage (GRT)	Fate
19 September 1943	Fort Longueuil	United Kingdom	7,128	Sunk
29 September 1943	Banffshire	United Kingdom	6,479	Sunk
1 October 1943	Tahsinia	United Kingdom	7,267	Sunk
11 October 1943	Jalabala	British India	3,610	Sunk
20 October 1943	British Purpose	United Kingdom	5,845	Damaged
11 January 1944	Triona	United Kingdom	7,283	Damaged
26 January 1944	Walter Camp	United States	7,176	Sunk
27 March 1944	Tulagi	United Kingdom	2,281	Sunk
10 March 1945	Baron Jedburgh	United Kingdom	3,656	Sunk
28 March 1945	Oklahoma	United States	9,298	Sunk

== Bibliography ==
- Busch, Rainer; Röll, Hans-Joachim (1999). German U-boat commanders of World War II : a biographical dictionary. Translated by Brooks, Geoffrey. London, Annapolis, Md: Greenhill Books, Naval Institute Press. ISBN 1-55750-186-6.
- Busch, Rainer; Röll, Hans-Joachim (1999). Deutsche U-Boot-Verluste von September 1939 bis Mai 1945 [German U-boat losses from September 1939 to May 1945]. Der U-Boot-Krieg (in German). Vol. IV. Hamburg, Berlin, Bonn: Mittler. ISBN 3-8132-0514-2.
- Gröner, Erich; Jung, Dieter; Maass, Martin (1991). U-boats and Mine Warfare Vessels. German Warships 1815–1945. Vol. 2. Translated by Thomas, Keith; Magowan, Rachel. London: Conway Maritime Press. ISBN 0-85177-593-4.
