= Paul Zils =

German documentary filmmaker (1915–1979)

Paul Zills
- Born: Paul Zills; 18 June 1915; Wuppertal, German Empire
- Died: 30 March 1979 (aged 63); Munich, West Germany
- Citizenship: Germany (former); India
- Occupation: Filmmaker

Paul Zils (18 June 1915 – 30 March 1979) was a German-Indian documentary filmmaker who played a major role in the development of the Indian documentary filmmaking movement.

== Career ==
Early in his career, Zils reportedly worked for UFA, before leaving Germany. During World War II, he was interned in a POW camp as a German national in Bali and then brought to India where he was interned in Bihar. In 1946, Zils reportedly first began working in India as director of the external unit of the Information Films of India and then for a dozen of years after independence, working both for the new Indian government and for international institutions and multinationals, shuch as Shell Film Unit. For example, Zils worked for the documentary unit of the United Nations to produce films acquired by the Government of India for widespread distribution using mobile projectors, such as Kurvandi Road and A Tiny Thing Brings Death. He made films in the Major Industries, Life in India, and Folk Dances series for Burmah-Shell Oil. Zils established the independent production company, Art Films of India.

Zils sponsored the publication of a quarterly magazine, Indian Documentary, and contributed regularly to the leading art journal of the era, MARG. He also provided training to a number of associates and colleagues who went on to become noted filmmakers themselves, such as Fali Balimoria whose The House That Ananda Built was the first Indian documentary to be nominated for the Oscars. In 1958, he returned to West Germany and made flms under the Deutsche Condor Films lavel and later made films in Sri Lanka.

He became a naturalised Indian citizen during the 1950s during his time in India where he was based in Bombay.

== Filmography ==
=== Directed and/or Produced by Him ===
- 1945: Bombay, the Story of Seven Isles
- 1947: Community
- 1947: India's Struggle for National Shipping
- 1948: Mother-Child-Community
- 1947: Child
- 1948: Kurvandi Road
- 1949: General Motors in India
- 1949: The Last Jewel
- 1949: A Tiny Thing Brings Death
- 1949: White Magic
- 1949: Two Worlds
- 1950: Hindustan Hamara
- 1950: Our India
- 1952: Zalzala
- 1952: Shabash
- 1954: Ujala
- 1955: Agriculture
- 1955: Textiles
- 1956: The Ripening Seed
- 1956: Iron and Steel
- 1956: The School
- 1956: Growing Coconuts, in the 1956 Cannes short film competition
- 1957: Fisherfolk of Bombay
- 1957: A Family in Bangalore, part of the Life in India series
- 1957: Fifty Miles from Poona
- 1957: Maa, the Story of an Unmarried Person
- 1957: New Life of a Displaced Person
- 1957: Martial Dances of Malabar, part of the Folk Dances series
- 1958: Worship Dances of Malabar, part of the Folk Dances series
- 1958: In Your Hands, Family Planning Association of India, director Fali Balimoria
- 1958: Oraons of Bihar
- 1958: The Vanishing Tribe
- 1961: Jalagon--Ein Dorf im Ikken Indien
- 1963: Buddhismus in Ceylon
- 1963: Alles in Fluß (Kurz-Dokumentarfilm)
- 1964: Glaube und Leben der Hindus
- 1968: Meditation
- 1970: Time and the Nation
- 1975: For a Better Tomorrow

=== As Second Unit Director ===
- 1936: Glückskinder
- 1937: Sieben Ohrfeigen
- 1937: Fanny Elssler
