= Ashish Avikunthak =

Indian filmmaker, film theorist, and archaeologist (born 1972)

Ashish Avikunthak (born Ashish Chadha, 1972) is an Indian avant-garde filmmaker, film theorist, archaeologist and cultural anthropologist. His works have been screened at art galleries and private screenings, including Tate Modern, Centre George Pompidou, Pacific Film Archive; along with Rotterdam, Locarno, London film festivals, among others. He is a professor of film media at Harrington School of Communication, University of Rhode Island. In 2025, he received the Ground Glass Award from Prismatic Ground, the New York–based festival of experimental documentary and avant-garde film, in recognition of his "outstanding contributions to the field of experimental media."

He is considered to be an iconoclastic film artist who works outside Indian mainstream cinema. His films explore Indian philosophy and existentialism and are categorized by their use of unorthodox cinematography and editing. Avikunthak films are rooted in Indian religion, epistemology, ritual and form. Mythical, metaphysical, metaphorical and mundane elements are found in his work. ArtReview describes his works as: "Avikunthak's works insist on an Indian epistemology while utilising a rigorously formal visual language that is clearly aware of Western avant-garde practices such as those of Andrei Tarkovsky and Samuel Beckett. These are self-consciously difficult works that are filmed in a self-consciously beautiful way." In his essay "Cinema of Prayoga", Amrit Gangar names Avikunthak's films as an example of his eponymous strain of filmmaking.

== Early life ==
Ashish Avikunthak was born in Jabalpur in 1972 and was raised in Kolkata. He did his B.A. in social work from Bombay University in 1994, during this time worked with Narmada Bachao Andolan. He later studied archaeology in Deccan College, Pune. He did his PhD from Stanford University in cultural anthropology and then taught at Yale.

== Short films ==
Avikunthak began his filmmaking career with short films made between 1995 and 2010. He created a body of work that explored ideas of ceremonial rituals, banality and the inter-relationships between selves and the concepts of 'community' and 'politicality' by challenging conventional forms of representations. His first film Et Cetera was a tetralogy consisting of four one-shot films made on 16mm, between 1995-97 - Renunciation, Soliloquy, Circumcision and, The Walk. Each of these films explores the dialectic between screen/film time and real time to examine actions as ritual. His next 16mm film, Kalighat Fetish won the best documentary award at the Tampere Film Festival in 2001, which dealt with rituals of animal sacrifice and cross-dressing in the context of Kalighat Kali Temple in Kolkata.

In 2002, Avikunthak adapted Samuel Becket's enigmatic dramaticule Come and Go into a 16mm short film in Hindi called Antaral (End Note). In an analysis of the film in relationship to the play Arka Chattaopadhya writes: "Ashish Avikunthak's adaptation introduces a fascinating element of play into the Beckettian structure of this displacement and illumines significant nuances about its potential continuation…Avikunthak's deconstructive play unmakes Beckett's structure on the one hand, then on the other, the precision of the Beckettian structure responds to this element of play by implicating Avikunthak's structure in the braiding principle central to its own operation."

His 2010 film, Vakratunda Swaha premiered at the International Film Festival Rotterdam was featured at the Taipei Biennial 2012 and was long listed for The Skoda Prize in 2011. Maurizio Calbi of University of Salerno, Italy writing about Avikunthak's practice of this period notes that in his films, "(a) ritual quasi-mythical quality of everyday life emerge(s); of letting the 'ordinary' continually re-mark itself in its singularity as 'extra-ordinary.'"

== Feature films ==
Avikunthak's first feature film Nirakar Chhaya (Shadows Formless) had its world premiere at the Locarno Film Festival in 2007. It is a Bengali language film that was adapted from Sethumadhavan's award winning Malayalam language novel Pandavapuram, translocated to Kolkata from Kerala. His 2010 Hindi language film, Katho Upanishad was an adaptation that transformed 6th century BCE Sanskrit language philosophical treatise Katha Upanishad into a triptych of three one-shots, with the longest being a 58-minute single-shot.

In 2013, Avikunthak made India's first one-shot feature film – Rati Chakravyuh. The entire film was made in a single-shot measuring 102 minutes. Made in Kolkata, it is a Bengali language film, in which six newlywed couples on their wedding night sit in a circle with a priestess in an ancient temple and have a protracted exchange before they commit mass suicide. The film had its world premiere at the 2014 Shanghai Biennale.

In 2015, Avikunthak released Kalkimanthakatha that was shot on location in the Allahabad Kumbh Mela in 2013. In this feature film, Samuel Beckett's celebrated play Waiting for Godot is transplanted from its European context to Bengali language and the Hindu pilgrimage site of the Kumbh Mela. This film was stopped from a private screening in a Kolkata art gallery by the Central Board of Film Certification in 2017. In a review published in Artforum, art critic Murtaza Vali, writes that: "through this film, Avikunthak orchestrates a somewhat unexpected encounter between opposing perspectives or bodies of knowledge—sacred/secular, modernity/tradition, philosophy/politics—the friction between them forcing each to open up to the wisdom of the other. And by using an uncompromisingly difficult avant-garde form and structure to explore Hindu thought and ritual practice, the film troubles ongoing attempts by fundamentalists to assert definitive orthodox interpretations onto a religion defined by its rich multiplicities."

In 2017, Avikunthak's film Kali of Emergency which he made a year before had its world première in Forum Expanded in Berlin International Film Festival. In the screening of this film at International Film Festival Rotterdam in 2023, it noted that: "Kali of Emergency juxtaposes two kinds of Hindu iconography, mingling the elaborately costumed, stylised gods of popular representations with the austere forms found in pre-modern paintings and temple sculptures...Filled with incandescent images, Kali of Emergency is of a piece with Avikunthak's singular, personal body of work." Glossary of Non-Human Love was shown at International Film Festival Rotterdam in 2021. It is a film that "is set in a parallel universe where artificial intelligence has usurped humanity's reign over the planet…Glossary of Non-Human Love can also be viewed as an ecocritical commentary on technological evolution. Due to the fragmented glossary structure and its exploration of AI, it almost feels like code is being parsed while the film itself becomes a dynamic entity."

In 2024, Vidvastha (Devastated) had its world premiere at the International Film Festival Rotterdam, which is a film "that is not afraid to directly confront the increasingly authoritarian national trajectory while also paving the way for future generations of Indian filmmakers to think in terms of cinematic linguistics that do not conform to the derivative form that plagues contemporary Indian movies." In a review of the film in ArtReview Devastated is described as a: "commentarial film that examines the double life of a middle-aged Hindu policeman… through its complex and probing discourses, grittily examines the nature of violence in its diverse forms."

== Filmography ==
Year	Original title	International title	Language(s)	Notes
1997	Et cetera	Et cetera	English	
1999	Kalighaat Fetish	Kalighaat Fetish	Hindi	
2000	Performing Death	Performing Death	No spoken language	
2001	Rummaging for Pasts	Rummaging for Pasts: Excavating Sicily, Digging Bombay	English	film essay; partly based on Monte Polizzo excavations in Sicily
2002	Brihannala ki Khelkali	Dancing Othello	English	
2005	Antaral	End Note	Bengali	
2007	Nirakar Chhaya	Shadows Formless	English	debut feature; based on Malayalam novella Pandavapuram by Sethu
2010	Vakratunda Swaha	Vakratunda Swaha	Hindi	
2011	Katho Upanishad	Katho Upanishad	Hindi	based on the dialogue between Yama and Nachiketa, from the Katha Upanishad
2014	Rati Chakravyuh	Rati Chakravyuh	Bengali	
2015	Kalkimanthankatha	The Churning of Kali	Bengali	inspired by Waiting for Godot by Samuel Beckett
2017	Aapothkalin Trikalika	The Kali of Emergency	Bengali	
2018	Vrindavani Vairagya	Dispassionate Love	Bengali	
2021	Na Manush Premer Kothamala	Glossary of Non-Human Love	Bengali	
2024	Vidhvastha	Devastated	Bengali	
2026	Meghnadbadh Kavya	The Killing of Meghnad	Bengali	based on Meghnad Badh Kavya by Michael Madhusudan Dutt

== Academic career ==
In 2021, he wrote a book, Bureaucratic Archaeology: State, Science and Past in Postcolonial India, published by Cambridge University Press, dealing with the intersection of politics and archaeology in India. Uzma Z. Rizvi in the review of this book in Antiquity writes: "Avikunthak successfully argues that Archaeological Survey of India's bureaucracy, and the religious politics that inform the structures of those offices, run so deep in archaeological practice in India that it cannot but impact the very nature of the archaeological evidence that it produces and presents as scientific fact."

== Controversy ==
In July 2017, a social-media outrage erupted when Avikunthak was debarred from entering the upmarket Quest Mall in Kolkata because he was wearing a dhoti. He was eventually allowed after he spoke in English. In a Facebook post that went viral he wrote: "This is unambiguously a new low for this city. Private clubs have always created hierarchies and distinctions because of clothing. Now public spaces are also threatened and a culture of segregation based on class is being practiced unhindered. I write this with a sense of deep disgust."

== Personal life ==
He married twice; his second marriage is to Debleena Sen Chadha, an actress in Bengali-language films. He has a daughter.

== See also ==
- Amrit Gangar
- Amit Dutta
- Film and Television Institute of India
- MUBI
