= Char Adhyay (novel) =

1934 novel by Rabindranath Tagore

Char Adhyay is a political novel written in Bengali by Rabindranath Tagore. It was published in 1934. This is the last novel written by Rabindranath. The novel has a connection with the story of Rabindranath's "Rabibar".

After the non-cooperation movement in British India, a renewed violent revolutionary effort was started in Bengal. The story is written by criticizing barbaric terrorism. Indranath, the leader of the terrorists, is as superhuman as he is cruel on the one hand. The main story of the end of Atindra and Ella's love under his direction.

== Film adaptations ==
The following films are based on Rabindranath's novel Char Adhyay:

- Zalzala, 1952 Hindi film
- Char Adhyay, 1998 Hindi film
- Ellar Char Adhyay, 2012 Indian Bengali film
