= 16th Mumbai International Film Festival =

International film festival in India

- Official poster
- Location: Mumbai, Maharashtra, India
- Founded: 1990
- Hosted by: Films Division of India, Ministry of Information and Broadcasting, Government of India
- No. of films: 729 National and 144 International from 24 countries
- Festival date: Opening: 28 January 2020; Closing: 3 February 2020
- Language: International
- Website: miff.in

Mumbai International Film Festival
- 17th 15th

The 16th Mumbai International Film Festival (Mumbai International Film Festival) was held from 28 January to 3 February 2020.

The list included various kind of Documentaries, short fiction and animation films. The festival also celebrated the birth centenary of Satyajit Ray by showcasing documentaries made by him including short film Pikoo (1980), Sukumar Ray (1987) and The Inner Eye (1972). In addition the festival showcased Satyajit Ray, Filmmaker (1982), directed by Shyam Benegal, and Sagnik Chatterjee’s documentary Feluda: 50 Years of Ray's Detective (2019), which focuses on Ray’s popular Feluda stories.

== Jury ==
The Jury panel for MIFF 2020 included:

- Shaji N Karun, Indian film director and cinematographer
- Robert Cahen, American university professor, theatre director, playwright, and drama critic
- Hama Haruka, Indian film producer
- Amrit Gangar, Indian film scholar, historian, critic, curator and writer
- Rehina Pareira, producer, writer
- Thomas Waugh, Canadian critic, lecturer, author, actor and activist
- A. K. Bir, Indian film cinematographer, screenwriter and director
- Utpal Borpujari, Indian National Film Award winner as a film critic, and as a filmmaker
- Pencho Kunchev, Bulgarian art director, director (Animation Department)
- Kireet Khurana, Indian filmmaker, storyteller, and ad-film director

== Selection ==
=== International Competition ===
| Title | Director | Country | Duration |
Documentary
| Daughters of Scheherazade | Ranjini Krishnan | India | 19min |
| Karbala Katha | Sourav Sarangi | India | 40min |
| Moti Bagh | Nirmal Chander | India | 59min |
| My Home India | Anjali Bhushan | India | 45min |
| Pariah Dog | Jesse Alk | USA | 77min |
| Swimming through the Darkness | Supriyo Sen | India | 76min |
| The Outside In | Hansa Thapliyal | India | 26min |
| Babenco: Tell Me When I Die | Barbara Paz | Brazil | 75min |
| Blue Breath | Rodrigo Areias | Portugal | 78min |
| Echo from the Pukpui Skies | Joshy Joseph | India | 28min |
| Fiancees | Julia Banter | Switzerland | 80min |
| Glow Worm in a Jungle | Ramana Dumpala | India | 12min |
| Hasina: A Daughter's Tale | Piplu Khan | Bangladesh | 72min |
| Moving Sand | Floros Floridis Jeanine, Meerapfel | Germany | 47 min |
| Omarska | Varun Sasindran | France | 19min |
| Shot Awake: The Making of Changlangshu's New Logdrum | Anungla Zoe Longkumer | India | 26min |
| The Secret Life of Frogs | Ajay Bedi & Vijay Bedi | India | 54min |
| Voice of Siang | Joor Baruah | India | 57min |
| Wars Don't End | Dheeraj Akolka | Norway | 64min |
| And What is the Summer Saying? | Payal Kapadia | India | 20min |
Animated Documentary
| A Minor Genocide | Natalia Koryncka-Gruz | Poland | 72min |
Short Fiction
| From Durban to Tomorrow | Dylan Mohan Gray | India | 40min |
| An Essay of Rain | Nagraj Manjule | India | 26min |
| Brishti | Debashish Ghoshal | India | 20min |
| In the Month of Love | Shashank Walia | India | 31min |
| Wig | Atanu Mukherjee | India | 26min |
Animation
| Portrait of Suzanne | Izabela Plucinska | Germany | 15min |
| The Fox of the Palmgrove | Divakar S.K. | India | 9min |

=== National Competition ===
| Genre | Title | Director | Language | Duration |
|---|---|---|---|---|
| Documentary | Dwelling in Travelling | Subha Das Mollick | English | 69min |
| Documentary | Ladakh Chale Rikshawala | Indrani Chakraborty | Bengali | 26min |
| Documentary | Sindhustan | Sapna Bhavnani | English, Hindi, Sindhi | 64min |
| Documentary | The Motherland | Shibu Prusty | English, Odia | 61min |
| Documentary | At the Altar of India's Freedom - INA Veterans of Malaysia | Choodie Shivaram | English | 30min |
| Documenrary | Atasi | Putul Mahmood | Bengali | 52min |
| Documentary | Before it Vanishes | Biju Pankaj | Malayalam | 21min |
| Documentary | Elephants Do Remember | Swati Pandey, Viplove Rai Bhatia, Manohar Singh Bisht | English | 37min |
| Documentary | Son Rise | Vibha Bakshi | Hindi, English | 49min |
| Documentary | The 14th February & Beyond | Utpal Kalal | Hindi, English | 58min |
| Documentary | The Krishna Cosmic Circle of Life: | Maya Chandra | English | 25min |
| Documentary | Koothu | Sandhya Kumar | Tamil | 52min |
| Documentary | The Stork Saviours | Vijay Bedi, Ajay Bedi | English | 26min |
| Documentary | Waste Band | Supriyo Sen | English | 54min |
| Documentary | Aru Jan Boli | Swadesh Kumar Pathak, Mukesh Sharma | Hindi | 35min |
| Documentary | The Wounded Souls of the Rann | Dinesh Lakhanpal | English | 55min |
| Documentary | The Monks Who Won the Grammys | Aparna Sanyal | English | 53min |
| Documentary | Idiom of Rug | Dip Bhuyan | Hindi | 52min |
| Films on Climate Change | Babbling Rivers - A Gift of Human Labour, Love and Passion | Kailash Bhutani | Hindi | 15min |
| Films on Climate Change | The Wetland's Wail | Aravind M. | English | 4min |
| Short Fiction | 3 Star Split | Shib Ram Sharma | Bengali | 15min |
| Short Fiction | Aasiya | Mayaram | Silent | 26min |
| Short Fiction | Baitullah | Jitendra Rai | Hindi | 6.4min |
| Short Fiction | Bholi | Amitabh S Verma | Hindi | 13min |
| Short Fiction | Chaukhat (Door Frames) | Bibhanshu Rai | Bhoojpuri | 31min |
| Short Fiction | Dreams | Athithya Kanagarajan | Tamil | 10min |
| Short Fiction | Dying Wind In Her Hair | Shazia Iqbal | Hindi, Urdu | 20min |
| Short Fiction | Chaar Pandrah | Saif Baidya | Hindi | 22min |
| Short Fiction | Friends Forever | Navjot Bains | Hindi | 10min |
| Short Fiction | Shevanti | Nilesh Kunjir | Marathi | 8.3min |
| Short Fiction | Adi Sonal | Heena D'Souza | Hindi | 29min |
| Short Fiction | Naked Wall | Anant Dass Sahni | Hindi | 29min |
| Short Fiction | Mayyat | Suyash Shinde | Marathi | 26min |
| Short Fiction | Posharini | Sreecheta Da | Bengali | 27min |
| Short Fiction | Knock Knock | Subash Sahoo | Hindi, English | 25min |
| Short Fiction | Bishad Bindu | Samrat Chakraborty | Bengali | 23min |
| Short Fiction | Grandfather | Umashankar Nair, Gaiti Siddiqui | Nepalese | 10min |
| Short Fiction | Haze | Nainisha Dedhia | Gujarati | 19min |
| Short Fiction | Lacchavva | Jai Shankar | Kannada | 26min |
| Short Fiction | Plus Minus | Jyoti Kapur Das | Hindi | 18min |
| Short Fiction | A Turn | Kaushikkumar Kiranbhai G | Marathi | 13min |
| Animation | Amrita | Swati Agarwal | English | 6min |
| Animation | Bully | Aroop Dwivedi | Hindi | 6min |
| Animation | Koodedaan (Dustbin) | Danish Kelkar | Silent | 2.2min |
| Animation | Chakki | Jyotsna Puthran | Silent | 6min |
| Animation | Please | Naveen Kiran Boktapa | English | 3.6min |
| Animation | Now Your Home? | Prasad Pandurang Mahekar | Silent | 2min |

=== International Prism ===
| Genre | Title | Director | Country | Duration |
|---|---|---|---|---|
International Prism
| Short Fiction | A Dying Wish | Shubhra Dixit | India | 14min |
| Documentary | Education on the Boat - A new hope for tomorrow | KM Taj Biul Hasan | Bangladesh | 19min |
| Documentary | The Black Mother | Pawan Bargaje | India | 27min |
| Documentary | The Other Men In Blue | Tathagat Prakash & Navagat Prakash | India | 29min |
| Documentary | Wings of Desire | Pratibha Kaur Pasricha | India | 59min |
| Documentary | Warli Art: Endangered Heritage | Hemant Verma | India | 33min |
| Documentary | Saalumarada Thimmaka: The Green Crusader | P.Rajendran | India | 43min |
National Prism
| Short Fiction | Albelo Jaipur | Chandan Singh Shekhawa | India | 4.4min |
| Short Fiction | Bhaskar Calling | Sanjiv Kishinchandani | India | 24min |
| Short Fiction | Camellia | Sreelekha Mukherji | India | 17min |
| Documentary | Children Of the Soil | Ranadeep Bhattacharyya & Judhajit Bagchi | India | 4min |
| Short Fiction | Gurez | Shruti Anindita Varma, Amitabh S Verma | India | 8min |
| Short Fiction | Look at the Sky | Ashok Veilou | India | 30min |
| Short Fiction | Nine Plus One Is Equal To One | Rahul Yadav | India | 18min |
| Short Fiction | Sankalp | Mukesh Chandra | India | 5min |
| Short Fiction | Summer Rhapsody | Shravan Katikaneni | India | 20min |
| Documentary | Festival of Pagodas | Madhu Eravankara | India | 55min |
| Documentary | The Geshema is Born | Malati Rao | Tibetian | 56min |

=== Masterclass ===
16th edition of MIFF screened masterclasses by Michaël Dudok de Wit, Pencho Kunchev, Thomas Waugh, Mazhar Kamran, Ramesh Tekwani, Munjal Shroff, Chetan Sharma, etc.

== Awards ==
=== National Competition ===
Best Animation Film : MIXI (Jyotsna Puthran)

Best Short Fiction Film (up to 45mins.): Bebaak: Dying wind in her hair (Shazia Iqbal); Lacchavva (Jai Shankar) - Special Mention

Best Documentary film (below 60 minutes) : Atasi (Putul Mahmoodl); Son-Rise (Vibha Bakshi) - Special Mention

Best Documentary Film (above 60 minutes) : Sindhustan (Sapna Bhavnani)

Best Sound Design : Pariah Dog

Best Editing Film : The Saleswoman; Fiancees

Best Cinematography: Bebaak : Dying wind in her hair

Best Actor : Ritvik Sahore (To Remember Me By)

=== International Competition ===
Best Animation Film : Portrait of Suzanne (Izabela Plucinska); The Fox of the Palmgrove (Divakar SK)

Best Short Fiction Film (up to 45 mins.) : An Essay of Rain (Nagraj Manjule)

Best Documentary Film of the Festival (Golden Conch) : Babenco: Tell Me When I Die (Barbara Paz)

Pramod Pati Special Jury Award (For Most Innovative / Experimental Film) (For Director only) : And What is the Summer Saying (Payal Kapadia), Echo From The Pukpui Skies (Joshy Joseph)

IDPA Award for Best Student Film : Naked Wall (Anant Dass Sahni)

Dadasaheb Phalke Chitranagari Award for Best Debut Film of a Director (Govt of Maharashtra) : Grandfather (Umashankar Nair)

Special Award for Best Short film on Water conservatio & Climate Change (up to 15 mins.)(For Indian filmmakers only) : The Wetland's Wail (Aravind M)

Lifetime Achievement Award

- Dr. V. Shantaram Lifetime Achievement Award: S. Krishnaswamy
