= Zalzala (1952 film) =

- Directed by: Paul Zils
- Written by: Krishan Chander
- Based on: Char Adhyay by Rabindranath Tagore
- Starring: Geeta Bali; Dev Anand; Kishore Sahu; Krishnakant
- Music by: Pankaj Mullick
- Release date: 1952
- Country: India
- Language: Hindi

Zalzala is a 1952 Indian Hindi-language film directed by Paul Zils. The film is based on Rabindranath Tagore's 1934 novel Char Adhyay, and its script is written by Krishan Chander. The leading cast inlcudes Geeta Bali, Dev Anand, Kishore Sahu and Krishnakant. Pankaj Mullick composed the music for the film.

The production of Zalzala began in late August 1951. It was completed and released in 1952. A review by critic Baburao Patel of Filmindia described it as a "technically attractive" production. Another review in The Times of India stated that Zalzala possessed "thematic appeal" and "human interest".
