= Amrit Gangar =

Indian film scholar

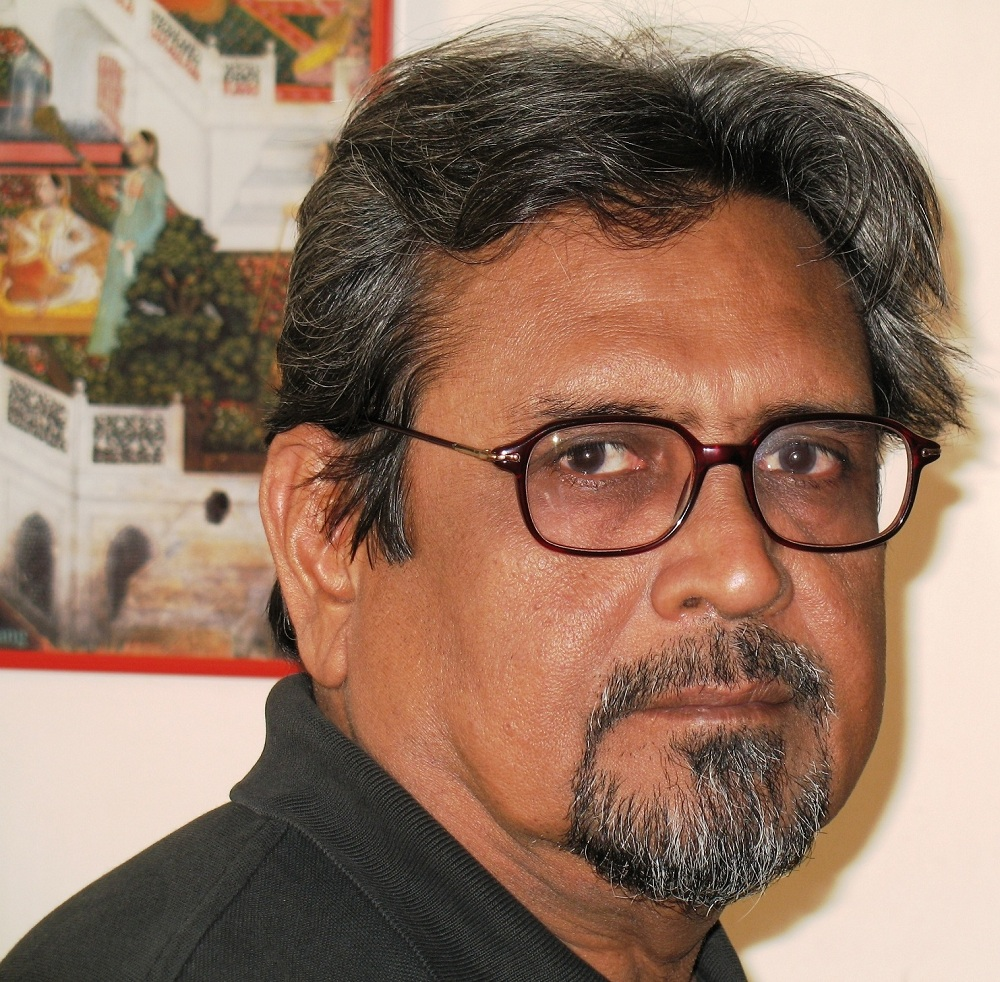
- Amrit Gangar
- Occupations: Film scholar, historian, critic, curator and writer
- Awards: 2007: University of Mumbai, a silver plaque for his contribution to the book Photobiography of the University of Mumbai. 2007: A trophy from Naval Dockyard Mumbai for discovering and preserving the documentary film India's Struggle for National Shipping. 2005: Taramati Visanji Award for contribution to art and culture. 2002: Cinematographers’ Combine honored him with a trophy (miniature Mitchel camera) for his writing and curatorial work for the cinema. 1989: The International Federation of Film Clubs honored him with a plaque in Germany for his persistent and imaginative work in the Indian film society movement.

Amrit Gangar is an Indian film scholar, historian, critic, curator and writer from Mumbai, Maharashtra, India.

He worked as consultant content developer for the National Museum of Indian Cinema set up by the National Council of Science Museums in Mumbai. He was actively involved with India’s film society movement and was secretary of Screen Unit, and Regional Secretary of Federation of Film Societies’ Western Region. Curator of Experimenta (first in Mumbai and now in Bangalore), Shai Heredia in an interview with Amrit Gangar, draws the history of Screen Unit and the film society movement in India over the years; he is credited to have been one of the pioneers in ushering in the serious film appreciation in Mumbai. He has also been holding film appreciation workshops all over Gujarat and at various educational and institutional spaces in India. Gangar has been working in the field of cinema in various capacities for over three decades.

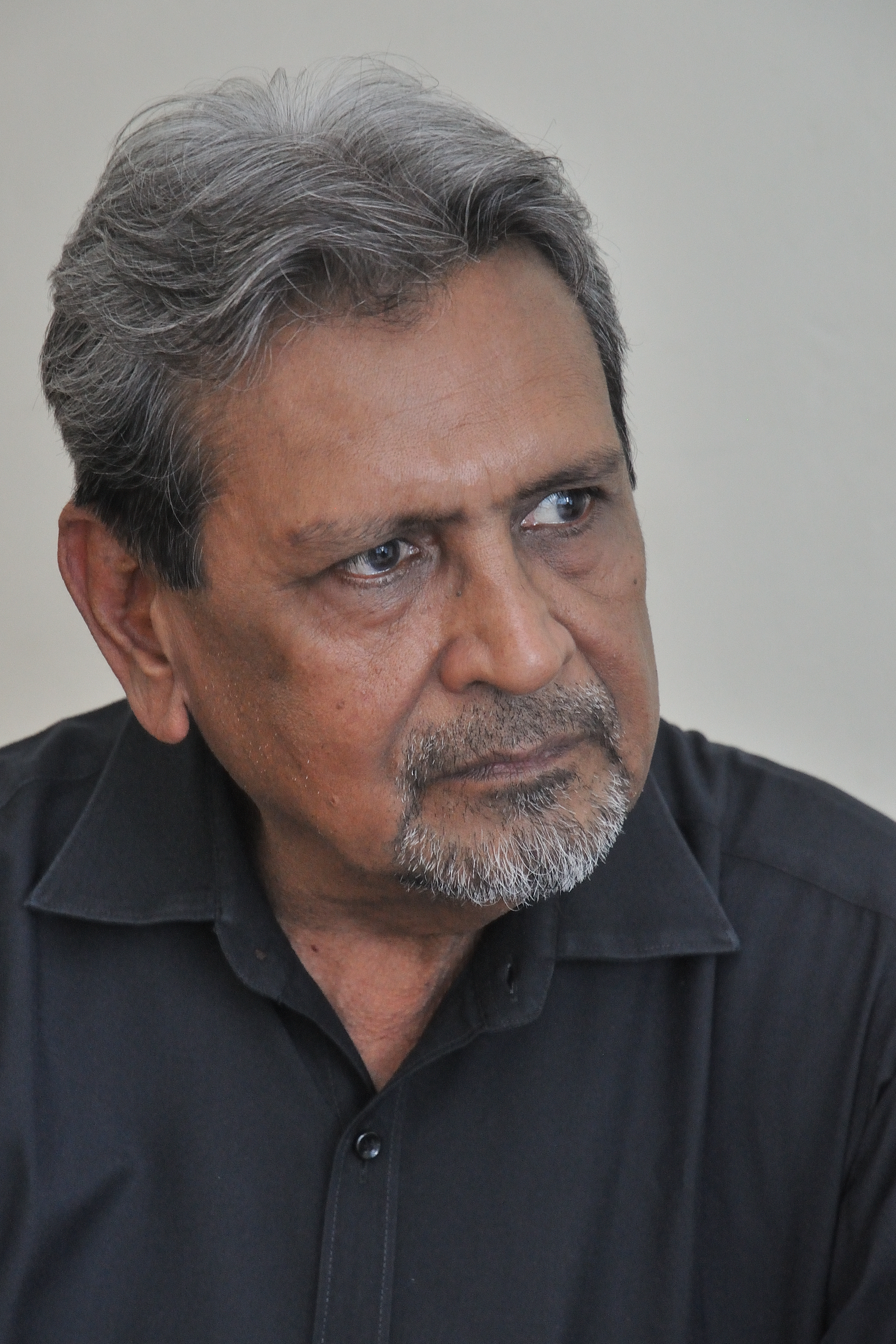
Gangar at Satyajit Ray Film and Television Institute in Kolkata, 2016.

He has been part of production and creative teams of numerous feature, documentary, short films and video installations by artists from Europe and Scandinavia. For the past several years, he has been engaged with his new theoretical-philosophical concept Cinema of Prayoga or Cinema Prayoga.

== Cinema of Prayoga: A New Concept ==
Amrit Gangar has been responsible for coining, developing and theorizing his new theoretical concept of 'Cinema of Prayoga' or 'Cinema Prayoga' that aims at substituting and expanding the generally accepted Euro-American-centric term the 'Experimental Film' while celebrating the cinematographic idiom deeply located in the polyphony of Indian philosophy and cultural imagination, including the perception of 'time' and 'space'. Since his first public presentation of 'Cinema of Prayoga' at the Experimenta, Mumbai in 2005, he has been presenting it at various venues and fora in India and abroad. Films by Amit Dutta, Ashish Avikunthak, Vipin Vijay, Kabir Mohanty and Arghya Basu fall within the ambit of this concept.

== Authorship: Books – English, and other Indian languages (Original or Tr.) ==
- Roopantar, adaptations from literature to cinema, Arunodaya Prakashan, Ahmedabad – in Gujarati, 2014.
- Walter Kaufmann: The Music that Still Rings at Dawn, Every Dawn, Goethe Institute, Mumbai, 2013.
- Cinema Vimarsh, Gujarat Sahitya Akademi, Gandhinagar – in Gujarati, 2012.
- Mumbai 24 x 7, essays on the city of Mumbai, Arunodaya Prakashan, Ahmedabad – in Gujarati, 2 011.
- Cinema. Culture. Capital. Context: India, Monfakira, Kolkata, 2010.
- Sohrab Modi: The Great Mughal of Historicals (in the series, the Legends of Indian Cinema), Wisdom Tree, New Delhi, 2008.
- Paul Zils and the Indian Documentary, Goethe Institute, Mumbai, 2003.
- Satyajit Ray Ani Tyanche Chitrapat (Marathi), Lokvangmaya Griha, Mumbai, 2002. (Tr. from original English)
- Franz Osten and the Bombay Talkies: A Journey from Munich to Malad, 2001, Goethe Institute, Mumbai.
- seven Parichay Pustika (Introductory Booklets), Parichay Trust, Mumbai - in Gujarati (2000-2013)
1. Bimal Roy
2. Sohrab Modi
3. Bharatiya Cinema ma Navo Juval (The New Wave in Indian Cinema)
4. Yadgar Dastaveji Chitro (Memorable Documentary Films)
5. Bharat na Uttam Balchitro (The Best of Indian Children’s Films)
6. Charlie Chaplin
7. Rashtriya Film Sangrahalaya (The National Film Archive of India)
8. National School of Drama
9. Bharatiya Cinema ni Shatabdi (100 Years of Indian Cinema)

== Editorship, Co-Editorship: Books – English, Gujarati, Danish (Tr.) ==
1. Art in India: A mighty river of the unique and the universal, ARTiT (Japan’s first bilingual art quarterly), special number on Indian contemporary art, co-ordination and co-editing with Johan Pijnappel, 2007.
2. Jainism: Walking into Eternity, Eds.Birthe Molhave, Amrit Gangar, Kuntal Gangar and Kristian Molhave (Danish), 2001, Systime, Aarhus, Denmark.
3. Indian Cinema: A Visual Voyage (with Virchand Dharamsey), 1998, Publication Division, New Delhi. (contd.)
4. Edited the National Film Development Corporation’s monthly bulletin, 1995.
5. The Rigour of Austerity: Robert Bresson and Luis Buñuel, 1989, Federation of Film Societies of India, Mumbai. Ed.
6. Andrei Tarkovsky: A Homage, 1987, Screen Unit, Mumbai. Ed.
7. Ritwik Ghatak: Arguments / Stories (with Ashish Rajadhyaksha), 1984, Screen Unit, Mumbai.
8. Also published Ritwik Ghatak: A Return to the Epic, the first major book in English on Ritwik Ghatak by Ashish Rajadhyaksha on behalf of Screen Unit, Bombay,1982
9. Gujarati Cinema: At 1982 (with Manilal Gala), Screen Unit, Mumbai.
10. Edited the main and retrospective catalogues of the Mumbai International Festival for Documentary, Short and Animation Films from

1990 uptil1998, as also of the Children’s Film Festival of India, and of the National Film Development Corporation.

== Part of Publications ==
1. Unveiling Desire: Fallen Women in Literature, Culture, and Films of the East, Eds. Devaleena Das and Colette Morrow, Rutgers – Forthcoming
2. The Unposted Letter, A collection of articles by and on Shri Goverdhan Panchal, an expert on Sanskrit Theatre, Architecture, Ed. Hasmukh Baradi, TMC, Ahmedabad, 2014.
3. Kalaveethi, Eds. Ajaysingh Chouhan, et al., Pranav Prakashan, Ahmedabad, 2013.
4. Ritwik Ghatak: A Return to the Epic, Ashish Rajadhyaksha, Screen Unit, Mumbai, 1982.
5. Essays, Poems contributed to Books, Catalogues and Journals: English, Gujarati, Kachchhi, Marathi, Bengali, Malayalam, Tamil, French, Spanish, Finnish, Danish, Norwegian, German, Swish, Swedish, Russian, Persian (Tr.) (Select)
6. Buddhadeb Dasgupta: Poet of Celluloid, Federation of Film Societies of India, Kolkata, 2014.
7. Routledge Handbook of Indian Cinema, Eds. K. Moti Gokulsing and Wimal Dissanayake, Routledge, London, 2013.
8. Moving Image Review & Art Journal (MIRAJ), London, Ed. Catherine Elwes, 2012.
9. Swarnim Gujaratno Swapnadrashta: Veer Narmad, Ed. Jagdish Gurjar, Veer Narmad South Gujarat University, Surat, 2011.
10. The Chawls of Mumbai: Galleries of Life, Ed. Neera Adarkar, imprint One, New Delhi, 2011.
11. Focus: Design & Informal Cities, Indian Architect and Builder, Mumbai, 2010.
12. Revisioning Mumbai: Conceiving a Manifesto for Sustainable Development, Eds. Vimal Shah, Pankaj Joshi, The Asiatic Society, Mumbai, 2010.
13. Asian Film Journeys, Eds. Rashmi Doraiswamy, Latika Padgaonkar, Wisdom Tree, New Delhi 2010.
14. the kernel is a fact, Kabir Mohanty, Gallery SKE, Bangalore, 2010.
15. Girls and Girlshood at Threshold of Youth & Gender, Ed. Vibhuti Patel, The Women Press, Delhi, 2009.
16. INDIA: Cine de autor, documental independiente y ideocreacion (1899-2008, La Casa Encendida, Madrid, 2008. (Spanish) .
17. Espace Croise 1994–2006, cahier # 2, Roubaix, France, 2008. (French)
18. Vishva na Yadgar Pravachano, Ed. Suresh Dalal, Mahesh Dave, Image Publications Pvt. Ltd., Mumbai, Ahmedabad, 2008. (Gujarati)
19. Masala: Bollywood – sa furnkar det, Ed.Katarina Przybtl, Ostasiatiska Museet, Stockholm, Sweden, 2008. (Swedish)
20. India Express: Sacred and Popular, Eds. Erja Pusa, et al., Helsinki City Art Museum, Helsinki, Finland. (Finnish, Swedish, English)
21. Song for an Ancient Land, Kabir Mohanty, Gallery SKE, Bangalore, 2006.
22. Bollywood in Switzerland, Ed. Alexandra Schneider, The Museum of Design, Zurich, Switzerland, 2005. (German)
23. The Best of Speaking Tree, Vols. 1 and 4, The Times of India, 2004, 2007.
24. Enduring Legacy: Parsis of the 20th Century (in 4 parts), Ed. Nawaz B. Mody, K.R. Cama Oriental Institute, Mumbai 2005.
25. The Best of Speaking Tree, Vol. 4, The Times of India, 2007.
26. Ardhi Sadi ni Vachanyatra, Ed. Mahendra Meghani, Lok Milap Trust, Bhavnagar, 2006. (Gujarati)
27. Film & Philosophy, Ed. K. Gopinathan, University of Calicut, 2003.
28. International Film, an Iranian Film Quarterly, Ed.Houshang Golmakani Tehran, Iran, 2001.
29. Frames of Mind: Reflections on Indian Cinema, Ed. Aruna Vasudev, ICCR, UBS, New Delhi, 1995.
30. Bombay: Mosaic of Modern Culture, Eds. Alice Thorner and Sujata Patel, OUP, 1995.
31. Bombay and Mumbai: The City in Transition, Eds. Sujata Patel and Jim Masselos, OUP, 2003.
32. Indomania, Ed. Dominique Paini, Cinematheque Francais, Paris, 1996.(French)
33. Figures, Facts, Feeling: A Direct Diasporic Dialogue, Parthiv Shah, 2000.
34. Images of India in European Cinema, Goethe Institute, Mumbai, 2000. (long essay)
35. Germany in Upheaval: A Series of Documentary Films, Goethe Institute, Mumbai, 1999 (long essay)
36. DEFA: Documentary Films, Goethe Institute, Mumbai, 1998. (long essay).
37. Voices of Emergency: An All India Anthology of Protest Poetry of the 1975-77 Emergency, Ed. John Oliver Perry, Popular Prakashan, Bombay, 1983.
38. Essays and poems published in numerous other catalogues, journals and dailies (English, Gujarati, Malayalam, etc.) including the Cinemaya, Osian’s Cinemaya, Art India, Lensight, the journal of the Film & Television Institute of India, Danish Film Institute Journal, Farbas Trimasik, Etad, Tathapi, Pratyaksha, Sameepe, Mumbai Samachar, Janmabhoomi Pravasi, Nav Gujarat Times, etc.

== Conceptualization and Curatorship of Programs (Select): India and Abroad ==
1. Cinema of Prayoga, Kochi-Muziris Biennale, 2014
2. Film Programs, Tapi Festival, Surat, India, 2014.
3. Kshaya of Akasa is also the Kshyaya of Chetana: Some Reflections on the shrinking of Sky in Cinema, Pondicherry, 2016.
4. Cinema of Prayoga, Danish Film Institute, Copenhagen: Indian Film Program, March 2012 .
5. Tribute to Mani Kaul, 12th Osian’s Cine-Fan Film Festival, 2012, New Delhi. For the first time the practitioners (camerapersons, soundpersons, editors and production persons) came together to discuss aesthetics and the philosophy of Mani Kaul’s cinematography.
6. Hosted and curated (along with Neville Tuli) Deewar: Celebrating 100 Years of Cinematic Heritage of India, 12th Osian’s Cine-Fan Film Festival, 2012, New Delhi.
7. Cinema of Prayoga, Conference at the Viswabharati University, Santiniketan, 2011.
8. Chelsea College of Art & Design, University of the Arts London, Moving Image Art and Global Media Spectacle, June 2011.
9. Centre Pompidou, Paris: Indian Experimental Films, June 2011.
10. Saat Sarjak. Saat Samvad (Seven Creators. Seven Dialogues), a seven-month-long (monthly) program on Cinema of Prayoga, National Centre for the Performing Arts (NCPA), Mumbai, 2008.
11. National Centre for the Performing Arts, Mumbai: Short Films about Sufism (2006).
12. Arts Reverie, Ahmedabad: Fana’a, 2007 – Sufi Soul: A Bouquet of International Short Films; Sufi Films, Ahmedabad Art Festival, 2012 (shown at the National Institute of Design).
13. Katha Centre for Film Studies, Mumbai: Curatorial Workshops-numerous.
14. Katha Centre for Film Studies, Mumbai: Chalchitra Chawlchitra: Conceived and curated a program of films around Mumbai’s chawls.
15. Bollywood Film Posters: Worked with the Norwegian Film Institute, Oslo, Norway in putting together hand painted billboards and writing a lead article for its exhibition, continuing from August 2007.
16. INDIA: Bollywood and Living Gods: Worked with the Museum of Far Eastern Antiquities, Stockholm, Sweden in putting together visual material pertaining to popular Hindi cinema within the exhibition (September 2007 – March 2008) concept.
17. Cinema of Prayoga (the term he coined to substitute the Anglo-American Experimental or Avantgarde Film.) Tate Modern, London presented this program along with a seminar in which he also spoke, 2006.
18. Devi Diva - Images of woman in Indian cinema, a short compilation of film excerpts, with Berenice Ellena, during an exhibition at Musee des Arts Asiatiques, Nice, France, 2006.
19. Kali: A program of Indian cutting edge short films about Kali presented at Gallery Espace Croise, Roubaix, France. It was part of the bigger event about Mumbai / India in Lille, France, 2007.
20. India Express: Presented an Indian film program in aesthetical context at the exhibition of Indian popular art at the Helsinki City Art Museum, Finland. Also helped organize a workshop by the Bollywood billboard painters during the exhibition.
21. Bollywood in Switzerland: Presented a film program in historical context and helped the exhibition organized by the Museum of Design in Zurich, Switzerland, 2001.
22. Dogma film program for the International Film Festival of Kerala in Trivandrum, Kerala.
23. Experimenta 2005: First time presented his new theoretical concept of Cinema of Prayoga, at this first of its kind cutting edge film festival in Mumbai.
24. Kala Ghoda Artfest: Curated film programs continuously for four years until 1998. Was commissioning editor for several short films on Kala Ghoda area made by different professional and amateur filmmakers, Mumbai, 1999.
25. Mumbai International Film Festival of Documentary, Short & Animation Films (MIFF). Curated retrospective programs from 1990 until 1996.
26. Curatorial Advisor, National Curatorial Program initiated by the India Foundation for the Arts and the Katha Centre for Film Studies, Mumbai.
27. 125th Birth Anniversary of Charlie Chaplin and the Chaplin Town, Adipur, Kachchh, 2014.
28. Five Devdas Films and One Novella, National Book Fair, Ahmedabad, 2014.
29. Indian Cinema: One Hundred Years of Fortitude, Hyderabad Literary Festival, 2014.
30. Indian Cinema: One Hundred Years of Fortitude, Whistling Woods International Film School, Mumbai, 2013.
31. Indian Cinema: One Hundred Years of Fortitude, as part of the Key-Note Address, International Seminar on Cinema, St. Xavier's College, Mumbai, 2013.
32. Cinematographic Symbiosis: Germany and India, Excellence on Tour, DWIH, Kolkata, 2014, Ahmedabad 2013, Mumbai 2013.
33. Cinematographic Symbiosis: Germany and India, Indo-German Chamber of Commerce, Mumbai 2013.
34. Cinematographic Symbiosis: Germany and India, Max Mueller Bhavan, Mumbai, 2013.
35. Cinema of Prayoga: Contemplating a Cinematographic Moment, York University, Toronto, Canada, 2013.
36. Cinema of Prayoga, No Cultural Boundaries, York University and SAVAC, Toronto, Canada, 2013.
37. The Moving Image Looped to be Mukt! – the Cinema of Prayoga conscience, the University of the Arts, London, 2011.

== Film Workshops in India and Elsewhere ==
- Over the years, conducted film appreciation and film and literature related workshops in Surat, Palanpur, Bharuch, Ahmedabad, Gandhinagar, Sadra, Bombay and other places.
- Several other such workshops are underway. National seminar ‘Roopantar’ (Literature to Cinema) organized in Nadiad was the outcome of the ‘Roopantar’ series in the journal Pratyaksha. Delivered the key-note address at the Nadiad conference. Was invited to Asmita Parva-14 (14 – 18 April 2011) at Mahua by Morari Bapu to present a talk on film kala nu anubhavan with reference to cinematographic experience. The program was televised internationally on Astha channel.

Conducted several Indian film workshops in different gymnasiums (schools) and institutions in Denmark.

== Program Consultant ==
- Goethe Institute, Max Mueller Bhavan, Mumbai.
- Cultural Centre of Russia, Mumbai.
- 2012: One of the active members of the organizing group on ‘Classic Incantations: The German Film Orchestra Babelsberg performs A.R. Rahman,’ a massive musical that showcased over a hundred orchestral musicians from the German Film Orchestra Babelsberg and KM Music Conservatory, Chennai and travelled across five Indian metros. It was exclusively presented by Lapp Group; conceived and coordinated by Goethe Institute, Mumbai.

== Awards ==
- 2007: A trophy from Naval Dockyard Mumbai for discovering and preserving the documentary film “India’s Struggle for National Shipping.”

== Film Festival Juries and Committees ==
Nomination on several film festival juries and selection committees in India and abroad. Select list:

- 2020 Jury member, 16th Mumbai International Film Festival
- 2017 Chairperson, SiGNS Film Festival, Kochi, Kerala.
- 2017 Selection, International Cinema, IFFK, Trivandrum, Kerala
- 2017 Member, National, Indian Documentary Producers’ Association.
- 2014: Cinema Verite, Tehran, Iran.
- 2010: Chairperson, Int. Jury of the International Film Festival of Ahmedabad.
- 2009: Member, International Jury, Oberhausen Short Film Festival, Germany.
- 2008: Member National Jury, Indian Documentary Producers’ Association.
- 2007: Member, Indian Documentary Producers’ Association, National Jury.
- 2007: Member, International Jury, International Short Film Fest, Tehran, Iran.
- 2006: Chairperson, Int. Jury, International Short Film Fest, Tehran, Iran.
- 2005: Member, Indian Documentary Producers’ Association, National Jury.
- 2005: Member, International Jury, Three-Continent Film Festival
- 2008: Member, Advisory Committee, NCPA, Mumbai.
- 1990-1995: Various national committees of the Mumbai International Film Festival for Documentary, Short & Animation Films.
- 1989: Member, National Short Film Jury, National Film Festival, India.

== Academic - Lectures / Conferences ==
- John Abraham Memorial Lecture, SiGNS Film Festival, Kochi, Kerala.
- Cinema of Prayoga: The Rigour of Austerity, Junoon, Kitabkhana, Mumbai.
- Students’ Centre, Zagreb, Croatia – Cinema of Prayoga and Indian Experimental Films.
- Royal College of Art, Copenhagen, Denmark; Yale University, New Haven, USA; Columbia University, New York, USA.
- Shri Rajmohan Gandhi’s Asia Plateau, Panchgani, Maharashtra – lectured on Indian cinema to students from various North American universities.
- Asmita Parva – 14, Mahua, Gujarat, a presentation on anubhāvan of cinema.
- Goethe Institute (Max Mueller Bhavan), Mumbai.
- University of the Arts London, June 2011.

Georges Pompidou Centre, Paris, June 2011 Kalabhavana, Santiniketan, August 2011.

- Several conferences and seminars in India and abroad, including in Australia, Sri Lanka, Iran, etc.

== Archiving / Databasing ==
- Was responsible for discovering and restoring the historic and rare documentary India’s Struggle for National Shipping by Paul Zils
- Conceived, developed and set up a comprehensive easy-to-retrieve database of the Films Division’s library of documentary films, etc. from 1948 to 1993, about 9000 documentary, short and animation films (with Subhash Chheda).
