= Premendra Mazumder =

Indian film critic

- Occupations: film -author, -curator, -society-activist, and -festival-consultant.
- Years active: 1977 – present

Premendra Mazumder is a film critic, author, curator, consultant, society activist, festival-organizer, and festival-consultant. He has participated in several round-table discussions, conducted workshops, delivered lectures, and presented papers on various topics at national and international conferences.

At the Kathmandu International Mountain Film Festival in 2015, he spoke on the 'Politics of Film and Social Dynamics' and on 'Trends in South Asian Independent Cinema'

He has conducted film workshops in Kabul, Afghanistan and Dushanbe, Tajikistan in 2019

He worked for the International Critics' Week Cannes (since 2006), Cairo International Film Critics Week (since its inception) and several other film festivals as consultant and advisor.

He presented the Celebration Ceremony of 100 Years of Indian Cinema in Croatia (May 2013).

He has inaugurated various film societies, and has been the chief guest at important film meets over the last decade. Additionally, he initiated the 1st FFSI International Film Festival traveling in over 40 cities in India. The Festival was inaugurated on 3 August 2015 in Kolkata.

== Writings on cinema ==
Premendra Mazumder's thoughts on cinema have been published in a variety of serious Indian film magazines; daily newspapers; and film journals - Screen, Rupwani, and DNA (Mumbai), Cinemaya (Delhi), Filmbuff, College Street, Chitrabhavna, and Chitralipi (Kolkata), Deep Focus (Bangalore). The international film magazines in which his writings have appeared include Positif, Subversive Cinema (Portugal), Film Realm (Cairo), Cinesith (Colombo), 16mm (Dhaka), and Deepwani (Port Blair). He is also the Indian correspondent of the Cannes Critics Week.

- Editorial Board - Dictionnaire du cinéma asiatique published in October 2008 by the Nouveau Monde Editions
- Editor - The Poet of Celluloid on the life and works of the master film maker Buddhadeb Dasgupta
- Executive-editor/co-author - 'Indian Film Culture' (2010)
- Executive-editor/co-author - 'Indian Film Culture: Indian Cinema' (2016)
- Co-author - Routledge Handbook of Indian Cinemas (chapter titled, 'Music in Mainstream Indian Cinema')
- Author - Film Society Movement: a Success or Failure?
- Author - Folk Songs of Bengal

== Publications ==
He writes essays, short stories, and plays. His published books are:

- Prekshapat (Collection of Essays, 1984)
- Hundred Years of Indian Cinema (1996)
- Samay Ashamayer Natak (Collection of Plays, 2005)
- Victoriar Pori Ebong Onyanya Galpo (Anthology of Short Stories, 2020) ISBN 978-93-81686-78-2

As a playwright he has five major plays to his credit.

== Offices hold ==
- Vice President - Federation of Film Societies of India
- General Secretary - Fipresci-India, India Chapter of the International Federation of Film Critics
- Secretary - Asia Pacific, International Federation of Film Societies (IFFS)
- Program Director Third Eye Asian Film Festival
- Festival Coordinator South Asian Short Film Festival
- Chairman Kalinga Global Film Festival
- Advisor Nepal International Film Festival
- Editor ECineIndia
- Chairman Bengal International Short Film Festival
- Festival Director Thrissur International Film Festival

== Jury member (incomplete) ==
- Jeevika Livelihood Documentary Competition (India, 2004)
- Mumbai International Film Festival (MAMI, Mumbai, India 2005)
- Mumbai International Film Festival for Shorts Documentaries & Animations (MIFF; 2006)
- Kara Film Festival (Karachi, 2006)
- Hyderabad International Film Festival (India, 2008)
- Ismailia International Festival for Documentary & Short Films (Egypt, 2008)
- Jeevika Asian Livelihood Documentary Competition (New Delhi, 2010)
- Short & Documentary Film Festival Hyderabad (2010)
- Shaken's Stars International Film Festival Almaty(Kazakhstan, 2012)
- Abu Dhabi Film Festival UAE (Abu Dhabi, 2012)
- Evora International Film Festival for Shorts & Documentaries FIKE (Portugal, 2013)
- Kathmandu International Mountain Film Festival
- Regard: Saguenay International Short Film Festival (Canada, 2016)
- Cairo International Film Festival (Cairo, Egypt 2016)
- SiGNS Film Festival (Cochi, India, 2016)
- Jaffna International Cinema Festival (Jaffna, Sri Lanka, 2017)
- Busan International Film Festival (Bushan, South Korea, 2017)
- Bengaluru International Film Festival (Bangalore, India, 2018)
- Ismailia International Film Festival (Ismailia, Egypt, 2018)
- Slemani International Film Festival (Slemania, Kurdistan, Iraq, 2018)
- Third Eye Asian Film Festival (Mumbai, India, 2018)
- Nepal International Film Festival (Kathmandu, 2019)
- International Film Festival of Kerala (Trivandrum, India, 2019)
- Kalinga Global Film Festival (Bhubaneshwar, India, 2020)
- Aurangabad International Film Festival (Aurangabad, India, 2020)
- International Film Festival of Thrissur (Thrissur, India, 2020)
- Ottawa Indian Film Festival (Ottawa, Canada, 2021)
- Siliguri International Short Film Festival (Siliguri, India, 2021)
- Auroville Film Festival (Auroville, Pondicherry, 2022)
