= Death of Merit =

Indian documentary series

The Death of Merit is a four-part documentary series. The first three parts were created by the Insight Foundation, a Dalit-Adivasi student group. The fourth was posted by Round Table India. The whole series has been edited by Gurinder Azad and team. The documentary series focuses on caste-based discrimination in the Indian higher education system and the suicides of Dalit students in Indian campuses. The Wire, states that the "Death of Merit, remains one of the most crucial documentations of forms of discrimination faced by Bahujan students in university spaces."

The videos are available on YouTube.

== Synopsis ==
Each part focuses on a specific student who committed suicide and are based on the testimonies of their parents and family members. These interviewees posit that the suicides were a result of caste-based hostility and harassment Dalit and Adivasi students have had to suffer from the faculties, fellow students, and administration in some of the country's premier educational institutions.

=== Balmukund Bharti ===
The first part of the documentary focuses on Dr. Balmukund Bharti, a final year MBBS student from All India Institute of Medical Sciences, New Delhi, who committed suicide on 3 March 2010. This was published in two parts on 24 April 2011 on the group's blog and documents the testimonies of parents and family members.

=== Jaspreet Singh ===
Part two, entitled Dr. Jaspreet Singh: The Death of Merit – Another Documentary, documents the testimonies of parents and family members of Dr. Jaspreet Singh, a final year MBBS student from Government Medical College and Hospital, Chandigarh, who committed suicide on 27 January 2008.

=== Manish Kumar Guddolian ===
The third in the series is titled The Death of Merit: Manish Kumar (IIT Roorkee) documents testimonies of parents and family members of Manish Kumar Guddolian, a second year student who was graduating from the Department of Computer Science & Information Technology, at Indian Institute of Technology (IIT) Roorkee, who committed suicide by jumping from the fifth floor of his hostel on 6 February 2011. This was released in two parts.

=== Ajay Sree Chandra ===
The fourth part in the series, The Death of Merit: Dr. V. Ajay Sree Chandra [A Documentary Film], focuses on Dr. Ajay Sree Chandra. Chandra committed suicide by hanging on 27 August 2007 in one of the hostel rooms in IIScl.
