= Amudhan R P =

Indian filmmaker

Pushpam Ramalingam Amudhan
- புஷ்பம் ராமலிங்கம் அமுதன்
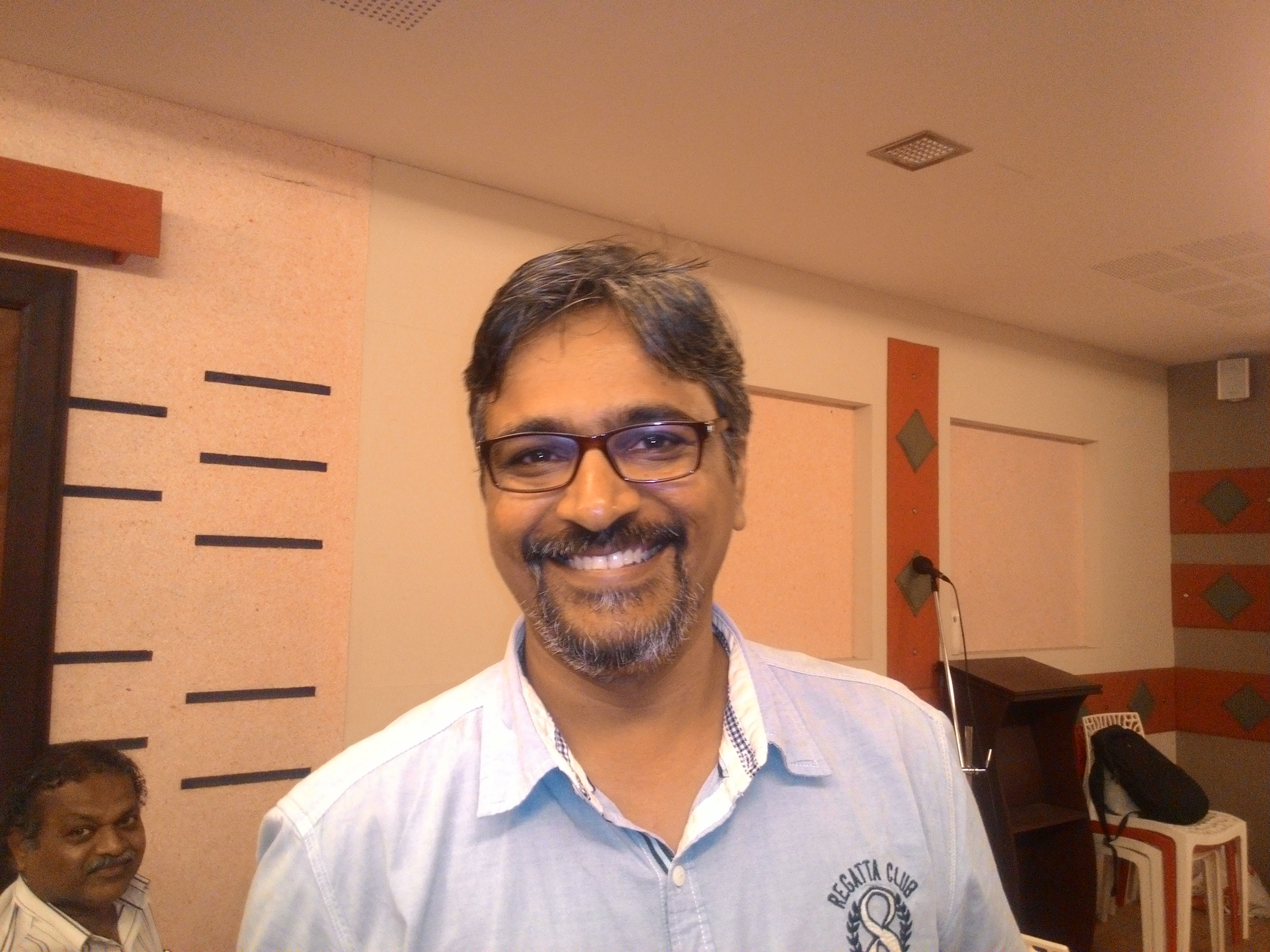
- Amudhan in September 2016 or earlier
- Born: 16 July 1971 (age 55); Palaiyurpatty, Madurai district, Tamil Nadu, India
- Occupations: Documentary filmmaker, Media activist
- Years active: 1994–present
- Website: https://amudhanrp.blogspot.com/

Puṣhpam Rāmaliŋkam Amudhaņ (Tamil: புஷ்பம் ராமலிங்கம் அமுதன்; born 16 July 1971), popularly known as Amudhan R.P., is a documentary film maker and media activist from Tamil Nadu, India.

== Early life ==
He was born on 16 July 1971 in Palaiyurpatty, a village near Melur in Madurai district, Tamil Nadu.

== Career ==
Along with local youth, he founded Marupakkam, a media activism group that is involved with making documentaries, organising regular screenings, film festivals and media workshops in and around Madurai. He has been making documentaries since 1997. His prominent films include two trilogies on caste and nuclear radiation. 'Shit' has won the best film award at the One Billion Eyes film festival in 2005 and the National Jury Award at the MIFF 2006.

Amudhan R.P. founded Madurai International Documentary and Short Film Festival in 1998 and has been organising the festival since then.

== Filmography ==
Year	Title	Notes
1996	Leelavathi	Documentary
1997	Theeviravaghigal (Terrorists)	Documentary
2001	Thodarum Thisavazhi	Documentary short
2002	Kaviri Padugai (Cauvery Delta)	Documentary short
2003	Pee (Shit)	Documentary short
2005	Mayana Kurippugal (Notes from the Crematorium)	Documentary short
2005	Vandhe Mataram - a shit version	Music Video
2005	Senthamil Nadenum Pothinile	Music Video
2006	Seruppu (Footwear)	Feature-length documentary
2008	The Road	Documentary short
2008	Night Life	Documentary short
2008	Radiation Stories Part 01 : Manavalakurichi	Documentary
2008	Radiation Stories Part 02: Kalpakkam	Documentary
2009	Broken Voices	Documentary
2009	Radiation Stories Part 03: Koodankulam	Feature-length documentary
2010	Thodarum Neethi Kolaihalm	Feature-length documentary
2011	Mercury in the Mist	Documentary
2012	Hey Mr.Gandhii, Leave the Indians Alone!	Documentary
2015	Dollar City	Feature-length documentary
2019	My Caste	Feature - length documentary

== Awards and honors (partial list) ==
Year	Award	Event	Organisation	Notes
2005	Best Film Award	One Billion Eyes film festival	Prakriti Foundation	
2006	National Jury Award	9th Mumbai International Film Festival	Films Division of India, Ministry of Information and Broadcasting, Government of India	
