= SS Jalabala (1927) =

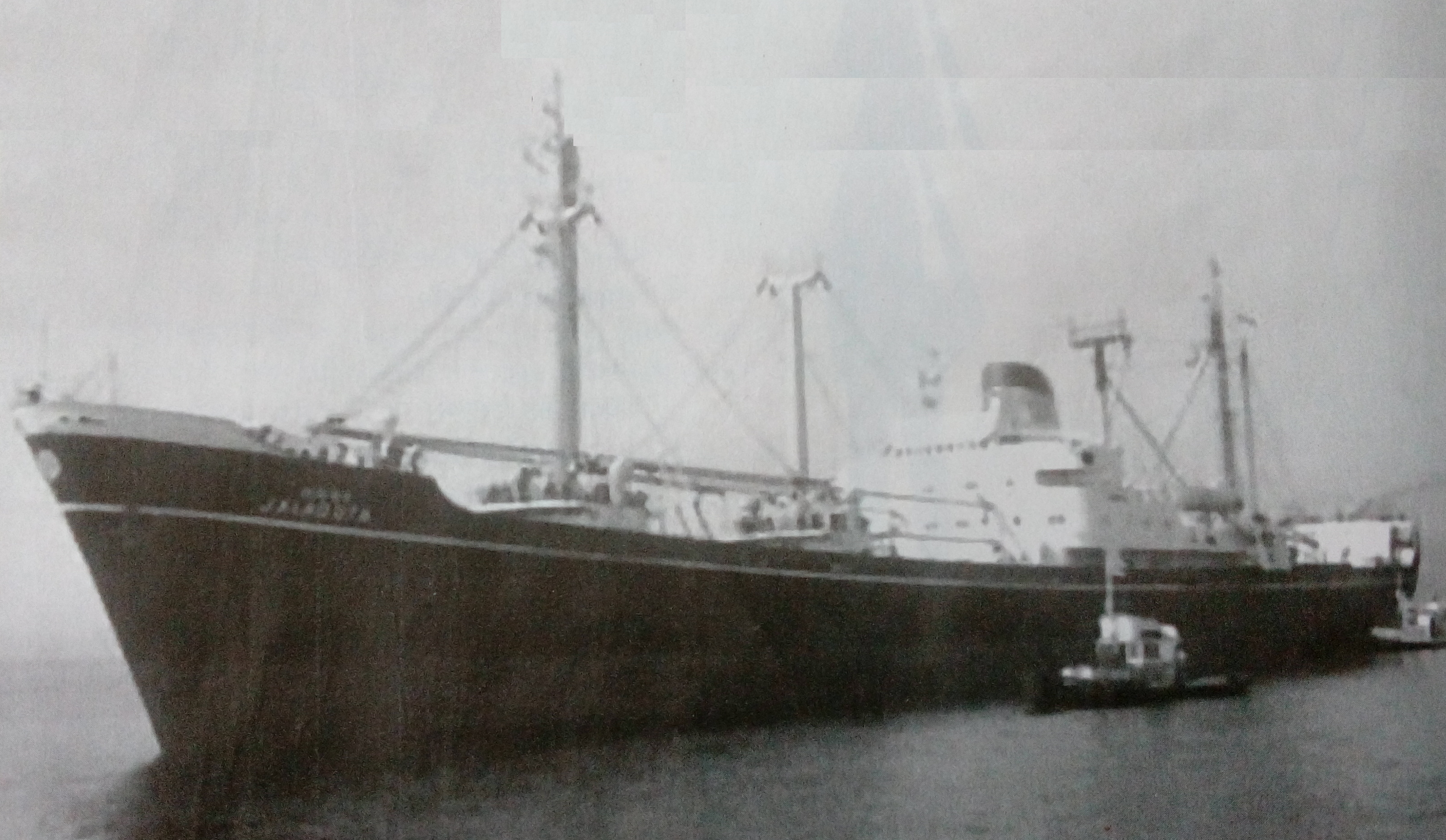
- Still of Jalabala from film, India's Struggle for National Shipping

History

British India
- Name: SS Jalabala
- Owner: Scindia Steam Navigation Company Ltd.
- Port of registry: Bombay
- Route: Colombo – Bombay – Karachi
- Builder: Lithgows, Glasgow
- Yard number: 801 (Kingston SB Yard)
- Launched: January 1927
- Christened: 14 July 1927
- Completed: 12 August 1927
- Identification: Official number 153807
- Fate: Torpedoed and sunk on 11 October 1943

General characteristics
- Type: Cargo general (Steel Screw Steamer)
- Tonnage: 3,610 GRT, 2,211 NRT, 3345 tons under deck
- Length: 349.9 ft (106.65 m)
- Beam: 49.0 ft (14.94 m)
- Depth: 24.3 ft (7.41 m)
- Installed power: 398 hp
- Propulsion: Steam
- Speed: 10 knots
- Crew: 74
- Notes: as per Lloyd's Register of Shipping

SS Jalabala was the cargo steamship owned by Scindia Steam Navigation Company Ltd., the British Indian shipping company, which was completed in 1927. She was torpedoed and sunk in the Laccadive Sea west of Cape Comorin by the German submarine U-532 with the loss of five of her 77 crew members on 11 October 1943 during World War II.

== Design ==
She was built by Lithgows Ltd., Glasgow in eight months in 1927. She was made of steel sheathed with copper and had two decks. She was lighted by electricity. She had cellular construction of double bottom which was 207 feet long and capacity of 850 tons. Its forepeak was of 85 tons while afterpeak was of 30 tons. Her register tonnage were 3,610 GRT, 2,211 NRT, 3345 tons under deck. Her triple expansion steam engine with single shaft and one screw had 3 cylinders with 24" and 40" diameter and had stroke of 65" and 45" generating 398 nominal horsepower. These engines were built by J. G. Kincaid & Co. Ltd., Greenock. She was owned by the Scindia Steam Navigation Company Ltd., Bombay and was registered in port of Bombay. She was 304.9 feet long, 49.0 feet broad and 24.3 feet deep.

== Career and fate ==
Vithalbhai Patel, then the speaker of the Central Legislative Assembly of British India, performed her ceremonial ship launching in Glasgow on 14 July 1927. The footage of launching was later presented in documentary film India's Struggle for National Shipping (1947). The ship was completed on 12 August 1927.

Mahatma Gandhi had written his concerns in Young India on its launch,

The ceremony ... does not evoke any feeling of national pride or rejoicing. It only serves as a reminder of our fallen state. What is the addition of one little ship to our microscopic fleet? The sadness of the reminder is heightened by the fact that our mercantile fleet may at any moment be turned into a fleet warring against our own liberty or against that of nations with which India has no quarrel...

— Mahatma Gandhi, Young India, 4 August 1927

The ship was used to transport cargo between Karachi, Bombay and Colombo. The ship left from Colombo to Bombay in convoy of nine ships (MB-50) in four columns on 9 October 1943. It had 2000 tons of copra and 1800 tons of general cargo. The convoy was escorted by a minesweeper HMIS Carnatic and an armed trawler HMIS Baroda. She had the crew of 74 with three gunners and led by Master James George Connor. She was armed with one 3-inch gun and four machine guns. On 11 October, the weather was fine and it was moving at 8 knots. At 16:30 hours, Jalbala was torpedoed by the German submarine U-532 when she was in station #11 of convoy. It was hit on the port side abreast bridge and second hatch. She sent distress signals and the crew soon abandoned the ship in the lifeboats. After being hit, she started to settle by the head after 10 minutes and sank by the bow after 25 minutes. It sank in the Laccadive Sea west of Cape Comorin (11°40′N 75°19′E). HMIS Carnatic dropped depth charges in a counterattack. As she was the only escort, she soon joined the convoy again without picking up survivors due to fear of repeat attack. The master was last to leave the ship but four crew members were lost. The lifeboats with 66 survivors landed on the nearby coast and were taken to Calicut the next day. The chief officer had died two hours before landing of boats. The master had joined six members on a raft which landed later and they were taken to Mangalore on 15 October.
