= Sumati Morarjee =

Indian businesswoman (1909–1998)

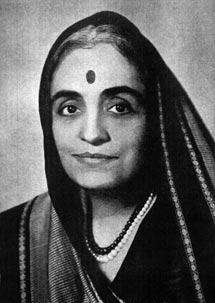
- Born: Jamuna; 13 March 1909; Bombay, British India
- Died: 27 June 1998 (aged 89); Mumbai, India
- Known for: Scindia Steam Navigation Company
- Spouse: Shanti Kumar Narottam Morarjee
- Awards: Padma Vibhushan (1971)

Sumati Morarjee (13 March 1909 – 27 June 1998), also known as the first woman of Indian shipping, is credited to have become the first woman in the world to head an organisation of ship owners, the Indian National Steamship Owners Association (later renamed Indian National Shipowners Association) which has been traditionally a male bastion. She has been awarded the Padma Vibhushan, the second highest civilian honor of India in 1971 for her civil services.

== Biography ==
Morarjee was born to the wealthy family of Mathuradas Goculdas and his wife, Premabai, in Bombay. She was named Jamuna, after the sacred river associated with Krishna in Vrindavan. According to then contemporary customs in India, while still a young girl she was married to Shanti Kumar Narottam Morarjee, the only son of Narottam Morarjee, founder of Scindia Steam Navigation Company, which later grew to be India's largest shipping firm.

=== Influence of Mahatma Gandhi ===
Morarjee remained in regular touch with Mahatma Gandhi and both met on several occasions. Their exchange was documented in newspaper reports. She counted him among her closest friends. Between 1942 and 1946, she was involved in the underground movement for Independence with him, facilitating the transport of Sindhis from Pakistan to India during the partition unrest. She also provided for the passage of A. C. Bhaktivedanta Swami Prabhupada, founder Acharya of the International Society for Krishna Consciousness (ISKCON), to USA in 1965.

== Scindia Steam Navigation Company ==
Morarjee was included in the managing agency of the company in 1923 at age 14. She built the company from humble beginnings parlaying a few vessels in the company and gradually developing it, till she assumed full charge of the company by 1946, managing over six thousand people. She was already on the board of directors, and her expertise in the shipping trade, developed over many years. Subsequently, she was elected the president of Indian National Steamship Owners' Association in 1956, 1957, and 1965. It was under her supervision that the company rose to fleet of 43 shipping vessels totalling 552,000 tonnes of dead weight. She was also the chairperson of the Narottam Morarjee Institute of Shipping and was elected as vice-president of the World Shipping Federation, London, in 1970.

From 1979 to 1987, she was chairperson of the company, until the government took over the debt-ridden Scindia Steam Navigation. She was later appointed as the chairperson emeritus of the company till 1992.

== Death ==
She died due to cardiac arrest on 27 June 1998 at the age of 89.

It is not purely for business motives that we today concentrate on shipping. We want our people to travel abroad and the foreigners to see our ancient land. It has been the Indian tradition to export the best to foreign countries. We did business in merchandise for centuries, but our most precious cargo has been ideas of universal brotherhood and deep spirituality. . . . Our tradition of such transcendent goodwill to all has continued throughout.

— Sumati Morarjee
