= Shanti Kumar Morarjee =

Shanti Kumar Morarjee (1902 – 1982) was a noted industrialist, businessman and close associate of Mahatma Gandhi.

He was son of Narottam Morarjee, the mill owner and shipping magnate of India. He was educated at Harrow School. He was on the board of SS Loyalty, on its maiden voyage to London with his father, Narottam Morarjee, Walchand Hirachand and other diginatories. He was married to Sumati Morarjee. They did not have any issue from the marriage.

After death of his father, Seth Narottam, in 1929, he became the Chairman of Scindia Steamship Company, which was a joint venture between Walchand Hirachand, Kilachand Devchand and their family but was managed by their family firm Narottam Morarjee & Company, who were the major partner in the steamship company.

He was also the Senior Partner of family firm - Narottam Morarjee & Co., who were Managing Agents of the Morarji Gokuldas textile mills and shipping firms. His wife Sumati was also co-partner in the family firm and actively engaged in managing family business and especially shipping firm - The Scindia Steam Navigation Co Ltd. He was also director in firms Eastern Shipping Corporation and Hindustan Shipyard Limited The Morarji Gokuldas mill was sold to Piramal Chatrubhuj in 1935, however, Scindia Steamship remained with Morarjee's till Shanti Kumar's death.

He came in contact with Mahatma Gandhi at a young age due to his father and started wearing khadi at a very young age. He and also his wife remained close associate and confidante of Mahatma Gandhi throughout his life. When Kasturba died in prison, Shanti Kumar was among the few close aides, who was allowed inside the prison. He was with other few personalities like Lady Premlila Thakersey, Kanu Gandhi, Kamal Narayan Bajaj with Mahatma Gandhi at time of his profound grief. In 1944, after demise of Kasturba and due to failing health when Gandhiji was released from Agha Khan's Palace at Pune, he stayed at the Juhu bungalow of Shanti Kumar Morarji for many months for convalescing. Sarojini Naidu and Vijaya Laxmi Pandit also stayed at his house during this time.

Further, he was closely involved and associated with other prominent leaders of Indian National Congress like Vallabhbhai Patel, J. L. Nehru, Vaikunth Mehta, G. L. Mehta, Jai Prakash Narayan, Maulana Azad, Rajendra Prasad and others. He was closely involved in political activities and important communications of pre-independence era. He and his wife were also actively involved in picketing, Quit India movement and activities for India's independence.

He was one of the chief sponsors of the Kasturba Gandhi National Memorial Trust along with Thakkar Bapa, Narandas Gandhi, Devdas Gandhi, G. D. Birla, V. L. Mehta and others.

During partition of India upon the call of Mahatma Gandhi, Shanti Kumar and Shoorji Vallabhdas sent their steamers to Karachi to bring the Dalits stranded there to back to India, free of cost.

When the Gandhi Birth Centenary Postage Stamps were issued by India Post in 1969, the department publicly acknowledged the help provided by Shanti Kumar in designing of postage stamps of Mahatma Gandhi.

He died in 1982 survived by his wife. By the time of Shanti Kumar's death Scindia, the affairs of which were largely looked after his wife Sumati was already in big debts and trouble and in 1987, the control of the company was taken over by the government of India.
