= Reetika Khera =

Indian development economist

- Education: Convent of Jesus and Mary, Baroda, Delhi School of Economics, University of Delhi, University of Sussex, Maharaja Sayajirao University of Baroda
- Occupation: Development economist

Reetika Khera is an Indian development economist. Khera is Professor (Economics) at the Indian Institute of Technology, Delhi (IIT Delhi). She was Associate Professor (Economics and Public Systems group) at the Indian Institute of Management, Ahmedabad (IIM Ahmedabad) from 2018-20.

== Early life and education ==
Reetika Khera received a B.A. in economics from Maharaja Sayajirao University of Baroda, an M.A. in economics from the Delhi School of Economics, University of Delhi and an M.Phil. in development studies from the Institute of Development Studies at the University of Sussex in Brighton, England. Khera completed a Ph.D. in economics at the Delhi School of Economics. She did her schooling from Convent of Jesus and Mary, Baroda.

She has received fellowships from the Institute for Economic Growth, the Commonwealth Scholarship Scheme, King's College London, and from Princeton University (for a project with Nobel laureate Sir Angus Deaton).

== Career ==
Reetika Khera is a development economist. She was at the Indian Institute of Management, Ahmedabad, on leave from her post as Sulaiman Mutawa Associate Chair Professor in the Department of Humanities and Social Sciences at the Indian Institute of Technology, Delhi. Khera is an advocate for improved welfare programs in the country and participated in the campaign to implement India's National Rural Employment Guarantee Act (NREGA).

Before joining IIT Delhi she was based at the G. B. Pant Social Science Institute, Allahabad University and at the Centre for Development Economics at the Delhi School of Economics. She has published several research papers analyzing NREGA, the Public Distribution System (PDS) and other programs that affect India's most vulnerable citizens. In October 2017, she was in residence as an External Faculty Fellow at the Stanford Humanities Center and was nominated for the post (by the Center for South Asia) to edit a book titled on India's Aadhaar program.

In 2021, she won the Malcolm Adiseshiah Award for distinguished contributions to Development Studies. The award was instituted by the Malcolm & Elizabeth Adiseshiah Trust in 2000 and is presented to social scientists for their outstanding contributions to the society. The Malcolm Adiseshiah Award was first given to Abhijit V. Banerjee in 2000. Since then, Ram Guha, Pratap Bhanu Mehta, Jayati Ghosh, Nandini Sundar, Amita Baviskar, Yogendra Yadav, among others, have received it.

Khera has written columns for popular media and been profiled in the mainstream media in India—for outlets such as NDTV, Scroll.in, Wire.in, Outlook India, Financial Times, Reuters, Bloomberg Quint, Quartz, Magnum Foundation, Indian Express, Business Standard, Business Line, Economic Times, Frontline (she wrote the Nov 2016 cover feature), Business Today (she wrote the Jan 2016 cover feature) and the BBC. She is frequently interviewed on Indian television in English and Hindi and in alternative Indian media (such as Newslaundry, Counterview.org (she wrote a feature piece on Aadhaar), Deccan Herald, Livemint, South Asia Citizens Web, Countercurrents, India Together and India Spend).

== Publications ==
=== Books ===
- Dissent on Aadhaar, Big Data Meets Big Brother
- Drèze, Jean and Khera, Reetika (2015), [null Readings in Social Policy and Public Action], unpublished compilation.
- De, Anuradha, Khera, Reetika, Kumar, AK Shiva, Samson Meera (2011), PROBE Revisited (New Delhi: Oxford University Press).
- Battle for Employment Guarantee (2011), (New Delhi: Oxford University Press). Edited.
- Citizen's Initiative for Right of Children Under Six (2006), Focus On Children Under Six, Abridged Report (New Delhi: Right to Food Campaign). Contributor.
- Dey, Nikhil, Drèze, Jean and Khera, Reetika (2006), Employment Guarantee: A Primer (New Delhi: National Book Trust).

=== Peer reviewed articles ===
- Impact of Aadhaar on Welfare Programmes, Economic and Political Weekly, 16 December, Vol 52, No. 50. Special Article.
- Aadhaar and Food Security in Jharkhand, Pain Without Gain?, With Jean Drèze, Nazar Khalid and Anmol Somanchi. Economic and Political Weekly, 16 December, Vol 52, No. 50. Special Article.
- Recent Social Security Initiatives in India, With Jean Drèze. World Development, Vol 98, October 2017, pp. 555–572.
- Children's Development: Baby Steps in Odisha, Economic and Political Weekly, Vol 50, No. 40. Special Article.
- Clarification on PDS Leakages, Economic and Political Weekly, Vol 50, No. 39. With Jean Dreze, Himanshu and Abhijit Sen. Discussion.
- Food Security: Bihar on the Move, Economic and Political Weekly, Vol. 50, No. 34. With Jean Dreze and Jessica Pudussery. Special Article.
- UID: From Inclusion to Exclusion, Seminar, August 2015.
- Public Health in North India, An Exploratory Study in Four States Economic and Political Weekly, Vol. 50, No. 21, pp. 53–58. With Kritika Goel. Insight.
- Understanding Leakages in the Public Distribution System, Economic and Political Weekly, Vol. 50, No., February 2015. With Jean Drèze. Insight.
- UID project: Does Evidence Matter, Yojana, July 2014.
- Cash vs. In-kind Transfers: Indian Data Meets Theory, Food Policy, 46, pp. 116–128, 2014.
- Rural Poverty and the Public Distribution System, Economic and Political Weekly, Vol 48, No 45&46, 16 November 2013. With Jean Drèze. Special Article.
- Mid-Day Meals Looking Ahead, Economic and Political Weekly, August 2013.
- On the NIPFP Response, Economic and Political Weekly, Discussion, Vol. 48, No. 10, 9 March 2013. Discussion.
- A Cost-Benefit Analysis of UID, Economic and Political Weekly, Vol. 48, No. 5, 2 February 2013. Commentary.
- Regional Patterns of Human and Child Deprivation, Economic and Political Weekly, Vol 47, No. 39, 29 September 2012. With Jean Drèze. Special Article.
- Food Security Act: One Step Forward, One Step Back?, Seminar, No. 634, 2012.
- Revival of the Public Distribution System: Evidence and Explanations, Economic and Political Weekly, Vol 46, No. 44-45, November, 2011. Special Article.
- Trends in Diversion of Grain from the Public Distribution System, Economic and Political Weekly, Vol 46, No. 26, 21 May 2011. Special Article.
- India's Public Distribution System: Utilization and Impact, Journal of Development Studies, Vol 47, No. 3, pp. 1–23, 2011.
- The UID Project and Social Welfare, Economic and Political Weekly, Vol 46, No. 9. 2011. Perspectives.
- The BPL Census and A Possible Alternative, Economic and Political Weekly, Volume 45 (No. 9), 27 February 2010. With Jean Drèze. Special Article.
- Women Workers and their Perceptions of National Rural Employment Guarantee Act, Economic and Political Weekly, Volume 44 (No. 43), 24 October 2009. With Nandini Nayak. Special Article.
- Right to Food: Beyond Cheap Promises, Economic and Political Weekly, Volume 44 (No. 29) 18 July 2009. Insight.
- Starvation Deaths and "Primitive Tribal Groups, Economic and Political Weekly, Volume 43 (No. 52), 27 December – 2 January 2008. Commentary.
- Self-Targeting on Employment Programmes, Indian Journal of Labour Economics, Volume 51, No. 2, 2008.
- Access to the Targeted Public Distribution System: A Case Study in Rajasthan, Economic and Political Weekly, Volume 43 (No. 44), 1–7 November 2008. Special Article.
- Empowerment Guarantee Act, Economic and Political Weekly, Volume 43 (No. 35), 30 August – 5 September 2008. Commentary.
- The State of India’s Children (with Jean Drèze and Sudha Narayanan), Indian Journal of Human Development, Volume 1, No. 2, July–December, 2007.
- Political Economy of State Response to Drought, Economic and Political Weekly, 16 December 2006. Special Article.
- Mid-Day Meals in Primary Schools: Achievements and Challenges, Economic and Political Weekly, 18 November 2006. Perspectives.
- Bringing Grassroots Democracy to Life: The MKSS Campaign in the Rajasthan Panchayat Elections, Economic and Political Weekly, 19 February 2005. Commentary.
- Monitoring Disclosures, Seminar, February 2004.
- Crime, Gender and Society in India: Insights from homicide data, Population and Development Review, Volume 30, No. 2, 2000. With Jean Drèze.

=== Popular media (print) ===
In January 2018, her NYT editorial, "Why India's Big Fix is a Big Flub," was one of the most comprehensive public arguments ever made on the limitations of Aadhaar. Khera describes how the program aimed to biometrically register India's 1.3 billion residents in an even-handed, judicious way. But although millions enrolled, the program remains riddled with colossal privacy and corruption challenges.

In her January New York Times editorial, Khera argues:

Aadhaar was supposed to showcase the government’s forward thinking about efficient administration; it has only exposed the state’s coerciveness. It was supposed to ease the poor’s access to welfare; it has hurt the neediest. It was supposed to harness technology in the service of development; it has made people’s personal data vulnerable. One of the Indian government’s biggest banner projects has become a glaring example of all that can go wrong with policy making in this country.

As part of an April 2018 story in the New York Times, Khera highlights how India's poorest classes are among those Aadhaar has harmed the most. Rather than being aided by the program, Khera states that, "This is the population that is being passed off as ghosts and bogus by the government."

2022

- The Freebies Debate: An 'Anti-Democratic' Turn, BQ Prime, 24 August.
- Should there be limits on ‘freebies’?, The Hindu, 19 August.
- Six types of problems Aadhaar is causing – and safeguards needed immediately, Scroll.in, 2 January 2022 |

2021

- Hunger Index Is Limited, but There’s Enough Proof That India Has a Problem The Wire, 28 October | भूख सूचकांक में खामियां हैं, पर कमी हमारी व्यवस्था में भी है, Dainik Bhaskar, 28 October.
- Indian workers deserve more than Food Security, The Leaflet.in, 8 July.
- “Either we all live in a decent world, or nobody does.”, The Third Eye, 30 June.
- Doorstep delivery of rations sounds like a good idea – but it actually raises many hard questions, Scroll.in, 12 June.
- Decoding inequality in a digital world, The Hindu, 11 May.
- India’s vaccine policy mess is due to its reliance on technocrats instead of public health experts, Scroll.in, 8 May 2021.
- কী আশায় বুক বাঁধা যায়? Ananda Bazaar Patrika, 28 April 2021.
- 'Much more space must be given to public health experts in designing the vaccine strategy", Mid-Day, 26 April.
- Going beyond Tamil Nadu’s ‘freebies’ narrative, The Hindu, 5 April.
- আত্মনির্ভরতা শুধু গরিবের জন্য? Ananda Bazaar Patrika, 5 Jan, 2021.

2020

- How Hunger came back to haunt India Mint, 23 December.
- MSP — the factoids versus the facts, The Hindu, 19 December 2020. With Prankur Gupta and Sudha Narayanan.
- Can the right to work be made real in India?, The Hindu, 13 November 2020.
- What Pay Ratios in NIFTY50 companies tell us about income inequality in India" Feminism in India, 11 November 2020.
- Pay Ratio Report: “RIL has blatantly dodged mandatory requirements. SEBI and government are sleeping,” says Dr Reetika KheraThe CSR Universe, 5 October.
- Where is the Covid money, honey?, Economic Times, 30 September.
- PM's One-Nation, One-Ration Scheme - What Not To Do NDTV.com, 6 July.
- Modi government's 'One Nation, One Ration' is an attempt to deflect attention from actual solutions, Scroll.in, 17 June.
- Why cash can save the rural jobs scheme, LiveMint, 26 May 2020.
- Getting cash transfers out of a JAM, The Hindu, 13 May 2020. With Jean Dreze.
- How will India emerge out of the lockdown?, The Hindu Parley, 24 April 2020. With G. Ananthakrishnan and Dr. Giridhar Babu.
- Cash Chorus Is Flawed. Use "Odisha Model" Instead, NDTV online, 11 April 2020.
- Succour for the most vulnerable, India Today, 11 April 2020.
- Covid-19: What can be done immediately to help vulnerable population, Ideas for India, 25 March 2020. | Hindi in The Wire and Gaon Connection.
- From apathy to action", The Hindu, 30 March 2020.
- Is there an opportunity here? BBC (in Hindi) | Tamil.

2019

- A Stepmotherly state, India Today, 29 November.
- Viable solutions to PDS portability are being ignored in the push for Aadhaar, Indian Express, 28 November.
- তথ্যদুনিয়ার সিঁদকাঠি, Ananda Bazaar Patrika, 8 August 2019
- The Makings of a Digital Kleptocracy, The Hindu, 31 July 2019
- Why Indian voters need NYAY, But deserve more than basic guarantees, News18.com, 28 March.
- The Aadhaar Ordinance, Overruling the Supreme Court, BloombergQuint, 1 March.
- Back to Basics, India Today, 1 February 2019.

2018

- Aadhaar verdict, Big data meets big brother, Mint, 1 October.
- The Poor are left to themselves, The Hindu, 29 September.
- A let-down, but dissenting view is reason for hope, Times of India, 27 September 2018.
- If the Supreme Court could change its mind on Section 377, it will on Aadhaar too, Hindustan Times, 27 September.
- Food for Thought, India Today, 11 August 2018.
- These Digital ID's have cost people their privacy - and their lives, Washington Post, 9 August 2018.
- Surveillance is the anti-thesis of freedom, Deccan Herald, 10 June.
- Tale of Two Whistleblowers, Indian Express, 28 April.
- Aadhaar in Welfare is Pain without Gain, Hindustan Times, 24 April.
- Aadhaar: A Double Whammy, India Today, 29 March.
- Smarter than Aadhaar, Business Standard, 13 March.
- Aadhaar's $11-billion question, Economic Times, 7 February. With Jean Drèze.
- Why India's Big Fix is a Big Flub, New York Times, 22 January.
- Aadhaar's Twin Existential Crisis, Business Standard, 18 January.
- Aadhaar has no role in plugging leakages’, Hindu Business Line, 10 January.
- Mind you, data security isn't the worst thing about Aadhaar ’, ThePrint.in, 8 January 2018.
- PDS ko khatam kar dega DBT', Prabhat Khabar, 8 January 2018.
- None of the problems in the implementation of NREGA can be fixed by Aadhaar. On the contrary, Aadhaar is the source of some problems", Invisible Lawyer, 18 December.

2018

- It is time for judiciary to call out the Indian government's lie on ‘voluntary Aadhaar’, Scroll.in, 7 December.
- Why ABBA must go The Hindu, 13 November.
- आधार पर अदालत की सुनें Amar Ujala, 13 November.
- Why govt-subsidized Amma, Indira canteens are life-saversHindustan Times, 25 August 2017.
- Maut aur taqleef se jhoojhti janata Prabhat Khabar, 20 August.
- आधार: जीवन के अधिकार पर प्रहार Prabhat Khabar, 2 August.
- The Government is speaking in two tongues on the right to privacy Interview, Business Standard, 23 July.
- The Different Ways in Which Aadhaar Infringes on Privacy, The Wire, 2 June.
- Digital India: Ek Nazar, Prabhat Khabar, 18 July.
- The Real Beneficiaries, Indian Express, 2 June.

2017

- Evidence No Bar, Indian Express, 5 April 2017.
- Feeding Insecurities, Hindu Business Line, 31 March 2017.
- No Good Will Come from Linking Aadhaar to Mid-Day Meals | आधार को मिड डे मील से जोड़ने पर नुकसान के सिवा कुछ हासिल नहीं होगा, The Wire, 24 March.
- Four videos that show why Rajasthan needs to desperately fix its public distribution system, Scroll.in, 9 March.
- What Explains The Popular Support for Demonetization. In Hindi. नोटबंदी को मिले जनसमर्थन के पीछे क्या कारण है? The Wire, 27 February 2017.
- Ten Things We Need to Change, Livemint, 4 February 2017.
- Nice to See NREGA Trending. But Urgent Fixes Required, NDTV, 3 February 2017.
- After many u-turns, has Modi finally recognised the importance of social security measures?Scroll.in, 8 January 2017.

2016 and earlier

- A Phased Approach Will Make a "Basic Income" Affordable for India, The Wire, 20 December 2016.
- Why We Need to Open ‘Amma Canteens’ All Over India, The Wire, 8 December 2016.
- Amma's canteens, baby care kits most significant additions to Tamil Nadu welfare schemes: Reetika Khera, Catch News, 7 December 2016.
- Aadhaar-enabled Exclusion and Corruption, Deccan Herald, 27 November 2016.
- निन्यानबे फीसदी बनाम एक फीसदी, Amar Ujala, 22 November 2016.
- The Good, Bad, and Ugly of Modi's 'surgical strike' on Black Money, NDTV, 14 November 2016.
- Policy Disaster, Frontline, 11 November 2016.
- कुपोषण से कैसे लड़ सकते हैं, Amar Ujala, 19 October 2016.
- Big Media's Take on the Aadhaar-LPG Savings Saga Highlights Why We Can't Trust It, The Wire, 7 October 2016.
- Could the virtual world of Pokémon Go be used to help rich Indians see real struggles of the poor?, Scroll.in, 30 July 2016.
- क्या 'आधार' लोगों का अधिकार छीन रहा है?, BBC Hindi, 27 July 2016.
- On Aadhaar Success, Its All Hype - That Includes the World Bank, NDTV.com, 23 July 2016.
- Food Security Act: How are poor states doing?, Ideas for India, 29 June 2016.
- Jean Dreze & Reetika Khera: Any state can reform PDS if it has political willInterview, Catch News, 17 June 2016.
- Five Aadhaar Myths that Don't Stand Up to Scrutiny, The Wire, 23 March 2016.
- मजदूरों के हक में मनरेगा, Amar Ujala, 4 February 2016.
- Digging holes, filling them up, Indian Express, 3 February 2016.
- "For NREGA, Tamil Nadu is the only hope", NDTV.com, 2 February 2016.
- Community kitchens: An idea whose time has come, Scroll.in, 22 January 2016.
- The Right(s) Perspective on Populism, Business Today, 17 January 2016.
- Child Development: Kerala tops, Gujarat flops, Bihar hops, NDTV 24x7 | बाल विकास - केरल टॉप, गुजरात फ्लॉप, बिहार हिट NDTV India, 18 November 2015. With Jean Drèze.
- "Child Development: How are Indian states faring?" Ideas for India.
- PDS in Bihar, The Road Ahead Live Mint, 3 November 2015.
- "A Nobel for the idea of well-being", The Hindu, 17 October 2015. "Against the tide: Deaton's economics" Ideas for India.
- गरीबी के बारे में डीटन ने बढ़ाई है अर्थशास्त्र की समझ, Outlook Hindi, 15 October 2015.
- Five Myths About Aadhaar, Outlook, 18 September 2015.
- Thought for Food, खाद्य सुरक्षा: सुधर सकते हैं फिसड्डी राज्यों के भी हालात Outlook, 21 August 2015. With Jean Dreze.
- आधार: ज़िंदगी में तांकझांक का तर्क कितना सही?, BBC Hindi, 17 August 2015.
- गरीबी से जंग के भोथरे हथियार, Amar Ujala, 31 July 2015.
- Nurture Mission, Frontline, 24 July 2015. With Rajkishor Mishra.
- Seven reasons why India needs eggs, Scroll.in, 10 June 2015.
- Eggs and Prejudice, Indian Express, 6 June 2015.
- And the Unique Identification juggernaut keeps rolling, The Wire, 3 June 2015.
- नकद हस्तांतरण से क्या हो पाएगी खाद्य सुरक्षा, Amar Ujala, 26 April 2015.
- Whose Bharat is it?, Outlook, March 2015.
- Ending the APL Scam, LiveMint, 3 March 2015. With Jean Dreze.
- The Meaning of Vikas, Outlook, February 2015.
- Fiscal Attention Deficit, HuffPost, February, 2015.
- Kaise Pahuche Garibon Tak Anaaj, Amar Ujala, February 2015.
- Social Welfare: India is trailing among the BRICS, The BRICS Post, 1 December 2014.
- The Whys and Whats of NREGA, Indiaspend.org, 4 November 2014 | मनरेगा से क्या है मोदी को दिक्कत?, BBC Hindi, 25 November.
- 'विकास मॉडलों' के बीच ओडिशा से सबक, BBC Hindi, 17 November 2014. With Jean Dreze and Rajkishor Mishra.
- माई-बाप सरकार' की वापसी, Amar Ujala, 15 October. | Mai-Baap Sarkar Returns, scroll.in
- Bitter Pill to Swallow, Indian Express, 2 September 2014.
- The Hills Aim Higher, Outlook, 24 August 2014. | हिमाचल को भी देखिए, Amar Ujala, 14 July 2014.
- Aadhaar-enabled DBT is more demanding than DBT, Business Standard, 28 June 2014.
- मेरे गुजरात की कहानी, Amar Ujala | Growing up in Gujarat, NDTV, 8 April 2014.
- UID project: Does Evidence matter?, Ideas for India, 5 February 2014.
- सामाजिक सुरक्षाः अपने ही क़ानून मरोड़ती सरकार, BBC Hindi, 19 November 2013.
- Do Government Schemes Ever work?, Yahoo News 22 October.
- A Welcome Intervention, Deccan Herald, 29 September 2013.
- Five Misconceptions about the Food Security Bill, Reprinted in LiveMint, 8 August 2013. Ideas for India version.
- The Devil is in the detail, The Hindu, 6 August. | व्यक्ति नहीं परिवार अहम, Amar Ujala, 3 August 2013.
- Don't crunch this lunch, Times of India, 21 July 2013. Hindi translation published in Dainik Jagran.
- Food Security is Affordable, Hindu Business Line, 14 April 2013.
- Lessons from the East Godavari Pilot, The Hindu, 11 April 2013.
- Cash for Vote, Frontline, Volume 30, No. 4, March 2013. | Malayalam translation, published in Mathrubhumi. | DBT par Sanshay, Hindi translation, published in Rashtriya Sahara, 24 February 2013
- Working Things Out, Hindustan Times, 20 February 2013.
- Is UID Linked Cash Transfer a Good Idea, Business Standard, 10 January 2013.
- Food Security Act: Should the Centre Emulate Chhattisgarh?, Hindu Business Line, 28 December 2012.
- Benefit Transfer or Vote Transfer, Deccan Herald, 16 December 2012.
- Long Road to Cash Transfers, Financial Express, 4 December 2012.
- खरा नहीं है नकद का सौदा, Amar Ujala, 28 November 2012.
- Tamil Nadu's Striking Progress in Welfare, India Together, 10 September 2012.
- A Bill that asks too much of the poor, The Hindu, 5 September 2012. With Jean Drèze.
- Putting Kerala to Work, The Hindu, 1 August.
- Experiments with Aadhaar, The Hindu, 27 June 2012, with Jean Drèze and Bharat Bhatti. | Response to the Minister's response, The Hindu, 4 July 2012, with Jean Drèze and Bharat Bhatti.
- Adhaar se Kiska Uddhar, Amar Ujala, 28 February 2012
- UID: Road to Exclusion?, The New Indian Express, 16 February 2012
- Ghere Se Bahar, Amar Ujala, 31 December 2011
- Lessons from Brazil, Frontline, 17–30 December 2011
- PDS Leakages: The Plot Thickens, The Hindu, 12 August 2011
- Signs of Revival, The Hindu, 12 June 2011.
- Going Against the Grain, Hindustan Times, 27 January 2011.
- Biscuits, Tehelka, Volume 7, Issue 52, December, 2010.
- Chhattisgarh Shows the Way, The Hindu, 14 November 2010. With Jean Drèze.
- Not all that Unique, Hindustan Times, 30 September 2010.
- Wages of Delay, Frontline, Volume 27.
- Slow but Steady Success, The Hindu, 25 April 2010. With Karuna Muthiah.
- Incentives that work, The Hindu, 10 May 2009. With Meera Samson and Anuradha De.
- Lok Adalat or Joke Adalat, The Hindu, 22 February 2009. With Jean Drèze.
- Pati Experience, Frontline, Volume 26, No. 1, 2009.
- Battle for Employment Guarantee, Frontline, Volume 26, No. 1, 2009. With Jean Drèze.
- Banned but still there, Frontline, Volume 26, No. 1, 2009. With Jean Drèze.
- Rajasthan Way Ahead, Frontline, Volume 26, No. 1, 2009. With Anish Vanaik.
- From accounts to accountability, The Hindu, 6 December 2008. With Jean Drèze
- The Black Hole of NREGA Records, Yojana, August, 2008.
- Glucose for the Lok Sabha?, Hindustan Times, April 2008. With Jean Drèze.
- Rajniti ko Badalti Rozgar Garanty, Hindustan, March 2008. With Jean Drèze.
- Corruption in NREGA: Myths and Reality, 22 January, The Hindu, 2008. With Jean Drèze and Siddhartha.
- Employment Guarantee and Migration, 18 July, The Hindu, 2006.
- India's Right to Food Campaign, Just Change, October 2005.
- Beasts in Uniform, Tehelka, 18 June 2005.
- Not everybody loves a good drought, The Hindu Magazine, 2 January. With Aruna Roy.
- Using your Illusions, Hindustan Times, 18 February 2004. With Jean Drèze.
- Mid-Day Meals in Rajasthan, The Hindu, 13 November 2002.
- Poverty of Policy, Scarcity of Will, The Times of India, 17 May 2001. With Jean Drèze.

=== Hindi Articles ===
Since 2020, Khera has been a fortnightly columnist for Dainik Bhaskar.

- बड़े व्यापारियों की कर्जमाफी, इंडस्ट्री को दी जाने वाली छूट क्या फ्रीबीज़ नहीं हैं?, Dainik Bhaskar, 24 August.
- यदि टीचर बच्चों को एक्स्ट्रा समय नहीं दे पाएं तो उनके स्कूल से ड्रॉप-आउट होने का डर, Dainik Bhaskar, 7 April.
- मेडिकल शिक्षा के बजट को बढ़ाने की जरूरत; पिछले दशक में यह बहुत निराशाजनक रहा है, Dainik Bhaskar, 24 March.
- जीवन की रेस में हम उम्मीद कर रहे हैं कि दुर्बल पैर वाले भी सलामत पैरवालों का मुकाबला करें, Dainik Bhaskar.
- देश में आर्थिक असमानता पर चिंता करने की जरूरत; 1% लोगों के हाथों में देश की एक तिहाई संपत्ति Dainik Bhaskar.
- आधार से जुड़ी पांच तरह की परेशानियां और उनके निराकरण के सुझाव, Dainik Bhaskar, January 2022.
- आधार को वोटर आईडी से जोड़ना सवालों में; ऐसे मामले में कभी भी ऐच्छिक जैसा कुछ नहीं होता!, Dainik Bhaskar, 24 December 2021.
- स्वस्थ भारत के लिए कई मुद्दों पर काम करना होगा ये एनएफएचएस-5 के आंकड़े चेतावनी हैं, Dainik Bhaskar, 10 December 2021.
- बच्चों की सुरक्षा सर्वोपरि, पर शिक्षा भी जरूरी; प्राथमिक स्कूलों का खुलना अब इसलिए आवश्यक, Dainik Bhaskar, 25 November 2021.
- एनीमिया से लड़ने के लिए सरकार अब राशन के चावल में आयरन मिलाएगी, Dainik Bhaskar, 11 November.
- लोकतंत्र गगनचुंबी विचार नहीं, जिंदगी का सार है; इतिहास में हुई चर्नोबिल परमाणु दुर्घटना में हमारे लिए कई सबक छिपे हैं, Dainik Bhaskar, 14 October.
- आधार की सीमाओं काे भुलाया जा रहा है, वोटर कार्ड को आधार से जोड़ने पर फायदा होगा या नुकसान>, Dainik Bhaskar, 30 September.
- कमजोर पृष्ठभूमि के बच्चों के लिए ऑनलाइन शिक्षा मिथक ही है, ऑनलाइन पढ़ाई में स्मार्टफोन की कमी, इंटरनेट पर खर्च जैसी कई बाधाएं हैं, Dainik Bhaskar, 16 September.
- विश्वविद्यालयों के रैंकिंग इंडेक्स उच्च शिक्षा के मकसद से धोखा हैं, विदेशी इंडेक्स में रैंकिंग को इतना महत्व क्यों, Dainik Bhaskar, 28 August.
- क्या भारत एक ‘डेटा ब्लैकहोल’ बनने के रास्ते पर बढ़ रहा है, The Wire Hindi, 14 August.
- प्राथमिक स्कूल आवश्यक सेवा हैं, इन्हें सबसे पहले खोलना जरूरी, छोटे बच्चों की शिक्षा न हो नजरअंदाज, Dainik Bhaskar, 6 August.
- निगरानी लोकतंत्र को दीमक की तरह खोखला कर देती है; हैकिंग निगरानी का यंत्र है, पारदर्शिता नहीं, Dainik Bhaskar, 22 July.
- प्रवासी मजदूरों पर उच्चतम न्यायालय का आदेश निराशाजनक है, आदेश से मजदूरों को नहीं मिलेगी असल राहत, Dainik Bhaskar, 8 July
- महिलाओं के स्वास्थ्य की चिंता, Prabhat Khabar, 16 July.
- दुनिया बिग डेटा के लिए पागल हम मूल आंकड़े ही नहीं जुटा पाते, सरकार महामारी के प्रकोप को कम आंक रही, Dainik Bhaskar, 24 June.
- दिल्ली में राशन की होम डिलीवरी योजना से भ्रष्टाचार बढ़ सकता है, आधार सत्यापन की वापसी राशन से वंचित करेगी, Dainik Bhaskar, 10 June.
- वैक्सीनेशन का फायदा तभी होगा, जब सभी वर्गों को टीका मिले, इसका इंतजाम करना सरकार की जिम्मेदारी", Dainik Bhaskar, 30 April 2021.
- फ्री वॉशिंग मशीन, फ्री चावल की सुर्खियों पर न जाएं, जानें कि तमिलनाडु में सियासी दलों के मेनिफेस्टो में वाकई में क्या है Dainik Bhaskar, 1 April 2021.
- खाद्य सुरक्षा के दायरे को कम करने की कोशिश, जबकि लॉकडाउन के दौरान बड़ी आबादी को इसी ने राहत दी, Dainik Bhaskar, 18 March 2021.
- देश के गांवों में 6% और शहरों में महज 25% लोगों के पास कंप्यूटर, ऐसे में ऑनलाइन लर्निंग कैसे कामयाब होगी?, Dainik Bhaskar, 5 March 2021.
- गरीबों के लिए कैंटीन की योजनाएं, नौटंकी या नेकनीयत? कई राज्यों में डिमांड के बावजूद फेल हुई योजना Dainik Bhaskar, 14 Feb, 2021.
- ऊंची-ऊंची बातें करने से किसी का स्वास्थ्य नहीं सुधरता, आगे चलकर लोगों को इसका खामियाजा भरना पड़ेगा Dainik Bhaskar, 4 Feb, 2021.
- क्या भारत एड्स के समय जैसी नैतिक भूमिका निभा सकता है? Dainik Bhaskar, Jan, 2021.
- स्वास्थ्य और पोषण: कोरोना के बाद मॉल और सिनेमाघर खुले, लेकिन आंगनबाड़ियां अब तक बंद हैं, Dainik Bhaskar, 24 December 2020.
- नए कानूनों से सुधार की बजाय, मंडी व्यवस्था के खत्म होने का डर है, Dainik Bhaskar, 10 December.
- क्या सरकार को मिड-डे मील योजना के लिए अक्षय-पात्र जैसी संस्थाओं की ज़रूरत है? The Wire Hindi, 30 November.
- सामाजिक और आर्थिक बदलाव, वास्तव में सुधार के लिए राजनीति आम जनता के हाथों में सबसे कारगर उपाय है, Dainik Bhaskar, 12 November.
- क्या हमारा लोकतंत्र पैसेवालों का लोकतंत्र होने की कगार पर है?, Dainik Bhaskar, 29 October.
- जो भारत हमें रोजमर्रा की जिंदगी में दिखता है या दिखाया जाता है, उसमें लगभग 80% लोग गायब हैं, Dainik Bhaskar, 14 October.
- हम कैसे मान लें कि निजी व्यापारी आढ़तियों की तरह व्यवहार नहीं करेंगे; एमएसपी पर अधिनियमों में सरकार की चुप्पी चिंता करने वाली है, Dainik Bhaskar, 25 September.
- देश की बड़ी आबादी को तालाबंदी ने बर्बादी की कगार पर पहुंचा दिया है, यदि हम वास्तव में देशप्रेमी हैं, तो इससे उबरने के लिए सक्षम वर्ग को कमर कसनी होगी, Dainik Bhaskar, 7 Sept.
- नीति बनाने वाले भूल गए हैं, स्वास्थ्य सेवाओं से भी जीडीपी बढ़ सकती है; अब 70 साल से चली आ रहीं गलतियों को सुधारने का मौका है, Dainik Bhaskar, 19 August.
- लोकतंत्र और सभ्य समाज में न्यायिक प्रक्रिया के वास्तव में चार उद्देश्य होने चाहिए- रोक, दंड, सुधार और पुनर्वास, Dainik Bhaskar, 15 July.
- देशभर की जेलों में कैदी के संक्रमित हो रहे, कोरोनाकाल में जेल में कैदियों की भीड़ खतरनाक साबित हो रही, Dainik Bhaskar, 25 June.
- वन नेशन वन राशन की घोषणा लोगों का दिल बहलाने के लिए और असली मुद्दे से ध्यान भटकाने के लिए बढ़िया उपाय है, Dainik Bhaskar, 11 June.
- स्वास्थ्य पर सरकारी खर्च ही नहीं व्यवस्था भी सुधरे, Dainik Bhaskar, 14 January.
- सूचना और निजता, दो अधिकारों की गाथा, Dainik Bhaskar, 30 November 2019.
- जिस तकनीक पर नोबेल मिला, उस पर कुछ सवाल, Dainik Bhaskar, 20 October 2019.
- मिड डे मील योजना भारत के लिए क्यों ज़रूरी है, BBC Hindi, 7 September 2019.
- पौष्टिकता बने पहली प्राथमिकता, भारत में हर तीसरा बच्चा कुपोषण का शिकार, Dainik Jagran, 1 September 2019.
- अनुच्छेद 370 का हटना : कश्मीर से मतलब कश्मीरियों से नहीं, Amar Ujala, 11 August 2019
- समाज रचना की अहम सीख है मिड-डे-मील, Dainik Bhaskar, 10 August 2019.
- सामाजिक सुरक्षा के नाम पर : हम किस परिवार में पैदा होते हैं, वह एक लॉटरी के समान है, Amar Ujala, 23 July 2019
- क्या सच में आधार सशक्तिकरण का हथियार है?, Dainik Bhaskar, 20 July 2019.
- कैसे करें न्याय?, Amar Ujala, 5 April 2019.
- आधार पर अभी भी सवाल, Outlook Hindi, 22 October 2018.
- गरीबों का राशन, Amar Ujala, 15 June.
- तमिलनाडु से क्यों नहीं सीखते, Amar Ujala, 18 March.
- िनजता दायरे में आधार, Amar Ujala, 16 May.
- हानिकर है आधार की अनिवार्यता, Prabhat Khabar, 11 May 2017.
- आधार को पैन कार्ड से जोड़ना कितना ख़तरनाक है?, BBC Hindi, 26 April 2017. Tamil.
- आधार - निजता और लोकतंत्र पर प्रहार, Navbharat, 9 April 2017.
- मिड-डे मिल में आधार अवैध Prabhat Khabar, 29 March 2017.
- मनरेगा में कैसे फूंकी जाए जान?, Rashtriya Sahara, 4 February 2017.
- यूबीआई कितना व्यावहारिक, Amar Ujala, 31 January 2017.
- एक अच्छी पहल की खामियां, Amar Ujala, 6 January 2017.

== Notes ==
In November 2017, Khera filed a "Right to Information" (RTI) request with the Unique Identification Authority of India (UIDAI) to solicit public data on how much the agency spent to advertise and promote Aadhaar, since the program started in 2009. UIDAI has not commented or responded to the RTI request.
