= V. K. Joseph =

Indian film critic

V. K. Joseph is an Indian film critic. In 2009 he was honoured with an award for best critic at the Indian National Film Awards "for his intellectual and aesthetic integrity in writing about regional, national and world cinema." Joseph is also the vice-chairman of the Kerala State Chalachitra Academy, an organization which promotes Malayalam cinema.

He is famous for his review of Charlie Chaplin's Modern Times.
