= Mumbai International Film Festival =

Film festival

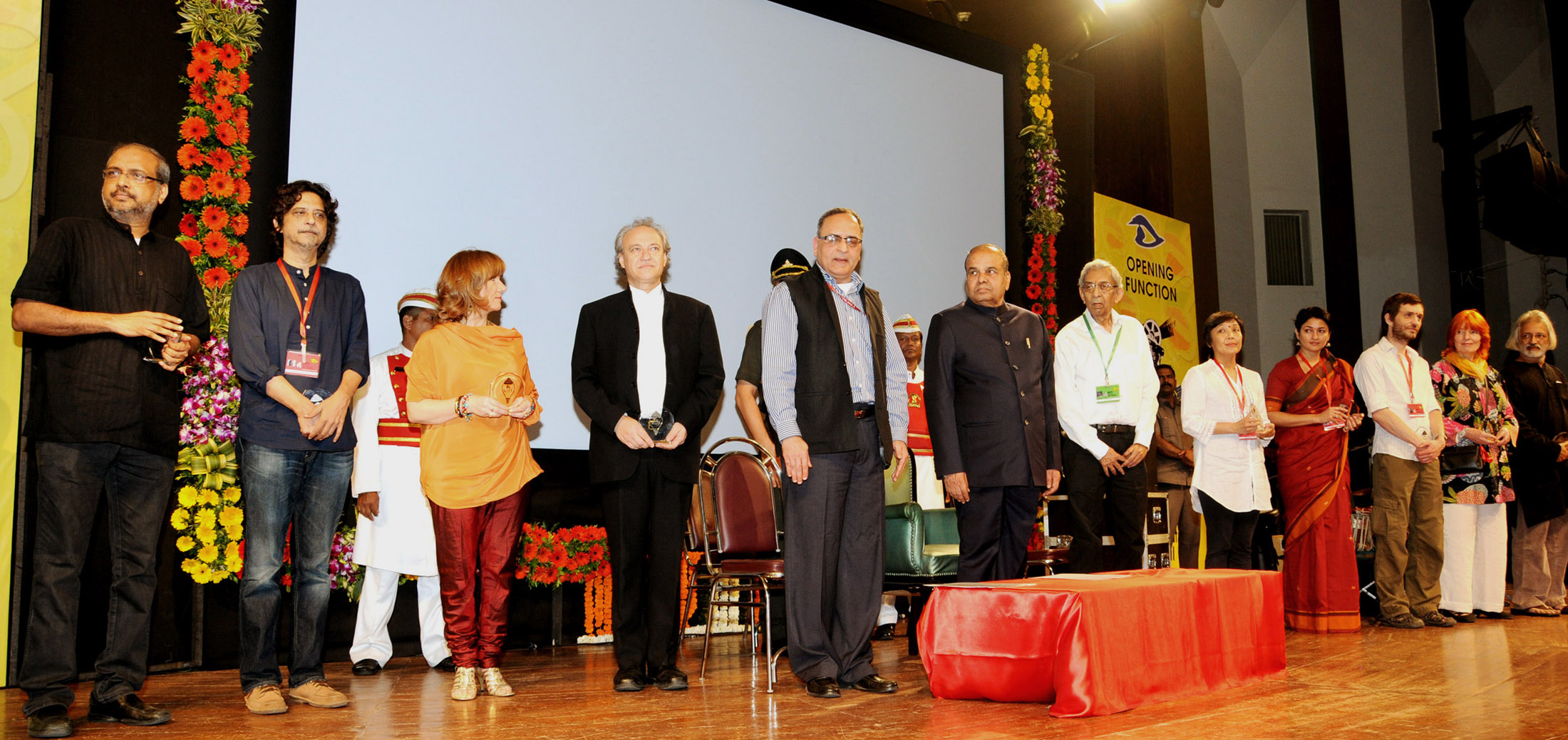
- The inaugural function of the 13th Mumbai International Film Festival (MIFF-2014)
- Location: Mumbai, Maharashtra, India
- Founded: 1990
- Most recent: 2024
- Hosted by: Films Division of India, Ministry of Information and Broadcasting, Government of India
- Language: International
- Website: miff.in

Mumbai International Film Festival
- 17th 16th

The Mumbai International Film Festival for Documentary, Short and Animation Films (MIFF) is a festival organized in the city of Mumbai (formerly Bombay) by the Films Division, Ministry of Information and Broadcasting, Government of India. It was started in 1990 and focuses on documentary, short fiction and animation films.

== History ==
The festival aims to provide a platform for documentary and short filmmakers from all over the world to meet, exchange ideas, and explore possibilities of co-production and marketing of documentary, short, and animation films.

This biennial festival is traditionally held at the National Centre for the Performing Arts (NCPA), Mumbai. However, most screenings of the 15th edition of the festival took place in the Films Division Complex on Pedder Road, which now sports multiple, state-of-the-art screening facilities.

Entries are open up to November for the Golden Conch and Silver Conch awards in International and National Competition Sections. The top documentary film of the festival in International Competition is honored with the Golden Conch Award and a Cash Prize of ₹1 million (₹10 lakhs). All the awards in the competition category are decided by an International and National Jury respectively, comprising top documentary and short filmmakers from India and abroad.

Besides the competition films, MIFF also screens a number of special packages like Jury Retrospective, Best of the Festivals, MIFF Prism, Country Focus documentaries, and restored classics. Panel discussions, an open forum, seminars and workshops on documentary filmmaking are organized as side activities during the festival.

The festival is open to the public, although prior registration as a delegate is required. The delegate fee is waived for students of film schools and mass media courses, in a bid to attract youngsters to meet up with masters.

The Ministry of Information & Broadcasting approved the doubling of prize money for the Golden Conch Award-winning Best Documentary Film in the International Competition to ₹1 million. The award money for the Lifetime Achievement award was also doubled to ₹1 million. Altogether, cash awards of ₹5.8 million will be given away during MIFF 2018.

=== 2016 ===
The 14th edition took place between 28 January and 3 February 2016. The 14th edition received a total of 825 entries including 135 entries in the International Competition. The International Jury was made up of Don Askarian (Germany), Jesper Andersen (Denmark), Mathicu Roy (Canada), Siddharth Kak (India) and Gitanjali Rao (Mumbai). The National Jury comprised Mike Pandey (India), Uma DaCunha (India), Biju Dhanapalan (India), Audrius Stonys (Lithuania) and Jane Yu (Taiwan). Manipuri Phum Shang by Haobam Paban Kumar won the top honors at the festival, along with the Swiss Indian films My Name Is Salt and Placebo.

Wildlife filmmaker from India Naresh Bedi was presented with the V Shantaram Lifetime Achievement Award for promoting the documentary movement in India. Legendary filmmaker late V Shantaram was formerly the Chief Producer and Head of Films Division.

=== 2018 ===
The 15th edition of MIFF was held from 28 January – 3 February 2018.

The Florida Project director Sean Baker was head of the jury, joining Oscar-winning editor Thom Noble, AFI Fest director Jacqueline Lyanga and Indian filmmaker Vishal Bhardwaj.

Phuttiphong Aroonpheng's Manta Ray won best film in the international competition. Rima Das' Bulbul Can Sing won in the India Gold category. Darren Aronofsky, who held a master class during the festival, was honored with an 'excellence in cinema' award.

=== 2020 ===
The 16th Mumbai International Film Festival was held from 28 January to 3 February 2020.

=== 2022 ===
The 17th Mumbai International Film Festival was held from 29 May to 5 June 2022. Documentary, Short Fiction and Animation films completed between 1 September 2019 and 31 December 2021 were eligible for the festival.

=== 2024 ===
The 18th Mumbai International Film Festival was held from 15 to 21 June 2024, screening 314 films from 59 languages.

=== 2026 ===
The 19th Mumbai International Film Festival was held from 15 June to 21 June 2026, in Mumbai.
